= National Register of Historic Places listings in Center City, Philadelphia =

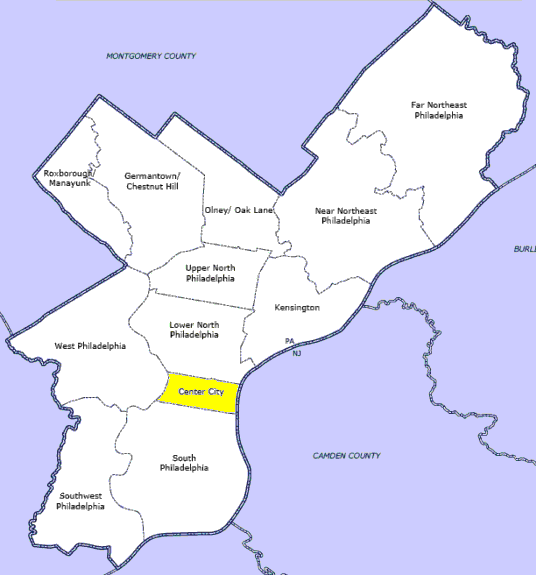
Location of Center City in Philadelphia

This is a list of the National Register of Historic Places listings in Center City, Philadelphia.

This is intended to be a complete list of the properties and districts on the National Register of Historic Places in Center City in Philadelphia, Pennsylvania, United States. The locations of National Register properties and districts for which the latitude and longitude coordinates are included below, may be seen in an online map.

There are more than 600 properties and districts listed on the National Register in Philadelphia, including 67 National Historic Landmarks. Center City includes 150 of these properties and districts, including 34 National Historic Landmarks; the city's remaining properties and districts are listed elsewhere. Ten historic districts cover almost half of Center City including essentially all the area between the Schuylkill and Delaware Rivers from Chestnut Street on the north to Locust Street on the south. Six other properties in Center City were once listed but have been removed.

== Current listings ==
	Name on the Register	Image	Date listed	Location	Neighborhood	Description
1	1616 Walnut Street Building	1616 Walnut Street Building	October 17, 1983 (#83004247)	1616 Walnut Street; 39°56′59″N 75°10′07″W	Rittenhouse Square East	
2	1900 Rittenhouse Square Apartments	1900 Rittenhouse Square Apartments	July 26, 1982 (#82003805)	1900 South Rittenhouse Square; 39°56′55″N 75°10′22″W	Rittenhouse Square East	
3	Academy of Music	Academy of Music	October 15, 1966 (#66000674)	Broad and Locust streets 39°56′53″N 75°09′54″W	Rittenhouse Square East	Napoleon LeBrun, architect
4	Adelphi School	Adelphi School	September 18, 1978 (#78002441)	1223–1225 Spring Street; 39°57′23″N 75°09′36″W	Chinatown	
5	Amalgamated Center	Amalgamated Center	December 30, 2008 (#08001269)	2101–2143 South Street; 39°56′43″N 75°10′38″W	Rittenhouse Square West	
6	American Baptist Publication Society	American Baptist Publication Society	June 27, 1980 (#80003607)	1420–1422 Chestnut Street; 39°57′03″N 75°09′55″W	Rittenhouse Square East	Frank Miles Day, architect (1896–97); also known as the Crozer Building
7	American Philosophical Society Hall	American Philosophical Society Hall	October 15, 1966 (#66000675)	104 South 5th Street in Independence Square; 39°56′56″N 75°08′59″W	Independence Mall	
8	Arch Street Meetinghouse	Arch Street Meetinghouse	May 27, 1971 (#71000716)	302–338 Arch Street; 39°57′07″N 75°08′50″W	Independence Mall	Designated a National Historic Landmark June 23, 2011
9	Arch Street Opera House	Arch Street Opera House	June 13, 1978 (#78002442)	1003–1005 Arch Street; 39°57′13″N 75°09′25″W	Chinatown	Edwin Forrest Durang, architect
10	Arch Street Presbyterian Church	Arch Street Presbyterian Church	May 27, 1971 (#71000717)	1726–1732 Arch Street; 39°57′16″N 75°10′11″W	Logan Square	Stephen Decatur Button, architect
11	Athenaeum of Philadelphia	Athenaeum of Philadelphia	February 1, 1972 (#72001144)	219 South 6th Street; 39°56′48″N 75°09′06″W	Society Hill	John Notman, architect
12	Oliver H. Bair Funeral Home	Oliver H. Bair Funeral Home	November 14, 1982 (#82001542)	1818–1820 Chestnut Street; 39°57′06″N 75°10′16″W	Rittenhouse Square East	
13	Belgravia Hotel	Belgravia Hotel	November 14, 1982 (#82001543)	1811 Chestnut Street; 39°57′07″N 75°10′15″W	Rittenhouse Square East	Samuel Webber, architect
14	Bell Telephone Company Building	Bell Telephone Company Building	August 7, 2000 (#00000849)	1827–1835 Arch Street; 39°57′20″N 75°10′15″W	Logan Square	
15	John C. Bell House	John C. Bell House	April 13, 1982 (#82003807)	229 South 22nd Street; 39°57′00″N 75°10′39″W	Rittenhouse Square West	Horace Trumbauer, architect
16	Bellevue Stratford Hotel	Bellevue Stratford Hotel	March 24, 1977 (#77001182)	200 South Broad Street; 39°56′57″N 75°09′54″W	Rittenhouse Square East	G. W. & W. D. Hewitt, architects (1902–04).
17	Benjamin Franklin Hotel	Benjamin Franklin Hotel	April 2, 1982 (#82003808)	822–840 Chestnut Street; 39°56′58″N 75°09′19″W	Market East	Horace Trumbauer, architect (1925).
18	The BIOSIS Headquarters Building		February 17, 2026 (#100012720)	2100 Arch Street; 39°57′21″N 75°10′30″W		
19	Bishop Mackay-Smith House	Bishop Mackay-Smith House	January 25, 1980 (#80003608)	251 South 22nd Street; 39°56′57″N 75°10′40″W	Rittenhouse Square West	Theophilus P. Chandler Jr., architect (1903–04).
20	Board of Education Building	Board of Education Building	August 25, 1983 (#83002266)	21st Street and Benjamin Franklin Parkway; 39°57′32″N 75°10′28″W	Logan Square	Irwin Thornton Catharine, architect (1930).
21	Boekel Building	Boekel Building	February 20, 2003 (#03000078)	505–515 Vine Street; 39°57′23″N 75°08′54″W	Old City	
22	Broad Street Historic District	Broad Street Historic District	April 6, 1984 (#84003529)	Roughly bounded by Juniper, Cherry, 15th, and Pine Sts. 39°57′03″N 75°09′51″W	Market East	
23	Carpenters' Hall	Carpenters' Hall	April 15, 1970 (#70000552)	310 Chestnut Street; 39°56′53″N 75°08′50″W	Independence Mall	
24	Cathedral of Saints Peter and Paul	Cathedral of Saints Peter and Paul	June 24, 1971 (#71000720)	18th Street and Benjamin Franklin Parkway; 39°57′26″N 75°10′07″W	Logan Square	Napoleon LeBrun, architect
25	Center City West Commercial Historic District	Center City West Commercial Historic District	January 7, 1988 (#87002203)	Roughly bounded by Chestnut, 15th, Walnut, Sansom, and 21st Streets; also roughly bounded by the Center City West Historic District, S. 15th, Locust St., and S. Sydenham St. 39°56′45″N 75°10′20″W	Rittenhouse Square East	
26	Chateau Crillon Apartment House	Chateau Crillon Apartment House	April 25, 1978 (#78002443)	222 South 19th Street; 39°56′57″N 75°10′24″W	Rittenhouse Square East	Horace Trumbauer, architect (1928).
27	Christ Church	Christ Church	April 15, 1970 (#70000553)	22–26 North 2nd Street; 39°57′03″N 75°08′37″W	Old City	
28	Christ Church Burial Ground	Christ Church Burial Ground	June 24, 1971 (#71000062)	5th and Arch Streets; 39°57′07″N 75°08′53″W	Independence Mall	
29	Church of the Holy Trinity	Church of the Holy Trinity	February 6, 1973 (#73001660)	19th and Walnut Streets, facing Rittenhouse Square; 39°57′01″N 75°10′23″W	Rittenhouse Square East	John Notman, architect
30	Clinton Street Historic District	Clinton Street Historic District	April 26, 1972 (#72001148)	Bounded by 9th, 11th, Pine, and Cypress Streets; 39°56′42″N 75°09′31″W	Washington Square West	
31	College of Physicians of Philadelphia	College of Physicians of Philadelphia	October 6, 2008 (#08001088)	19 South 22nd Street; 39°57′12″N 75°10′36″W	Rittenhouse Square West	Cope & Stewardson, architects
32	Continental Building	Continental Building	January 3, 2025 (#100011231)	400 Market Street; 39°57′01″N 75°08′52″W		
33	Edward Drinker Cope House	Edward Drinker Cope House	May 15, 1975 (#75001660)	2102 Pine Street; 39°56′49″N 75°10′36″W	Rittenhouse Square West	Frank Furness, architect
34	Drake Hotel	Drake Hotel	September 18, 1978 (#78002446)	1512–1514 Spruce Street; 39°56′49″N 75°10′03″W	Rittenhouse Square East	Murphy, Quigley & Co., architects
35	Drexel and Company Building	Drexel and Company Building	February 8, 1980 (#80003610)	135–143 South 15th Street; 39°56′56″N 75°09′56″W	Rittenhouse Square East	Horace Trumbauer, architect
36	Drinker's Court	Drinker's Court	May 27, 1971 (#71000723)	236–238 Delancey Street; 39°56′36″N 75°08′49″W	Society Hill	
37	Thomas Durham School	Thomas Durham School	November 18, 1988 (#88002265)	1600 Lombard Street; 39°56′42″N 75°10′08″W	Rittenhouse Square East	
38	East Center City Commercial Historic District	East Center City Commercial Historic District	July 5, 1984 (#84003531)	Roughly bounded by 6th, Juniper, Market and Locust streets 39°57′05″N 75°09′33″W	Market East	Boundary changes approved May 24, 2018.
39	Elfreth's Alley Historic District	Elfreth's Alley Historic District	October 15, 1966 (#66000681)	Between 2nd and Front Streets; 39°57′10″N 75°08′33″W	Old City	
40	Equitable Trust Building	Equitable Trust Building	July 3, 1986 (#86001405)	1405 Locust Street; 39°56′54″N 75°09′54″W	Rittenhouse Square East	
41	Estey Hall	Estey Hall	October 28, 1983 (#83004244)	1701 Walnut Street; 39°57′00″N 75°10′09″W	Rittenhouse Square East	Baker & Dallet, architects
42	Wilson Eyre House	Wilson Eyre House	April 13, 1977 (#77001183)	1003 Spruce Street; 39°56′47″N 75°09′29″W	Washington Square West	Wilson Eyre, architect
43	Fidelity–Philadelphia Trust Company Building	Fidelity–Philadelphia Trust Company Building	November 27, 1978 (#78002447)	123–151 South Broad Street; 39°56′59″N 75°09′49″W	Market East	Zantzinger & Borie, architects
44	First Bank of the United States	First Bank of the United States	May 4, 1987 (#87001292)	116 South 3rd Street; 39°56′53″N 75°08′47″W	Independence Mall	
45	First Troop Philadelphia City Cavalry Armory	First Troop Philadelphia City Cavalry Armory	July 24, 2017 (#90000420)	22 S. 23rd St. 39°57′12″N 75°10′43″W	Rittenhouse Square West	
46	First Unitarian Church	First Unitarian Church	May 27, 1971 (#71000724)	2121 Chestnut Street; 39°57′09″N 75°10′35″W	Rittenhouse Square West	Frank Furness, architect (1883–86).
47	Franklin Institute	Franklin Institute	August 1, 1979 (#79002319)	15 South 7th Street; 39°57′01″N 75°09′07″W	Independence Mall	John Haviland, architect. Now the Atwater Kent Museum.
48	Franklin Institute Science Museum	Franklin Institute Science Museum	January 3, 1985 (#85000039)	20th St. and the Benjamin Franklin Parkway; 39°57′29″N 75°10′23″W	Logan Square	John T. Windrim, architect (1929–31).
49	Franklin Square	Franklin Square	September 14, 1981 (#81000556)	Race and 6th Streets; 39°57′20″N 75°09′03″W	Chinatown	
50	Free Quaker Meetinghouse	Free Quaker Meetinghouse	September 22, 1971 (#71000063)	Southwestern corner of 5th and Arch Streets; 39°57′09″N 75°08′55″W	Independence Mall	
51	Henry George Birthplace	Henry George Birthplace	April 1, 1983 (#83002268)	413 South 10th Street; 39°56′39″N 75°09′30″W	Washington Square West	
52	Girard Group	Girard Group	May 6, 1983 (#83002269)	Delaware Avenue and Arch Street; 39°57′05″N 75°08′22″W	Penn's Landing	
53	Globe Ticket Company Building	Globe Ticket Company Building	November 1, 1984 (#84000268)	112 North 12th Street; 39°57′11″N 75°09′28″W	Chinatown	Destroyed to build the Pennsylvania Convention Center
54	Hahnemann Medical College & Hospital Complex Historic District	Hahnemann Medical College & Hospital Complex Historic District	April 21, 2025 (#100011684)	225-231 N. 15th Street, 216-248 N. Broad Street; 39°57′28″N 75°09′51″W		
55	Harris Building	Harris Building	August 31, 2001 (#01000928)	2121–2141 Market Street; 39°57′15″N 75°10′34″W	Logan Square	
56	Head House Square	Head House Square	June 19, 1972 (#72001158)	Both sides of the 400 block of South 2nd Street; 39°56′34″N 75°08′43″W	Society Hill	
57	Heywood Chair Factory	Heywood Chair Factory	August 23, 1984 (#84003541)	1010–1014 Race Street; 39°57′19″N 75°09′23″W	Chinatown	Willis G. Hale, architect (1892).
58	Hill-Physick House	Hill-Physick House	May 27, 1971 (#71000726)	321 South 4th Street; 39°56′39″N 75°08′54″W	Society Hill	
59	Hockley Row	Hockley Row	April 21, 1983 (#83002272)	237–241 South 21st Street, 2049 Locust Street; 39°56′59″N 75°10′35″W	Rittenhouse Square West	Frank Furness, architect (1875).
60	A.J. Holman and Company	A.J. Holman and Company	May 17, 1984 (#84003544)	1222–1226 Arch Street; 39°57′14″N 75°09′38″W	Chinatown	
61	Houses at 2000–2018 Delancey Street	Houses at 2000–2018 Delancey Street	April 22, 1982 (#82003809)	2000–2018 Delancey Street; 39°56′51″N 75°10′33″W	Rittenhouse Square West	
62	Independence National Historical Park	Independence National Historical Park	October 15, 1966 (#66000683)	Bounded by Walnut, 6th, Chestnut, and 2nd Streets; 39°56′52″N 75°08′53″W	Independence Mall	
63	Insurance Company of North America Building	Insurance Company of North America Building	June 2, 1978 (#78002449)	1600 Arch Street; 39°57′16″N 75°10′02″W	Logan Square	
64	Horace Jayne House	Horace Jayne House	July 22, 1982 (#82003810)	320 South 19th Street; 39°56′50″N 75°10′23″W	Rittenhouse Square East	Frank Furness, architect (1895)
65	Juvenile and Domestic Branches of the Municipal Court	Juvenile and Domestic Branches of the Municipal Court	March 31, 2014 (#14000097)	1801 Vine St. 39°57′34″N 75°10′10″W	Logan Square	
66	Thaddeus Kosciuszko National Memorial	Thaddeus Kosciuszko National Memorial	December 18, 1970 (#70000068)	301 Pine Street; 39°56′36″N 75°08′51″W	Society Hill	
67	Land Title Building	Land Title Building	December 15, 1978 (#78002450)	1400 Chestnut Street; 39°57′01″N 75°09′52″W	Market East	Daniel Burnham (1897–1898), Horace Trumbauer (1902), architects.
68	Larkin-Belber Building	Larkin-Belber Building	February 27, 2003 (#03000077)	2200–2218 Arch Street; 39°57′21″N 75°10′36″W	Logan Square	
69	Dr. Joseph Leidy House	Dr. Joseph Leidy House	December 4, 1980 (#80003613)	1319 Locust Street; 39°56′52″N 75°09′50″W	Washington Square West	Wilson Eyre, architect
70	J. Peter Lesley House	J. Peter Lesley House	October 12, 1994 (#94001646)	1008 Clinton Street; 39°56′43″N 75°09′31″W	Washington Square West	
71	Lits Department Store	Lits Department Store	May 15, 1979 (#79002322)	Market Street between 7th and 8th Streets; 39°57′05″N 75°09′10″W	Independence Mall	
72	Logan Square	Logan Square	September 14, 1981 (#81000555)	18th and Race Streets; 39°57′28″N 75°10′15″W	Logan Square	Eyre & McIlvaine, architects. Alexander Stirling Calder, sculptor
73	Mask and Wig Club of the University of Pennsylvania	Mask and Wig Club of the University of Pennsylvania	November 20, 1979 (#79002323)	310 South Quince Street; 39°56′46″N 75°09′37″W	Washington Square West	Wilson Eyre, architect
74	Masonic Temple	Masonic Temple	May 27, 1971 (#71000727)	1 North Broad Street; 39°57′13″N 75°09′46″W	Market East	James H. Windrim, architect (1868–73).
75	Francis McIlvain House	Francis McIlvain House	November 20, 1979 (#79002324)	1924 Arch Street; 39°57′19″N 75°10′20″W	Logan Square	
76	Merchants' Exchange Building	Merchants' Exchange Building	August 7, 2001 (#01001047)	143 South 3rd Street; 39°56′50″N 75°08′46″W	Independence Mall	William Strickland, architect
77	Mikveh Israel Cemetery	Mikveh Israel Cemetery	June 24, 1971 (#71000061)	Northwestern corner of Spruce and Darien Streets; 39°56′46″N 75°09′21″W	Washington Square West	
78	Clarence B. Moore House	Clarence B. Moore House	May 8, 1973 (#73001664)	1321 Locust Street; 39°56′54″N 75°09′53″W	Rittenhouse Square East	Wilson Eyre, architect
79	Mother Bethel A.M.E. Church	Mother Bethel A.M.E. Church	March 16, 1972 (#72001166)	419 South 6th Street; 39°56′35″N 75°09′09″W	Society Hill	
80	Musical Fund Hall	Musical Fund Hall	March 11, 1971 (#71000730)	808 Locust Street; 39°56′49″N 75°09′18″W	Washington Square West	William Strickland, architect of alterations into concert hall.
81	Neill-Mauran House	Neill-Mauran House	June 30, 1980 (#80003614)	315–317 South 22nd Street; 39°56′53″N 75°10′40″W	Rittenhouse Square West	Wilson Eyre, architect
82	New Century Guild	New Century Guild	November 4, 1993 (#93001611)	1307 Locust Street; 39°56′49″N 75°09′46″W	Washington Square West	
83	New Market	New Market	November 13, 1966 (#66000686)	South 2nd Street, between Pine and Lombard Streets; 39°56′35″N 75°08′43″W	Society Hill	Includes oldest firehouse in US (1804)
84	New York Mutual Life Insurance Company Building	New York Mutual Life Insurance Company Building	June 6, 1980 (#80003615)	1001–1005 Chestnut Street; 39°57′01″N 75°09′26″W	Market East	Henry Fernbach, architect (1873–75).
85	Old City Historic District	Old City Historic District	May 5, 1972 (#72000093)	Old city area including parts of Washington Square East Development Area and Franklin Square East Development Area; 39°56′58″N 75°08′44″W	Old City	
86	Old Federal Reserve Bank	Old Federal Reserve Bank	June 28, 1979 (#79002325)	925 Chestnut Street; 39°57′01″N 75°09′24″W	Market East	Paul Cret, architect
87	Packard Motor Corporation Building	Packard Motor Corporation Building	February 8, 1980 (#80003616)	317–321 North Broad Street; 39°57′31″N 75°09′41″W	Callowhill	Albert Kahn, architect (1910).
88	Park Towne Place	Park Towne Place	December 15, 2011 (#11000926)	2200 Park Towne Place; 39°57′40″N 75°10′39″W	Logan Square	Louis I. Kahn, architect
89	Penn Towers	Penn Towers	December 12, 2012 (#12001045)	1815 John F. Kennedy Boulevard; 39°57′16″N 75°10′14″W	Logan Square	
90	Pennsylvania Academy of the Fine Arts	Pennsylvania Academy of the Fine Arts	May 27, 1971 (#71000731)	Southwestern corner of Broad and Cherry Streets; 39°57′19″N 75°09′48″W	Hahnemann	Furness & Hewitt, architects (1871–76).
91	Pennsylvania Hospital	Pennsylvania Hospital	October 15, 1966 (#66000688)	8th and Spruce Streets; 39°56′41″N 75°09′21″W	Washington Square West	
92	Philadelphia City Hall	Philadelphia City Hall	December 8, 1976 (#76001666)	Penn Square, Broad and Market Streets; 39°57′08″N 75°09′49″W	Market East	John McArthur Jr. (1874–1901), architect
93	Philadelphia College of Art	Philadelphia College of Art	May 27, 1971 (#71000733)	Northwestern corner of Broad and Pine Streets; 39°56′46″N 75°09′56″W	Rittenhouse Square East	John Haviland, architect (1824–26). Frank Furness, architect of addition (1874–75).
94	Philadelphia Contributionship	Philadelphia Contributionship	May 27, 1971 (#71000732)	212 South 4th Street; 39°56′48″N 75°08′54″W	Society Hill	
95	Philadelphia Racquet Club	Philadelphia Racquet Club	August 1, 1979 (#79002326)	213–225 South 16th Street; 39°56′56″N 75°10′05″W	Rittenhouse Square East	Horace Trumbauer, architect
96	Philadelphia Savings Fund Society Building	Philadelphia Savings Fund Society Building	December 8, 1976 (#76001667)	Southwestern corner of Market and 12th Streets; 39°57′06″N 75°09′38″W	Market East	George Howe and William Lescaze, architects
97	Philadelphia School of Occupational Therapy	Philadelphia School of Occupational Therapy	June 13, 2003 (#03000528)	419 South 19th Street; 39°56′45″N 75°10′23″W	Rittenhouse Square East	
98	Philadelphia Stock Exchange	Philadelphia Stock Exchange	August 31, 1982 (#82003812)	1409–1411 Walnut Street; 39°56′59″N 75°09′54″W	Rittenhouse Square East	Horace Trumbauer, architects
99	Physicians and Dentists Building	Physicians and Dentists Building	November 5, 1987 (#87001968)	1831–1833 Chestnut Street; 39°57′07″N 75°10′17″W	Rittenhouse Square West	Wilson Brothers & Company, architects
100	Pitcairn Building	Pitcairn Building	January 7, 1988 (#87002209)	1027 Arch Street; 39°57′14″N 75°09′27″W	Chinatown	G. W. & W. D. Hewitt, architects
101	Plays and Players	Plays and Players	March 14, 1973 (#73001665)	1714 Delancey Street; 39°56′49″N 75°10′14″W	Rittenhouse Square East	
102	Portico Row	Portico Row	December 16, 1977 (#77001189)	900–930 Spruce Street; 39°56′45″N 75°09′29″W	Washington Square West	Thomas U. Walter, architect
103	Princeton Club	Princeton Club	December 4, 1980 (#80003617)	1221–1223 Locust Street; 39°56′53″N 75°09′41″W	Washington Square West	Frank Furness, architect of 1223 Locust (1890). Lindley Johnson, architect of 1221 Locust (1891)
104	Race Street Friends Meetinghouse	Race Street Friends Meetinghouse	November 4, 1993 (#93001610)	1515 Cherry Street; 39°57′21″N 75°09′54″W	Hahnemann	
105	Rafsnyder-Welsh House	Rafsnyder-Welsh House	February 14, 1980 (#80003618)	1923 Spruce Street; 39°56′53″N 75°10′27″W	Rittenhouse Square East	
106	Ramcat Historic District	Ramcat Historic District	January 8, 1986 (#86000055)	Roughly bounded by Market, 23rd, and Bainbridge Streets, and railroad yards 39°56′55″N 75°10′54″W	Rittenhouse Square West	
107	J. Sylvester Ramsey School	J. Sylvester Ramsey School	December 1, 1986 (#86003322)	Pine and Quince Streets; 39°56′42″N 75°09′37″W	Washington Square West	Destroyed see old photo at
108	Reading Terminal and Trainshed	Reading Terminal and Trainshed	June 30, 1972 (#72001170)	1115–1141 Market Street; 39°57′08″N 75°09′33″W	Market East	Francis H. Kimball and Wilson Brothers & Company, architects
109	Reynolds-Morris House	Reynolds-Morris House	December 24, 1967 (#67000020)	225 South 8th Street; 39°56′51″N 75°09′15″W	Washington Square West	
110	Ringgold Place	Ringgold Place	August 29, 1978 (#78002453)	1900 block of Waverly Street; 39°56′46″N 75°10′28″W	Rittenhouse Square East	
111	Rittenhouse Historic District	Rittenhouse Historic District	August 25, 1983 (#83002277)	Roughly bounded by Waverly, 15th, Sanson, Ludlow, 23rd, and 25th Streets; also roughly bounded by the Center City West Historic District, South Twenty-first Street, the original Rittenhouse Historic District, and South Seventeenth Street; 39°56′54″N 75°10′15″W	Rittenhouse Square East	Second set of boundaries represents a boundary increase of December 27, 2010
112	Rittenhouse Square	Rittenhouse Square	September 14, 1981 (#81000557)	Rittenhouse Square and 18th Street; 39°56′57″N 75°10′20″W	Rittenhouse Square East	
113	Roberts-Quay House	Roberts-Quay House	November 13, 1976 (#76001668)	1035–1037 Spruce Street; 39°56′47″N 75°09′35″W	Washington Square West	
114	Rohm and Haas Corporate Headquarters	Rohm and Haas Corporate Headquarters	February 9, 2007 (#07000031)	100 Independence Mall West; 39°57′01″N 75°09′05″W	Independence Mall	
115	St. Augustine's Catholic Church	St. Augustine's Catholic Church	June 15, 1976 (#76001670)	4th and New Streets; 39°57′20″N 75°08′47″W	Old City	Napoleon LeBrun, architect
116	St. Clement's Protestant Episcopal Church	St. Clement's Protestant Episcopal Church	November 20, 1970 (#70000555)	Southwestern corner of 20th and Cherry Streets; 39°57′23″N 75°10′23″W	Logan Square	John Notman, architect
117	St. George's Methodist Church	St. George's Methodist Church	May 27, 1971 (#71000064)	324 New Street; 39°57′19″N 75°08′46″W	Old City	
118	St. James Hotel	St. James Hotel	November 13, 1976 (#76001671)	1226–1232 Walnut Street; 39°56′56″N 75°09′43″W	Washington Square West	Horace Trumbauer, architect (1901)
119	St. Mark's Episcopal Church	St. Mark's Episcopal Church	April 19, 1982 (#82003815)	1607–1627 Locust Street; 39°56′56″N 75°10′07″W	Rittenhouse Square East	John Notman, architect
120	St. Peter's Church	St. Peter's Church	June 18, 1996 (#96000969)	Junction of 3rd and Pine Streets; 39°56′35″N 75°08′52″W	Society Hill	
121	St. Stephen's Episcopal Church	St. Stephen's Episcopal Church	June 4, 1979 (#79002329)	19 South 10th Street; 39°57′03″N 75°09′24″W	Market East	William Strickland, architect
122	Second Bank of the United States	Second Bank of the United States	May 4, 1987 (#87001293)	420 Chestnut Street; 39°56′55″N 75°08′54″W	Independence Mall	William Strickland, architect
123	Smyth Young Field Company Building	Smyth Young Field Company Building	December 24, 1992 (#92001720)	1216–1220 Arch Street; 39°57′14″N 75°09′37″W	Chinatown	
124	Social Service Building	Social Service Building	February 20, 2002 (#02000063)	311 South Juniper Street; 39°56′46″N 75°09′49″W	Washington Square West	Horace Trumbauer, architect
125	Society Hill Historic District	Society Hill Historic District	June 23, 1971 (#71000065)	Bounded on the north by Walnut St., on the south by Lombard St., on the east by the pier line of the Delaware River, and on the west by 8th 39°56′42″N 75°08′58″W	Society Hill	
126	Solomon House	Solomon House	August 24, 1978 (#78002454)	130–132 South 17th Street; 39°57′02″N 75°10′09″W	Rittenhouse Square East	Frank Furness, architect (1887).
127	John Stewart Houses	John Stewart Houses	November 20, 1979 (#79002330)	1020–1028 Spruce Street; 39°56′46″N 75°09′32″W	Washington Square West	
128	William Strickland Row	William Strickland Row	September 14, 1977 (#77001192)	215–227 South 9th Street; 39°56′51″N 75°09′21″W	Washington Square West	William Strickland, architect
129	Suburban Station Building	Suburban Station Building	September 5, 1985 (#85001962)	1617 John F. Kennedy Boulevard; 39°57′15″N 75°10′03″W	Logan Square	
130	Thomas Sully Residence	Thomas Sully Residence	October 15, 1966 (#66000691)	530 Spruce Street; 39°56′42″N 75°09′05″W	Society Hill	
131	Sun Oil Building	Sun Oil Building	August 25, 1983 (#83002280)	1608–1610 Walnut Street; 39°56′59″N 75°10′05″W	Rittenhouse Square East	
132	The Touraine	The Touraine	April 7, 1982 (#82003816)	1520 Spruce Street; 39°56′50″N 75°10′03″W	Rittenhouse Square East	
133	Union League of Philadelphia	Union League of Philadelphia	June 22, 1979 (#79002331)	140 South Broad Street; 39°56′57″N 75°09′52″W	Rittenhouse Square East	John Fraser, architect
134	United States Custom House	United States Custom House	May 25, 2011 (#11000310)	200 Chestnut St. 39°56′53″N 75°08′40″W	Independence Mall	
135	US Court House and Post Office Building	US Court House and Post Office Building	October 19, 1990 (#90001540)	900 Market St. 39°57′04″N 75°09′20″W	Market East	
136	USS BECUNA (SS–319)	USS BECUNA (SS–319)	August 29, 1978 (#78002458)	Penn's Landing, Delaware Avenue, and Spruce Street; 39°56′36″N 75°08′29″W	Penn's Landing	
137	U.S.S. OLYMPIA	U.S.S. OLYMPIA	October 15, 1966 (#66000692)	Pier 40 at foot of Chestnut Street; 39°56′36″N 75°08′28″W	Penn's Landing	
138	Walnut-Chancellor Historic District	Walnut-Chancellor Historic District	December 1, 1980 (#80003605)	20th-21st, Walnut and Chancellor Streets; 39°57′02″N 75°10′33″W	Rittenhouse Square West	
139	Walnut Street Theatre	Walnut Street Theatre	October 15, 1966 (#66000693)	9th and Walnut Streets; 39°56′54″N 75°09′20″W	Washington Square West	John Haviland, architect
140	John Wanamaker Store	John Wanamaker Store	June 2, 1978 (#78002459)	Juniper and Market Streets; 39°57′06″N 75°09′44″W	Market East	Daniel Burnham, architect
141	Warburton House	Warburton House	August 22, 2002 (#02000890)	1929 Sansom Street; 39°57′05″N 75°10′24″W	Rittenhouse Square East	
142	The Warwick	The Warwick	August 10, 1978 (#78002460)	1701 Locust Street; 39°56′56″N 75°10′10″W	Rittenhouse Square East	
143	Washington Square	Washington Square	September 14, 1981 (#81000558)	Locust and 6th streets 39°56′49″N 75°09′10″W	Independence Mall	
144	Washington Square West Historic District	Washington Square West Historic District	September 20, 1984 (#84003563)	Roughly bounded by 8th, Locust, Broad, and Lombard Streets; 39°56′44″N 75°09′40″W	Washington Square West	
145	Waverly Garage	Waverly Garage	April 17, 2018 (#100002343)	414-422 S 16th St. 39°56′44″N 75°10′06″W	Rittenhouse Square East	
146	WCAU Studios	WCAU Studios	January 27, 1983 (#83002281)	1618–1622 Chestnut Street; 39°57′04″N 75°10′05″W	Rittenhouse Square East	
147	Wesley AME Zion Church	Wesley AME Zion Church	December 1, 1978 (#78002461)	1500 Lombard Street; 39°56′41″N 75°10′02″W	Rittenhouse Square East	
148	Wesley Building	Wesley Building	May 10, 1984 (#84003581)	1701–1709 Arch Street; 39°57′18″N 75°10′06″W	Logan Square	
149	Witherspoon Building	Witherspoon Building	September 18, 1978 (#78002462)	1319–1323 Walnut Street; 39°56′58″N 75°09′48″W	Market East	Joseph Miller Huston, architect (1895–97).
150	Young Men's Christian Association	Young Men's Christian Association	December 2, 1980 (#80003624)	115 North 15th Street; 39°57′18″N 75°09′53″W	Hahnemann	

== Former listings ==
	Name on the Register	Image	Date listed	Date removed	Location	City or town	Description
1	Elks Lodge BPOE No. 2	Elks Lodge BPOE No. 2	August 23, 1984 (#84003535)	June 23, 2023	306–320 North Broad Street; 39°57′30″N 75°09′46″W	Callowhill	Replaced by a parking lot
2	Old Drexel Building		September 5, 1975 (#75001663)	February 14, 1978	34 S. 3rd Street		Demolished
3	Jayne Estate Building	Jayne Estate Building	April 30, 1987 (#87000648)	January 18, 2011	2–16 Vine Street; 39°57′19″N 75°08′23″W	Penn's Landing	Demolished
4	Gilbert Building	Gilbert Building	July 17, 1986 (#86001688)	January 18, 2011	1315–1329 Cherry Street; 39°57′19″N 75°09′42″W	Chinatown	Demolished in 2007 for the Pennsylvania Convention Center expansion.
5	Harrison Building	Harrison Building	July 29, 1983 (#83002271)	June 27, 1986	1001–1023 Filbert Street; 39°57′09″N 75°09′25″W	Market East	Cope & Stewardson, architects. Destroyed by fire on May 2, 1984. Now the site of the Greyhound Bus terminal.
6	Joseph Sims House		November 14, 1977 (#77001191)	January 4, 1978	228 S. 9th Street(original location); 39°56′49″N 75°09′17″W	Philadelphia	Delisted due to relocation to 236 S. 8th Street in 1978
7	Walter M. Steppacher and Brother Shirt Factory	Walter M. Steppacher and Brother Shirt Factory	March 18, 2004 (#04000193)	January 18, 2011	148 North 13th Street; 39°57′20″N 75°09′39″W	Chinatown	Demolished for the Pennsylvania Convention Center expansion
8	Twelfth Street Meetinghouse	Twelfth Street Meetinghouse	January 25, 1971 (#74002334)	1974	20 S. 12th Street(original location); 40°12′41″N 74°56′02″W	Center City, Philadelphia	Delisted after being dismantled and relocated to George School in Newtown, Bucks County, Pennsylvania.
9	John Wanamaker House	John Wanamaker House	December 6, 1971 (#78003441)	March 30, 1978	2032 Walnut Street; 39°57′01″N 75°10′33″W	Rittenhouse Square	Theophilus P. Chandler Jr., architect. Demolished following a fire; the facade survives.

== See also ==
- List of National Historic Landmarks in Philadelphia
- National Register of Historic Places listings in Philadelphia, Pennsylvania
- Philadelphia Register of Historic Places
