= Head House =

A head house is an enclosed building attached to an open-sided shed.

Head House may refer to:

- Head House (Prescott, Arizona), listed on the National Register of Historic Places in Yavapai County, Arizona
- Head House (Middletown, Kentucky), listed on the National Register of Historic Places in Jefferson County, Kentucky
- the Head House of Head House Square, a National Register of Historic Places-listed historic district in Philadelphia, Pennsylvania
