= Professional Building =

Professional Building can refer to:

- Professional Building (Phoenix, Arizona), listed on the NRHP in Arizona
- Professional Building (West Palm Beach, Florida), listed on the NRHP in Florida
- Professional Building (Waterville, Maine), listed on the NRHP in Maine
- Professional Building (Kansas City, Missouri), listed on the NRHP in Missouri
- Professional Building (Raleigh, North Carolina), listed on the NRHP in North Carolina
- Physicians and Dentists Building, also known as Professional Building, Philadelphia, Pennsylvania, listed on the NRHP in Pennsylvania
- Working Benevolent Temple and Professional Building, Greenville, SC, listed on the NRHP in South Carolina
- Professional Building (Suffolk, Virginia), listed on the NRHP in Virginia
