= St. James Hotel =

St. James Hotel may refer to:

- St. James Hotel (Jacksonville, Florida), a destroyed hotel, the site of the St. James Building
- St. James Hotel (Red Wing, Minnesota), listed on the National Register of Historic Places (NRHP)
- St. James Hotel (Cimarron, New Mexico)
- St. James Hotel (Philadelphia), listed on the NRHP
- St. James Hotel (San Diego), part of the Gaslamp Quarter Historic District
- St James's Hotel and Club, London
