= J. Peter Lesley House =

Historic house in Pennsylvania, United States

- U.S. National Register of Historic Places
- U.S. National Historic Landmark
- U.S. Historic district – Contributing property
- U.S. Historic district – Contributing property
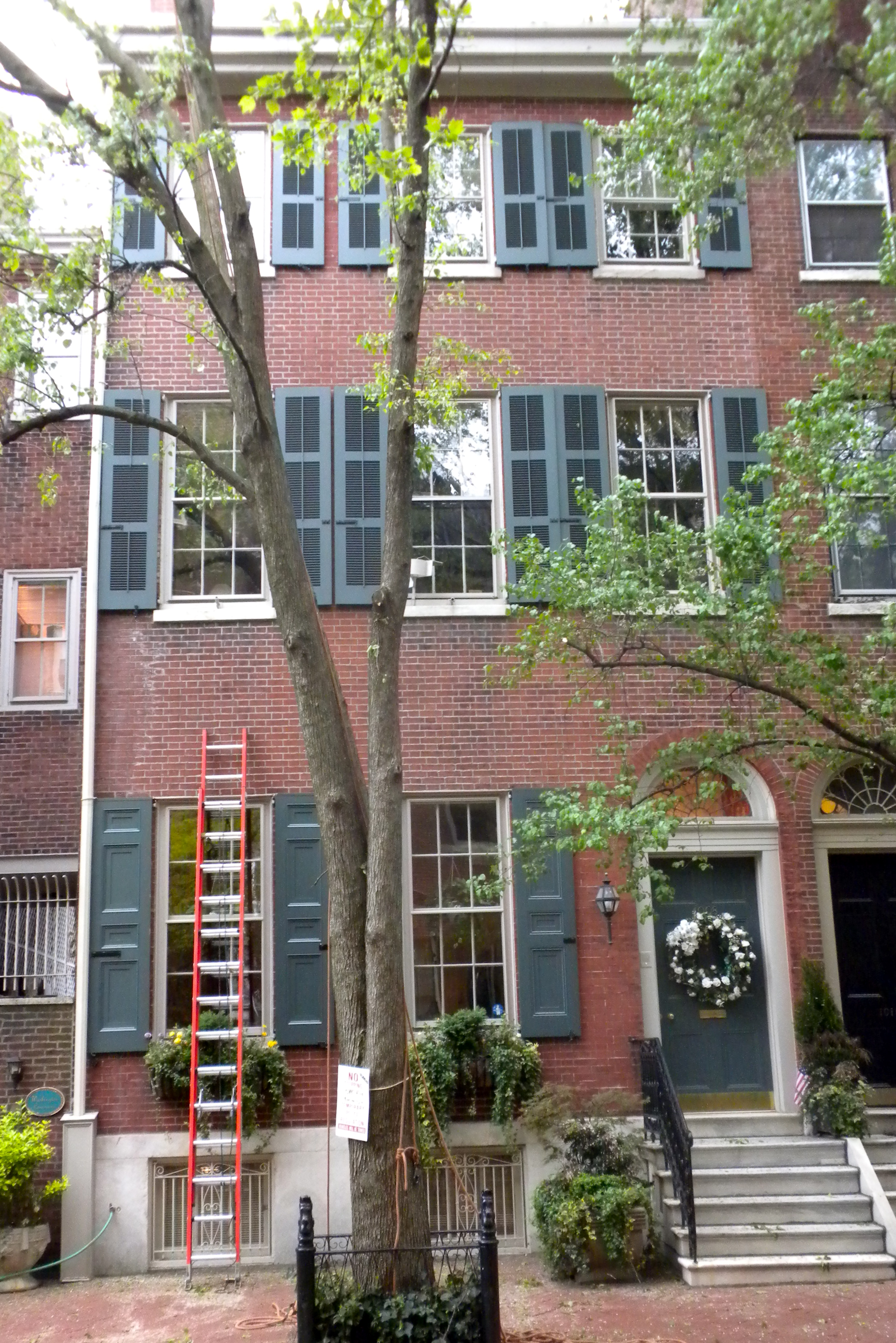

- Location within Philadelphia Location within Pennsylvania Location within the United States
- Location: 1008 Clinton Street, Philadelphia, Pennsylvania
- Coordinates: 39°56′40″N 75°9′29″W
- Area: less than an acre
- Built: c. 1836
- Architectural style: Greek Revival
- Part of: Clinton Street Historic District; Washington Square West Historic District; (ID72001148, 84003563)
- NRHP reference No.: 94001646

Significant dates
- Added to NRHP: October 12, 1994
- Designated NHL: October 12, 1994
- Designated CP: April 26, 1972
- Designated CP: September 20, 1984

The J. Peter Lesley House is a historic row house at 1008 Clinton Street in the Washington Square neighborhood of Philadelphia, Pennsylvania, USA. A National Historic Landmark, it was for 27 years the home of John Peter Lesley (1819–1903), one of the leading geologists of the second half of the 19th century. The house is a private residence, and is not open to the public.

== Description and history ==
The J. Peter Lesley House is located in Philadelphia's Washington Square West neighborhood, on the south side of Clinton Street between South 10th and 11th Streets. It is a 3 1/2-story brick building, with a gabled roof pierced in front by a gabled dormer, and flanked on the side walls by chimneys. It is three bays wide, with the entrance in the rightmost bay, topped by a Federal style half-round transom window. The interior of the house largely retains features of the later 19th century, despite conversion to multiunit residences and back to single-family use.

J. Peter Lesley rented this building from 1869 to 1897, using it as his home and office. Lesley served for many years as the State Geologist of Pennsylvania, and was a leading authority on geology related to coal and iron ore, especially in Pennsylvania and surrounding states. His pioneering work A Manual of Coal, published in 1856, demonstrated the relationship between topography and geological structure. He supervised the publication of more than 120 state reports produced by its Geological Survey department, which he also directed for many years.

The Lesleys made this address their year-round home until 1885, when Mrs. Lesley was given a house in Milton, Massachusetts. He continued to spend most of his days here until ill health compelled his retirement in 1896, after which he also moved permanently to Massachusetts.

== See also ==
- List of National Historic Landmarks in Philadelphia
- National Register of Historic Places listings in Center City, Philadelphia
