= Edward Drinker Cope House =

Historic house in Pennsylvania, United States

- Edward D. Cope House
- U.S. National Register of Historic Places
- U.S. National Historic Landmark
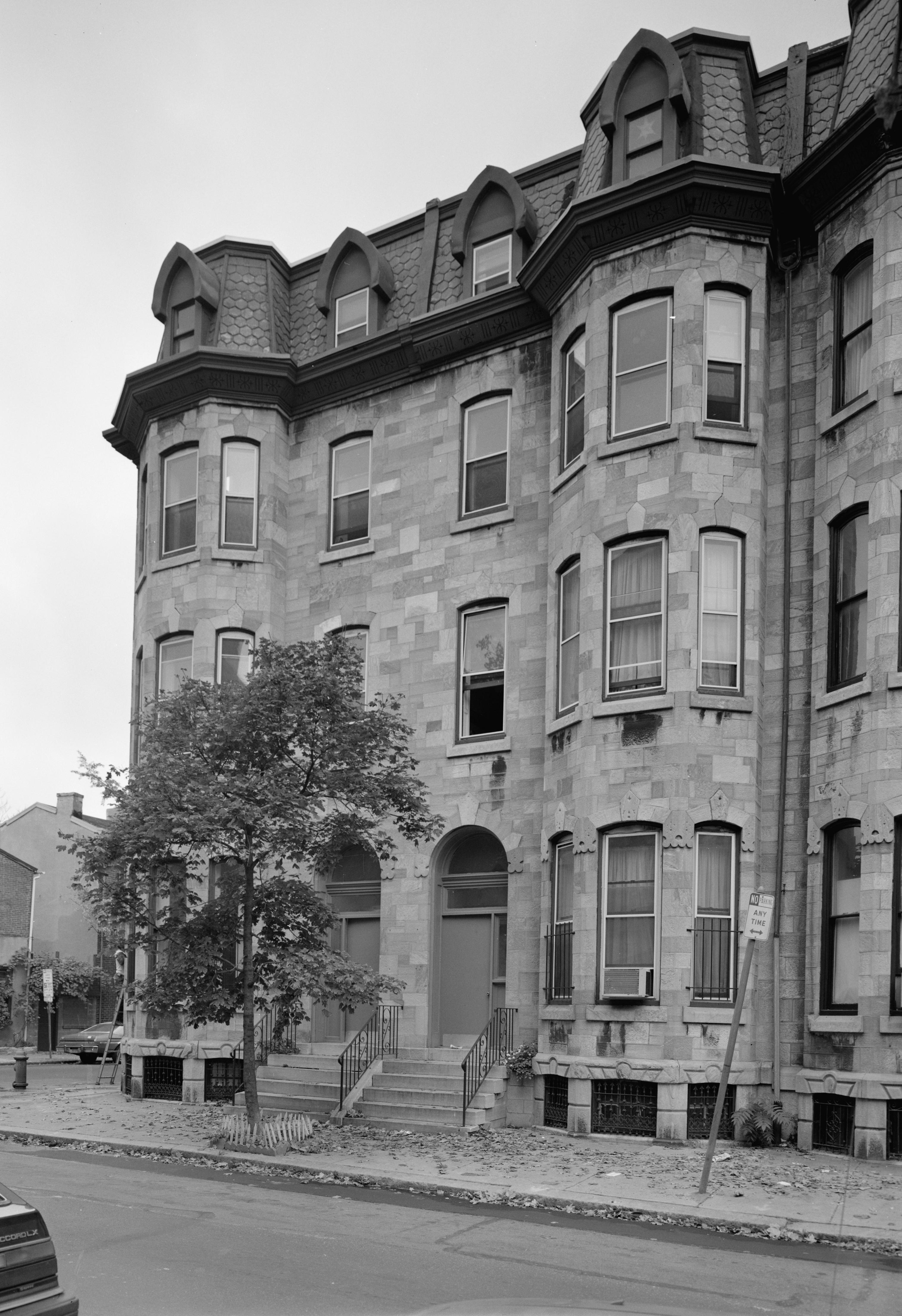
- 2100–2102 Pine Street

- Location within Philadelphia Location within Pennsylvania Location within the United States
- Location: 2102 Pine St., Philadelphia, Pennsylvania
- Coordinates: 39°56′49.21″N 75°10′36.14″W
- Built: 1880
- Architectural style: Second Empire
- NRHP reference No.: 75001660

Significant dates
- Added to NRHP: May 15, 1975
- Designated NHL: May 15, 1975

The Edward Drinker Cope House is a historic house located at 2100–2102 Pine Street in Center City Philadelphia, Pennsylvania. Built in 1880, it was a longtime home of Edward Drinker Cope (1840–1897), a prolific geologist and paleontologist and noted herpetologist who was one of the leading natural scientists of the 19th century United States. It was declared a National Historic Landmark in 1975.

== Description and history ==
The Edward Drinker Cope House consists of two side-by-side rowhouses at the southwest corner of 21st and Pine Streets, southwest of Rittenhouse Square in Philadelphia's Center City. It is 3.5 stories in height with a larger ceiling at the top floor. The front facades are clad with rectangular cut green stone laid in random courses. The side and rear sides are brick and it is topped with a mansard roof. The main facade has polygonal bays on the outside and a pair of arched entrances in the center bays.

The rowhouses were purchased by Cope shortly after their construction in 1880. He at first lived at 2100, using 2102 as storage and a work room. Financial reverses due to a poor investment in 1886 forced him to rent 2100 out, and he occupied 2102 until his death in 1897. The Pine Street home was filled with Cope's papers, bones, stuffed and mounted animals, and specimens preserved in alcohol that covered his desks and an improvised shelf in his bathroom. Cope was a prolific and talented scientist, distinguishing himself in the field of paleontology, where he was one of the leading figures in the infamous Bone Wars competition that characterized the scientific investigations of the American West in the 1870s. He is ranked with Othniel Marsh and Joseph Leidy as one of the nation's leading 19th-century paleontologists.

== Gallery ==
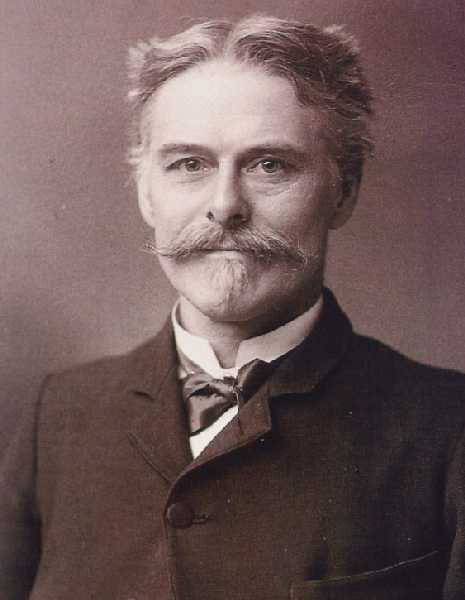
Edward Drinker Cope

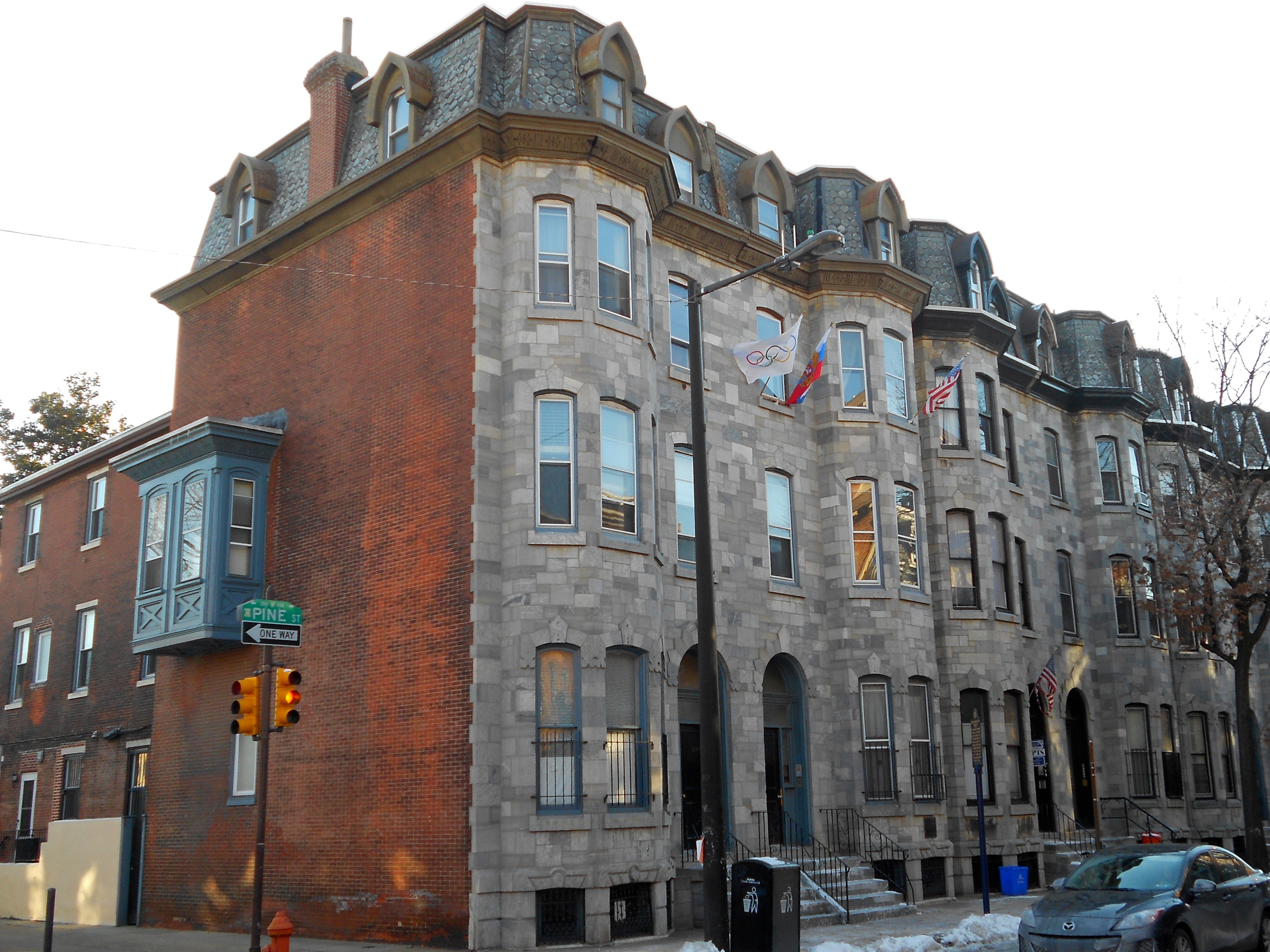
NE view

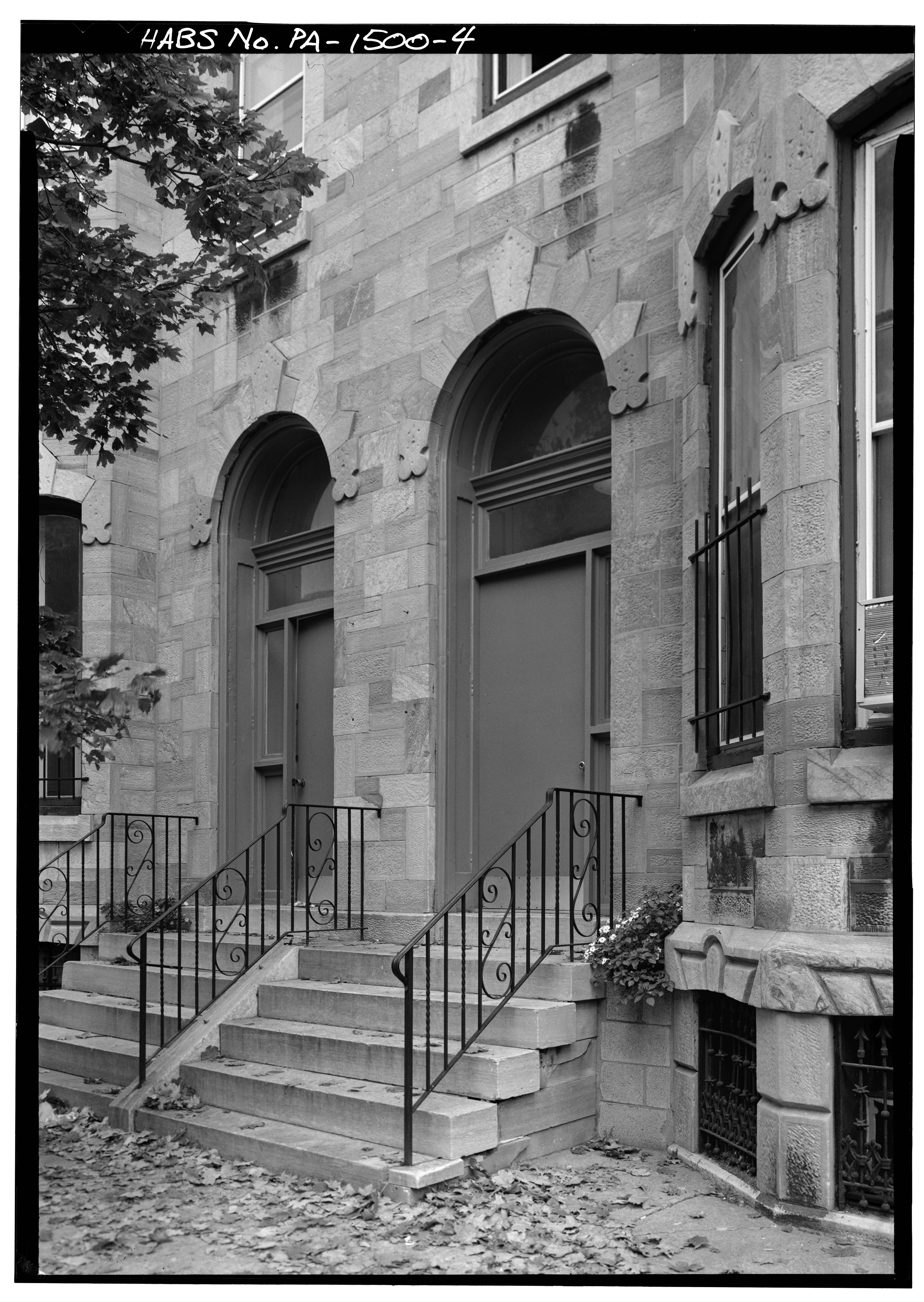
Front entrances

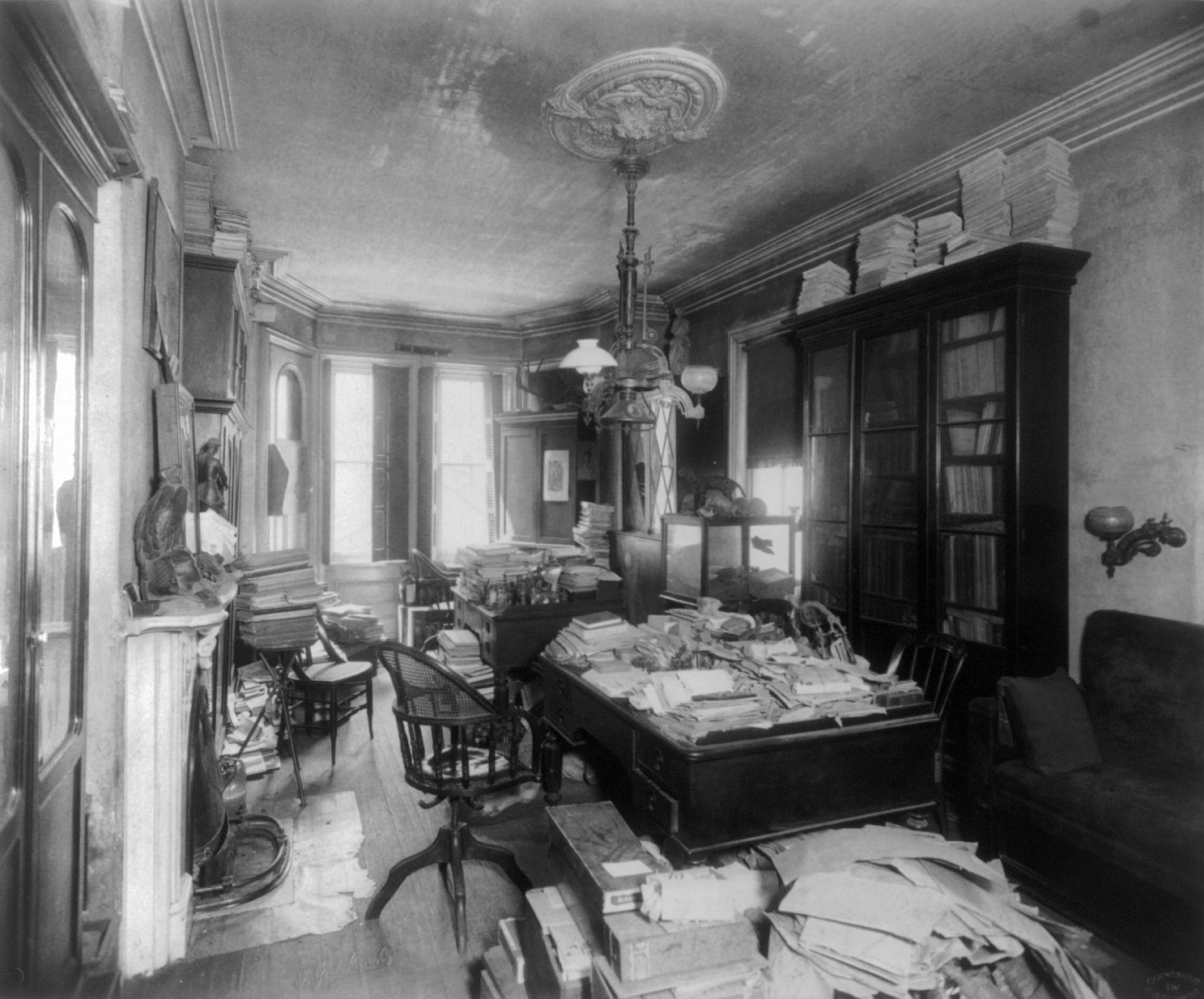
Cope's cluttered study in 1897

== See also ==
- List of National Historic Landmarks in Philadelphia
- National Register of Historic Places listings in Center City, Philadelphia
