= Amalgamated Center =

- U.S. National Register of Historic Places
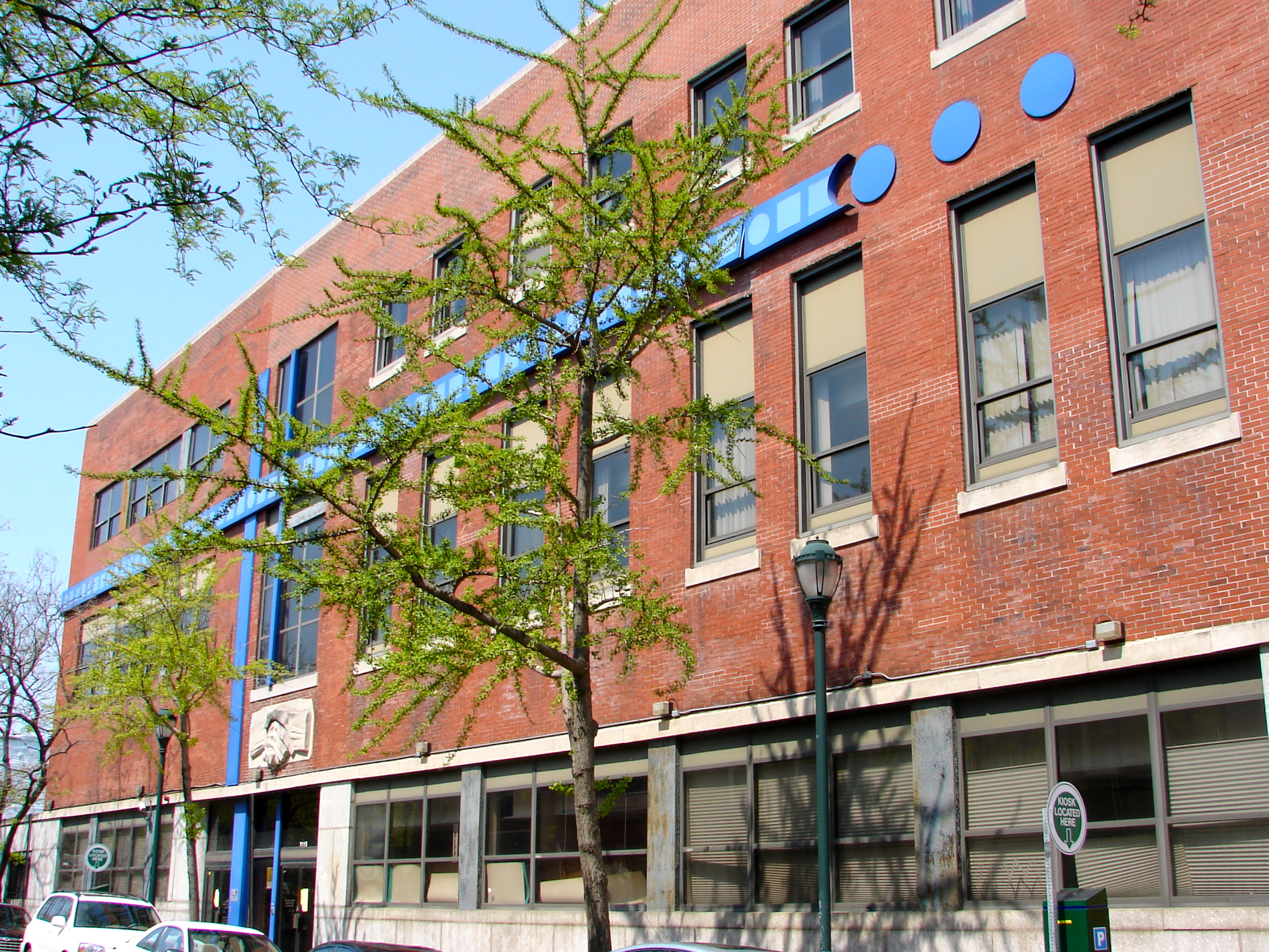

- Location within Philadelphia Location within Pennsylvania Location within the United States
- Location: 2101-2143 South Street, Philadelphia, Pennsylvania
- Coordinates: 39°56′42″N 75°10′40″W
- Area: less than one acre
- Built: 1900
- Architect: Magaziner and Eberhand
- Architectural style: Moderne
- NRHP reference No.: 08001269
- Added to NRHP: December 30, 2008

The Amalgamated Center, also known as the Amalgamated Clothing Workers of America Office Building, was built by the Bethany Brotherhood, which was funded by John Wanamaker, in 1900, in Philadelphia. An addition to the building was added in 1912, and it served as a working class social club and community center.

In 1934, the building was sold to the Amalgamated Clothing Workers of America labor union which expanded the building in 1937 and 1967. During the 1980s, the building was made into doctors' offices and a day care center.

The building was listed on the National Register of Historic Places in 2008.

== See also ==
- National Register of Historic Places listings in Center City, Philadelphia
