= Boekel Building =

- U.S. National Register of Historic Places
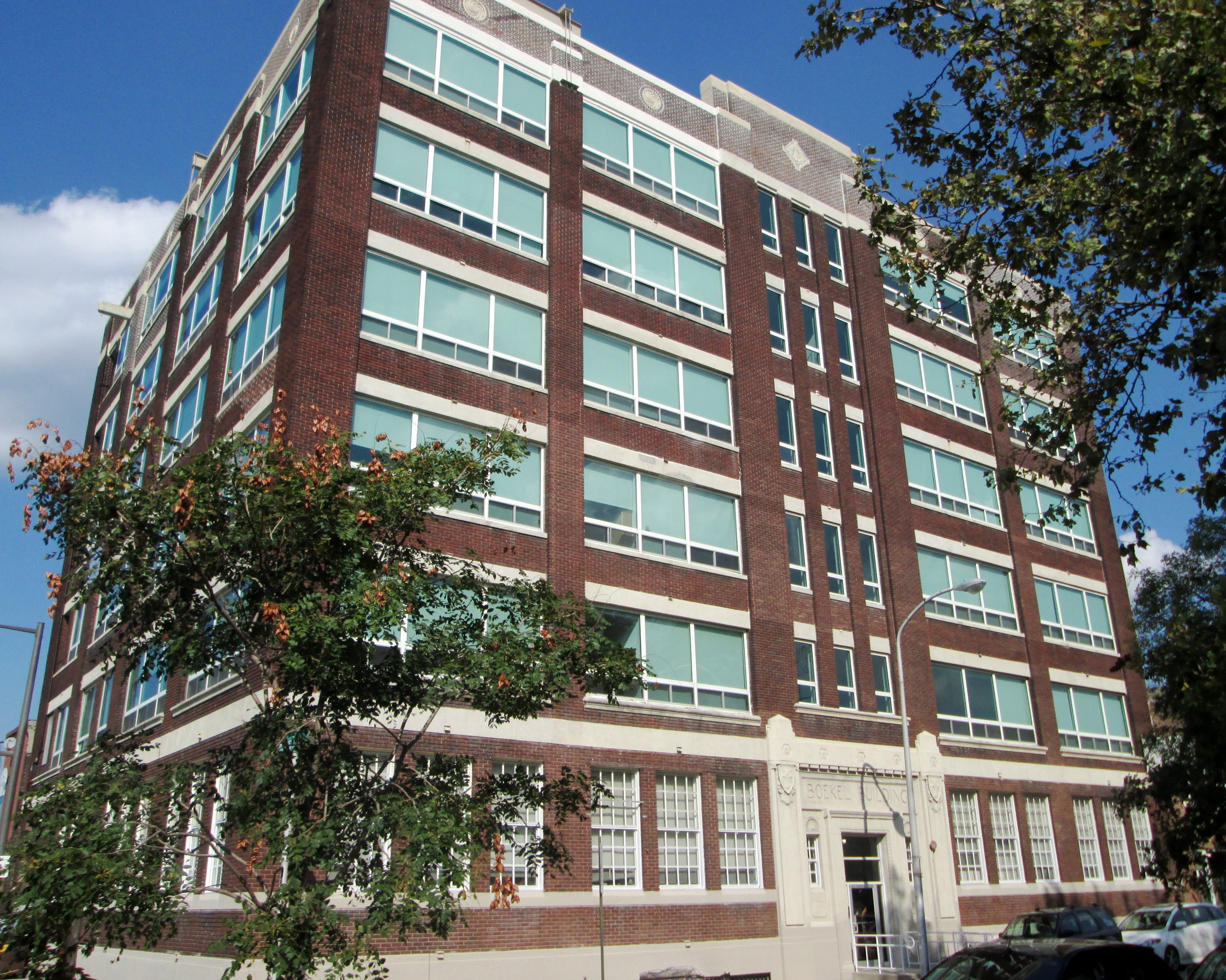
- (2013)

- Location within Philadelphia Location within Pennsylvania Location within the United States
- Location: 505–515 Vine St. Philadelphia, Pennsylvania
- Coordinates: 39°57′23″N 75°8′54″W
- Built: 1922–23
- Architect: Clarence Wunder
- Architectural style: Early Commercial
- NRHP reference No.: 03000078
- Added to NRHP: February 20, 2003

The Boekel Building is a historic factory building located in the Old City neighborhood of Philadelphia, Pennsylvania at 505–515 Vine Street, west of North 5th Street. It was built in 1922–23, and is a six-story, reinforced concrete building clad in brick with terra cotta details. It features massive brick piers and broad banks of windows; the windows were replaced in 1992.

The building was added to the National Register of Historic Places in 2003.

== See also ==
- National Register of Historic Places listings in Center City, Philadelphia
