= First Troop Philadelphia City Cavalry Armory =

Historic military building

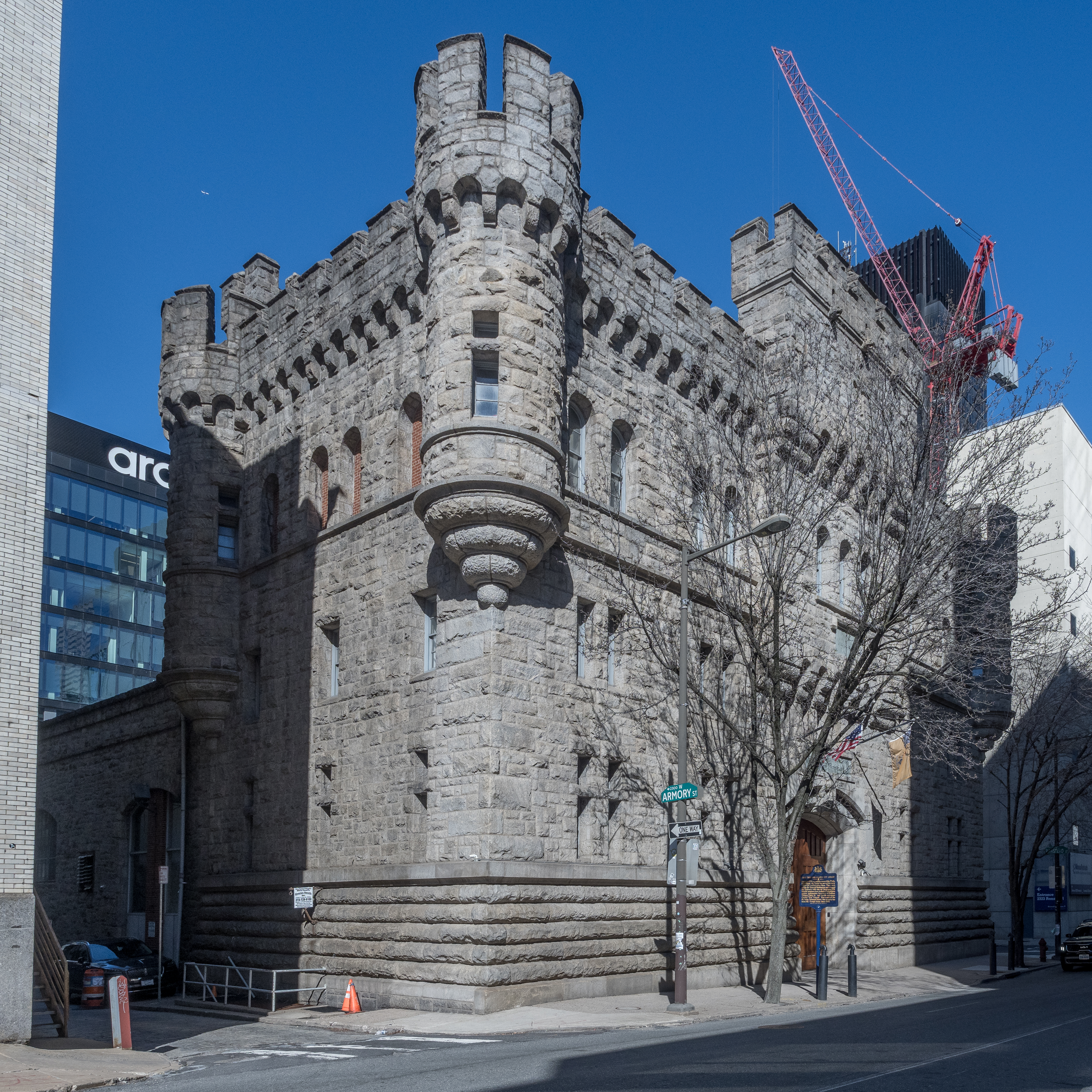
Armory in 2024

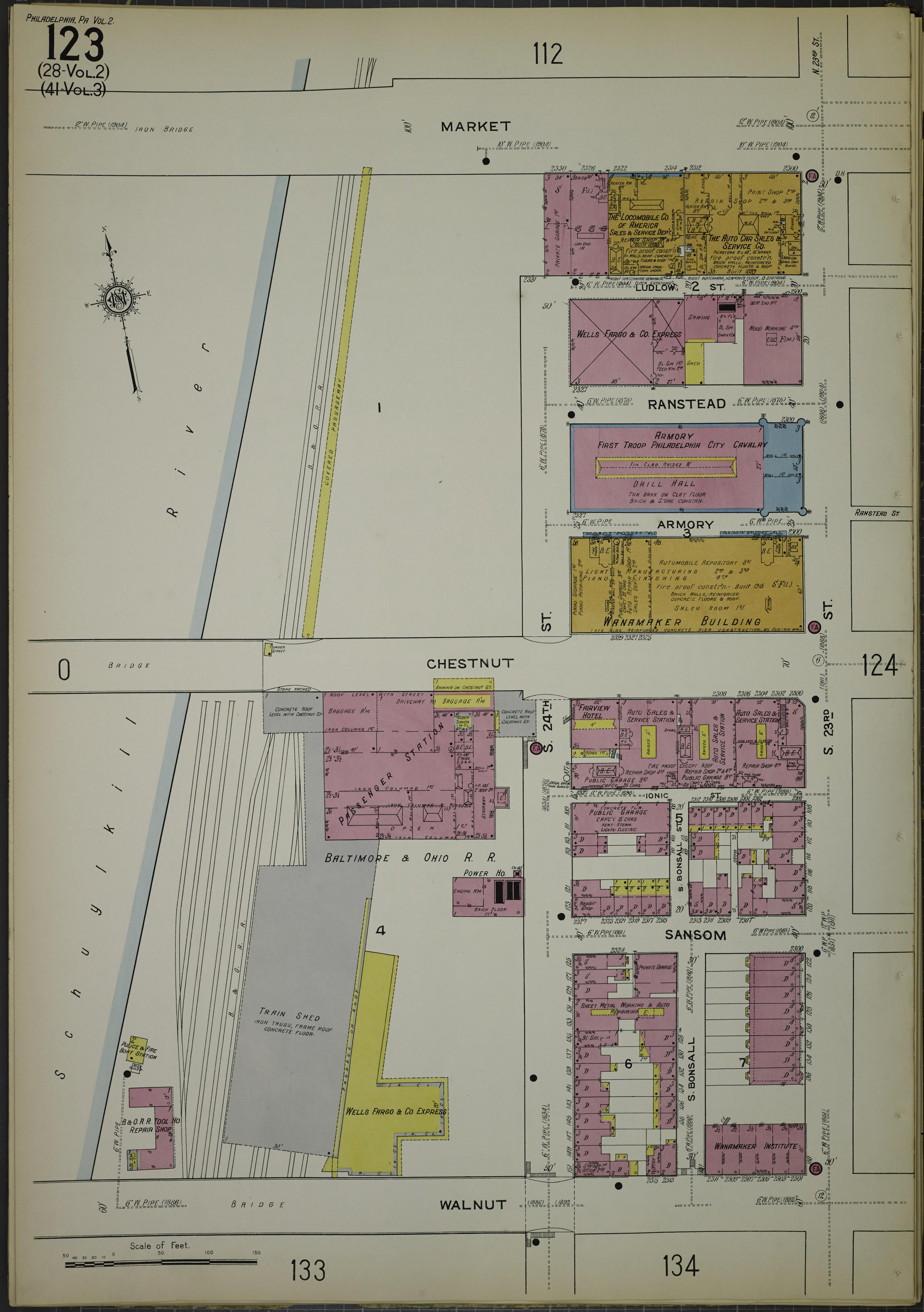
1913 insurance map

The First Troop Philadelphia City Cavalry Armory is an armory building used by the First Troop Philadelphia City Cavalry in Philadelphia, Pennsylvania. It was built in 1901. It is listed on the National Register of Historic Places and is the oldest military building in the United States that is still in service.

The Armory building is at 22-42 South 23rd Street. It is made of granite and it faces Chestnut Street.

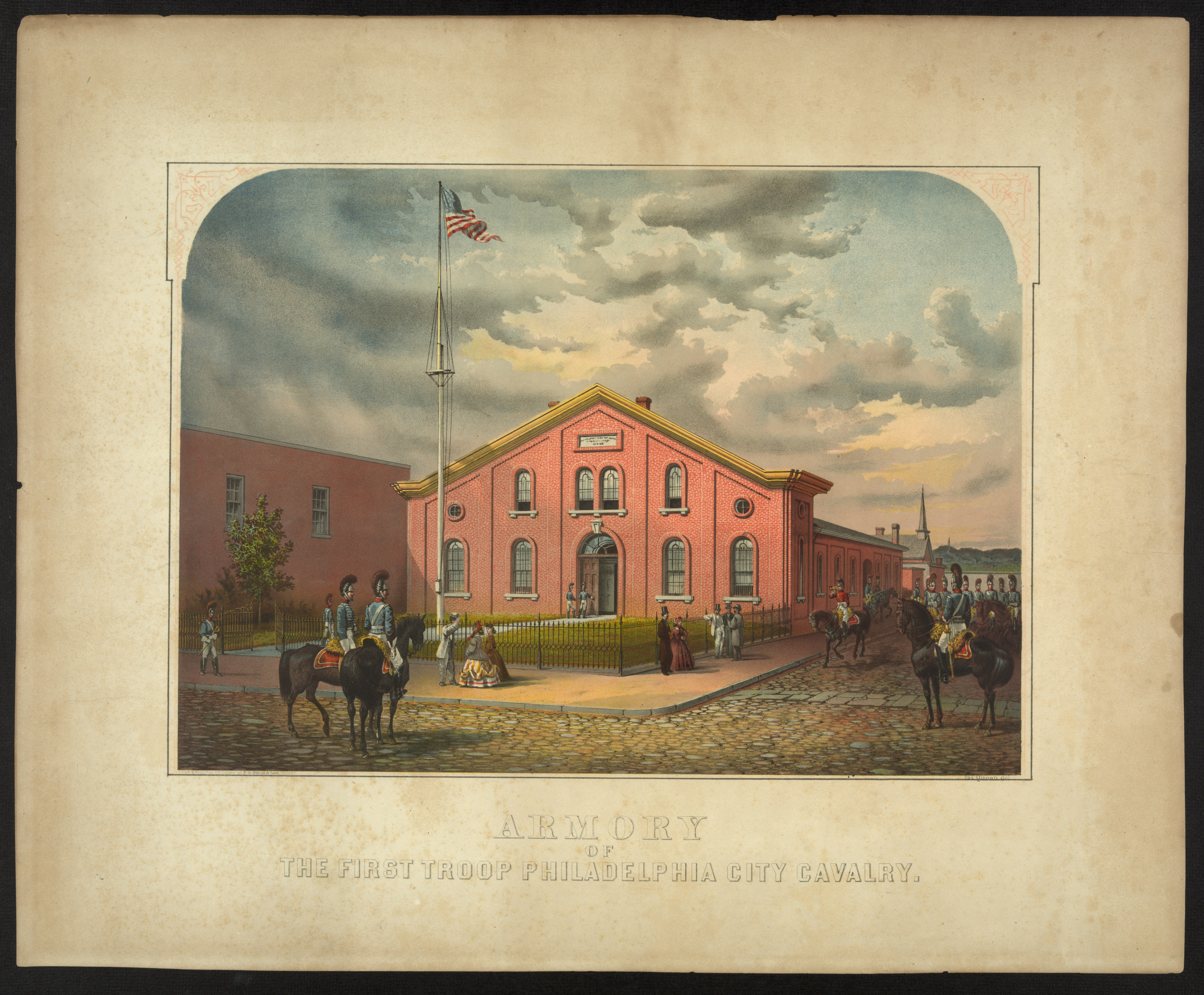
Troop Philadelphia City Cavalry Armory in 1863

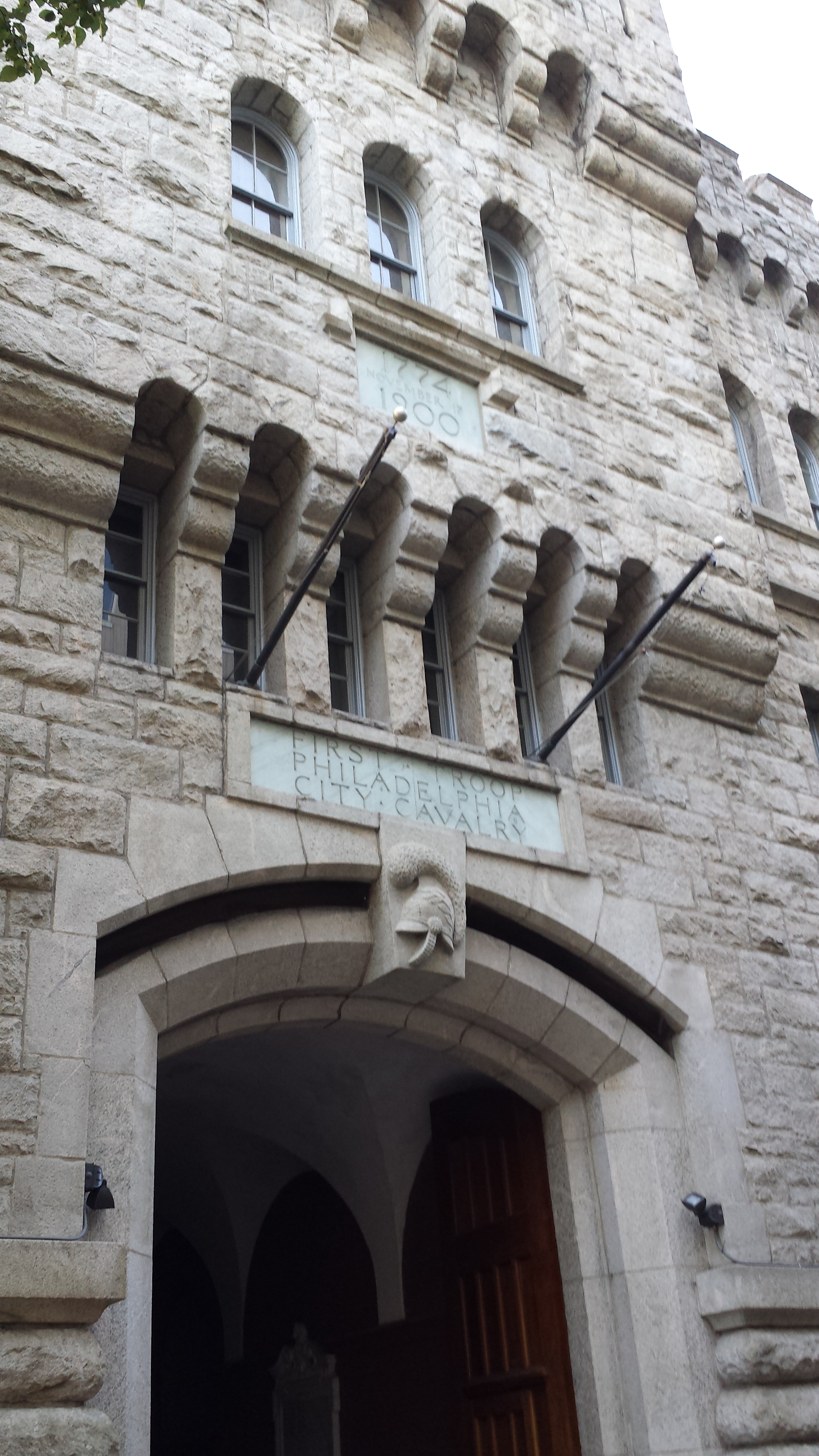
Entrance

Newman, Woodman & Harris were the architects of the building.

A multiple property nomination for Pennsylvania's National Guard armory buildings was made to the National Register of Historic Places.

== See also ==
- Rittenhouse Club
- Rittenhouse Square
- National Register of Historic Places listings in Philadelphia
- National Register of Historic Places listings in Center City, Philadelphia
