= Globe Ticket Company Building =

- U.S. National Register of Historic Places
- Location within Philadelphia Location within Pennsylvania Location within the United States
- Location: 112 N. 12th Street, Philadelphia, Pennsylvania
- Coordinates: 39°57′11″N 75°9′28″W
- Area: 0.5 acres (0.20 ha)
- Built: 1899
- Architect: Peale, Henry, Jr.; Ballinger Co.
- Architectural style: Commercial
- NRHP reference No.: 84000268
- Added to NRHP: November 01, 1984

The Globe Ticket Company Building was completed at 112 North 12th Street in Philadelphia, Pennsylvania, United States, in 1900 as a printing and warehouse facility for the Globe Ticket Company , which exclusively printed tickets. The building was liquidated and demolished in 1988 to make way for the convention center.

The Pennsylvania Convention Center now occupies the site and all nearby land. The building was listed on the National Register of Historic Places in 1984, and has not been delisted.

The building was also known as the Hering building and featured an inscription to Constantine Hering, a homeopathic physician, in Latin.

== See also ==
- National Register of Historic Places listings in Center City, Philadelphia
