= John Stewart Houses (Philadelphia, Pennsylvania) =

Historic houses in Pennsylvania, United States

- U.S. National Register of Historic Places
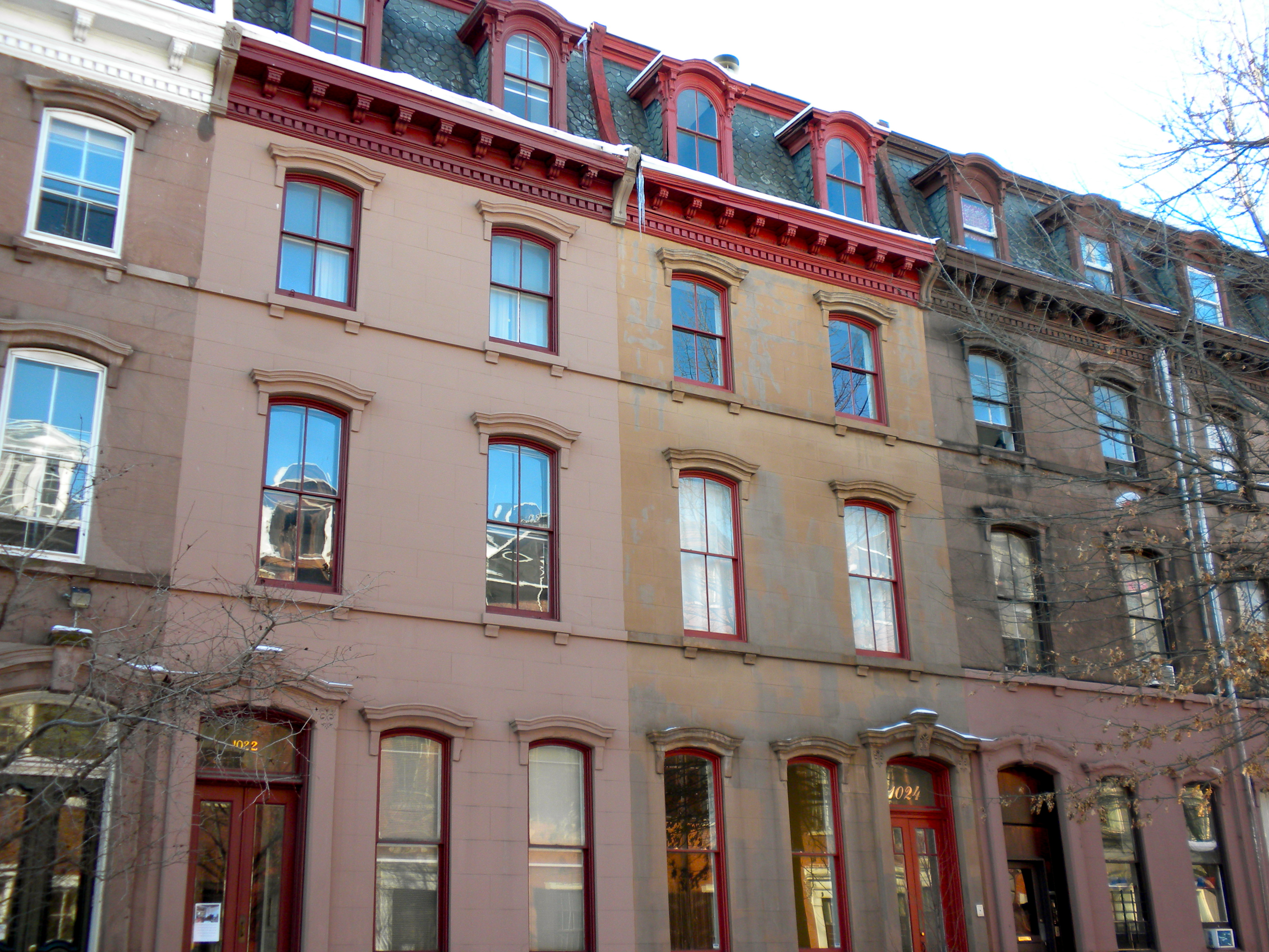

- Location within Pennsylvania
- Location: 1020–1028 Spruce Street, Philadelphia, Pennsylvania
- Coordinates: 39°56′46″N 75°9′31.5″W
- Built: 1870
- Architect: John Stewart, Henry Phillippi
- Architectural style: Italianate
- NRHP reference No.: 79002330
- Added to NRHP: November 20, 1979

The John Stewart Houses are a set of five rowhouses in Center City, Philadelphia, Pennsylvania. They were all built in 1870 using the same Italianate design by Philadelphia architect John Stewart. They were listed on the National Register of Historic Places on November 20, 1979.

Stewart bought the lots in 1870, while he, according to the deed, took out a $61,000 loan for construction of the buildings. Henry Phillippi, a carpenter who was apparently the contractor for the houses, received partial interest in several of them in the early 1870s. After Stewart died, the completed houses were sold in a sheriff's sale in 1874.

== See also ==
- National Register of Historic Places listings in Center City, Philadelphia
