= New Market and Head House =

Historic house in Pennsylvania, United States

- New Market
- U.S. National Register of Historic Places
- U.S. National Historic Landmark
- U.S. Historic district – Contributing property
- Philadelphia Register of Historic Places
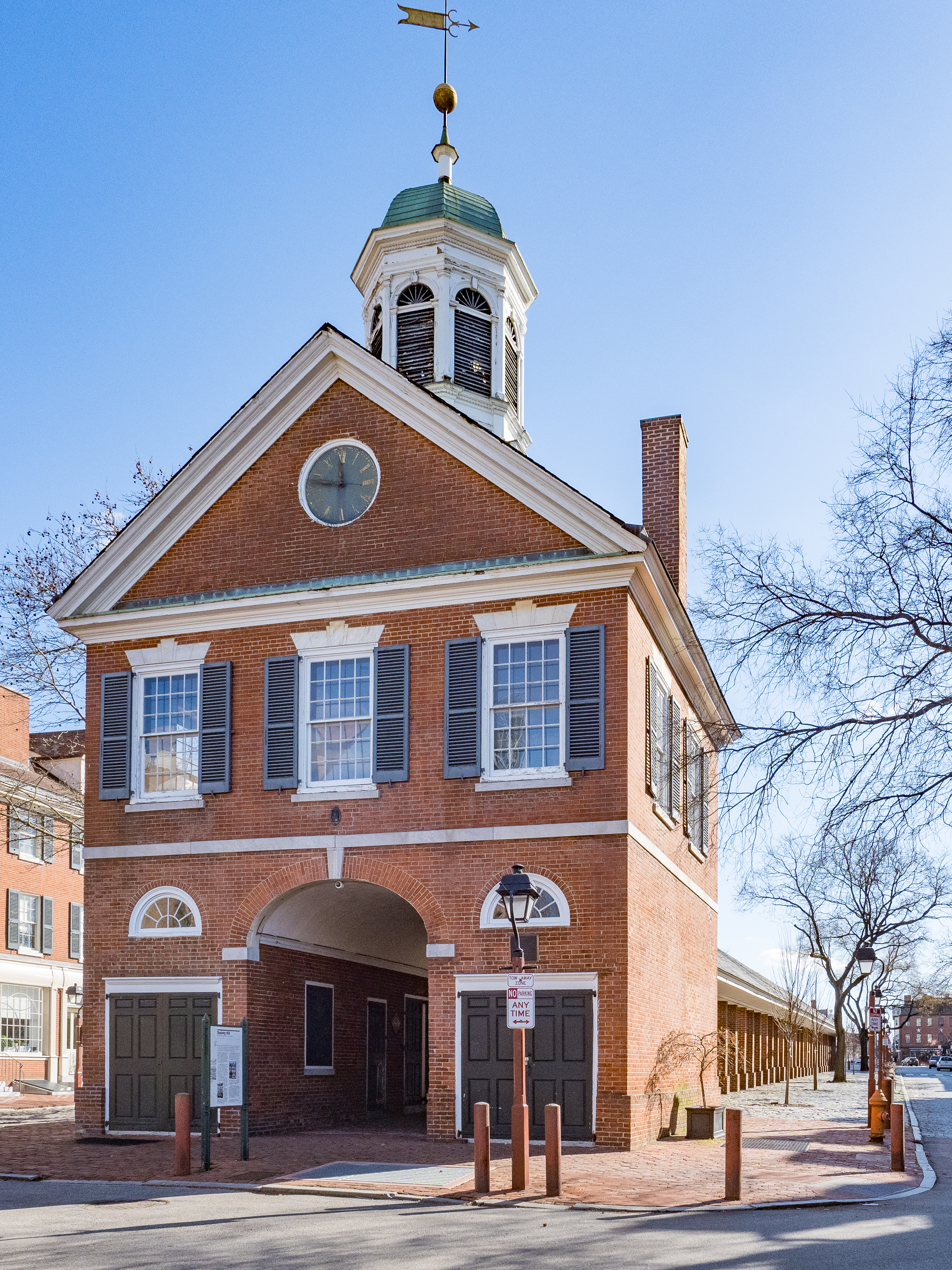
- Head House (left) and market sheds (right) (2024)

- Location within Philadelphia Location within Pennsylvania Location within the United States
- Location: S. 2nd Street between Pine and Lombard Streets. Philadelphia, Pennsylvania
- Coordinates: 39°56′35″N 75°8′43″W
- Area: 2 acres (0.81 ha)
- Built: Market: 1745; Head House: 1804
- Architectural style: Georgian
- Part of: Head House Square (ID72001158)
- NRHP reference No.: 66000686

Significant dates
- Added to NRHP: November 13, 1966
- Designated CP: June 19, 1972

New Market, as it was originally known, and later also known as Head House (or Headhouse) Market and Second Street Market, is an historic street market which is located on South 2nd Street between Pine and Lombard streets in the Queen Village neighborhood of Philadelphia, Pennsylvania. With a history dating to 1745, it is one of the oldest surviving market buildings of its type in the nation.

This portion, which survives from a longer structure originally extending all the way to South Street, was designated a National Historic Landmark in 1966, and is the centerpiece of the Head House Square historic district.

== History ==
Established on Lombard Street in 1745 by mayor Edward Shippen and Joseph Wharton, a wealthy merchant, and named "New Market" to distinguish it from the established market on High (now Market) Street, the market was used well into the 19th century.

It originally consisted of sixteen stalls created by two rows of brick pillars supporting a gable roof and arched ceiling over an open market area, known as the Shambles.

By 1797, it had extended to South Street, where it ended in a firehouse, which was later demolished, and eventually extended north to Pine Street as well.

In 1804, Joseph Wetherill, a wealthy merchant and master builder, encouraged the City of Philadelphia to erect the Head House at the north end of New Market (Second Street), for which he loaned the city $1,000.

The Head House, a Georgian-style brick firehouse with Federal-style ornamentation, was built at the north end of the market; the building's cupola once housed a firebell.

The firehouse is the oldest extant in the United States, and is now used as a community center.

The market reached its greatest extent, all the way to South Street, by 1811. The market section between Pine and Lombard underwent a major restoration in 1923, which replaced the roof and a number of brick piers. The Head House has also undergone restoration.

The site was declared a National Historic Landmark on November 13, 1966. It is a contributing property of the Head House Square National Historic District. It was restored in 1994 by the Head House Conservancy, a non-profit organization.

In 1975, a modern steel-and-glass retail and restaurant complex called NewMarket opened east of the historic market between Pine and Lombard Streets. The center struggled to attract customers and was essentially vacant by 1988. An early 1990s revival as a cabaret entertainment district was short-lived. The complex was demolished in 2002 and its site was subsequently redeveloped.

== Head House Square ==
- Head House Square
- U.S. National Register of Historic Places
- U.S. Historic district
- Location: Both sides of the 400 block of S. 2nd St., Philadelphia, Pennsylvania
- Area: 9.9 acres (4.0 ha)
- Built: 1775
- Architects: John Haviland; Van Arkel & Moss
- NRHP reference No.: 72001158
- Added to NRHP: June 19, 1972

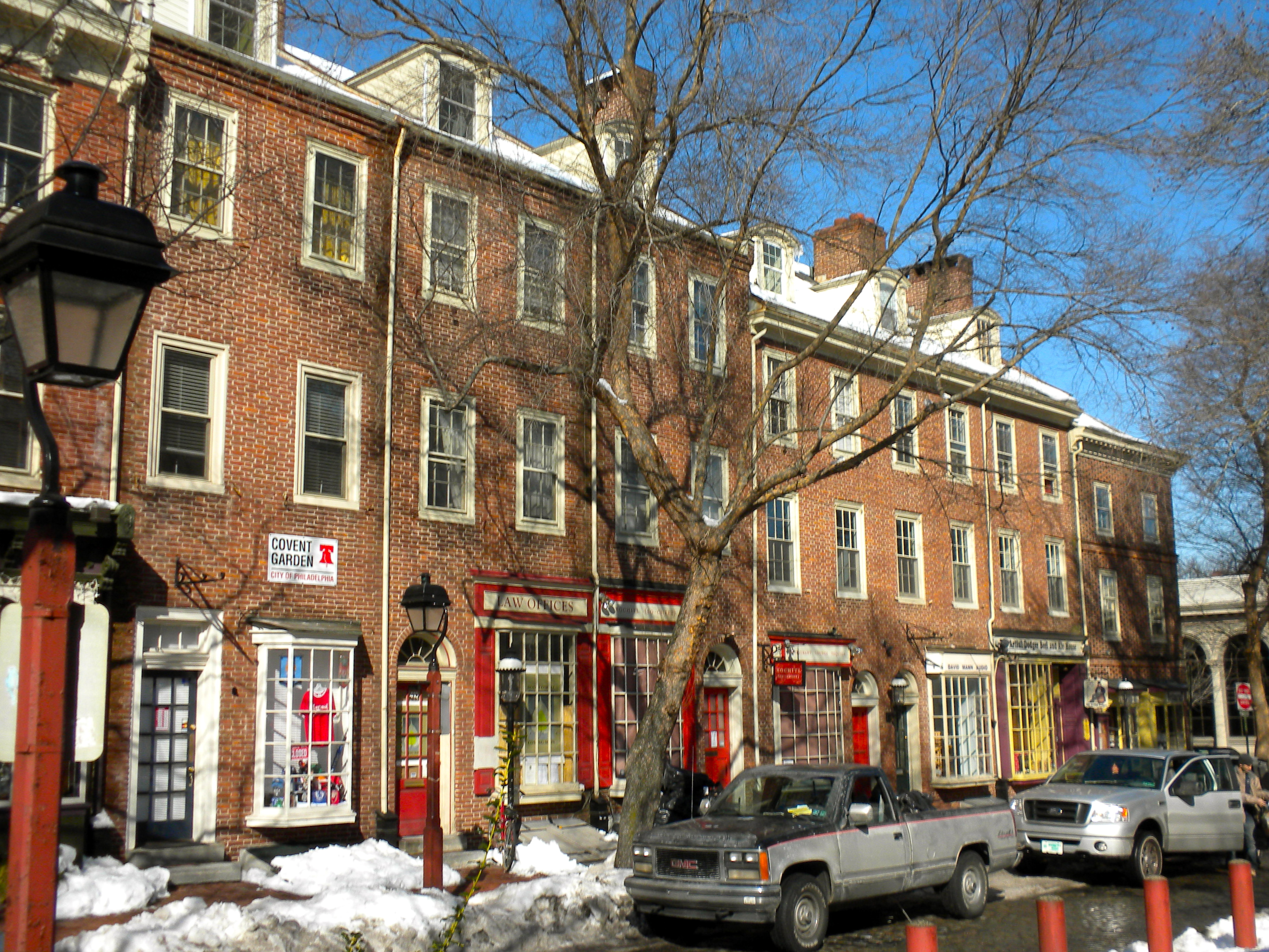
Buildings on the square

The area around the building, known as Head House Square (or Headhouse Square), features cobblestone streets and a park, as well as one of the oldest continuously run farmer's markets in the nation.

The farmer's market is open on Sundays year round, 10am - 2pm May through December and 10am-1pm January through April.

The area, which comprises twenty-two contributing properties over 9.9 acres (40,000 m^{2}), was listed on the National Register of Historic Places as a historic district in 1972.

The houses surrounding the square are from the late 18th to early 19th centuries, and the area was extensively restored in the 1950s and 1960s.

The houses have always been used both as residences and as commercial buildings. Most are typical middle class examples of their time, though the John Ross House at 401 S. 2nd was one of the largest townhouses of its day. It was visited by George Washington.

== See also ==
- List of National Historic Landmarks in Philadelphia
- National Register of Historic Places listings in Center City, Philadelphia
