= Ramcat Historic District =

Historic district in Pennsylvania, United States

- U.S. National Register of Historic Places
- U.S. Historic district
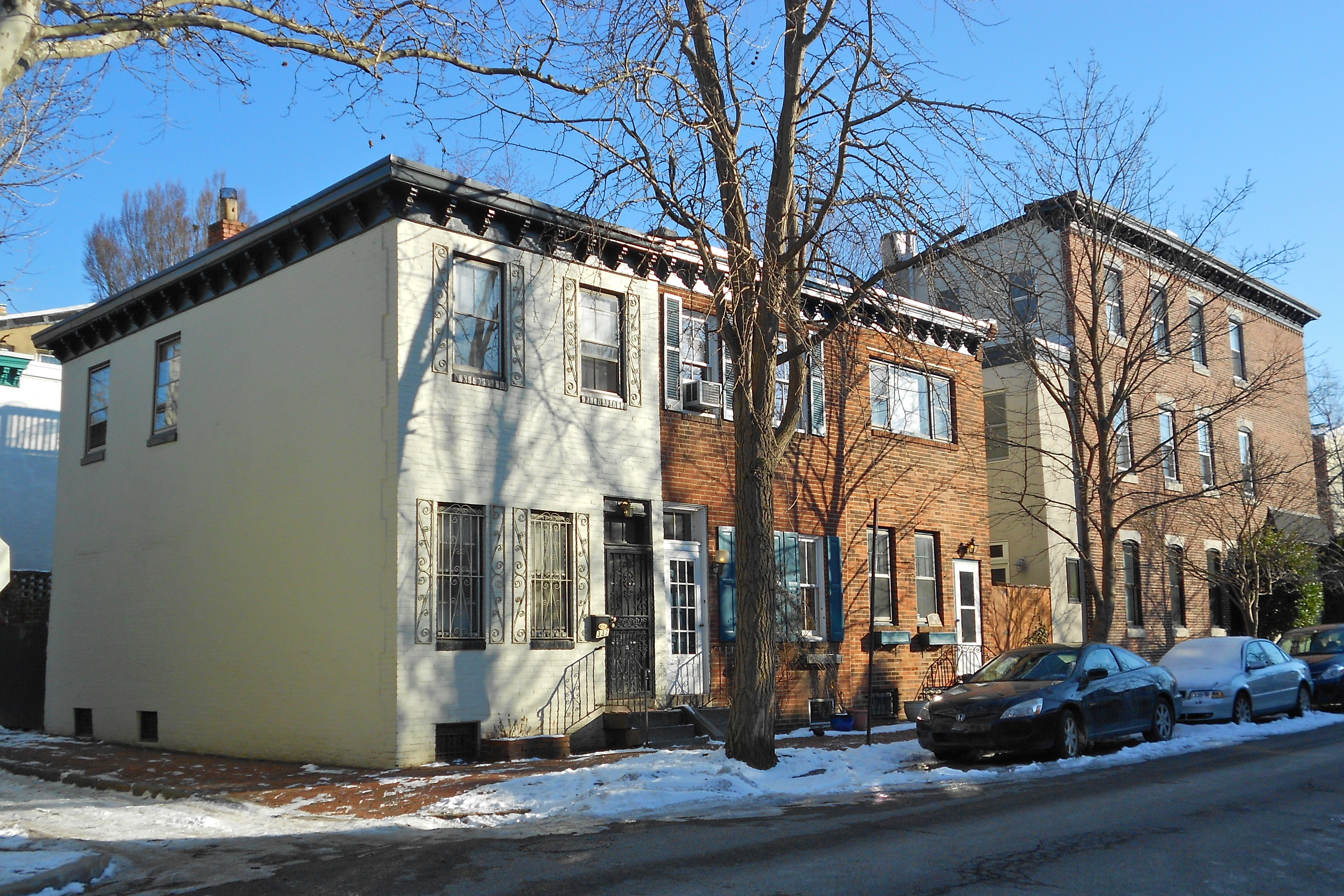
- South 25th, Ramcat Historic District, February 2014

- Location within Philadelphia Location within Pennsylvania Location within the United States
- Location: Roughly bounded by Market, Twenty-third, and Bainbridge Sts., and RR yards, Philadelphia, Pennsylvania
- Coordinates: 39°56′55″N 75°10′54″W
- Area: 48 acres (19 ha)
- Architect: Multiple
- Architectural style: Late 19th And 20th Century Revivals, Late Victorian, Federal
- NRHP reference No.: 86000055
- Added to NRHP: January 8, 1986

The Ramcat Historic District, also known as the Schuylkill Historic District, is a national historic district that is located in the Rittenhouse Square West neighborhood of Philadelphia, Pennsylvania.

It was added to the National Register of Historic Places in 1986.

== History and architectural features ==
This district encompasses 613 contributing buildings and includes a mix of transportation-related, residential, and industrial properties. The mid- to late-nineteenth-century housing stock is characterized as two-story, rowhouse dwellings for the working class. Notable non-residential buildings include the Wanamaker delivery garage, Gimbel's delivery garage, Lanston Monotype Co., Lippincott and Co. Press Building, Thornton-Fuller Auto Assembly Plant (1925), Crane Ice Cream Co. (1904, 1914), and the New York Pie Baking Co.

== Gallery ==
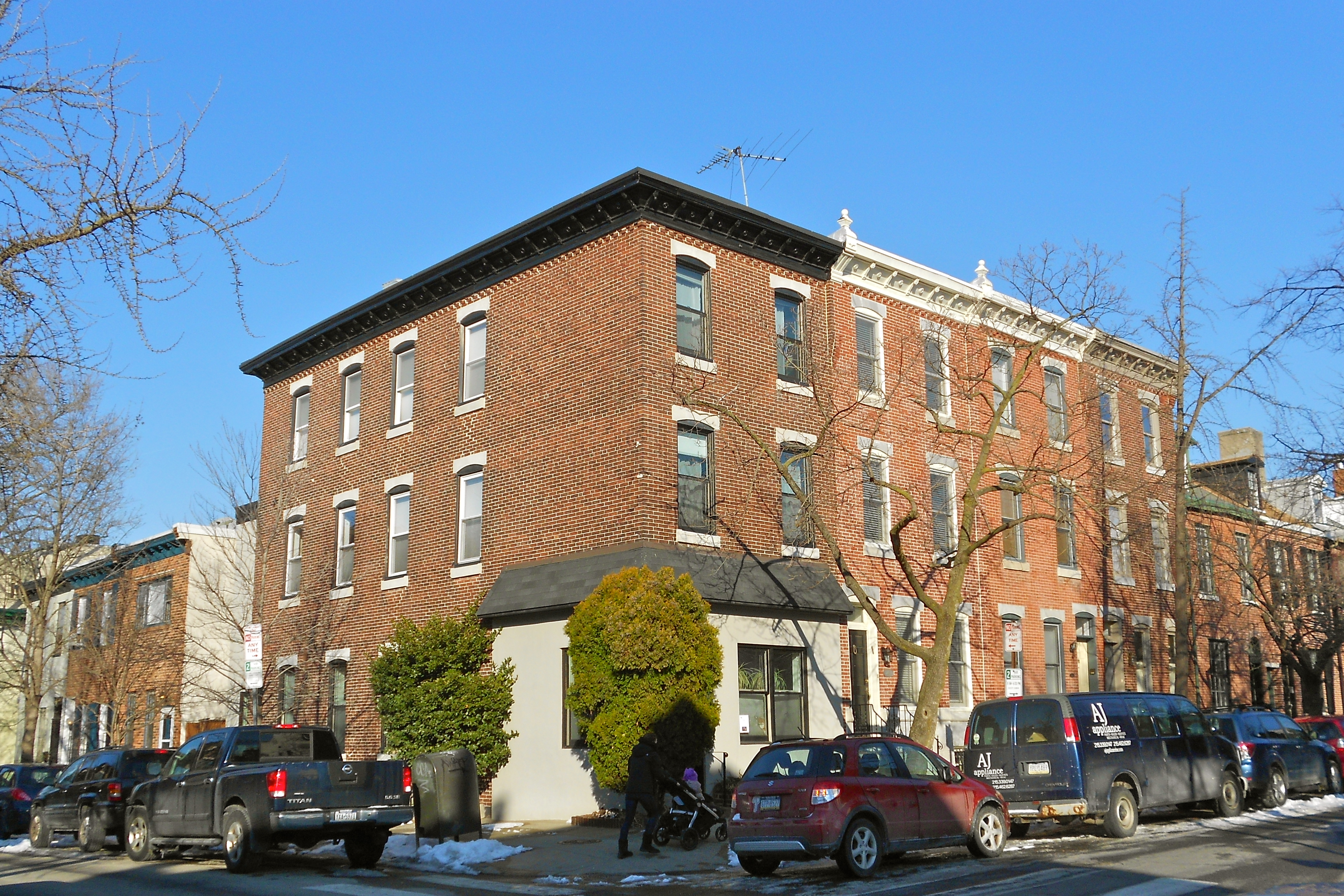
25th and Pine Streets

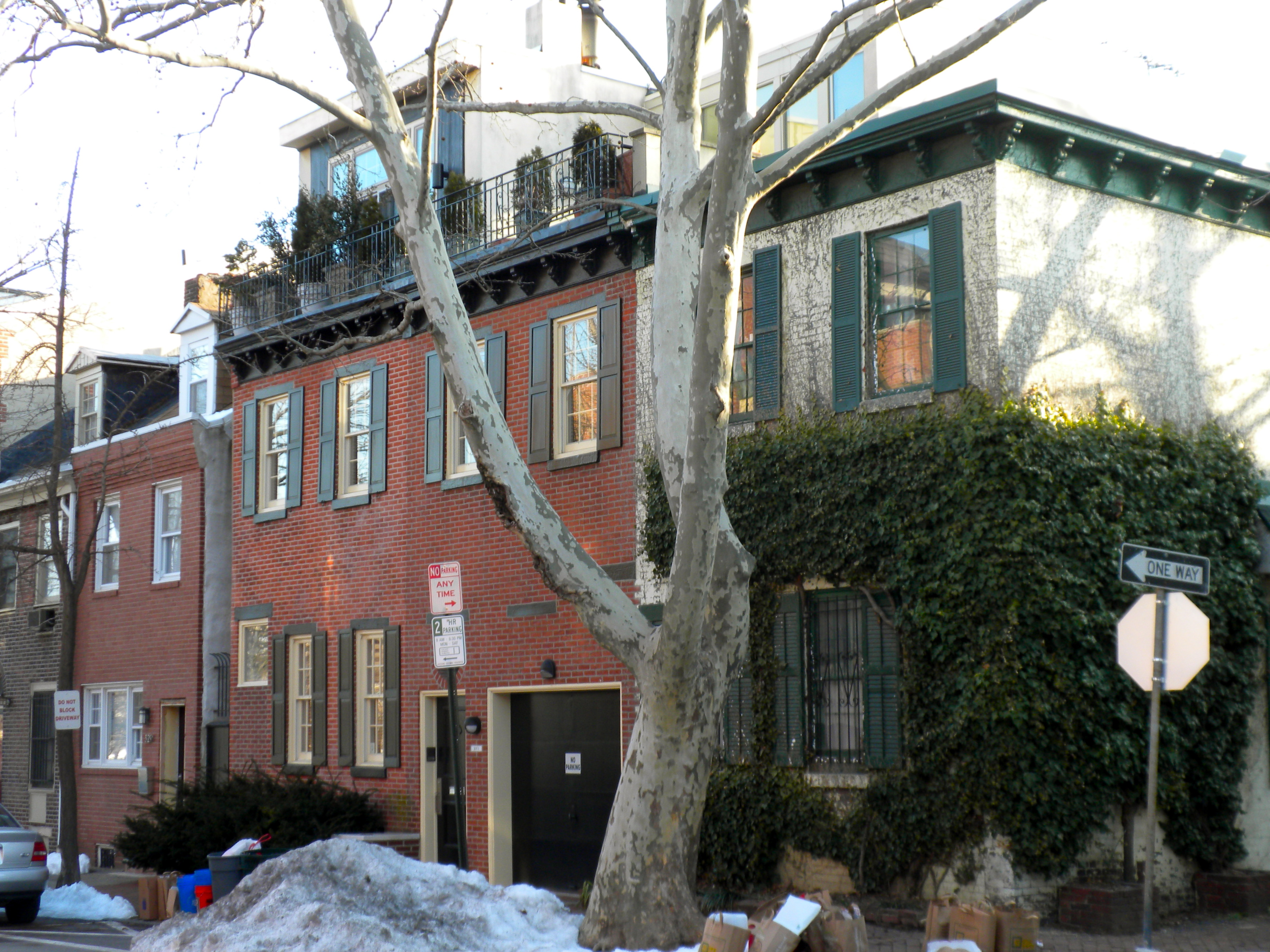
25th and Panama

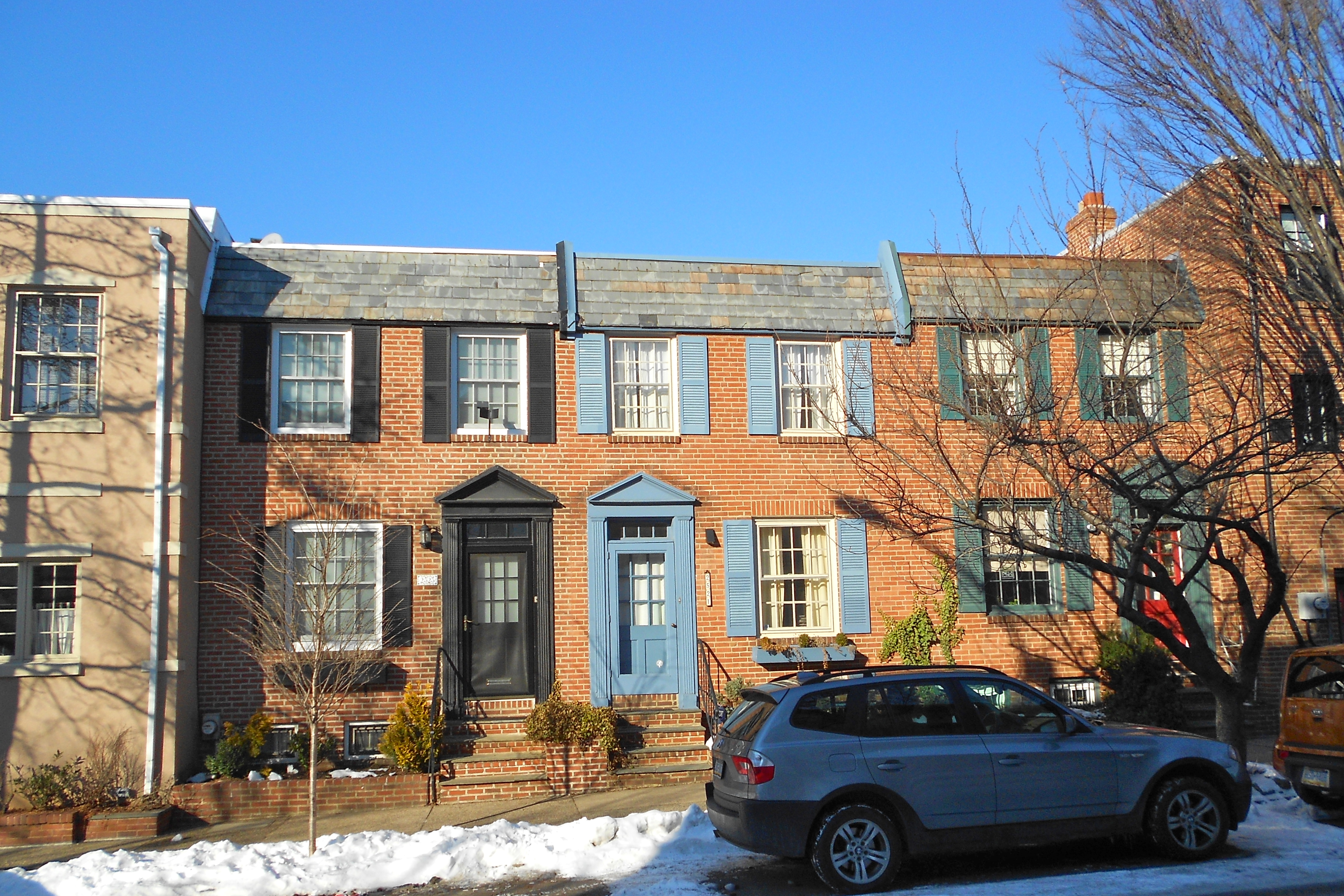
Pine Street
