= Ringgold Place =

Historic house in Pennsylvania, United States

- U.S. National Register of Historic Places
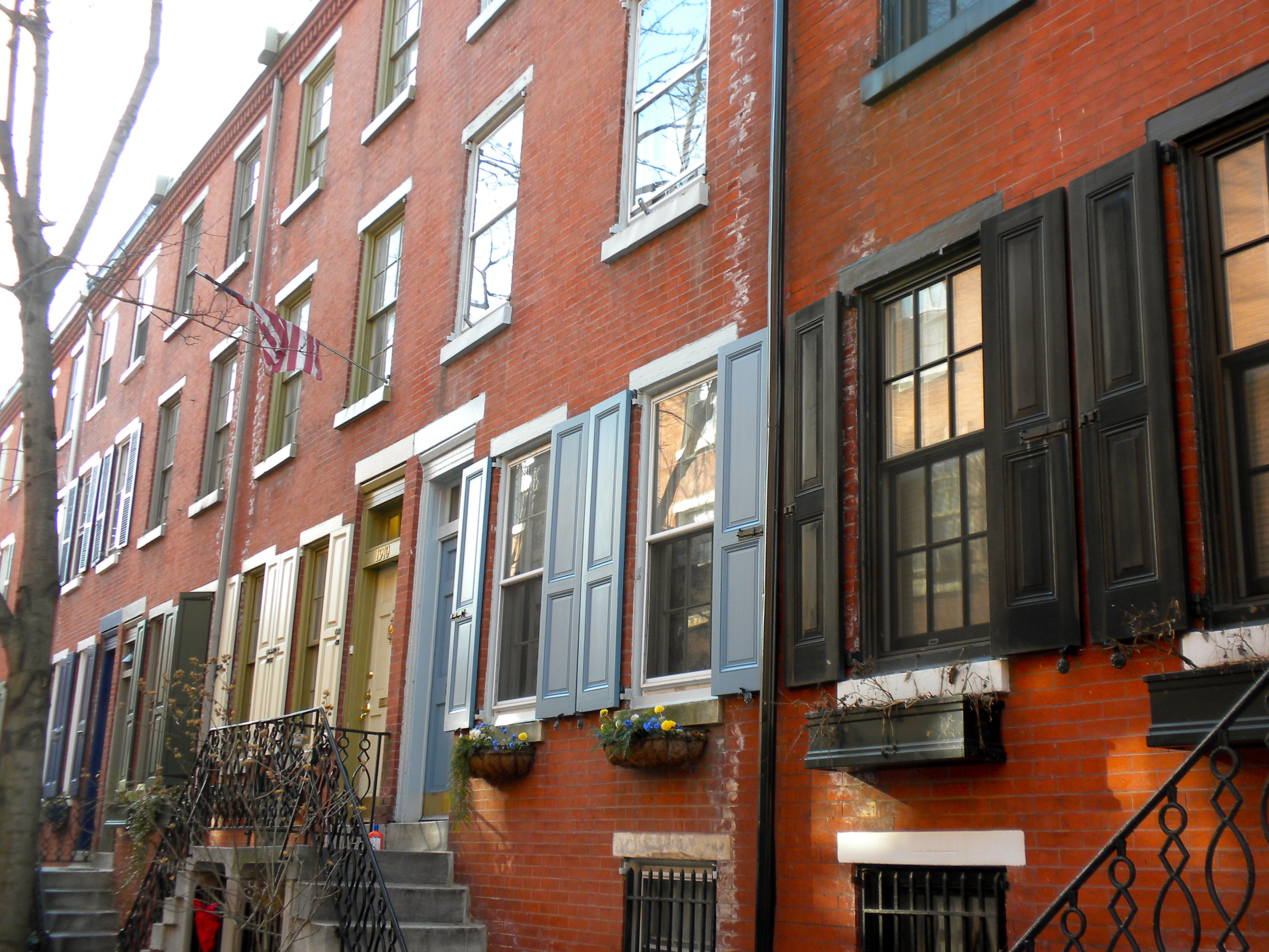
- Ringgold Place, February 2010

- Location within Philadelphia Location within Pennsylvania Location within the United States
- Location: 1900 block of Waverly Street, Philadelphia, Pennsylvania
- Coordinates: 39°56′46″N 75°10′28″W
- Area: 0.3 acres (0.12 ha)
- Built: c. 1862, 1925
- Architect: Walter C. Allison; Tilden, Register & Pepper
- NRHP reference No.: 78002453
- Added to NRHP: August 29, 1978

Ringgold Place is a set of 26 historical, American, rowhouses located in the Rittenhouse Square West neighborhood of Philadelphia, Pennsylvania.

They were added to the National Register of Historic Places in 1983.

== History and architectural features ==
These rowhouses were built circa 1862, and their scale reflects the material shortages during the American Civil War. The three-story brick residences measure fourteen feet by twenty feet, with spartan facades and interiors, and sit on raised basements.

The properties were acquired in 1925, by noted Philadelphia architect George Howe (1886–1955). His office was located at 1900 Ringgold Place and he owned the houses until 1934. He, or Tilden, Register & Pepper, a firm he employed, modernized the dwellings and introduced some decorative elements to the 19th Street facades.
