= 1900 Rittenhouse Square Apartments =

- U.S. National Register of Historic Places
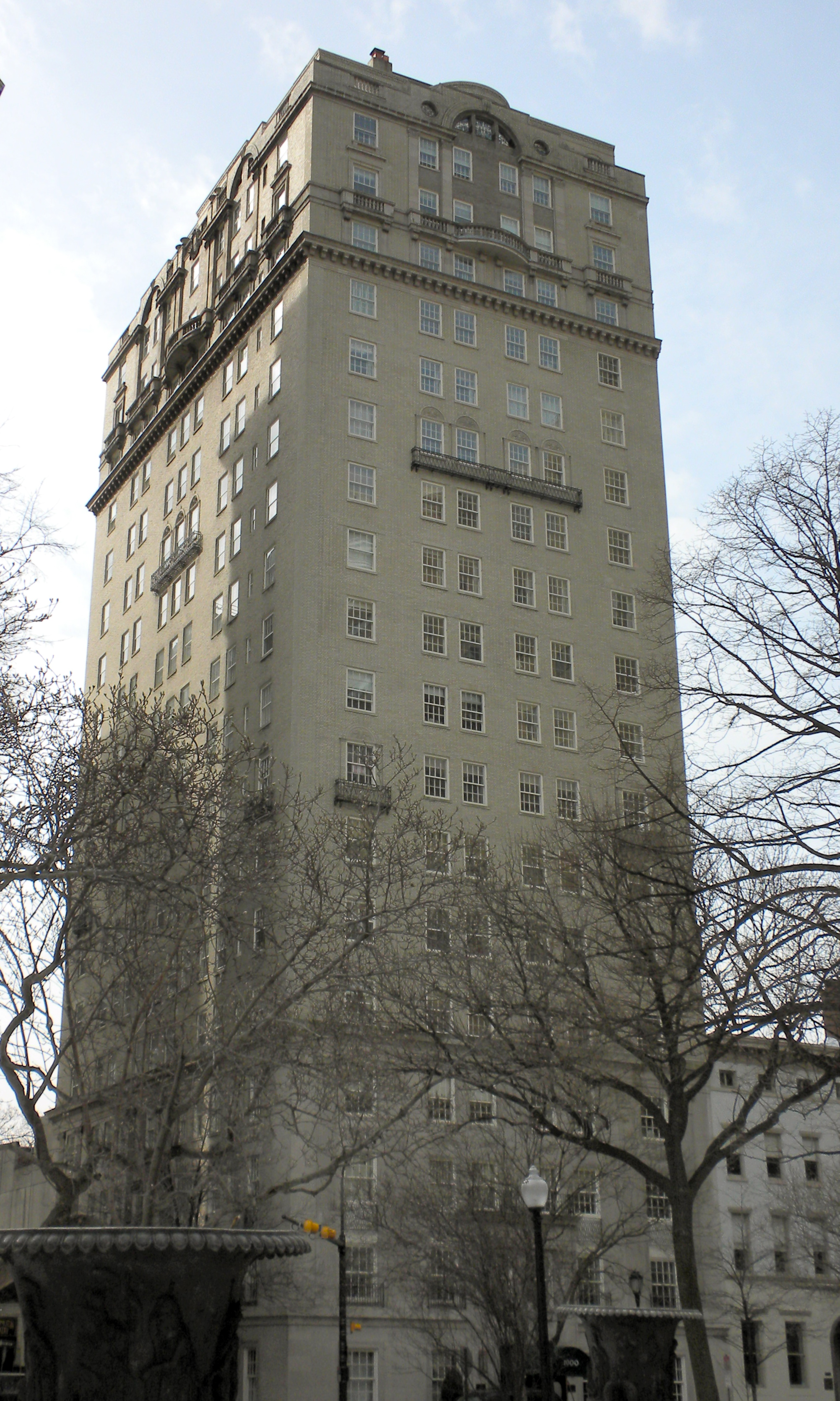
- 1900 Rittenhouse Square Apartments in February 2010

- Location within Philadelphia Location within Pennsylvania Location within the United States
- Location: 1900 S. Rittenhouse Sq., Philadelphia, Pennsylvania, U.S.
- Coordinates: 39°56′54″N 75°10′24″W
- Area: 0.1 acres (0.040 ha)
- Built: 1923–1926
- Architect: Sugarman, Hess & Berger
- Architectural style: Regency Revival
- NRHP reference No.: 82003805
- Added to NRHP: July 26, 1982

The 1900 Rittenhouse Square Apartments is a historic high-rise building on Rittenhouse Square in downtown Philadelphia, Pennsylvania. It was built 1923–1926.

The 190 foot (58 m) tall, 19-story building has been converted to condominiums.

1900 Rittenhouse Square was added to the National Register of Historic Places in 1982. It was listed on the Philadelphia Register of Historic Places on January 7, 1982, and February 8, 1995.
