= St. James Hotel (Philadelphia) =

- U.S. National Register of Historic Places
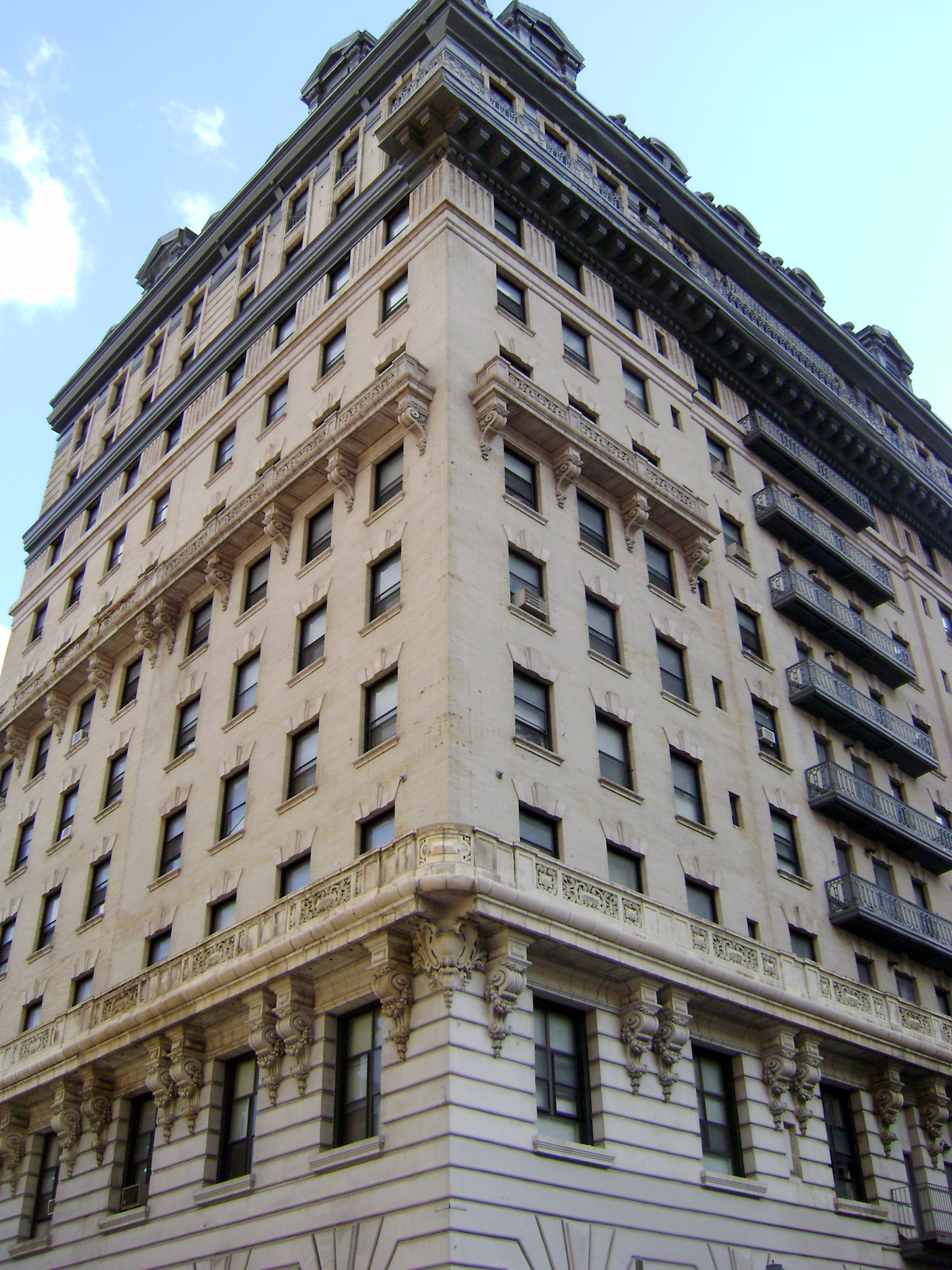
- St. James Hotel in Philadelphia in October 2009

- Location within Pennsylvania
- Location: 1226–1232 Walnut Street, Philadelphia, Pennsylvania
- Coordinates: 39°56′55″N 75°9′45″W
- Area: 8,400 square feet (780 m^{2})
- Built: 1901 & 1904
- Architect: Horace Trumbauer
- Architectural style: Eclectic
- NRHP reference No.: 76001671
- Added to NRHP: November 13, 1976

The Walnut Square Apartments is an historic, 12-story building in Center City, Philadelphia, Pennsylvania. It was designed by Horace Trumbauer and built in 1901 as the St. James Hotel, with an addition constructed in 1904.

It was listed on the National Register of Historic Places in 1976.

== See also ==
- National Register of Historic Places listings in Center City, Philadelphia
