= Girard Group =

- U.S. National Register of Historic Places
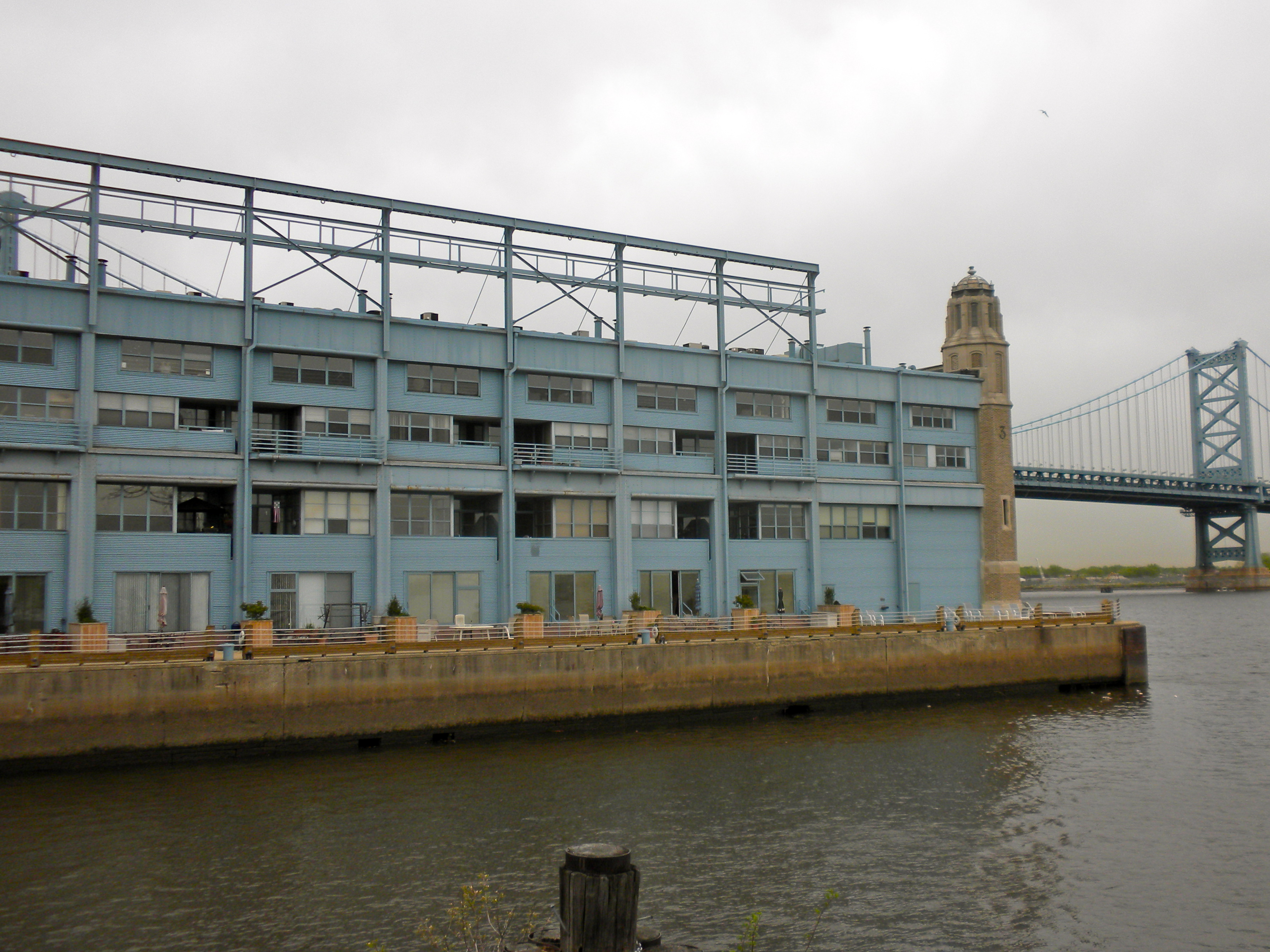

- Location within Philadelphia Location within Pennsylvania Location within the United States
- Location: Delaware Avenue and Arch Street, Philadelphia, Pennsylvania
- Coordinates: 39°57′4″N 75°8′36″W
- Area: 15.2 acres (6.2 ha)
- Built: 1923
- Architect: Havens, Fred; Sinkler, John P.
- NRHP reference No.: 83002269
- Added to NRHP: May 6, 1983

Piers 3 and 5 North known as the Girard Group on Philadelphia's Delaware River waterfront were built by the City of Philadelphia and named in honor of Stephen Girard who built wharfs in this area in the early nineteenth century. Each of the two piers contains warehouse space of about 100,000 square feet (9,300 m^{2}). The Benjamin Franklin Bridge is one block north of the northern pier.

It was listed on the National Register of Historic Places in 1983.
