= Clinton Street Historic District =

Historic district in Pennsylvania, United States

- U.S. National Register of Historic Places
- U.S. Historic district
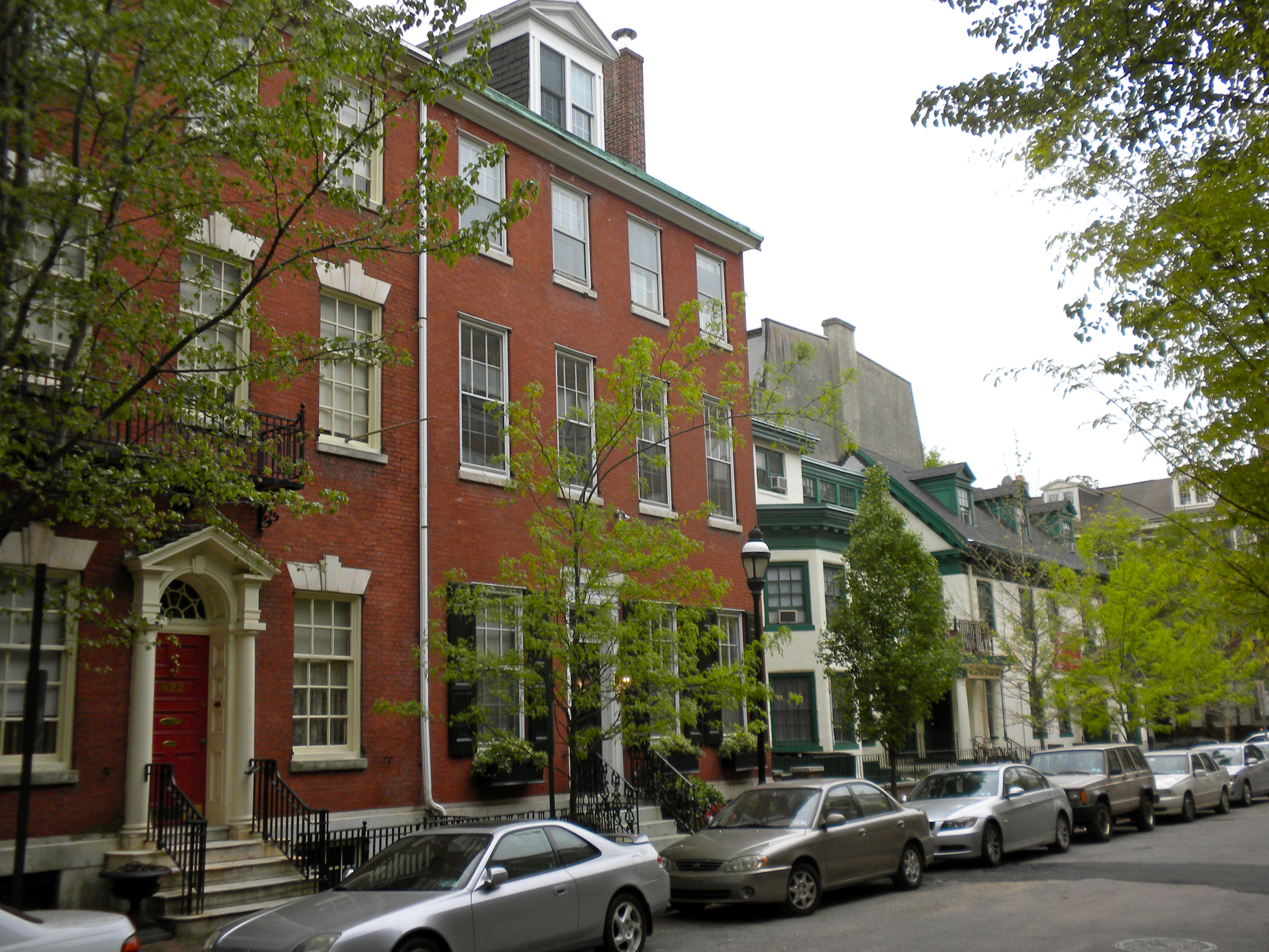
- Clinton Street Historic District, April 2010

- Location within Philadelphia Location within Pennsylvania Location within the United States
- Location: Bounded by 9th, 11th, Pine, and Cypress Sts., Philadelphia, Pennsylvania
- Coordinates: 39°56′42″N 75°9′31″W
- Area: 9.9 acres (4.0 ha)
- Built: 1835
- NRHP reference No.: 72001148
- Added to NRHP: April 26, 1972

Clinton Street Historic District is a national historic district located in the Washington Square West neighborhood of Philadelphia, Pennsylvania. It includes 71 brick rowhouses built between 1835 and 1850. They are between 3 1/2- and 4-stories and consist of the typical Philadelphia rowhouse plan with front building, piazza, and back building. It was a fashionable residential section in the 19th century and home to such notable figures as architect Addison Hutton (1834–1916), Rt. Rev. William Bacon Stevens (1815-1887), and Agnes Repplier (1855-1950). Located in the district and separately listed is the J. Peter Lesley House at 1008 Clinton Street.

It was added to the National Register of Historic Places in 1972.
