= Jayne Estate Building =

- Formerly listed on the U.S. National Register of Historic Places
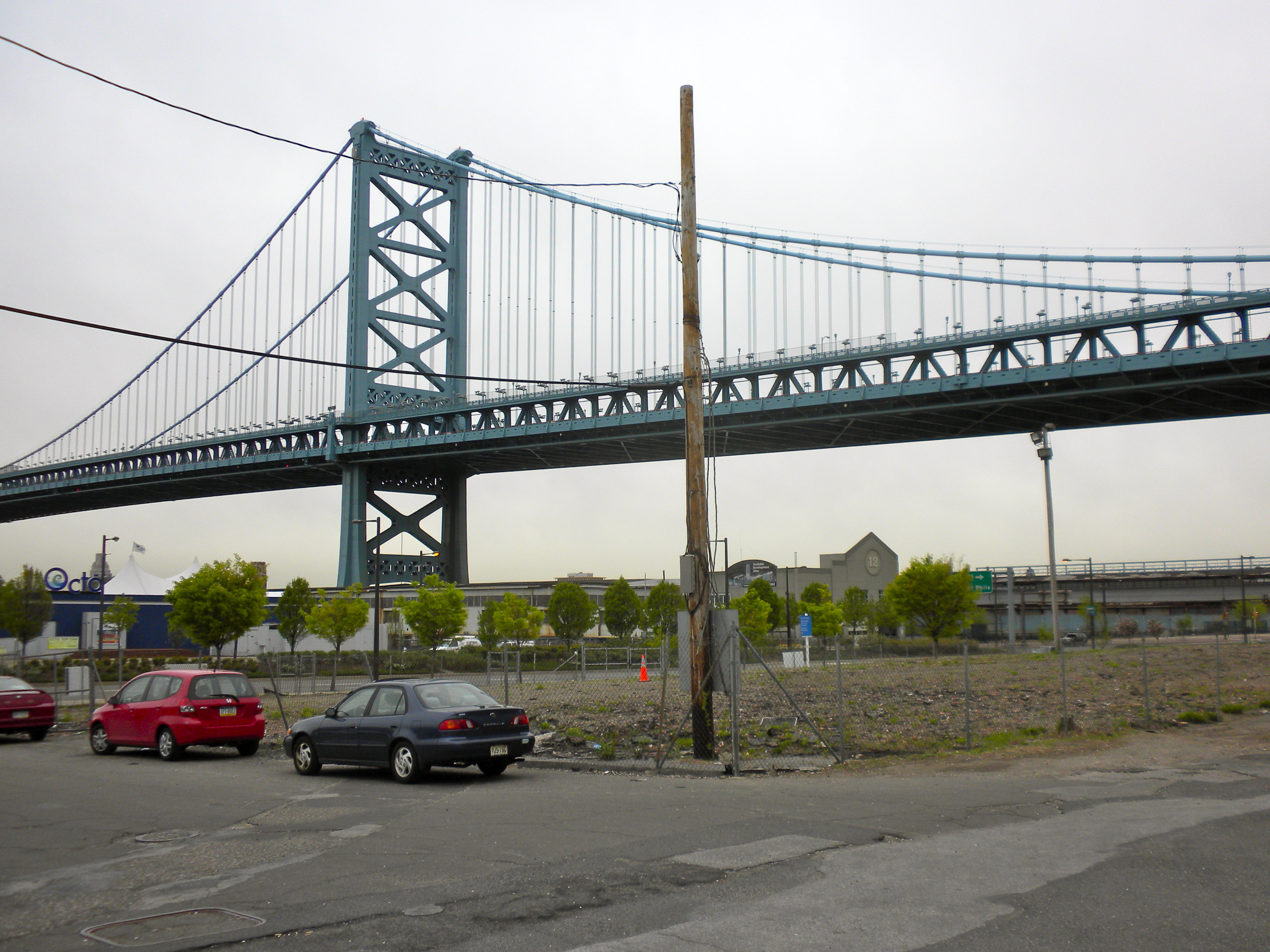
- Ben Franklin Bridge viewed from the corner of Water and Vine, Philadelphia. The lot in the foreground, at 2-16 Vine Street, Penn's Landing, was the site of the Jayne Estate Building

- Location within Philadelphia Location within Pennsylvania Location within the United States
- Location: 2–16 Vine St., Philadelphia, Pennsylvania
- Coordinates: 39°57′19″N 75°8′23″W
- Area: 0.3 acres (0.12 ha)
- Built: 1870
- Architect: John McArthur Jr.
- NRHP reference No.: 87000648

Significant dates
- Added to NRHP: April 30, 1987
- Removed from NRHP: January 18, 2011

The Jayne Estate Building, which was located near the Delaware River waterfront in Old City Philadelphia, Pennsylvania, was built in 1870 to house eight stores that were operated by the estate of Dr. David Jayne (1799-1866), who became a millionaire by selling patent medicine.

It was listed on the National Register of Historic Places in 1987., but was demolished during the 1980s and then delisted by the National Register of Historic Places on January 18, 2011.

== History and architectural features ==
The architect of this historic structure was John McArthur Jr. who is best known as the designer of Philadelphia's City Hall.

The building was listed on the National Register of Historic Places in 1987. Plans fell through that year to develop the four-story warehouse into a hotel and the property was sold at auction. The building was torn down soon afterward; the property is now the location of 1 Water St, a seventeen-story apartment building.

The Jayne Estate Building was the last example of the 19th-century commercial character of North Delaware Avenue (now, Columbus Boulevard), other such structures having been demolished due to the construction of Interstate 95 and other development.

The building was delisted by the National Register of Historic Places on January 18, 2011.
