= Physicians and Dentists Building =

- U.S. National Register of Historic Places
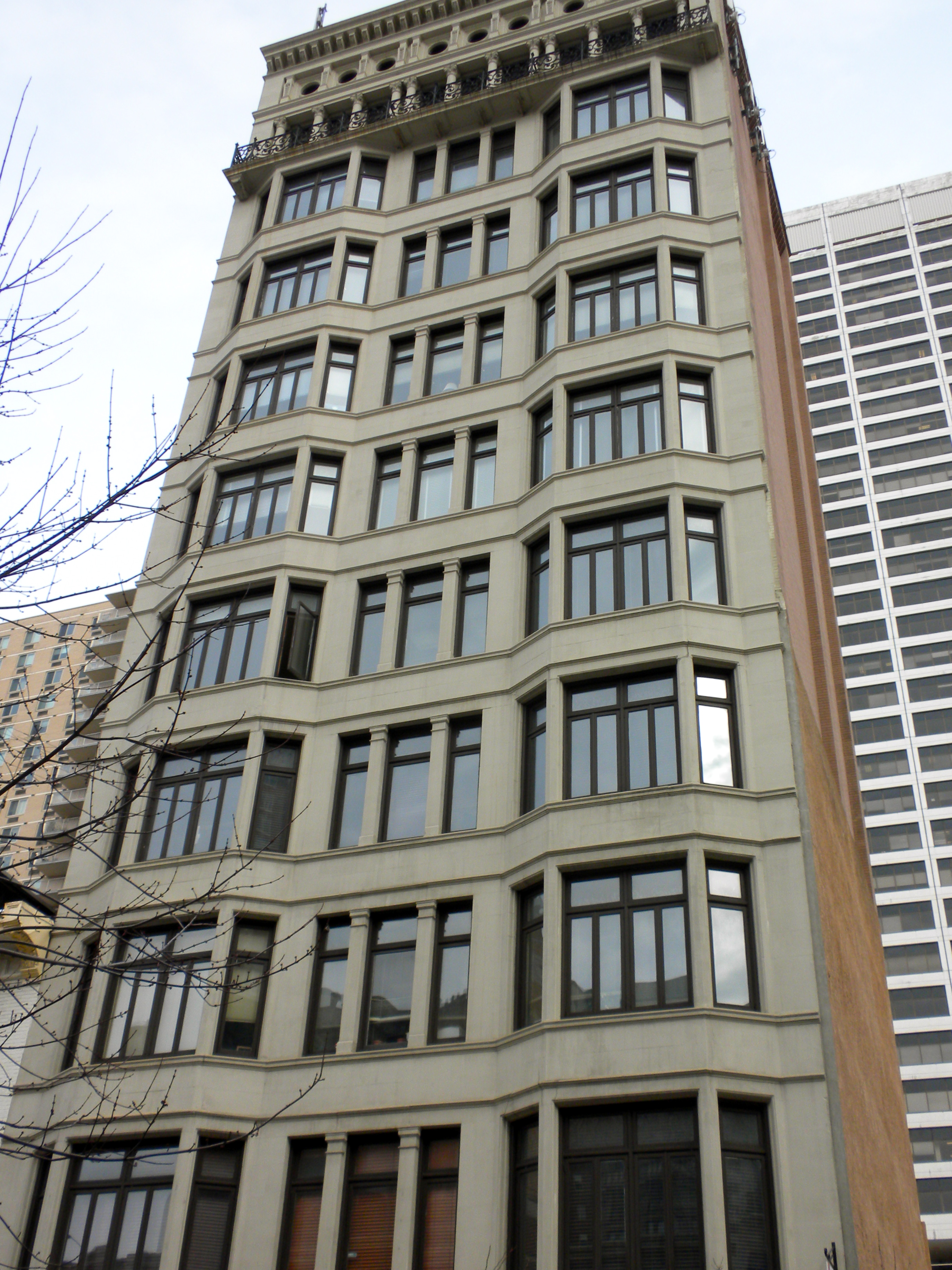
- Physicians and Dentists Building, February 2010

- Location within Philadelphia Location within Pennsylvania Location within the United States
- Location: 1831-1833 Chestnut St., Philadelphia, Pennsylvania
- Coordinates: 39°57′6″N 75°10′18″W
- Area: 0.1 acres (0.040 ha)
- Built: 1896
- Built by: Payne, George
- Architect: Wilson Brothers
- NRHP reference No.: 87001968
- Added to NRHP: November 5, 1987

The Physicians and Dentists Building, also known as the Professional Building, is an historic office building that is located in the Rittenhouse Square West neighborhood of Philadelphia, Pennsylvania, United States. It was designed by the architectural firm of Wilson Brothers & Company and built in 1896.

It was added to the National Register of Historic Places in 1987.

== History and architectural features ==
This historic structure is a ten-story building with an attic. A T-shaped steel framed building, it has a limestone-faced front facade and brick sides. It features a projecting entrance portico with Corinthian order columns and shallow projecting, three-sided bays.
