= Frederick S. Holmes =

American vault engineer and inventor (1865–1948)

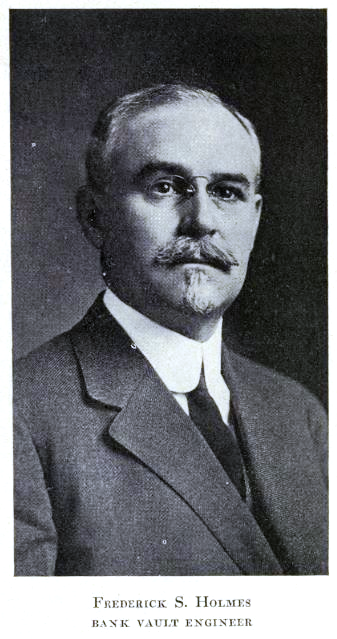
- Born: Frederick Stacy Holmes; August 27th, 1865; Exeter, NH
- Died: November 10th, 1948🪪 Hathorne, MA (Age 83); Buried in Exeter Cemetery
- Education: Boston High School (Boston, MA); Private Engineering Instruction (Exeter, NH)
- Occupation: Vault Engineer
- Known for: Pioneer in the vault engineering field; Inventor of combination viewer vaults; Designer of the world's largest vaults
- Notable work: Federal Reserve Bank of Cleveland vault; Federal Reserve Bank of New York vault; See the Notable works section
- Board member of: Investigating Committee of Architects & Engineers
- Spouse: Katherine E. Vincent; Married March 27th, 1886; Chelsea, MA
- Children: None
- Parents: George W. Holmes (father); Frances A. Stacy (mother)
- Engineering career
- Discipline: Mechanical Engineering
- Practice name: Frederick S. Holmes; 2 Rector St. New York, NY
- Employer: See the Career timeline section
- Significant design: Combination viewer vaults

Frederick S. Holmes was an American safe and vault engineer, and inventor who designed the largest vaults in the world. During his career, Holmes designed more than 200 vaults throughout the United States, Canada and Japan from 1895 to 1940, considered to be the golden age of bank vault construction. The majority of Holmes designed vaults are located in New York's Financial District; many are publicly accessible and in buildings on the National Register of Historic Places. His name is engraved on the builder's plaques, located on vault door encased jamb controls.

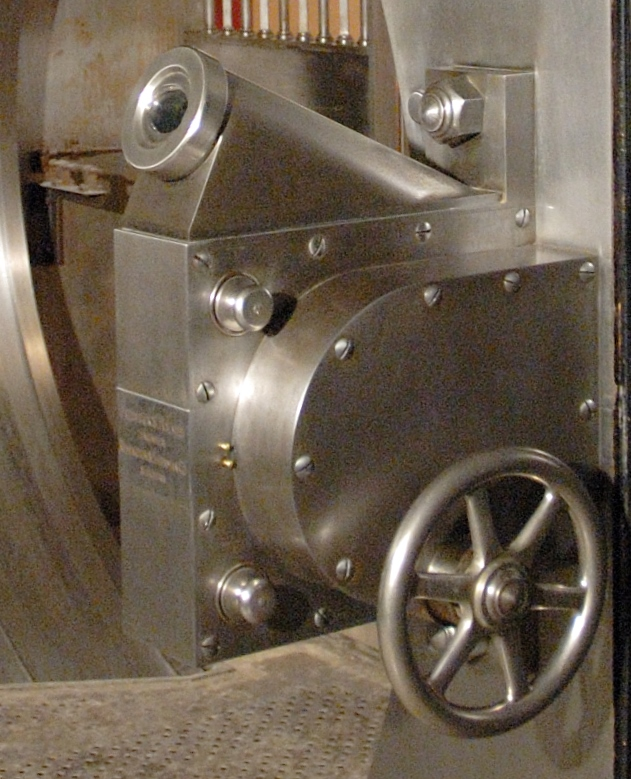
A combination viewer with pressure system, bolt-throwing hand wheel, and builder's plaque mounted on the vault door jamb, see US Patent 2,081,316. These devices were referred to as Illuminated Dial-Cases, Periscopic Sights, or Telescopic Boxes and similar in appearance to Mutoscopes which were popular around the same time.

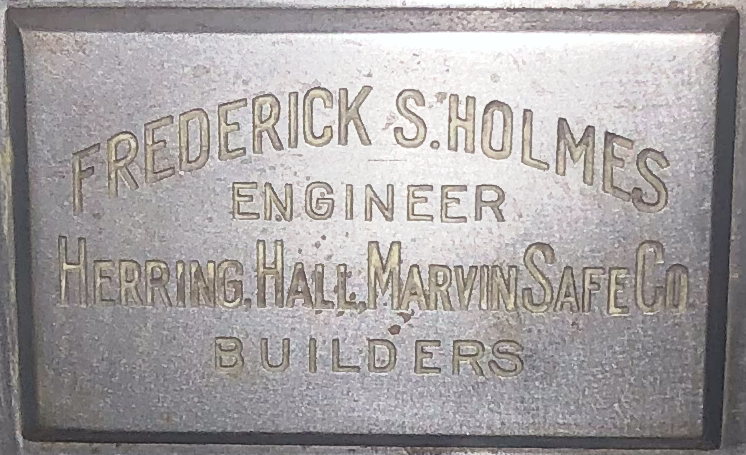
A typical builder's plaque located on vault door encased jamb controls.

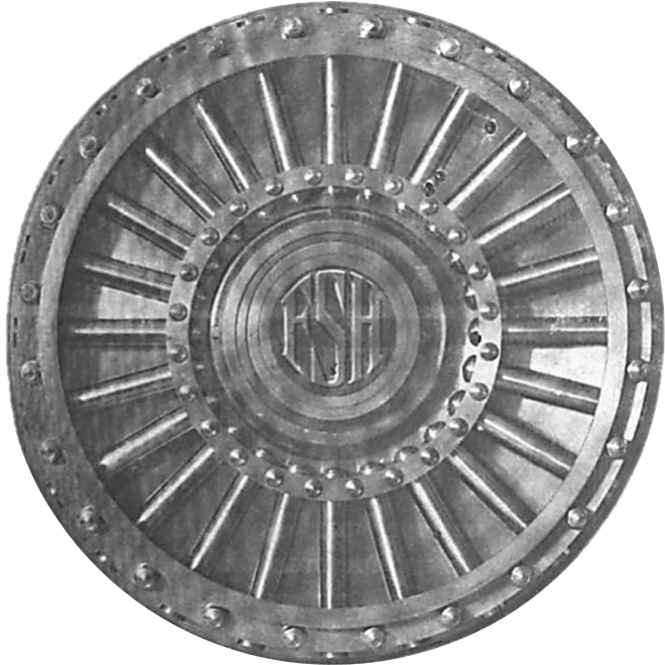
Frederick S. Holmes company logo from a 1913 advertisement.

Holmes' vault designs evolved over time to keep up with attacks from safe-crackers or 'Yeggmen' adept at vault penetration. Holmes addressed the "arms race" with burglars in an advertisement from 1921 that reads, "Newly discovered methods of attack necessitate radical departures from hitherto accepted standards of design". He also said, "Whatever a man puts together, a man can take apart if you give him enough time - it is time we are fighting for". Holmes specialized in jamb-controlled vaults where the combination locks and bolt-throwing mechanism are located inside the vault creating a solid vault door with no spindle holes. Entry requires two points of attack (door and jamb), which doubles the time required for burglars to breach the vault. The pinnacle of vault door design and security was the invention of combination viewers which were used on the largest vaults ever built.

Holmes was an expert in his field and described as 'one of the leading, if not the leading vault engineer of America, and a man whose word is unquestioned by those who have had transactions with him'. In recognition of significant contributions to the field of bank vault engineering, a tribute was written in The Journal of the Franklin Institute stating, “Coincident with the modern development of the safe and bank vault industry was that of the profession of the Bank Vault Engineer. The industry owes much of its progress to the work done by the pioneers of this profession: William H. Hollar, John M. Mossman, George L. Damon, Emil A. Strauss, Frederick S. Holmes, Benjamin F. Tripp, and George L. Remington.” Holmes worked with all these vault engineering greats except Strauss.

Holmes collaborated with prominent architects such as Alfed Bossom, Cass Gilbert, Darling, Pearson & Cleveland, Walker & Weeks, and York & Sawyer. He also worked with leading vault builders including Bethlehem Steel, Carnegie Steel, Damon Safe & Iron Works, Diebold, Herring-Hall-Marvin, J&J Taylor, LH Miller Safe & Iron Works, Mosler Safe, Remington & Sherman, Stiffel & Freeman, and York Safe & Lock.

== Early life ==
Frederick Stacy Holmes was born on August 27, 1865 in Exeter, NH to George W. Holmes and Frances A. Stacy. His father was from Maine and worked as a Pattern Maker and his mother was from New Hampshire and was a housewife. Holmes attended Boston High School and received private engineering instruction in New Hampshire.

== Career ==
Homes first worked as a Pattern Maker like his father, a Machinist and then a Mechanical Draftsman. He worked his way up to General Superintendent for safe and vault manufacturers in Chicago, Boston, and Philadelphia before venturing out on his own. Holmes was co-owner of Hoyer & Holmes with Isaiah Wellington Hoyer in Philadelphia that specialized in safe and vault design and construction. He worked as a Bank Vault Engineer for John M. Mossman where he designed the Maiden Lane Safe Deposit Company vault among others. Afterwards, he started the Frederick S. Holmes company and by 1910 was designing the jamb-controlled vaults for which he was known. Holmes was a member of many Investigating Committees of Architects and Engineers which were multidisciplinary review boards assembled to study a building, project, or failure, combining architectural judgment with engineering analysis. He was in private practice for 35 years where he designed his most notable vaults.

=== Career timeline ===
See patent summaries in the Published works section. Click the [show] link below for details.

Year (Age)	Position / Company	Patent Number and Name with Short Description (Year / Location)
1879 to 1883 (14 to 18)	Pattern Maker and Machinist (company unknown, possibly working with his father) while attending Boston High School in Boston, MA	
1883 to 1887 (18 to 22)	Mechanical Draftsman (company unknown) while receiving private engineering instruction in Exeter, NH	
1887 to 1893 (22 to 28)	General Superintendent of safe and vault manufacturing at: Damon Safe & Iron Works in Boston, MA and Philadelphia, PA (bank locks, express boxes/chests, safes, and vaults); Chicago Safe & Lock in Chicago, IL (safes, combination/time locks, and vaults)	438,236 Electric Safe-Lock - Improvements (1890 / Malden, MA); 459,226 Safe or Vault - Copper Rabbet Packing (1891 / Philadelphia, PA); 467,465 Electric Lock - Improvements (1892 / Boston, MA); 477,897 Electric Lock - Improvements (1892 / Malden, MA); 477,898 Electric Lock - Improvements (1892 / Malden, MA)
1893 to 1901 (28 to 36)	Co-Owner / Bank Vault Engineer at Hoyer & Holmes, a partnership with Isaiah Wellington Hoyer in Philadelphia, PA - services included architecture, safe and bank vault construction and superintendence, bank lock inspection and guaranteeing, engineering consulting, metallic fittings, and structural iron work.	557,389 Removable Sill for Vaults or Safes (1896 / Philadelphia, PA); 620,073 Safe - Protection from Electric Arc Attacks (1899 / Philadelphia, PA)
1901 to 1905 (36 to 40)	Designer at the J. M. Mossman Co. in New York, NY - services included designing and superintending of safe and vault construction, sale and repair of express boxes, money chests, safes, time locks and time lock guaranteeing.	
1905 to 1940 (40 to 75)	Owner / Bank Vault Engineer at Frederick. S. Holmes, a private practice in New York, NY. Bank Vault Engineer was his most commonly used title, but similar combinations were used in his published works and advertisements.: 1911 - Engineer and Superintendent for construction of the Bureau of Engraving & Printing's Money, Stamp, and Plate vaults of the US Treasury.; 1936 - Bank Vault Engineer for the Architecture division of New York State's Department of Public Works.	901,710 Movable Ventilator for Vaults (1908 / New York, NY); 2,081,316 Vault - Cylindrical with Combination Viewers (1937 / York, PA)

== Notable works ==
This list contains all 33 known combination viewer vault locations: 26 in the USA, six in Canada, and one in Japan. Two undisclosed locations, one unknown location and Holmes' earlier vault designs (pre-combination viewer) are not included. The list is sorted by the Location Name (original) column. Click the [show] link below for details.

Location Name (original)	Map	City	State/ Province	Year	Vault Builder	Building Architect
Aetna Life Insurance Co.	click for location map	Hartford	CT	1931		James Rogers
Bank of Japan	click for location map	Tokyo	Kanto	1932	York Safe & Lock Co.	Uheiji Nagano
Bank of Montreal	click for location map	Toronto	ON	1939		Chapman & Oxley
Canada Life Assurance Co.	click for location map	Toronto	ON	1931	J&J Taylor Ltd.	Sproatt & Rolph
Canadian Bank of Commerce (Commerce Court North)	click for location map	Toronto	ON	1931	J&J Taylor Ltd.	York & Sawyer
Central Savings Bank	click for location map	New York	NY	1928	Mosler Safe Co.	York & Sawyer
Central Trust Co. 🎞️	click for location map	Cincinnati	OH	1913	Herring, Hall, Marvin Safe Co.	Cass Gilbert
Dominion Bank (safe deposit, upper vault) 🎞️ Dominion Bank (treasury, lower vault)	click for location map	Toronto	ON	1914	Remington & Sherman Co.	Darling & Pearson
Equitable Life Assurance Society (building 11)	click for location map	New York	NY	1923	Remington & Sherman Co.	Starrett & van Vleck
Federal Reserve Bank of Cleveland 🔓 Vault opening procedure 🔒 Vault closing procedure	click for location map	Cleveland	OH	1923	York Safe & Lock Co.	Walker & Weeks
Federal Reserve Bank of Cleveland (Cincinnati branch)	click for location map	Cincinnati	OH	1927	York Safe & Lock Co.	Harry Hake
Federal Reserve Bank of Cleveland (Pittsburgh branch)	click for location map	Pittsburgh	PA	1931	York Safe & Lock Co.	Walker & Weeks
Federal Reserve Bank of Minneapolis	click for location map	Minneapolis	MN	1915	York Safe & Lock Co.	Cass Gilbert
Federal Reserve Bank of New York (current location, cylindrical vault door) 🎞️	click for location map	New York	NY	1924	York Safe & Lock Co.	York & Sawyer
Federal Reserve Bank of New York (original location)	click for location map	New York	NY	1915	York Safe & Lock Co.	Ernest Graham
Federal Reserve Bank of Philadelphia	click for location map	Philadelphia	PA	1921	York Safe & Lock Co.	Baily & Basset
Federal Reserve Bank of Philadelphia (cylindrical vault door)	click for location map	Philadelphia	PA	1935	York Safe & Lock Co.	Paul Cret
First National Bank (Boston, MA)	click for location map	Boston	MA	1923	Mosler Safe Co.	York & Sawyer
First National Bank (Jersey City, NJ)	click for location map	Jersey City	NJ	1920	York Safe & Lock Co.	Alfred Bossom
Guaranty Safe Deposit Co.	click for location map	New York	NY	1916	York Safe & Lock Co.	York & Sawyer
Industrial Trust Co. (the "Superman Building") 📷	click for location map	Providence	RI	1917	Remington & Sherman Co.	Walker & Gillette
JP Morgan & Co. 🎞️	click for location map	New York	NY	1913	Carnegie Steel Co.	Trowbridge & Livingston
Lincoln Safe Deposit Co. (original vault doors) 📷	click for location map	New York	NY	1927	York Safe & Lock Co.	William Gompert
Massachusetts Mutual Life Insurance Co. 📷	click for location map	Springfield	MA	1927	Remington & Sherman Co.	Kirkham & Parlett
Metropolitan Life Insurance Co.	click for location map	New York	NY	1925	Diebold Safe & Lock Co.	Everett Waid
National Commercial Bank	click for location map	Albany	NY	1912	Remington & Sherman Co.	York & Sawyer
Old Colony Trust Co. (Court Street, main office)	click for location map	Boston	MA	1924	Remington & Sherman Co.	Shepley, Rutan & Coolidge
Old Colony Trust Co. (Temple Place, branch) 📷	click for location map	Boston	MA	1921	Herring, Hall, Marvin Safe Co.	Shepley, Rutan & Coolidge
Pennsylvania Co. for Insurances on Lives & Granting Annuities 📷	click for location map	Philadelphia	PA	1922		Ritter & Shay
Pennsylvania Treasury (finance building, cylindrical vault door) 🎞️	click for location map	Harrisburg	PA	1939	York Safe & Lock Co.	Joseph Huston
Provident Mutual Life Insurance Co.	click for location map	Philadelphia	PA	1927		Cram & Ferguson
Rhode Island Hospital Trust Co.	click for location map	Providence	RI	1917	York Safe & Lock Co.	York & Sawyer
Royal Bank of Canada	click for location map	Montreal	QC	1928	York Safe & Lock Co.	York & Sawyer
Sun Life Assurance Co.	click for location map	Montreal	QC	1913	York Safe & Lock Co.	Darling, Pearson & Cleveland

== Published works ==
This list includes articles, books, court testimony, interviews, patents, and speeches by or involving Frederick S. Holmes, grouped by year. Click [show] to expand the table.

Year	Item	Description
1890	Patent	438,236 Electric Safe-Lock (with William H. Hollar) Summary: It combines: a controller outside the safe; a pole changer for reversing current; a dial, pointer, and circuit breaker; an electromagnetic tumbler mechanism inside the safe; an auxiliary magnet or mechanical device controlling the bolts; and; a commutator permitting several safes to be selected and operated individually or simultaneously.; Figure 1 - Front elevation of the electric-controlling apparatus Figure 2 - Plan view of the electric-controlling apparatus
1891	Patent	459,226 Safe or Vault (patent witness for William H. Hollar) Summary: The invention substitutes soft-metal packing, preferably pure copper, for rubber or felt packing around a safe or vault door. The metal is compressed or "swaged" by the closing door to create a permanent close-fitting joint intended to prevent the introduction of explosives. Figure 1 - Front elevation of the vault doorway with the door removed Figure 2 - Horizontal section with the door closed Figures 3, 4, and 5 - Horizontal sections of the jamb and part of the door with the packing in different forms
1892	Patent	467,465 Electric Lock (assignor to James W. Torrey) Summary: The design adds: an electric motor to drive the external circuit breaker and pointer; gearing between the motor, pointer, and circuit breaker; push-button right-and-left operation; an electromagnetic brake for the transmitter motor; paired ratchet wheels with oppositely inclined teeth; pallet bars carrying fixed and movable pawls; a spring-loaded brake shoe holding the tumblers between impulses; movable contact-brush supports that can disengage from the tumblers; a more elaborate bolt-control linkage; and; alternative series and multiple-arc circuit arrangements.; Figure 1 - Front elevation of the electrically-controlled lock with face-plate removed and connected to the bolt-operating mechanism Figure 2 - Elevation of the ratchet-wheel and pawl Figure 3 - Right side elevation of the pawl Figures 4 and 5 - Reference details
1892	Patent	477,897 Electric Lock (with William H. Hollar) Summary: Its principal elements are: a motor or clockwork mechanism; a rotating circuit-breaker or commutator wheel; a graduated dial and pointer; a reversing mechanism; a pole changer synchronized with that reversing mechanism; manual controls for starting, stopping, and reversing operation; and; a selector that routes current to different safe circuits.; Figure 1 - Front elevation of the electric-controlling apparatus Figure 2 - Plan view of the electric-controlling apparatus
1892	Patent	477,898 Electric Lock (with William H. Hollar) Summary: It concentrates on: a series of loosely connected combination tumblers; one ratchet wheel controlling the tumblers; a polarized electromagnet and armature; pawls that step the ratchet wheel in opposite directions; electrically conductive tumbler sections and contact brushes; an auxiliary electromagnet that releases the bolt obstruction; and; an alternative mechanical gate that falls into aligned tumbler notches.; Figure 1 - Side elevation of the electrically-actuated combination-lock Figure 2 - Front right view of the combination-lock Figure 3 - Circuit diagram Figures 4 and 5 - Reference details
1896	Patent	557,389 Removable Sill for Vaults or Safes (assignor to George S. Clark) Summary: It is a retract-then-hinge sill, combining horizontal disengagement, pivotal lowering, bracing, and counterbalancing into one vault-door threshold system. Figure 1 - Vertical section of the lower part of the vault behind the outer door-sill
1899	Patent	620,073 Safe (assignor to William H. Hollar) Summary: A burglar-resistant safe and vault construction intended to resist attacks using an electric arc. The design used electrically isolated metal plates, drill-resistant components embedded in insulating material, and insulated tie bolts to prevent electrical conduction between the plates. Figure 1 - Horizontal section of a portion of the vault Figure 2 - Sectional detail view of a portion of the structure Figures 3 and 4 - Detail views of two forms of insulated tie bolts
1905	Article	The Design and Construction of Modern Bank Vaults
1908	Patent	901,710 Movable Ventilator for Vaults (with George L. Damon) Summary: A movable vault-ventilation duct that bridges the doorway/vestibule while the vault is open, but can be moved out of the way so the vault doors can close. Figure 2 - Horizontal section of the vestibule and a portion of the vault with the ventilator shown in plan
1910	Court Testimony	Mosler Safe Co. vs. Maiden Lane Safe Deposit Co. (trial witness). Summary: Holmes was involved in reviewing vault drawings, participated in revisions to mechanical details, and appears in the drawing/approval process.
1911	Articles	Vault Building - The Backward State of the Art, the Reason and the Remedy; Vault Building Problems (with portrait photograph at 46 years old); Why Insure Against Anything that Never Happens?
1912	Articles and Interview	A Renaissance of Vault Design; Uncle Sam to Build the World's Largest Treasure Vault; World’s Largest Treasure Vault (P. Harvey Middleton interview)
1913	Articles	Burglary Made Easy; Impregnable Safes (original Spanish version and English translation); That $70,000 New York Bank Vault Robbery (with a portrait photograph at 46 year old); Vault For Treasure; Vaults - A Criticism
1916	Articles and Speech	Modern Practice in the Design of Bank Vaults Part 1 - Protective Principles and Construction Methods; Modern Practice in the Design of Bank Vaults Part 2 - The Requirements of Small Banks; New Vault Construction to Resist the Cutter-Burner (New York State Safe Deposit Association convention speech); Reliability in Vaults and Safes; The Construction of Bank Vaults (a synopsis of Modern Practice in the Design of Bank Vaults, parts 1 and 2, listed above)
1917	Articles	A New Concrete for Bank Vaults (describes Holmes' testing methods); The Oxy-Acetylene Cutting Torch; Thoughts as to Erection, Arrangement and Fitting Up of a Safe Deposit Vault
1921	Articles	Bank Vaults and Fixtures (Holmes' combination viewer vault description); Vault Construction for Small Communities
1923	Articles	Harris, Forbes & Company's New Vault; Protecting Our Great Banks (by Edward H. Smith with Holmes contributions); The World's Greatest Bank Vaults (by Edward H. Smith with Holmes contributions); Vault Protection
1924	Articles	The Romance of the Lock (by Edward H. Smith with Holmes contributions); Safeguards that are Required Against the Modern Yegg; Vault Weaknesses that must be Overcome
1925	Articles	There Are No "Jimmy Valentines"; New York Savings Bank Problems - Safety Deposit Vaults for All
1926	Book	Frederick S. Holmes, Bank Vault Engineer. by Ralph M. Hooker (Investigating Committee of Architects & Engineers)
1927	Article	Guarding America's Wealth - A Renaissance of Bank Burglary
1928	Article	Bank Vault Construction and Equipment
1928	Book	The Lure of The Lock - A short treatise on locks to elucidate the John M. Mossman Collection of locks in the Museum of the General Society of Mechanics and Tradesmen in the City of New York, including some of the 'Mossman Papers' with 500 illustrations. by Albert A. Hopkins (includes the abridged article Bank Vault Construction and Equipment)
1937	Patent	2,081,316 Vault by William E. Wilkinson (assignor to the York Safe & Lock Co.); Holmes was the consultant on this pioneer patent. Summary: A revolving cylindrical vault door using eccentric curved mating surfaces so that rotation itself wedges the door tightly against the frame when closing and releases it when opening, without requiring vertical movement. The patent was used for the vault doors at the Federal Reserve Bank of Philadelphia (1935) and the Pennsylvania Treasury (1939) which describe combination viewers in detail. Only 10 cylindrical vaults are known to exist: six at the Federal Reserve Bank of New York, two at the Pennsylvania Treasury and two (main and emergency) at the Federal Reserve Bank of Philadelphia. Figure 21 - Vertical longitudinal section of the locking mechanism for the closure member Figure 22 - Front elevation of the hand wheel and parts of the locking mechanism Figure 23 - Horizontal section of the hand wheel and parts of the locking mechanism Figure 24 - Horizontal section of the locking bolts at the rear of the closure member
2005	Book	Monuments to Money: The Architecture of American Banks. by Charles Belfoure with Holmes article excerpts

== Personal life ==
Frederick S. Holmes married Katherine E. Vincent from New Hampshire on March 27, 1886 in Chelsea, MA. He was involved with industry groups such as the American Society of Mechanical Engineers (1913-1930), the Bankers Club (1920-1930), the Investigating Committee of Architects & Engineers (1926), the Engineers’ Club (1920-1930), the Hardware Club of New York (1914), and the New York State Society of Professional Engineers (1936). Holmes had an active social life with membership in the American Club in Toronto (1920), the Brotherhood of Man (1924), the New York Athletic Club (1914-1941), and the Saint Nicholas Society of the City of New York (1920-1930). His political affiliations changed throughout his life; he was a registered Republican (1914-1930) and Independent (1924, 1926, 1931-1932). In 1932, Holmes was critically injured when struck by an automobile while walking home. He was 67 years old at the time and suffered a fractured skull from the hit-and-run driver. Holmes recovered and managed to work another nine years before retiring in 1940 at the age of 75. He died eight years later from arteriosclerotic heart disease on November 10, 1948 in Hathorne, MA at the age of 83 and was buried at Exeter Cemetery in New Hampshire.

== See also ==
- Bank vault
- Bank vaults in the United States
- Safe
- Safe deposit box
