= Old Federal Reserve Bank Building =

Old Federal Reserve Bank Building may refer to:

- Old Federal Reserve Bank Building (Philadelphia)
- Old Federal Reserve Bank Building (San Francisco)

== See also ==
- Federal Reserve Bank Building (disambiguation)
