= Victory Building =

Victory Building may refer to the following places:

- Victory Building (Hastings, Nebraska), listed on the National Register of Historic Places
- Victory Building (Cleveland, Ohio), listed on the National Register of Historic Places
- New York Mutual Life Insurance Company Building, in Philadelphia, also known as the Victory Building or The Victory
