= Mosler =

Mosler can refer to:

- Mosler Automotive, an American supercar and race car company
- Mosler Safe Company, a defunct American safe manufacturer
- Mosler (grape), an alternative name for the Hungarian wine grape Furmint

== As a surname ==
People whose surname is or was Mosler include:

- Henry Mosler (1841–1920), United States artist
- Warren Mosler (born 1949), United States economist
