= Hall's Safe & Lock Co. =

Defunct lock and safe manufacturer

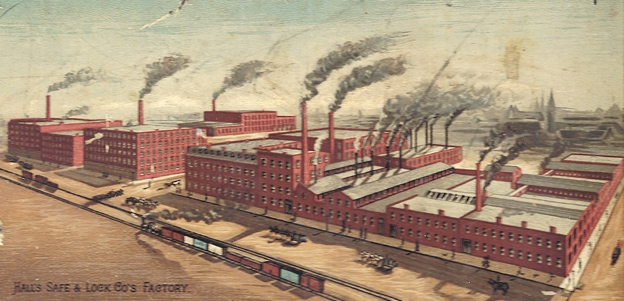
- Hall's Safe & Lock Factory – SWC of Pearl and Plum Streets, Cincinnati, Ohio
- Founded: 1867
- Founder: Joseph L. Hall
- Headquarters: Cincinnati, Ohio,
- Key people: Joseph L. Hall (president); Edward C. Hall (vice president); Richard T. Pullen (secretary); Henry Gross; Milton Dalton
- Products: Victor Combination Lock; Premier Bank Lock; Hall's Infallible Lockout Protection; Hall's Standard Safes

The Hall's Safe & Lock Company was an American manufacturer of locks, safes, and bank vaults throughout the second half of the 19th century.

Incorporated by Joseph L. Hall in 1867, the Hall's Safe & Lock Co. of Cincinnati, Ohio quickly grew to become the largest safe and vault manufacturer in the world. By 1892 it was responsible for "one-half the entire output of fire proof and burglar proof safes and vaults in the United States" and had offices throughout the United States and much of the rest of the world.

== History ==
=== Early years (1846–1866) ===
Joseph L. Hall cycled through a number of business partners and company names in the earliest years prior to incorporating and establishing Hall's Safe & Lock Co.

E. & J. L. Hall (1846–1850), E. Hall & Co. (1850–1851) : Joseph L. Hall first began in business with his father Edward H. Hall in a small and largely inconsequential way in Pittsburgh, PA in 1846 before moving the business to Cincinnati in 1848.

Hall & Dodds (1852–1854), Hall, Dodds, & Co (1854–1856): William B. Dodds bought Edward Hall's interest and partnered with Joseph L. Hall in 1851 to form the firm Hall & Dodds. They employed 15 people and produced two safes per week.

Hall & Carroll (1856–1858), Hall, Carroll, & Co. (1858–1862): William Carroll and Charles Carroll partnered with Joseph L. Hall under the name Hall, Carroll & Co. Around 1862 the factory was moved to the southwest corner of Pearl and Plum streets in Cincinnati, Ohio, where it would remain and grow.

Joseph L. Hall & Co. (1862–1867): During the American Civil War demand for safes waned. As always, Joseph L. Hall adapted to the times and took a government contract to alter and rifle five thousand Austrian muskets. Having no machinery or experience he managed to deliver in the requisite thirty days. This success would lead to other government contracts during those years.

Hall's Safe & Lock Co. 1867–1892: In 1867, Joseph L. Hall incorporated the Hall's Safe & Lock Co. and become its president and treasurer, O.Y. Cone became vice president, and J.B. Marling became secretary.

=== Laying the foundation (1867–1870) ===
At this time the factory was only "100 feet square and two stories high" and in 1868, Joseph L. Hall's eldest son Edward C. Hall Sr. would enter full-time employment in the firm as a clerk.

One of the firm's earliest employees was Henry Gross, and in 1869 he was granted a patent for a combination lock that would become known as the Hall Premier. This well positioned Hall for competition against the leading lock manufacturers of the time, Yale & Town Mfg. Co. and Sargent & Greenleaf. And he was up to the task, as seen in a series of correspondence and news articles between Hall's and Sargent in regards to a lock-picking challenge instigated by James Sargent in 1870.

=== Company expansions (1871–1880) ===
Following the great Chicago fires of October 1871, Hall's safes were the only ones “proven to be secure”, protecting their contents inside through fires that lasted for as much as ten days. Hundreds of customer testimonials surfaced which Hall would use to his advantage in advertisements far and wide. As a result, the company began to grow immensely in both reputation and size and was known to be four times the capacity of similar factories. By 1872 the firm had grown to 460 employees and produced between 20 and 25 safes per day. And as of 1874, twenty percent of new banks in the U.S. were using Hall's safes, and two-thirds of bankers in Chicago were using Hall's Safes.

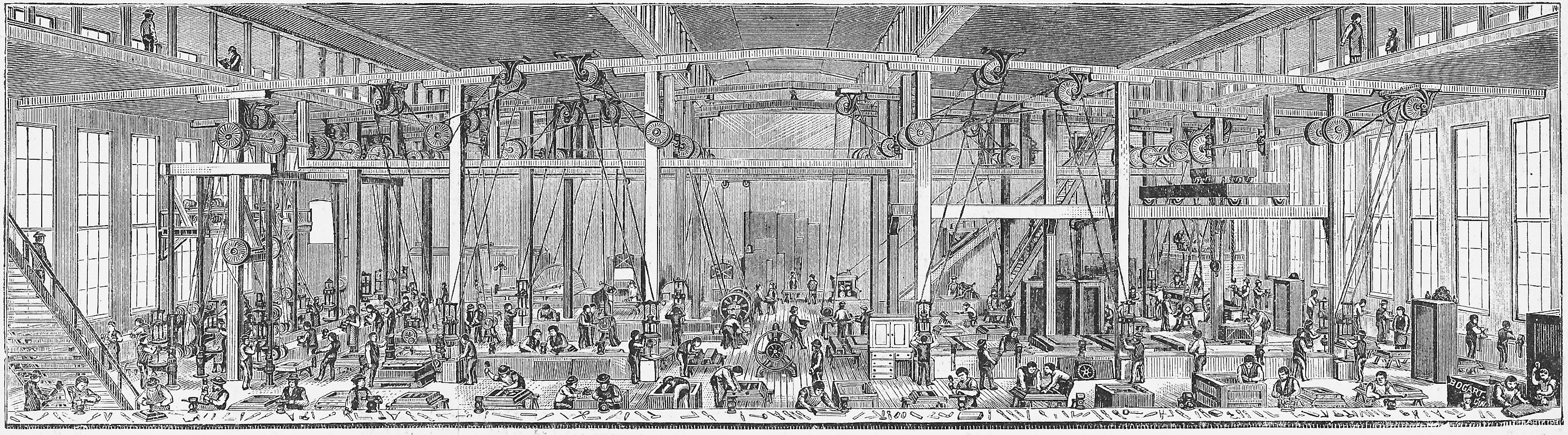
Cut of Burglar Room. Hall's Safe & Lock Co. Factory circa 1878

In 1874, Joseph L. Hall's third son, William H. Hall, would begin working for the firm in the Lock Department. By 1878 he would be in charge of the shipping department.

Due to increasing litigation surrounding the safe and lock industry, Hall hired Milton A. Dalton in 1873 "to pursue what must be one of the boldest and broadest acts of corporate espionage ever." He set out to interview every active safe maker in the United States and Europe and managed to gather evidence detailing the development and progress of the industry in detail. The evidence in this book would help to prove that Hall held a patent for the use of conical bolts in safe manufacture that pre-dated safe maker MacNeale & Urban as detailed in a court case that began in 1875 and was decided in Hall's favor in 1883.

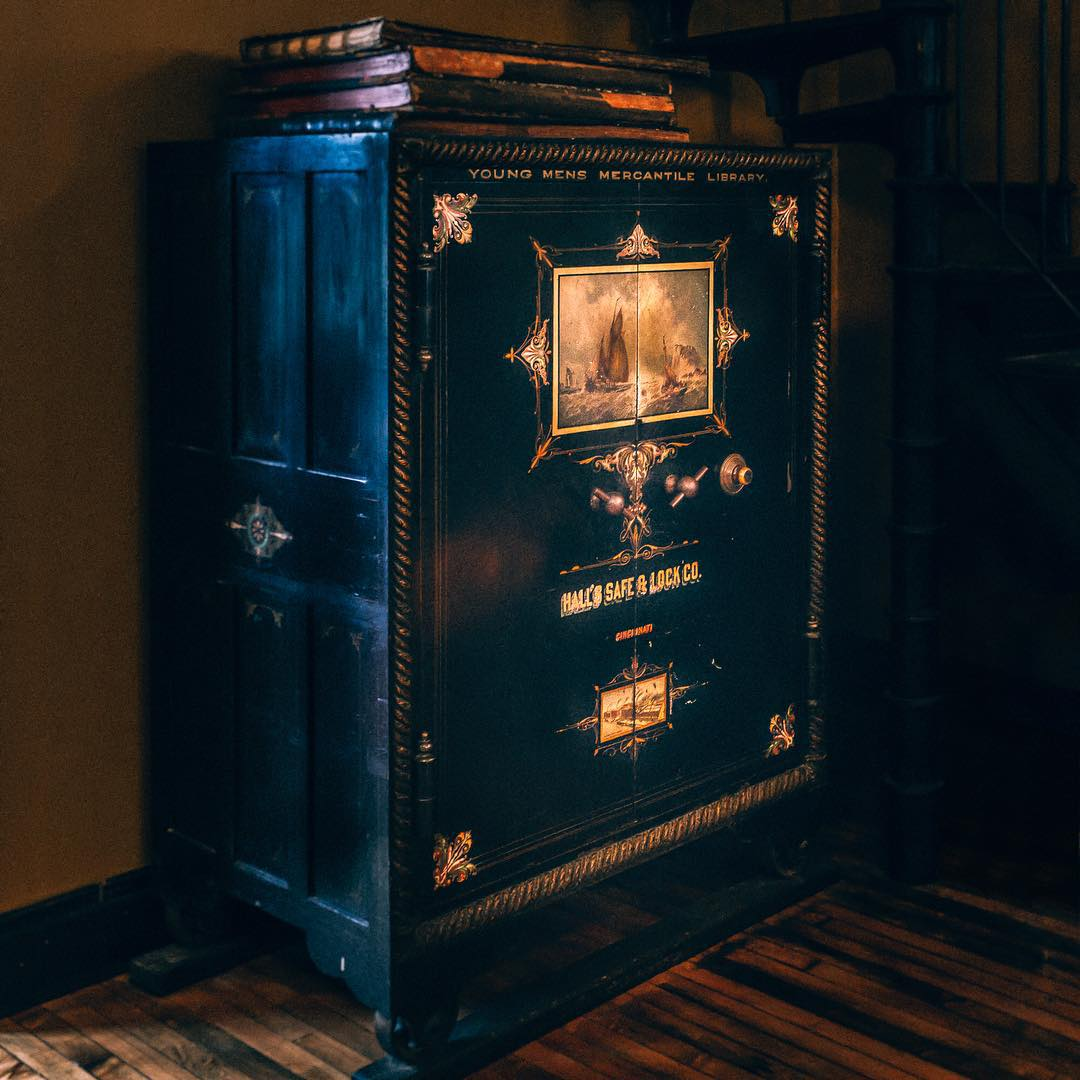
Hall's Safe & Lock Safe - Mercantile Building, Cincinnati, Ohio

According to President Ulysses S. Grant's papers, in 1875, Joseph L. Hall was in correspondence to acquire the President's farm in St. Louis as a possible new location for the factory. However, these talks bore no fruit, and the seriousness of Joseph L. Hall's true interest in moving the factory is in doubt.

In 1875 Hall's Safe & Lock Co. entered the nascent time lock business.

=== Controlling the industry (1880–1889) ===
In 1880, Joseph L. Hall created the Consolidated Time Lock company to house the time lock portion of his business. That same year the Berkshire Savings bank was sued by Yale for using a Consolidated time lock which Yale claimed infringed on its patent. In an unprecedented move at the time, Joseph L. Hall, knowing that Consolidated was the "real party in interest", petitioned the court to have Consolidated substituted as the defendant in the case. The case would eventually end up in the Supreme Court.

In 1883 rumors again circulated that Hall's factory was going to move from Cincinnati. Joseph L. Hall dismissed these rumors stating that he never intended to move but always found the press about them to be favorable advertisement.

The Hall's Safe & Lock Co. factory continued to grow to over 8 acres. It employed up to 1,365 people and produced 65 safes per day. Every month it consumed 800,000 pounds of iron and 450,000 pounds of steel.

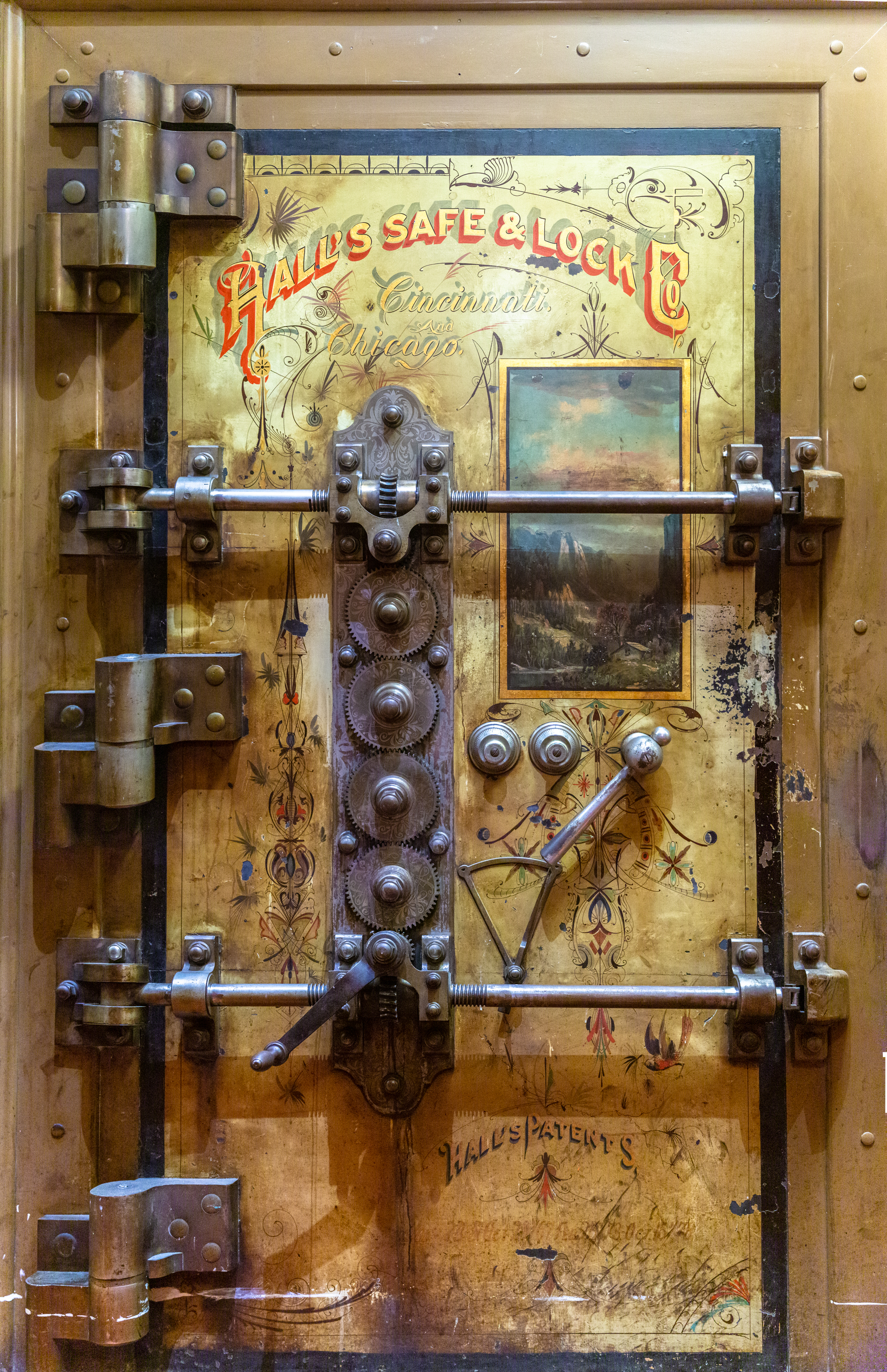
Hall's Safe & Lock Co Vault Door - Milwaukee circa 1886

=== Final years (1889–1892) ===
In March 1889 Joseph L. Hall died from a heart attack at his home in Walnut Hills at the age of 66. His safe company was at its peak and his legal battle with Sargent and Yale would not be resolved by the Supreme Court until later that year – and it would be resolved in his favor, albeit posthumously.

Joseph L. Hall's eldest son Edward C. Hall Sr. took over as president, and, though the company continued to grow, the family looked to sell the business. In 1892 they would accomplish that goal through the formation and merging of 5 firms to form the Herring-Hall-Marvin Company.

== Notable historical appearances ==
- Buffalo Bill Cody Safe
- U.S. Senate Safe

== Legacy ==
- Herring-Hall-Marvin Co.
- The Hall's Safe Co.

== Office, agency, and salesroom locations ==
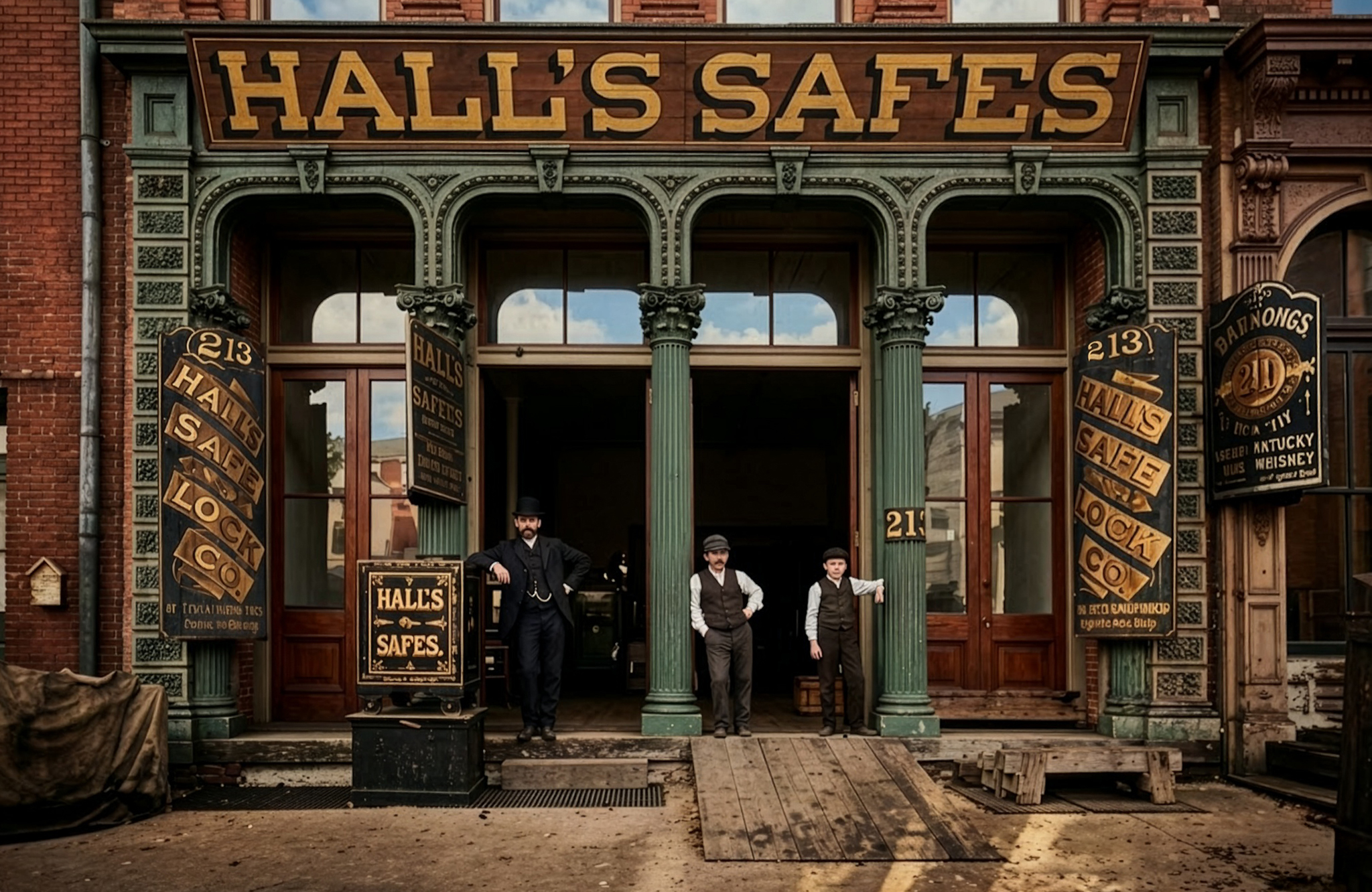
Hall's Safe & Lock Salesroom - Louisville, KY - 1880s

Cincinnati

- South -West Corner Pearl and Plum Sts – Manufactory & Principal Office
- 69 W. Fourth St. – Showroom at Pike's Opera House

San Francisco

- 1871–1876 – 537 Market St.
- Oct 1876–1878 – 210 Sansome St.
- 1882–1887 – 211 & 213 California St.
- Aug 1888–1891 – 609 & 611 Market Street – Under the Grand Hotel
- 1890 – 8 & 10 Pine St. b/w Front and Davis – Temporary location due to fire at the Grand Hotel

Chicago

- 1866–1871 – 93 Dearborn St.
- 1872–1876 – 147 & 149 Dearborn St.
- 1883 – 67 Washington St.

New York City

- 1873–1876 – 345 & 347 Broadway St.
- 1876-1878 - 294 Broadway St.
- 1883 – 279 & 281 Broadway St.

Louisville

- 1873–1876 – NE Corner Main and Fifth Sts

Cleveland

- 1873–1876 – 182 Superior St.

Philadelphia

- 1891 – 17 S. Ninth

Omaha

- 1882–1888 – 1018 & 1020 Farnham St. – P. Boyer and Co.

Boston

- 1873–1876 – 70 Hanover St.
- 1888 – 66 Sudbury

Denver

- 1887 – 1654 Lawrence

St. Louis

- 1878 – 410 Third St.
- 1873 – 1876 302 N. Fourth St.

St. Paul

- 1875 – 46 Jackson St.

Pittsburgh

- 1873–1874 – 93 Smithfield St.

Richmond

- 1891 – 28 N. Ninth – B.F. Smith

Honolulu

- 1891 – 66 Fort St.

== Court cases ==
- Hall v. Macneale & Urban
- Hall v. Sargent & Yale
