= Old Federal Reserve Bank =

Old Federal Reserve Bank may refer to:

- Old Federal Reserve Bank Building (Philadelphia)
- Old Federal Reserve Bank Building (San Francisco)
