= Federal Reserve Bank Building =

Federal Reserve Bank Building may refer to:

- Federal Reserve Board East Building
- Federal Reserve Bank of Atlanta Birmingham Branch, Birmingham, Alabama
- Federal Reserve Bank Building (Little Rock, Arkansas)
- Federal Reserve Bank of San Francisco, Los Angeles Branch, Los Angeles, California
- Federal Reserve Bank of San Francisco (San Francisco, California)
- Federal Reserve Bank Building (Seattle)
- Federal Reserve Bank of Richmond, Baltimore Branch, Baltimore, Maryland
- Federal Reserve Bank Building (Boston)
- Federal Reserve Bank of Chicago Detroit Branch Building, Detroit, Michigan
- 925 Grand, the former Federal Reserve Building in Kansas City, Missouri
- Federal Reserve Bank of Kansas City, Kansas City, Missouri
- Federal Reserve Bank of New York, New York, New York
- Federal Reserve Bank of Cleveland, Cleveland, Ohio
- Old Federal Reserve Bank Building (Philadelphia), Philadelphia, Pennsylvania
- Federal Reserve Bank of Atlanta, Nashville, Tennessee
- Eccles Building, Washington, D.C., home to the board of governors of the Federal Reserve System
