= Peter Strange =

Peter or Pete Strange may refer to:

== Real People ==
- Pete Strange (1938-2004), musician
- Peter Strange (pornographic actor), real name Jake Steed
- Peter S. Strange, chairman of the Federal Reserve Bank of Cleveland Cincinnati Branch

== Fictional characters ==
- Peter Strange, the central character in 1968 film The Strange Affair
- Peter Strange, in After the Ball (1932 film)
