= Provident Mutual Insurance Company =

Historic building in Philadelphia

- Provident Mutual Insurance Company Building
- U.S. National Register of Historic Places
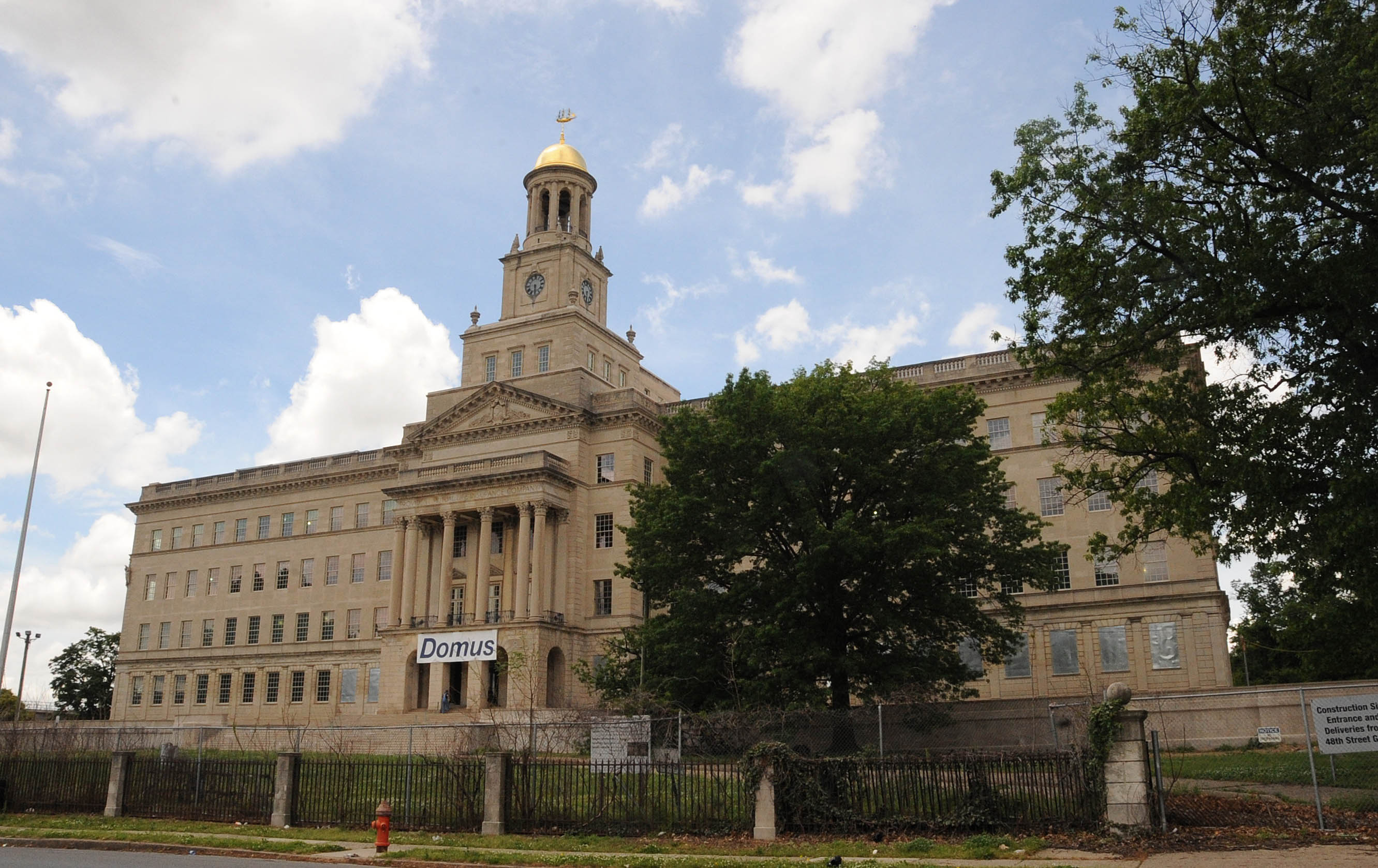
- Building in 2020
- Location: 4601 Market Street, Philadelphia, Pennsylvania
- Coordinates: 39.9595°N 75.2152°W
- Area: 150,000 sq ft (building); 12.5 acres (lot)
- Built: 1927
- Architect: Cram and Ferguson
- Architectural style: Neoclassical
- NRHP reference No.: 100004809
- Added to NRHP: December 30, 2019

The Provident Mutual Insurance Company Building is a building located on 4601 Market Street in Mill Creek, Philadelphia. It was added to the National Register of Historic Places on December 30, 2019.

== Founding and use as bank building ==
The Provident Mutual Insurance Company (PMIC), was founded by Quakers in 1865, later growing to a sizeable bank in the Greater Philadelphia area. It purchased a lot of land at 46th and Market Street in the Mill Creek neighborhood of Philadelphia. The goal was to move the headquarters of the company from its downtown location, and Cram and Ferguson Architects were hired to design the new location on the purchased plot of land. For a cost of $3,000,000 ($56,000,000 in 2026), it was completed in 1927 in the Classical revival architectural style at a height of six stories. The bank vault was designed by Frederick S. Holmes. A nearby 19th-century pump to draw water from Mill Creek predated the building's construction. The building served as the headquarters for the company until 1983. At that time, PMIC moved back to Center City Philadelphia due to the cost of maintaining the property and urban decay in the area.

== Subsequent sales and other commercial uses ==
The company donated the building to the Urban Education Foundation, which was owned by Cheyney University and Lincoln University. It was purchased in 1991 and renamed the "Center for Human Advancement".

It was taken over by the city of Philadelphia, and more than $52,000,000 was spent in renovations during a failed attempt to turn it into a police station. It was put in the hands of the Philadelphia Industrial Development Corporation, which completed its work by 2014. It was purchased in 2020 by a real estate company and subsequently leased to commercial tenants.
