= Federal Reserve Bank of Cleveland Pittsburgh Branch =

Office of the Federal Reserve Bank of Cleveland

Coordinates: 40°26′34″N 79°59′41″W

The Federal Reserve Bank of Cleveland Pittsburgh Branch Office is one of two Federal Reserve Bank of Cleveland branch offices (the other is in Cincinnati). The Pittsburgh Office of the Federal Reserve Bank of Cleveland hosts one of two savings bonds processing sites in the nation. The Pittsburgh branch presides over Jefferson, Monroe and Belmont counties in Ohio, Wetzel, Tyler, Pleasants, Marshall, Ohio, Brooke and Hancock counties in West Virginia, and all of Western Pennsylvania. In 1915 it was revealed that the Pittsburgh branch location was to be the new home of a relocated Cleveland Fed District with a majority vote secured on the board of governors, but the U.S. Attorney General at the time nixed moving the Cleveland, Kansas City, Minneapolis, Boston and Atlanta Federal Reserve Districts, stating that it would instead take an act of Congress to move those district headquarters. Pittsburgh remained a branch location only.

== Building ==
The vault was designed by Fredrick S. Holmes and built by the York Safe & Lock Co. in 1931.

The original 1931 building, designed by the noted Cleveland architecture firm Walker and Weeks, was seven stories tall, and a 10-story addition to the structure was completed in 1958 with roughly 200,000 square feet of total space. The Art Deco facade of the original Georgia marble building is ornamented with three cast aluminum figures, representing mining, agriculture and commerce, by the New York sculptor Henry Hering. The building was listed as a Pittsburgh History & Landmarks Foundation Historic Landmark in 2001.

== Staff cuts, move, and sale of building ==
For decades the Pittsburgh branch office of FRB Cleveland shared responsibility with FRB Minneapolis for processing all US Savings Bond transactions, this service being provided by the Federal Reserve System to the US Treasury. Employees at the complex numbered 300-350 in total. With the increase in electronic processing, the US Treasury determined that reduced staffing and only one Federal Reserve site was required for such services, and the operation in Minneapolis was named as the sole site. Pittsburgh branch staff was reduced during 2011-2012 from about 320 to 25 in three separate layoffs.

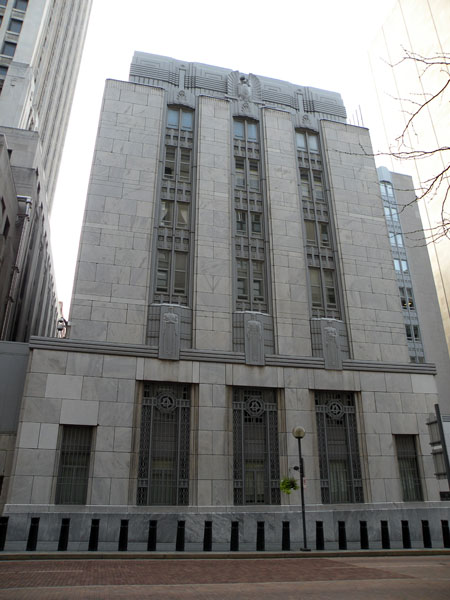
Federal Reserve Bank of Cleveland Pittsburgh Branch, built from 1930 to 1931, located at 717 Grant Street in Downtown Pittsburgh and home to the bank until October, 2012.

In October 2012 the Reserve branch office relocated to

One Oxford Centre, Suite 3000
301 Grant Street
Pittsburgh, PA 15219
Phone: 412.261.7800

M&J Wilkow purchased the building for $3.75 million in July 2013, and sold it for an undisclosed amount to Drury Hotels, which reopened the conveyed building as a hotel in 2017.

== Current Board of Directors ==
The following people are on the board of directors as of 2020:

=== Appointed by the Federal Reserve Bank ===
Appointed by the Federal Reserve Bank
Name	Title	Term Expires
Audrey Dunning	President and Chief Executive Officer; AMP Growth Advisors, LLC; Cranberry Township, Pennsylvania	2020
Robert I. Glimcher	President; Glimcher Group Inc. Pittsburgh, Pennsylvania	2020
Vera Krekanova	Chief Strategy and Research Officer Allegheny Conference on Community Development; Pittsburgh, Pennsylvania	2021
Shelley L. Fant	President and Chief Executive Officer; FCG Solutions, Inc. Pittsburgh, Pennsylvania	2022

=== Appointed by the Board of Governors ===
Appointed by the Board of Governors
Name	Title	Term Expires
Suzanne Mellon	President Carlow University; Pittsburgh, Pennsylvania	2020
Dmitri D. Shiry (Chair)	Retired Partner Deloitte LLP Pittsburgh, Pennsylvania	2021
Kathryn Z. Klaber	Managing Partner The Klaber Group Sewickley, Pennsylvania	2022

== See also ==
- Federal Reserve Act
- Federal Reserve System
- Federal Reserve Districts
- Federal Reserve Branches
- Federal Reserve Bank of Cleveland
- Federal Reserve Bank of Cleveland Cincinnati Branch Office
