= East Center City Commercial Historic District =

Historic district in Pennsylvania, United States

- U.S. National Register of Historic Places
- U.S. Historic district
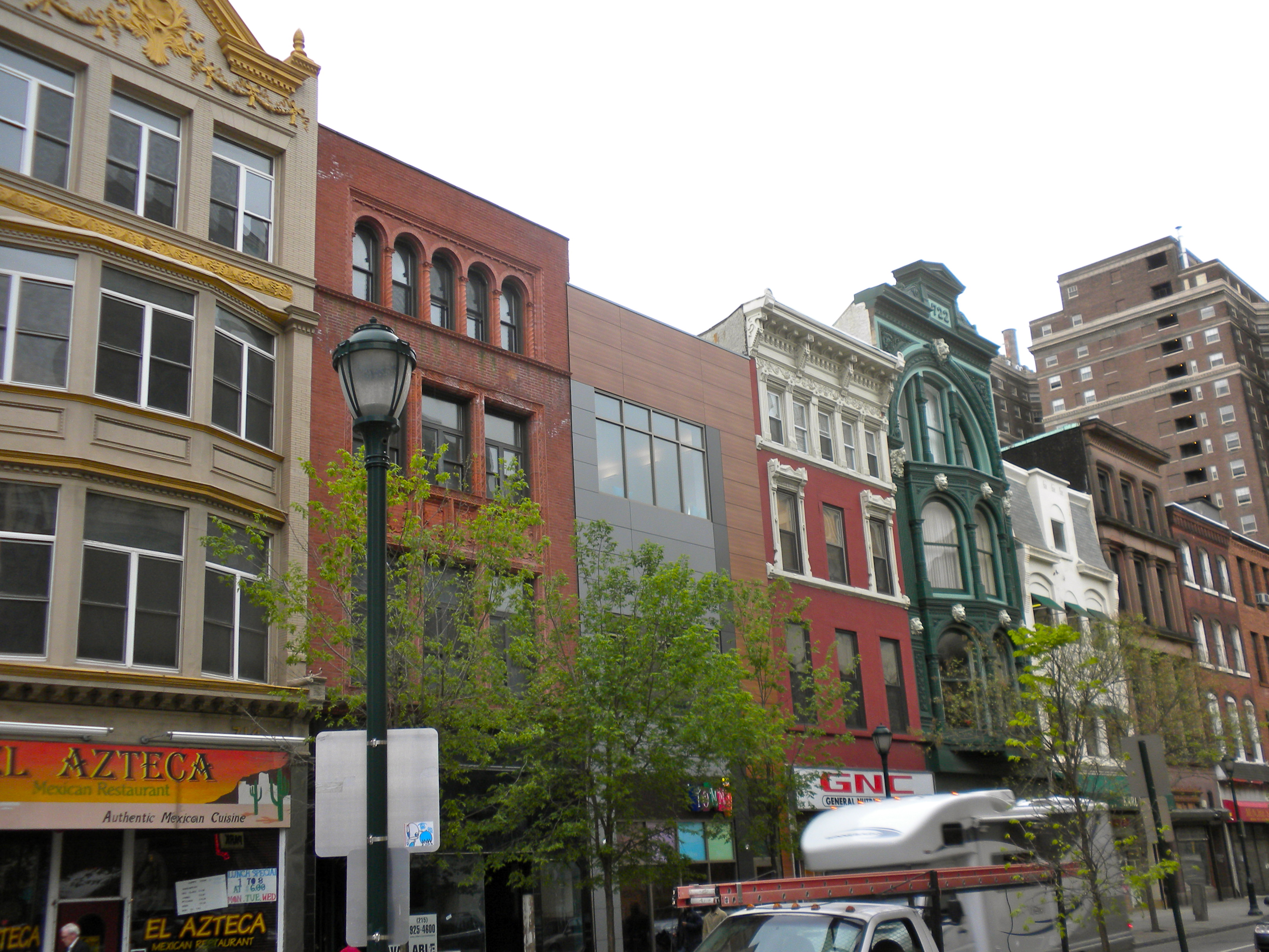
- 700 block Chestnut, East Center City Commercial Historic District, April 2010

- Location within Philadelphia Location within Pennsylvania Location within the United States
- Location: Roughly bounded by 6th, Juniper, Market and Locust Sts., Philadelphia, Pennsylvania
- Coordinates: 39°57′5″N 75°9′33″W
- Area: 88 acres (36 ha)
- Built: 1799
- Architectural style: Late 19th And 20th Century Revivals, Late Victorian, Federal
- NRHP reference No.: 84003531 (original); 100002523 (increase)

Significant dates
- Added to NRHP: July 5, 1984
- Boundary increase: May 24, 2018

The East Center City Commercial Historic District is a national historic district located in the Washington Square neighborhood of Philadelphia, Pennsylvania. It encompasses 287 contributing structures, including large and small commercial buildings, banks, hotels, newspapers, clubs, and restaurants.

This district was added to the National Register of Historic Places in 1984, and underwent boundary adjustments in 2018.

== History ==
The nomination form requesting placement of this historic district on the National Register of Historic Places was completed by George E. Thomas, PhD of the Clio Group, Inc. on March 6, 1984. Following reviews by state and national historic preservation committees, the district was officially listed on the National Register in 1984.

In 2018, approval was sought and obtained to revise the district's boundaries from those defined on the original NRHP nomination form. In addition, the historical period of significance for this district was expanded to facilitate the addition to this listing of historically significant structures which had been erected after 1934. As a result, twenty-eight additional contributing elements were subsequently added, including the Rohm and Haas headquarters building.

== Notable architecture ==
Notable buildings in Philadelphia's East Center City Commercial Historic District include the Curtis Publishing Co. (1907), Lits Department Store (1891), Strawbridge and Clothier (1868), Gimbels (1894), Benjamin Franklin Hotel (1922), New York Mutual Life Insurance Company Building (1872, 1890), Aldelphia Hotel (1912), Blum Store (1927), Keystone National Bank (1884), Beck Engraving and "The Press" (1896), Integrity Trust (1923), Quaker City Bank (1892), Philadelphia Club, the Old Federal Reserve Bank (1932), U.S. Post Office and Courthouse, Walnut Street Theatre, and Forrest Theater. It also includes a set of 3 1/2-story townhouses designed by Benjamin Henry Latrobe for William Sansom.
