= Milton A. Dalton =

Milton A. Dalton (b. unknown - d. January 18, 1895) of Cincinnati was an American time lock inventor and one of the founders of the Consolidated Time Lock Co. In 1873 he was commissioned by Joseph L. Hall of the Hall's Safe & Lock Co. to interview safe makers and obtain sworn statements from employees to create the ultimate resource and history of the construction of safes and vaults entitled: History of Fire & Burglar Proof Safes, Bank Locks, and vaults in American and Europe – Useful Information for Bankers, Business Men and Safe Manufacturers. A limited run of 66 copies was printed in 1874, of which, only two are known to remain today. It has been described as "one of the boldest and broadest acts of corporate espionage ever."

Through his role at the Hall's Safe & Lock Co., the Consolidated Time Lock Co., and his numerous patents for both combination and time locks, Milton A. Dalton would leave an indelible mark on the industry even after his death in 1895.

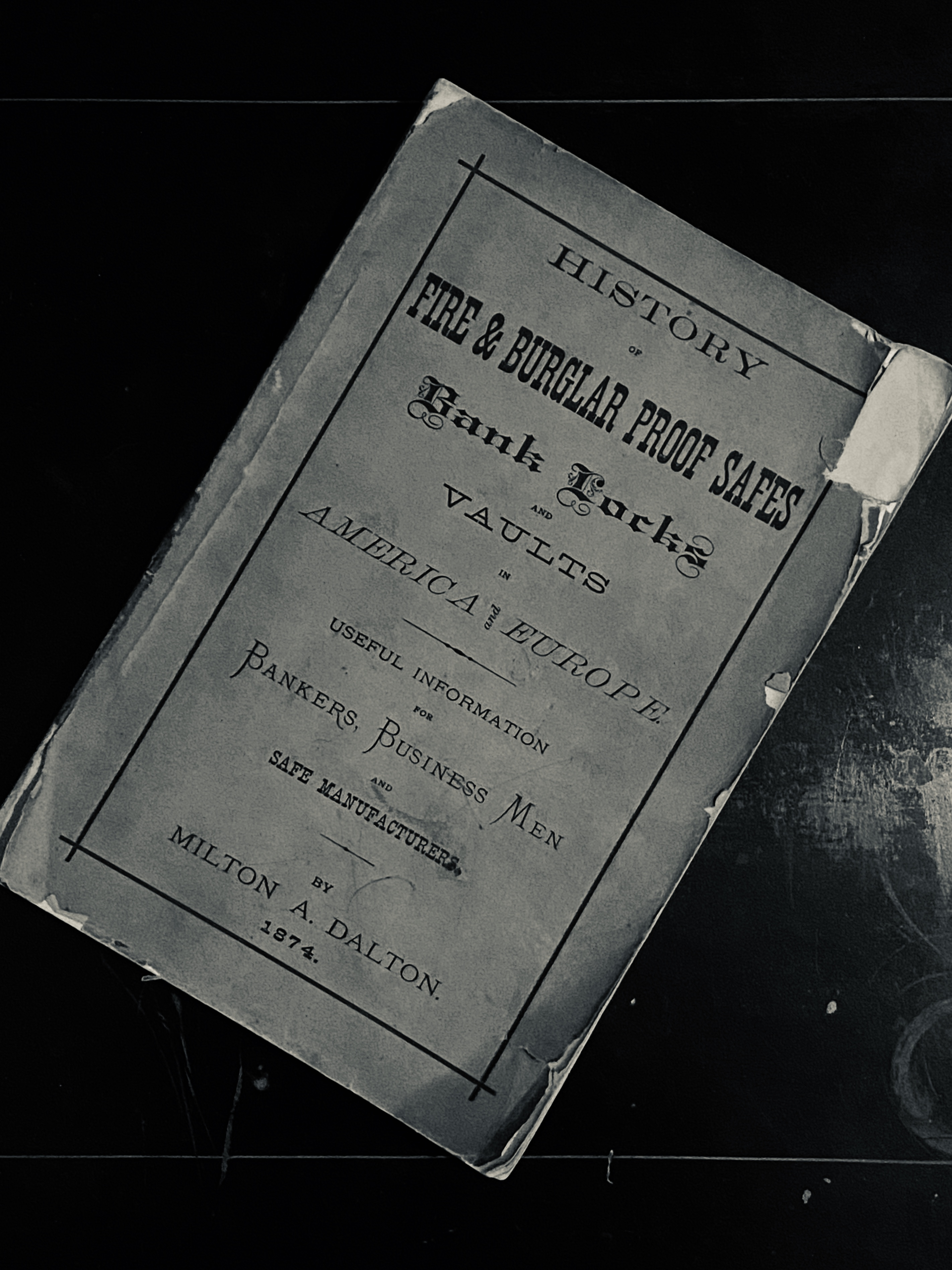
History of Fire & Burglar Proof Safes, Bank Locks, and vaults in America & Europe – Useful Information for Bankers, Business Men, and Safe Manufacturers
