= Henry Fernbach =

American architect (1829–1883)

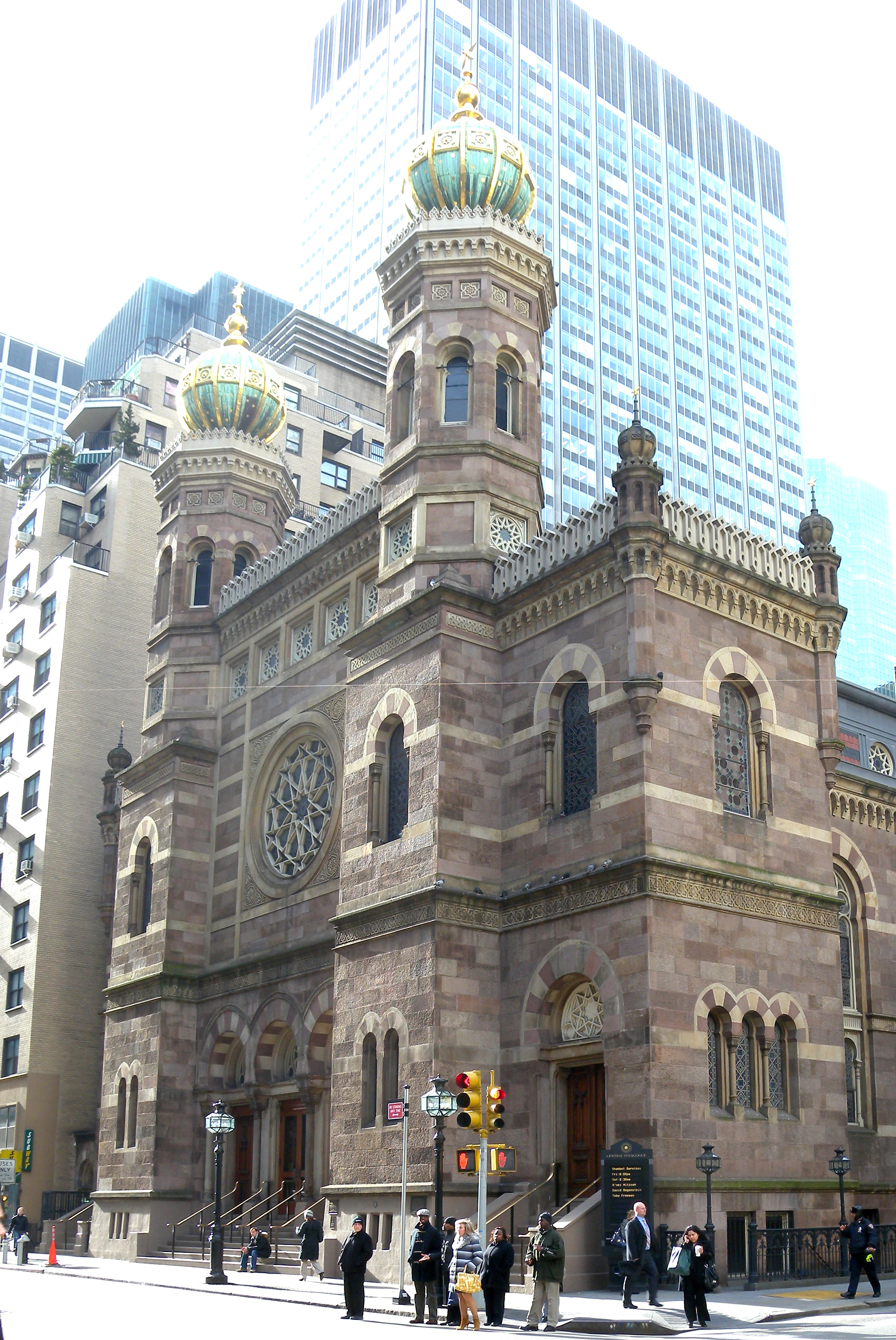
Central Synagogue

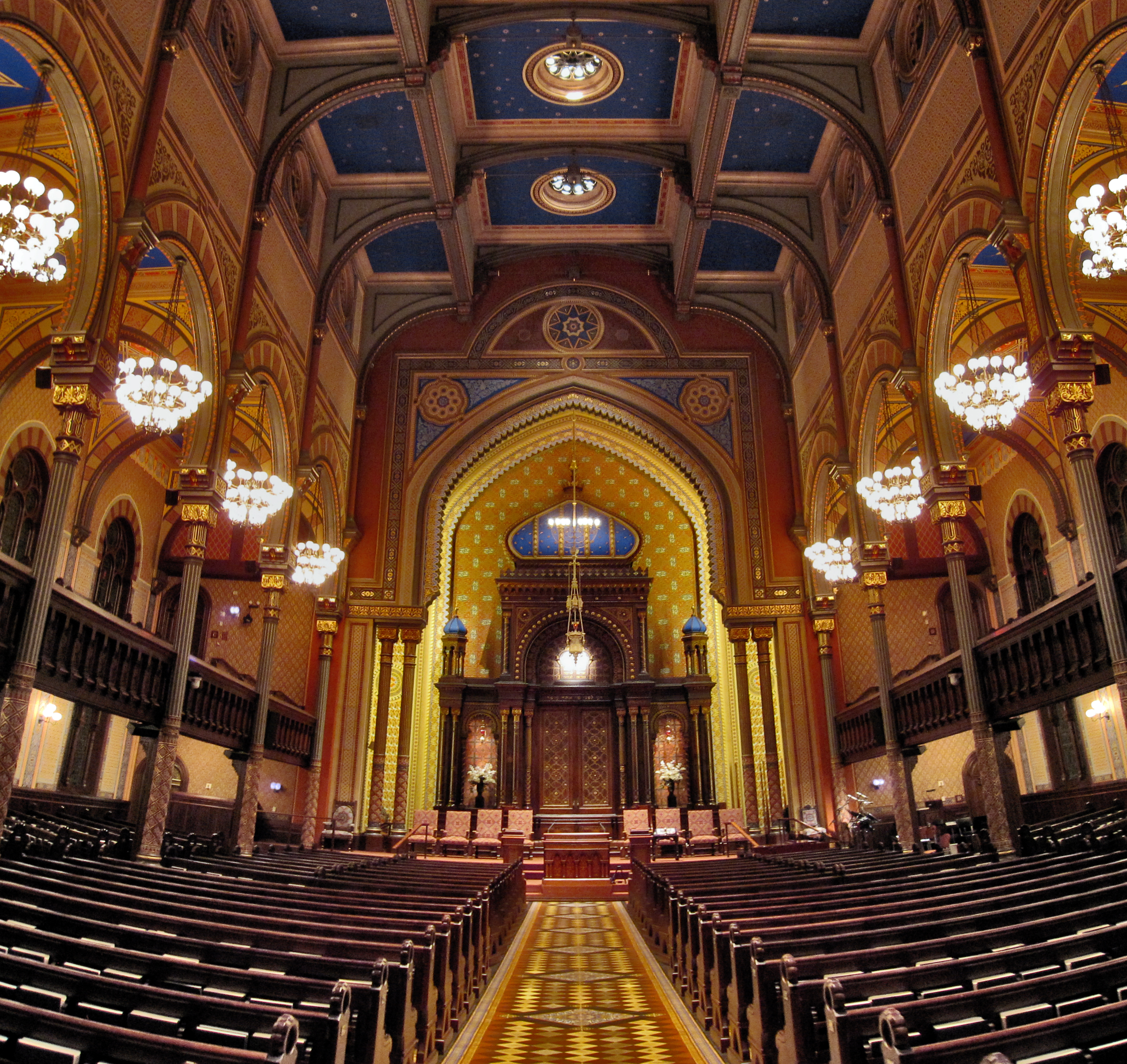
Interior of Central Synagogue

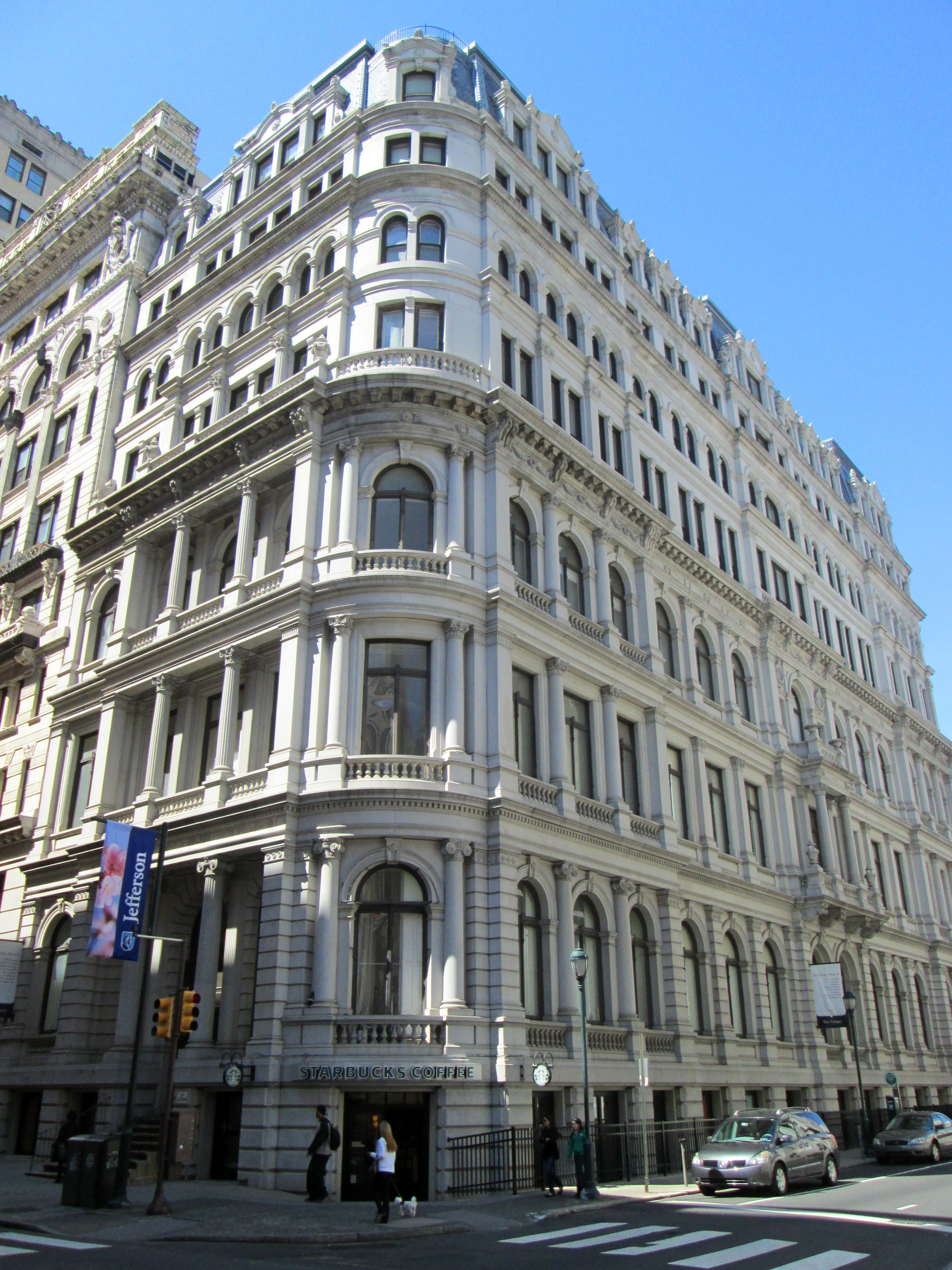
New York Mutual Life Insurance Company Building, top three floors added later designed by Philip Roos

Henry Fernbach (1829–1883) was an architect in New York City. Born in Breslau, which was at the time part of the Kingdom of Prussia, he immigrated to the U.S. in 1848 or in 1855.

== Life ==
Fernbach was a Prussian Jew, and trained at the Bauakademie in Berlin. He is noted for his synagogue designs, mainly in the Moorish Revival architecture style, and for his cast iron facades. Between 1867 and 1883 Fernbach designed more than two dozen of the properties now contributing to the SoHo - Cast Iron Historic District.

He served as Treasurer of the United Association of American Architect. Alfred Zucker and Theodore de Lemos partnered with him. Paul J. Pelz worked as a chief draftsman for him. He designed the German Savings Bank with Edward H. Kendall.

== Work ==
- First Jewish Orphan Asylum, East 77th Street near Third Avenue, NYC (1863)
- original permanent location, Harmonie Club, 45 West Forty-Second Street, NYC (1867)
- entrance gate, Salem Fields Cemetery, 775 Jamaica Avenue, Brooklyn (1867)
- Temple Emanu-El, 43rd Street and 5th Avenue, with architect Leopold Eidlitz (1868; razed 1927)
- Central Synagogue, 652 Lexington Avenue, NYC (1870–72)
- 67, 69, 71, 75, 77, 81 Greene Street (1873)
- Victory Building, 1001-05 Chestnut Street, Philadelphia, Pennsylvania (1873–75)
- Stern Brothers Department Store, 32-36 West 23rd Street, NYC, expanded in stages (1878, 1878, 1880)
- Eden Musée, 55 West 23rd Street, NYC (Fernbach died mid-project; completed by Theodore de Lemos) (1884)
- 113, 115 Spring Streets, lofts with Tuscan columns and cast iron fronts
- SoHo Hotel at 101-111 Greene Street (not the new buildings 101 and 107–11 by Joseph Pell Lombardi)
