= Federal Reserve Bank of Cleveland Cincinnati Branch =

Office of the Federal Reserve Bank of Cleveland

Coordinates: 39°06′03″N 84°30′36″W

The Federal Reserve Bank of Cleveland Cincinnati Branch Office is one of two Federal Reserve Bank of Cleveland branch offices (the other is in Pittsburgh). Frederick S. Holmes designed the bank vaults at these locations. The Cincinnati Office of the Federal Reserve Bank of Cleveland provides currency distribution services for financial institutions in multiple Reserve Districts. Jill P. Meyer is the current chairman.

== Current Board of Directors ==
The following people are on the board of directors as of 2017:

=== Appointed by the Federal Reserve Bank ===
appointed by the Federal Reserve Bank
Name	Title	Term Expires
Alfonso Cornejo	President; Hispanic Chamber Cincinnati USA; Cincinnati, Ohio	2017
Amos L. Otis	Founder, President, and Chief Executive Officer; SoBran, Inc. Dayton, Ohio	2017
Tucker Ballinger	President and Chief Executive Officer; Forcht Bank, N.A. Lexington, Kentucky	2018
Darin C. Hall	Executive Vice President; Port of Greater Cincinnati Development Authority; Cincinnati, Ohio	2019
David C. Evans	CEO and President; TESSEC LLC; Dayton, Ohio	2021

=== Appointed by the Board of Governors ===
appointed by the Board of Governors
Name	Title	Term Expires
Deborah A. Feldman	President and Chief Executive Officer; Dayton Children's Hospital; Dayton, Ohio	2017
Christopher C. Cole	Chairman and General Manager; Intelligrated Inc. Mason, Ohio	2018
Valarie L. Sheppard (Chair)	Senior Vice President, Comptroller, and Treasurer; The Procter & Gamble Company; Cincinnati, Ohio	2019

== See also ==
- Federal Reserve System
- Federal Reserve Districts
