= Federal Reserve Bank Building (Little Rock, Arkansas) =

Historic building in Little Rock, Arkansas, U.S.

- U.S. National Register of Historic Places
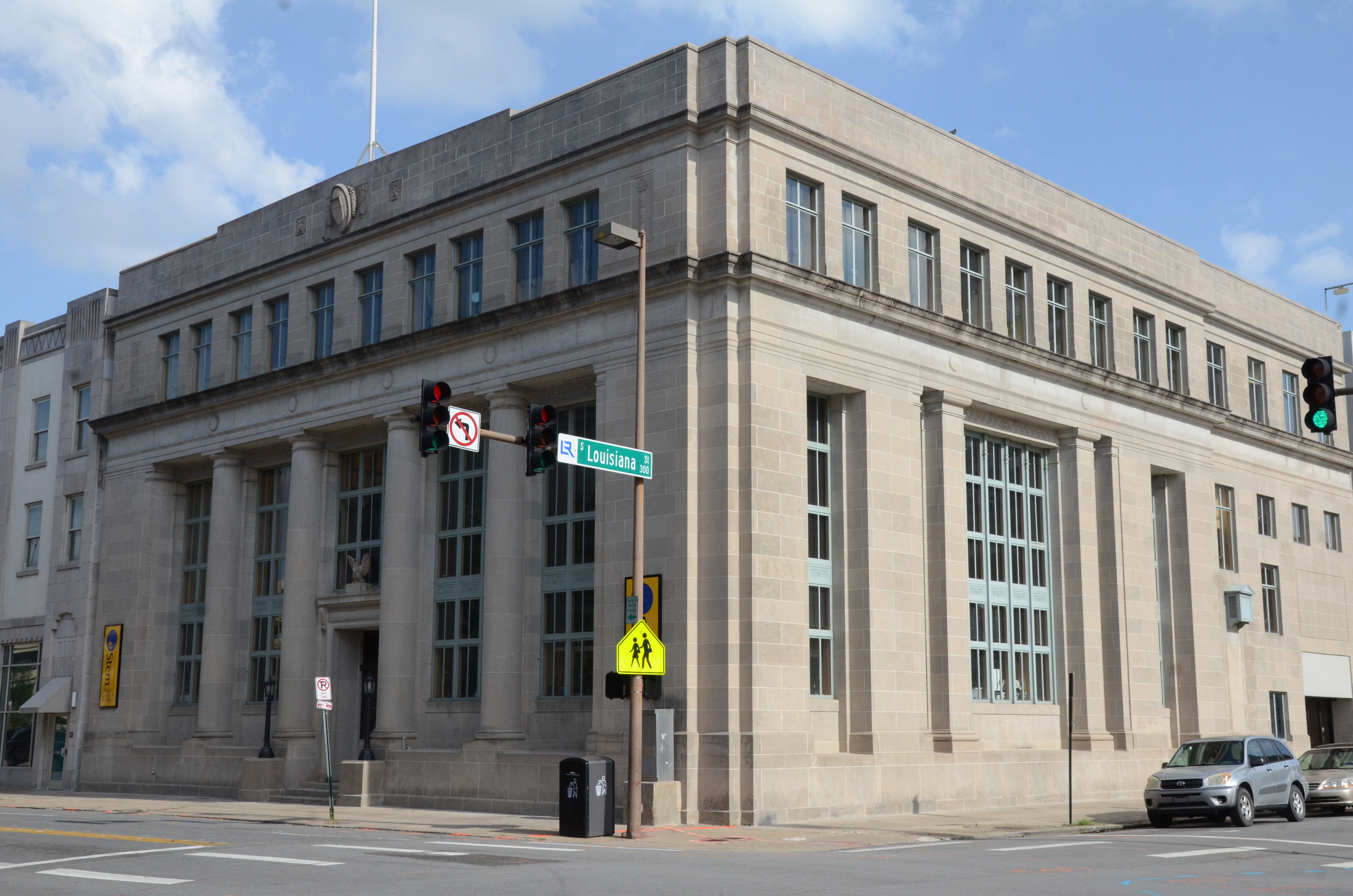

- Location within Arkansas Location within the United States
- Location: 123 W. Third St., Little Rock, Arkansas, U.S.
- Coordinates: 34°44′45″N 92°16′15″W
- Area: less than one acre
- Built: 1924
- Architect: Thompson & Harding
- Architectural style: Classical Revival
- MPS: Thompson, Charles L., Design Collection TR
- NRHP reference No.: 86002895
- Added to NRHP: October 23, 1986

The Federal Reserve Bank Building is a historic commercial building at 123 West Third Street in Little Rock, Arkansas, United States. It is a three-story Classical Revival masonry structure, built out of concrete faced with limestone. Its main facade features a central entry set in a recess supported by four monumental engaged Doric columns. The entrance surround includes a carved eagle. Above the colonnade is a band of metal casement windows, with a low parapet at the top. The building was designed by noted local architect Thompson & Harding and built in 1924. The building was occupied by the Federal Reserve Bank of St. Louis Little Rock Branch until 1966.

The building was listed on the National Register of Historic Places in 1986.

== See also ==
- National Register of Historic Places listings in Little Rock, Arkansas
