= New York Mutual Life Insurance Company Building =

- U.S. National Register of Historic Places
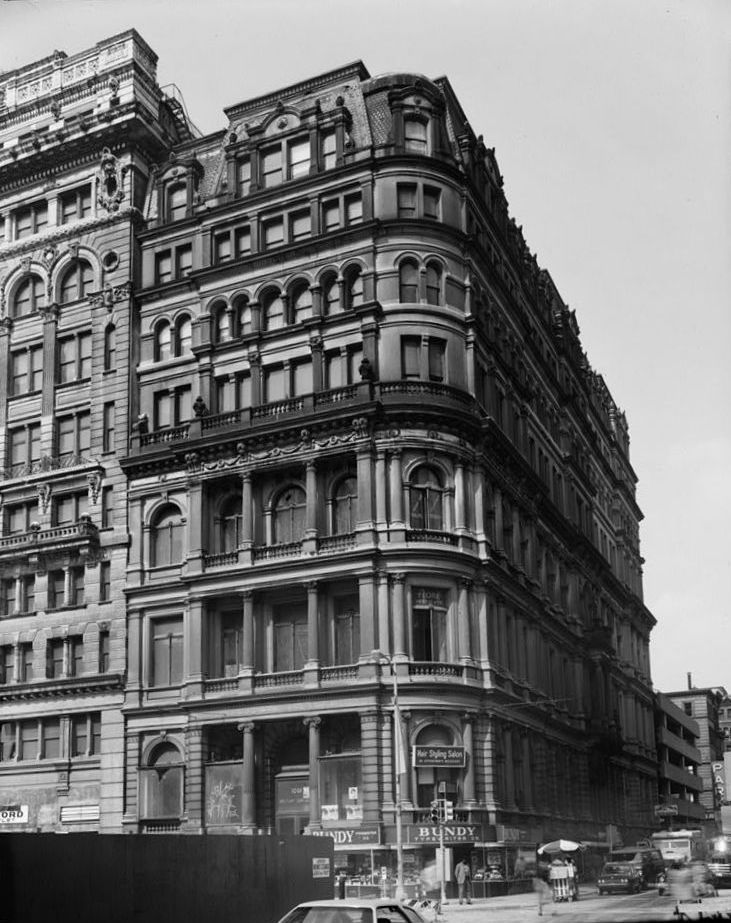
- New York Mutual Life Insurance Company Building, HABS photo, 1975

- Location within Philadelphia Location within Pennsylvania Location within the United States
- Location: 1003 Chestnut Street, Philadelphia, Pennsylvania
- Coordinates: 39.9500°N 75.1575°W
- Area: less than an acre
- Built: 1873, 1890–1891
- Architect: Henry Fernbach; Phillip W. Roos
- Architectural style: Second Empire
- NRHP reference No.: 80003615
- Added to NRHP: June 6, 1980

The New York Mutual Life Insurance Company Building, also known as the Victory Building, is a historic office building that is located in the Market East neighborhood of Philadelphia, Pennsylvania, United States.

Added to the National Register of Historic Places in 1980, it is part of the East Center City Commercial Historic District.

== History and architectural features ==
Henry Fernbach and Phillip W. Roos are credited as the building's architects. It was built in 1873, and is a seven-story, brick building, faced with granite, and measuring 58 feet by 176 feet. Its three lowest stories feature engaged columns, pilasters, balustrades, and arcades. The top three stories were added between 1890 and 1891. It is topped by a mansard roof in the Second Empire style.
