= James Sargent =

American locksmith and businessman (1824-1910)

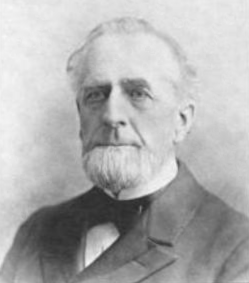
- Born: December 1, 1824; Chester, Vermont
- Died: January 12, 1910 (aged 85); Rochester, New York
- Resting place: Mount Hope Cemetery
- Occupations: Locksmith, businessman
- Spouse: Angelina Foster (m. 1847)
- Children: 1

James Sargent (1824–1910) was an American locksmith and businessman. He founded the Sargent & Greenleaf company.

== Biography ==
Sargent was born in Chester, Vermont on December 1, 1824. He married Angelina Foster in 1847; they had one daughter.

In 1865, Sargent established the Sargent & Greenleaf company.

Later in life, he founded the Sargent Automated Railway Signal Company, one of several predecessors of the General Railway Signal company.

He died at his home in Rochester, New York on January 12, 1910, and was buried at Mount Hope Cemetery.

== Notable innovations ==
- In 1857 Sargent had designed the "Sargent's Magnetic Bank Lock", said to be the first successful key changeable combination lock.
- In 1880 Sargent connected one of his combination locks to a delay timer, creating the first time-delay combination locks.
