= Sargent & Greenleaf =

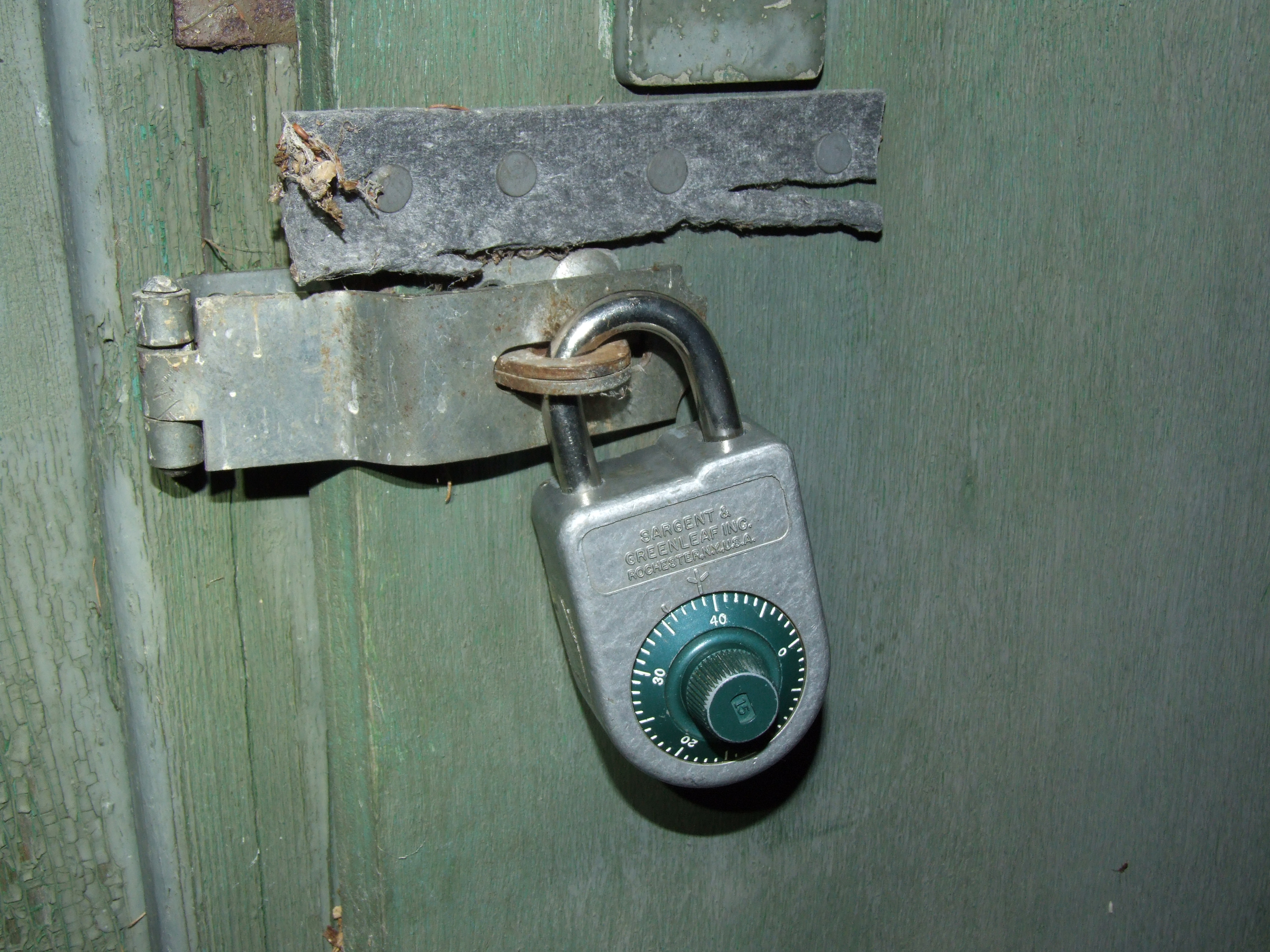
- Sargent & Greenleaf combination padlock
- Formerly: James Sargent Lock Company (1857-1864)
- Type: Subsidiary
- Founded: 1857; 169 years ago
- Founder: James Sargent
- Headquarters: Nicholasville, Kentucky, United States
- Parent: Stanley Security Solutions
- Website: sargentandgreenleaf.com

Sargent & Greenleaf, Inc., more commonly known among Safe and Vault technician circles as S&G, is a U.S. company that manufactures combination locks, key-operated safe and safe deposit box locks, high security military padlocks, and associated equipment.

== History ==
James Sargent founded the James Sargent Lock Company in 1857. In 1864, he moved to Rochester, New York and the company was later renamed Sargent & Greenleaf. Halbert S. Greenleaf, a former employer of Mr. Sargent, joined the firm as an equal partner in 1865.

The company relocated to Nicholasville, Kentucky in 1974, where it remains headquartered today. It is a subsidiary of Assa Abloy.
