= John M. Mossman Lock Museum =

Museum in Manhattan, New York

Coordinates: 40.75525°N 73.98136°W

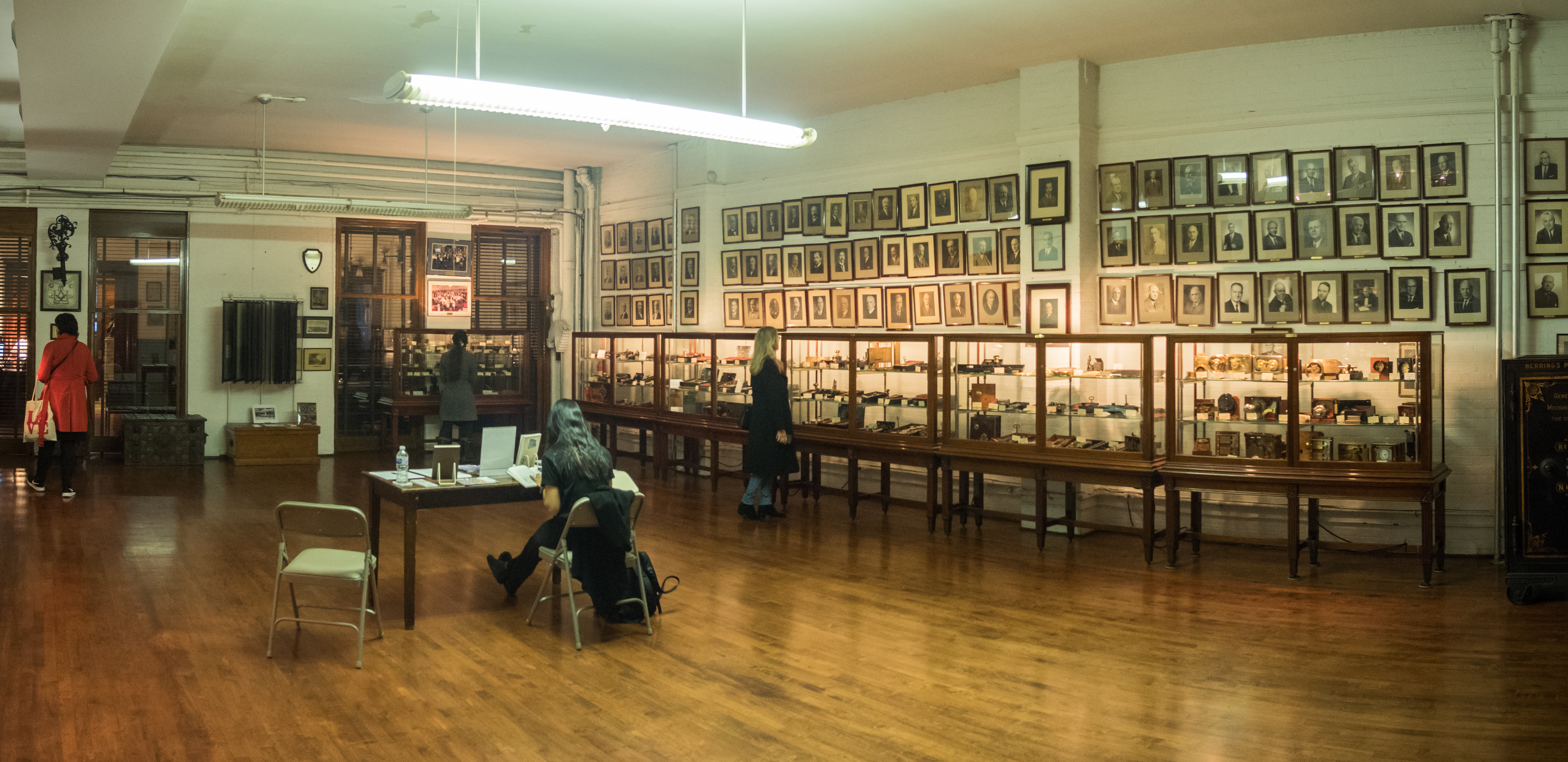
Mossman Lock Collection in 2019

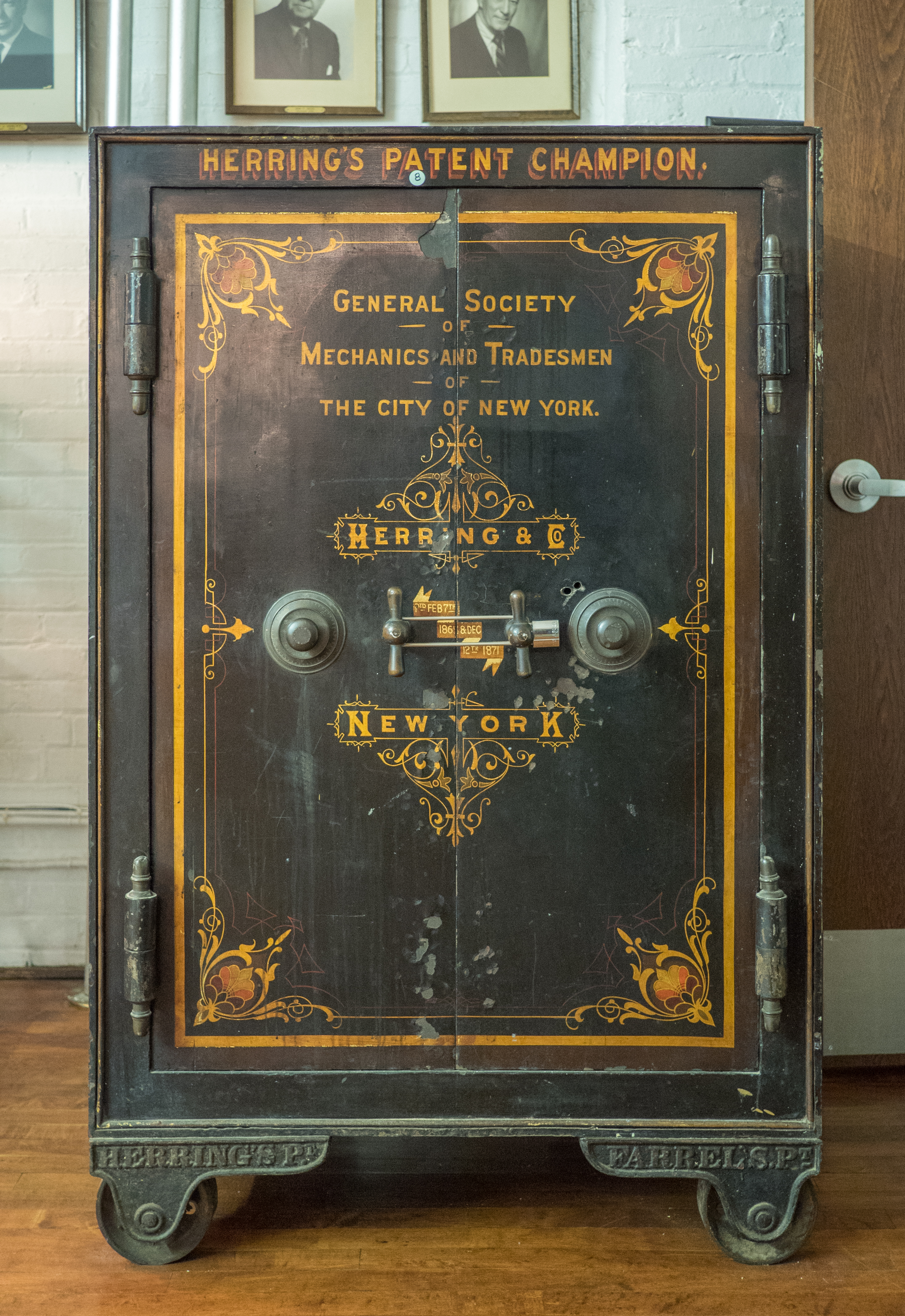
Large safe at the museum

The John M. Mossman Lock Collection is housed at the General Society of Mechanics and Tradesmen of the City of New York building at 20 West 44th Street in Midtown Manhattan, New York City. The museum houses one of the largest collections of bank and vault locks in the world, with more than 370 locks, keys and tools dating from 4000 BC to the modern 20th-century.

Egyptian wooden-pin locks, Chinese padlocks, American time locks, etc., are all displayed in lighted glass cases on the second floor of the General Society. Alongside the cases are studded trunks, with cleverly concealed keyholes, once used by bankers. Many of the examples are unique, made-to-order locks that were not produced in commercial quantities and nearly every lock has protected millions in money and securities.

To augment the lock collection. Mr. Mossman donated his notes and scrapbooks, known as the "Mossman Papers", which have proven to be a valuable resource for the study of locks. "The Lure of the Lock" was published in 1928 and describes each lock in the collection. This book, as well as a photo CD of the collection, are available from the Society.

Collections of various antebellum curios, rare books, prints, flags, clocks and medals have also been donated by friends and members. Admission is $10 for viewing this museum collection, which is open to the public.
