= Mosler Safe Company =

Defunct manufacturer of security equipment

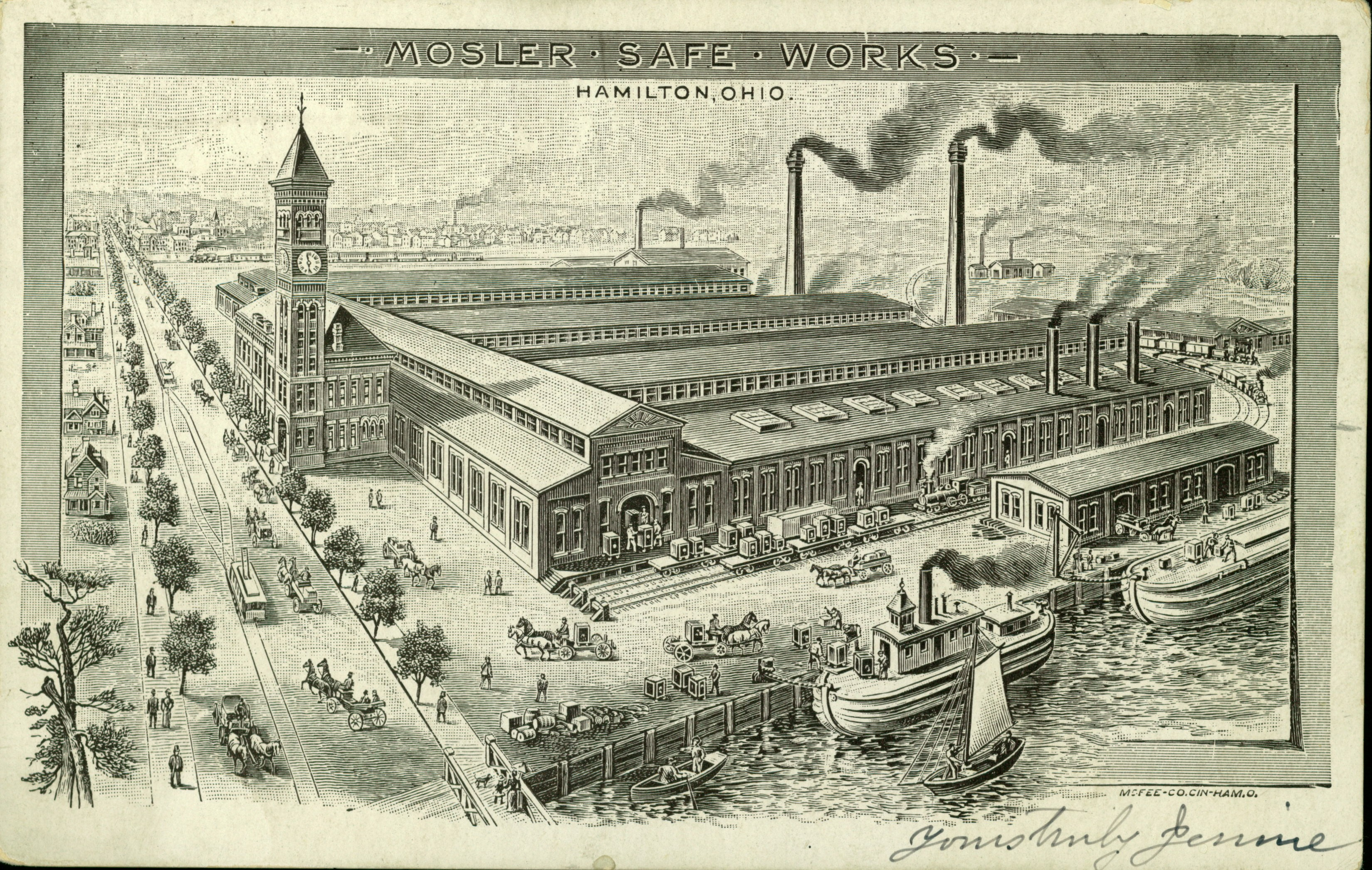
- The Mosler Safe Company factory, Hamilton, circa 1894.
- Formerly: Mosler Safe & Lock Company
- Industry: Security equipment manufacturing
- Predecessor: Mosler, Bahmann & Company
- Founded: 1874; 152 years ago
- Founders: Gustave Mosler; Fred Bahmann
- Defunct: 3 August 2001
- Fate: Bankrupted, acquired by Diebold Inc.
- Headquarters: Hamilton, Ohio, U.S.
- Website: mosler.com at the Wayback Machine (archived 2001-04-18)

The Mosler Safe Company was an American multinational manufacturer of security equipment specializing in safes and bank vaults. In 2001, the company was acquired by Diebold Inc. after going bankrupt.

== History ==
In 1867, Gustave Mosler and Fred Bahmann founded Mosler, Bahmann & Company in Cincinnati, Ohio. In 1874, after Gustave's death, the Mosler family had a falling out with Bahmann. The family left Mosler, Bahmann & Company to start the Mosler Safe & Lock Company. Both companies remained in Cincinnati until the 1890s. When Mosler Safe & Lock Co. outgrew its original factory in 1891, it relocated to Hamilton, where it remained until its bankruptcy. Mosler, Bahmann & Company remained in business until around 1898.

Mosler was controlled by its founding family until 1967, when they sold it to American Standard Companies. American Standard then sold the division to a group of Mosler managers and outside investors in 1986.

After 134 years in business, Mosler filed Chapter 11 bankruptcy in August 2001, citing continuing debt problems, and ceased operations shortly thereafter. Diebold subsequently announced programs to support former Mosler customers and bought most of the original company in bankruptcy court a few months later.

== Products ==
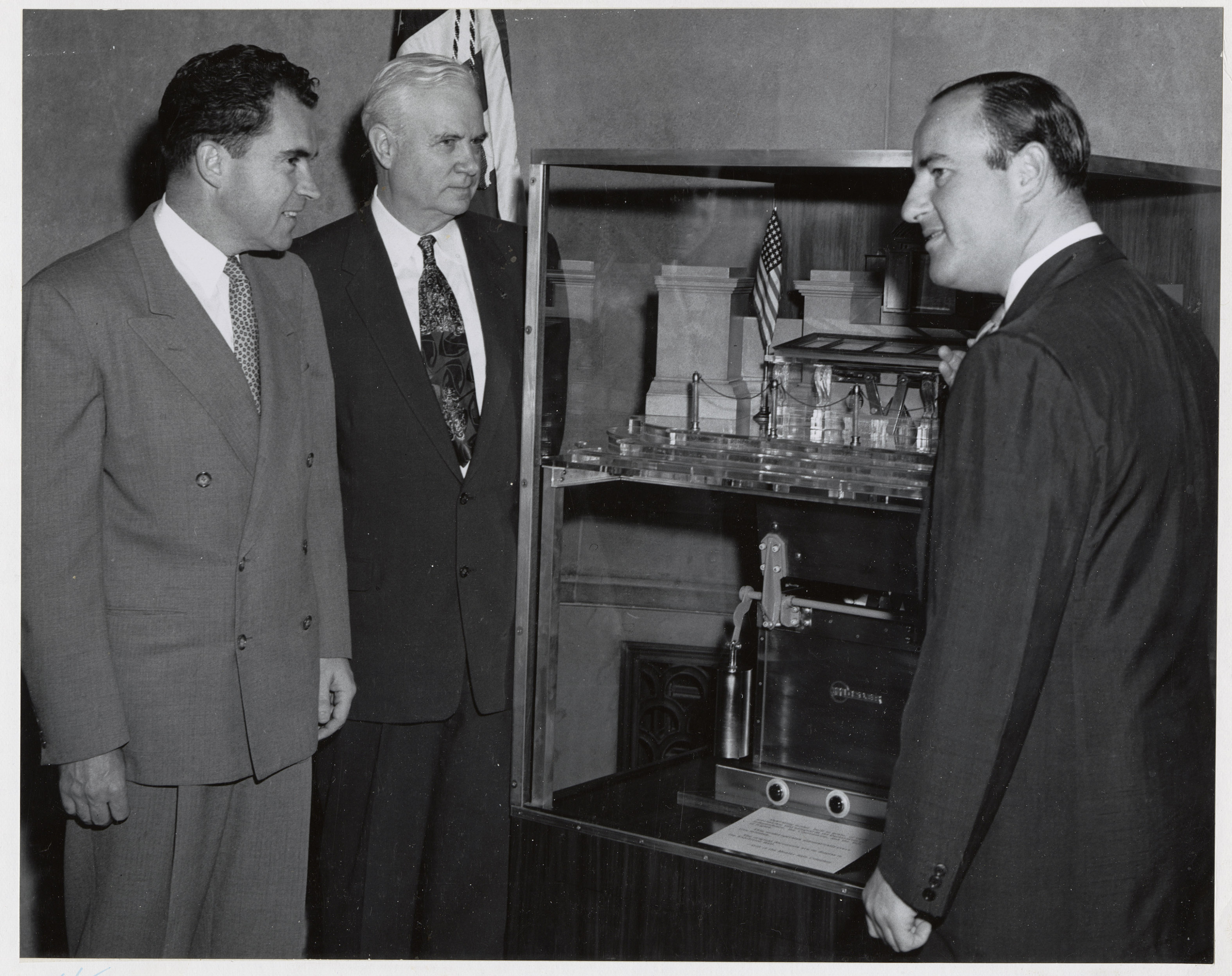
CEO William Mosler (right) presenting a model of the shrine to Vice President Richard Nixon and Ohio Senator John W. Bricker (left)

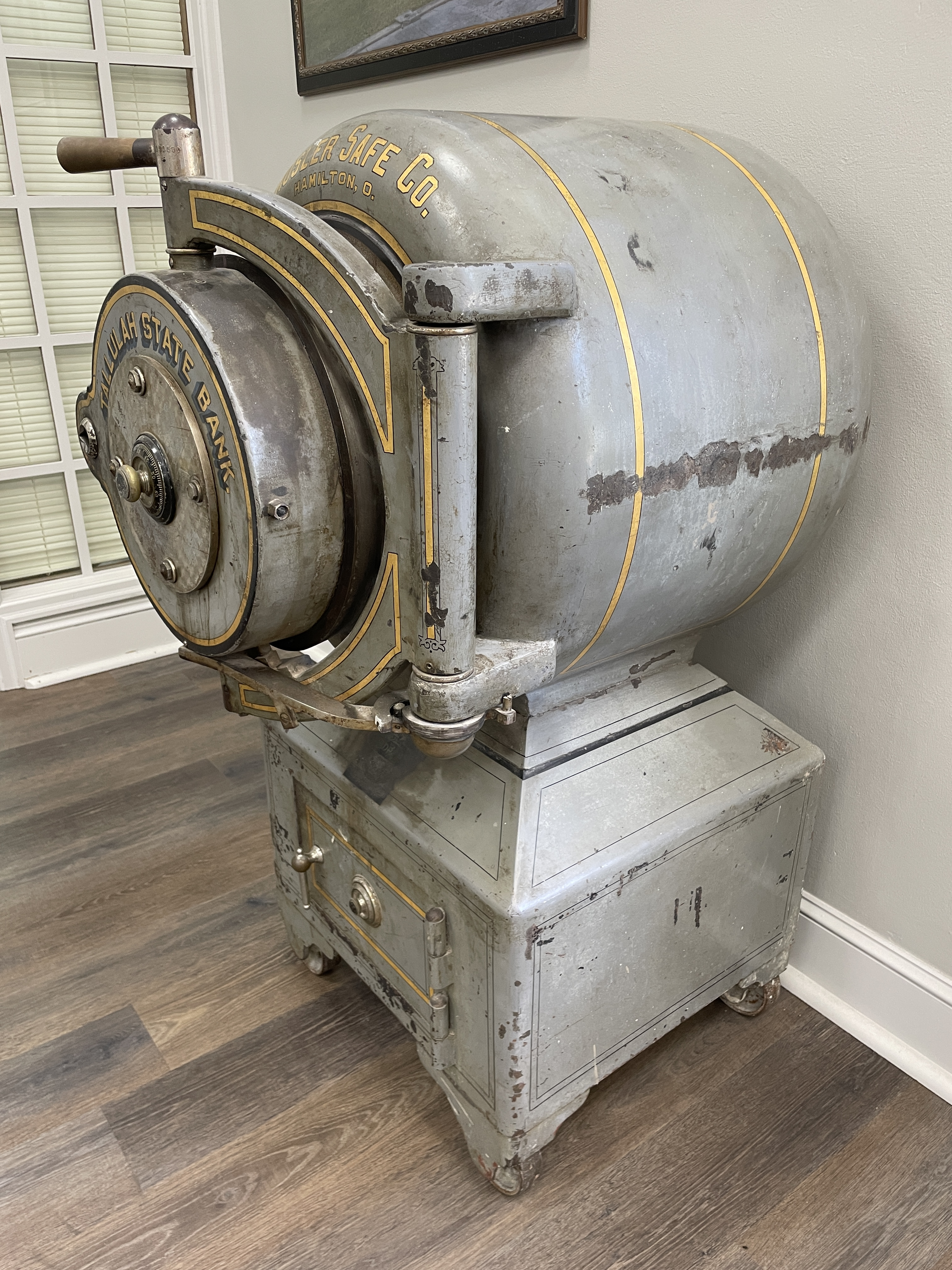
A Mosler safe in Tallulah, Louisiana.

Mosler's safes and vaults were renowned for their strength and precise manufacturing. Several Mosler vaults installed in Hiroshima's Mitsui Bank building prior to WWII survived the nuclear attack, a fact the company widely publicized in its marketing. Mosler safes were also used by the U.S. government in its Manhattan Project, although physicist Richard Feynman had a hobby of cracking them.

When the U.S. government began building bunkers and silos during the Cold War, Mosler became the contractor for blast doors. One set, installed at the Atomic Energy Commission's Oak Ridge National Laboratory in 1961, weighed approximately 65 tons per door, and were considered the heaviest doors installed in the United States at their time of construction.

Mosler built the vault formerly used to display and store the Charters of Freedom: the US Constitution, Declaration of Independence, and the Bill of Rights. Mosler also built the gold vaults for the United States Bullion Depository at Fort Knox. Despite the weight, each 58-ton blade could be opened and closed manually by one person.
