= Old Federal Reserve Bank Building (Philadelphia) =

- Old Federal Reserve Bank
- U.S. National Register of Historic Places
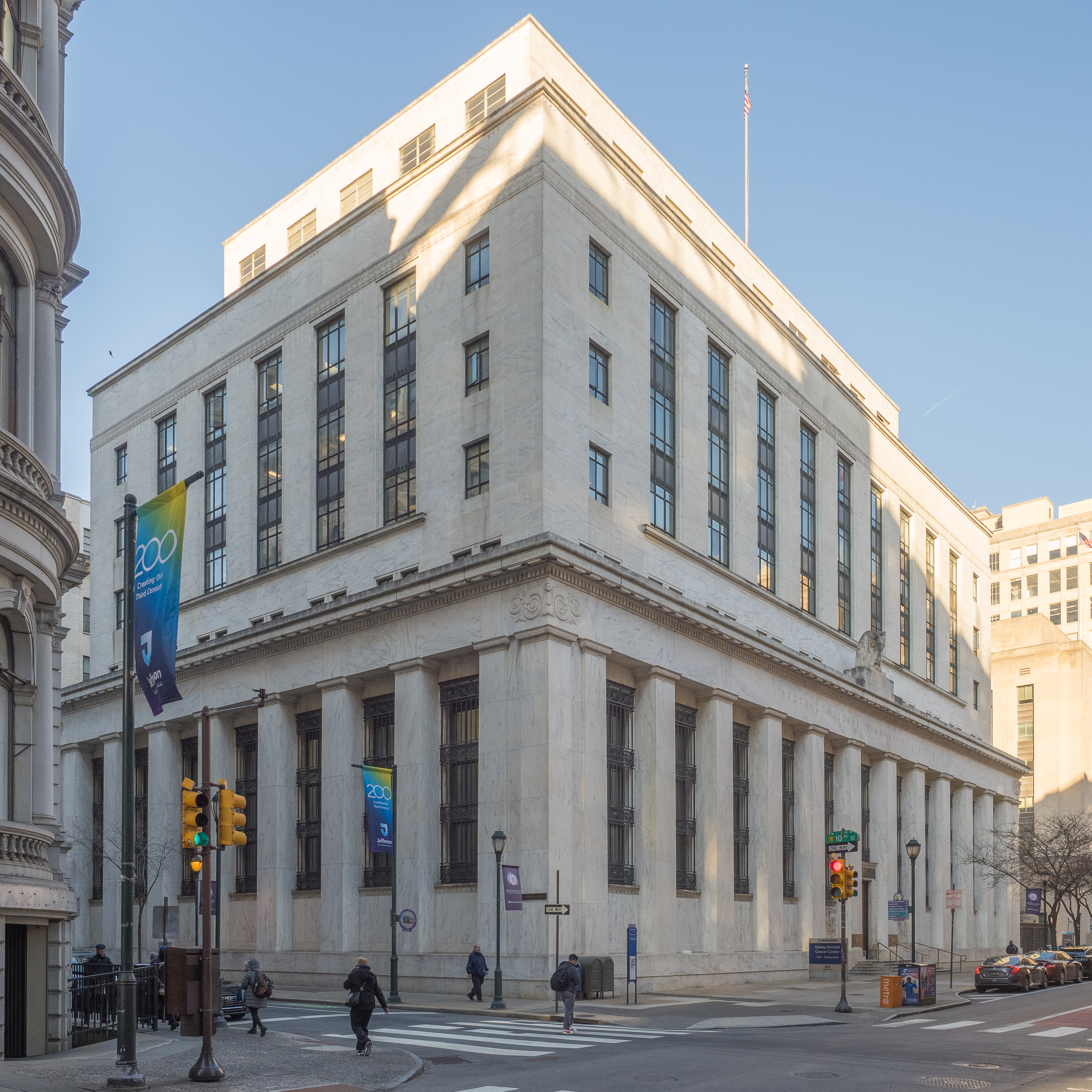
- (2024)

- Location within Philadelphia Location within Pennsylvania Location within the United States
- Location: 925 Chestnut Street; Philadelphia, Pennsylvania
- Coordinates: 39°57′0″N 75°9′26″W
- Built: 1933
- Architect: Paul Philippe Cret, Harbeson, Hough, Livingston & Larson
- Architectural style: Classical Revival
- NRHP reference No.: 79002325
- Added to NRHP: June 28, 1979

The Old Federal Reserve Bank Building is an historic bank building that is located at 925 Chestnut Street, in the Market East neighborhood of Philadelphia, Pennsylvania, United States.

It was added to the National Register of Historic Places in 1979.

== History and architectural features ==
The main section of this building, which was designed by architect Paul Philippe Cret in the Classical Revival style with influences of the Beaux-Arts style, was built between 1931 and 1935. It incorporated the Penn Mutual Life Insurance Building, that was erected in 1889, with additions made in 1918 and 1925. Cret also designed the formal gardens, which were added in 1941. The bank vault was designed by Frederick S. Holmes.

Between 1952 and 1953, a recessed seventh story was added. It was designed by Harbeson, Hough, Livingston & Larson, the successor firm to Cret.

The building, which features sculptures of the goddess Athena that were created by Alfred-Alphonse Bottiau, is eleven bays wide and measures 170 feet wide and 113 feet deep. It has a steel-frame structure that is faced with Vermont marble and has engaged piers.

It was added to the National Register of Historic Places in 1979. It is located on the East Center City Commercial Historic District. The building is now part of the Center City campus of the Thomas Jefferson University Hospital, housing both administrative space and clinical facilities.

== Gallery ==
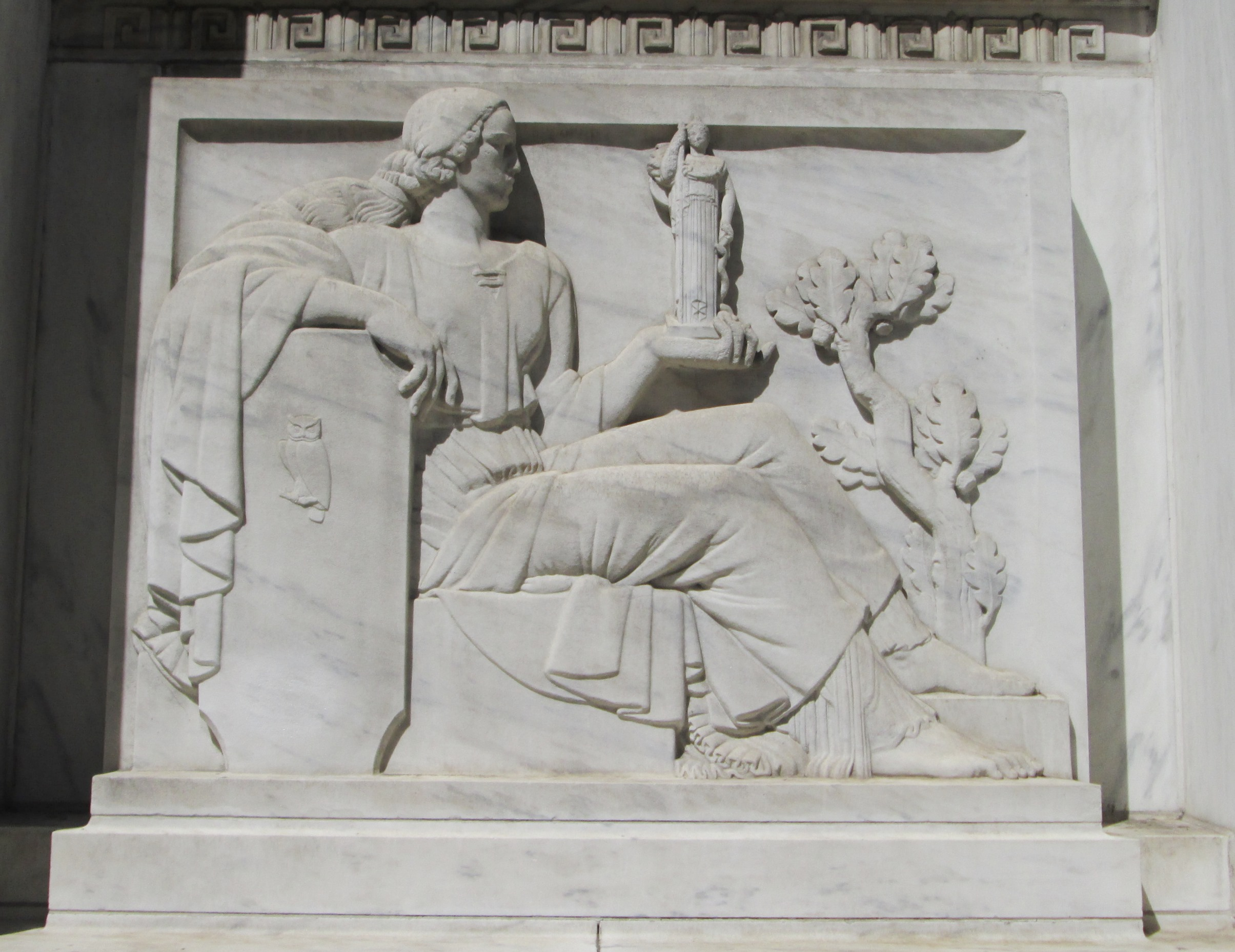
Bottiau's sculpture on the west side of the main entrance

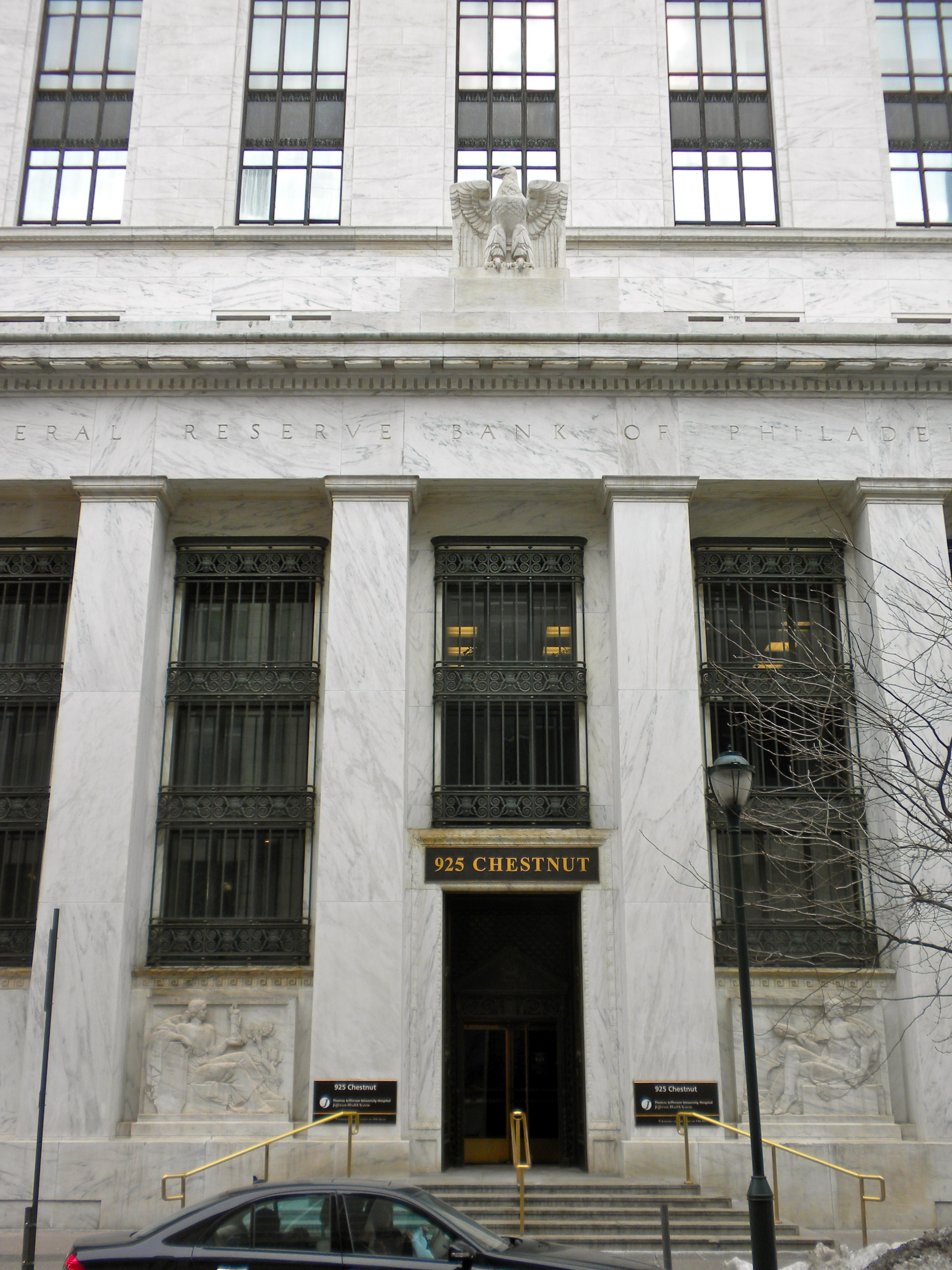
The center of the Chestnut Street facade

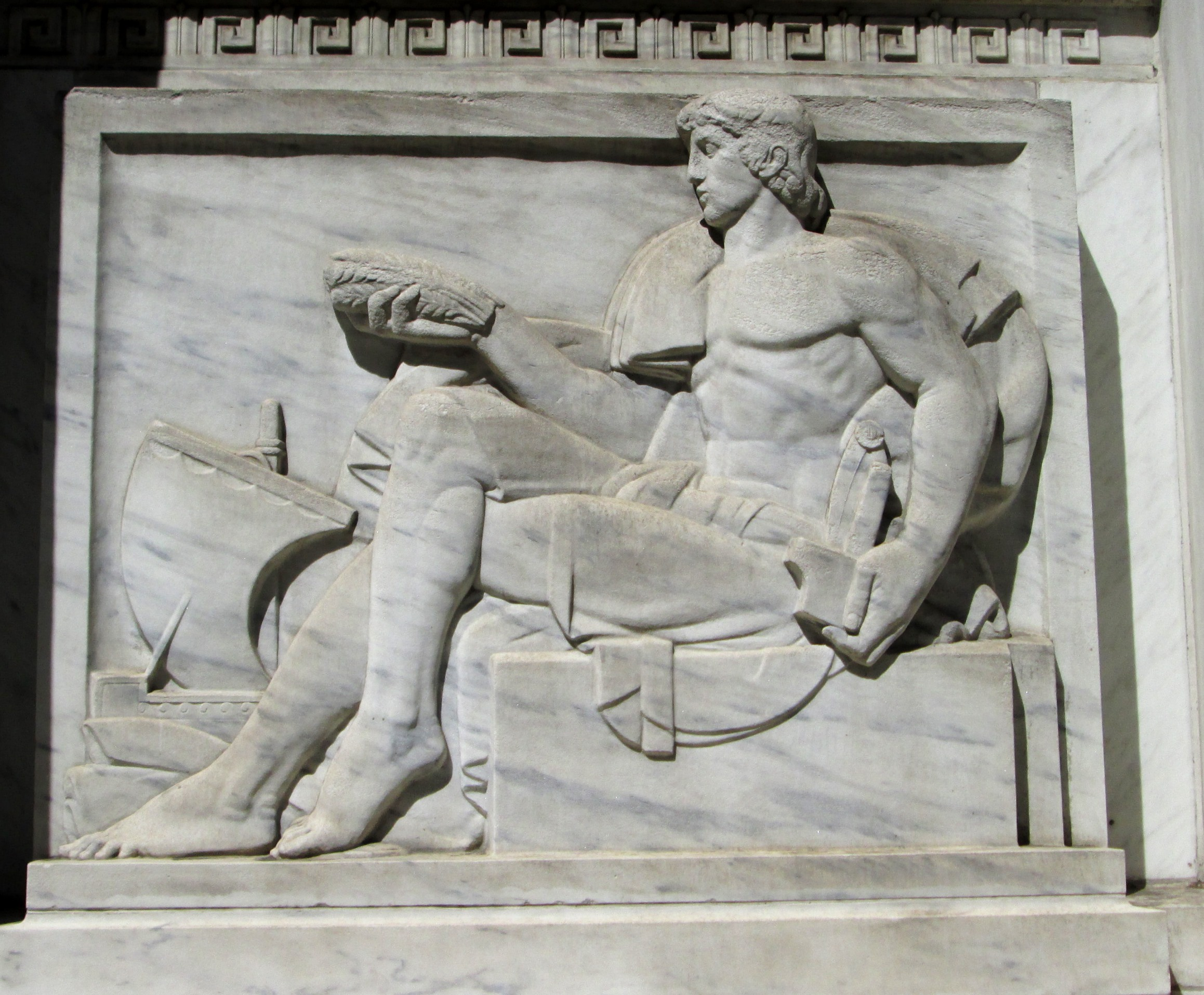
Bottiau's sculpture on the east side of the main entrance
