= Wilson Eyre =

American architect

Wilson Eyre Jr.
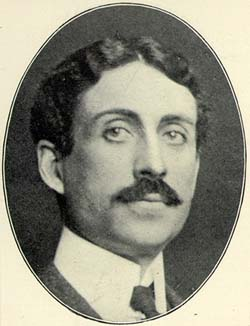
- A 1901 illustration of Eyre
- Born: October 30, 1858; Florence, Italy
- Died: October 23, 1944 (aged 85); Philadelphia, Pennsylvania, U.S.
- Occupation: Architect
- Buildings: Charles Lang Freer House University of Pennsylvania Museum (with Frank Miles Day and Cope and Stewardson) Swann Memorial Fountain (Eyre & McIlvaine, architects; Alexander Stirling Calder, sculptor)

Wilson Eyre Jr. (October 30, 1858 – October 23, 1944) was an American architect, teacher and writer who practiced in the Philadelphia area. He is known for his deliberately informal and welcoming country houses, and for being an innovator in the Shingle Style.

== Early life and education ==
Eyre was born in Florence, Italy, the son of Americans living abroad. He was educated in Europe, Newport, Rhode Island, and Canada, and he studied architecture briefly at the Massachusetts Institute of Technology in Cambridge, Massachusetts.

== Career ==
In 1877, he joined the offices of James Peacock Sims in Philadelphia, and took over the firm following Sims's death in 1882.

In 1911, he entered into partnership with John Gilbert McIlvaine, and opened a second office in New York City. The firm, Eyre & McIlvaine. continued until 1939.

For his most important early houses, "Anglecot" (1883) and "Farwood" (1884–85), he used a simple plan: a line of asymmetrical public rooms stretching along a single axis, extending even outside to a piazza. Like many Shingle Style architects, he employed the open living hall as an organizing element: all of the main first floor rooms connecting to the hall, often through large openings. He used staircases to extend the space of the hall to the second floor.

According to architectural-historian Vincent Scully, "This sense of extended horizontal plane and intensified positive scale evident in Eyre's work becomes later a basic component in the work of [Frank Lloyd] Wright..." Eyre collaborated with artists such as Alexander Stirling Calder and Louis Comfort Tiffany.

Eyre emerged as a leader in the international country life movement, lecturing in England, and corresponding with British and German architects. He was one of the first U.S. architects to be featured in the Arts & Crafts magazine International Studio, and he was published by Hermann Muthesius, the chronicler of the so-called "English" house of the turn of the century.

Prior to Frank Lloyd Wright's rise to prominence, Eyre was arguably the best-known domestic architect in the U.S. among foreign designers. His post-1890 country houses, such as "Allgates" (1910, expanded by Eyre & McIlvaine 1917) are among the most accomplished American essays in the restrained stucco cottage idiom popularized by C.F.A. Voysey and Ernest Newton in England.

He was one of the founders and editors of House & Garden magazine. He designed many distinctive gardens with his residences, and wrote extensively of the need for interaction between rooms and outdoor spaces. Later house plans often featured loggias, terraces and porches connected to each major room on the ground floor to maximize the experience of the garden from inside the house.

Eyre was also renowned for his distinctive artistic drawings, often in watercolor. He used charcoal, pencil and ink with equal facility, and drew bird's eye perspectives with amazing speed. His extant drawings are now housed in the Architectural Archives at the University of Pennsylvania. He was elected a Fellow of the American Institute of Architects in 1893.

In August 1914, he was stranded in Europe along with thousands of Americans attempting to escape World War I. Eyre returned to the United States in late September and shared a cabin with Augustus P. Gardner, a member of the House of Representatives from Massachusetts.

In 1917, he was awarded the Gold Medal of the Philadelphia Chapter of the American Institute of Architects. He taught at the University of Pennsylvania, and was one of the founders of the T Square Club of Philadelphia in 1883. In 1910, he was elected into the National Academy of Design as an associate academician.

== Personal life ==
Eyre was one of the few Philadelphia architects who made no attempt to hide his homosexuality, which likely diminished his influence in later years.

== Death ==
He died in Philadelphia and is interred at The Woodlands Cemetery.

== Selected works ==
=== Philadelphia area ===
==== Residences ====
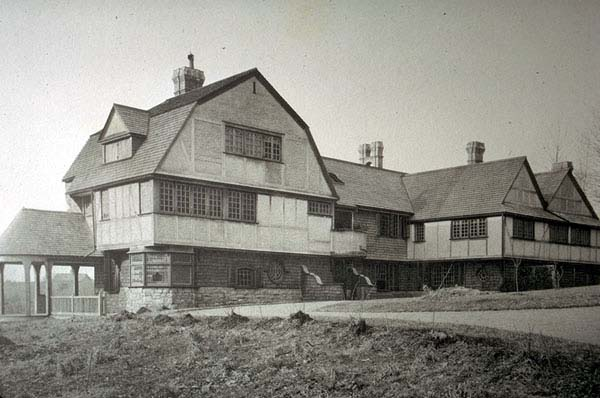
"Farwood", also known as the Richard L. Ashhurst house, in the Overbrook Park section of Philadelphia, (1884–85, demolished)

- “Mauchline”, also known as the Frank Gifford Tallman house, in Wilmington, Delaware

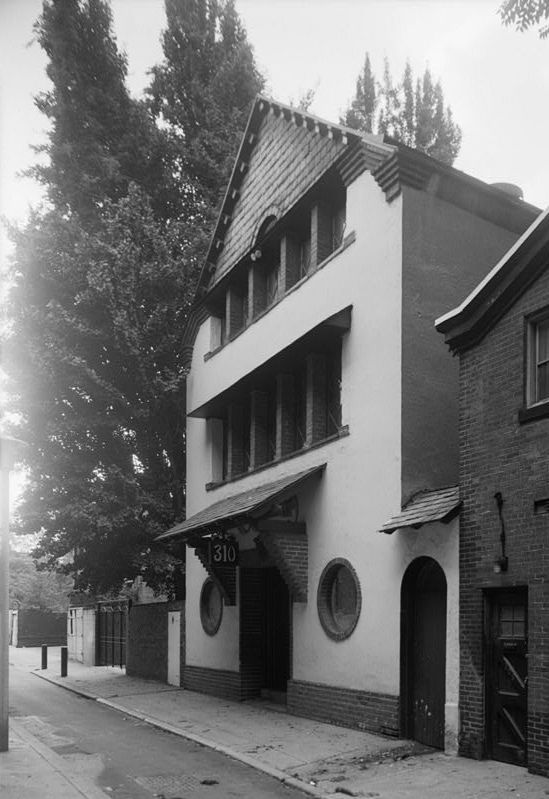
Mask & Wig Clubhouse, 310 S. Quince St., Philadelphia, PA (1894, altered by Eyre 1901)

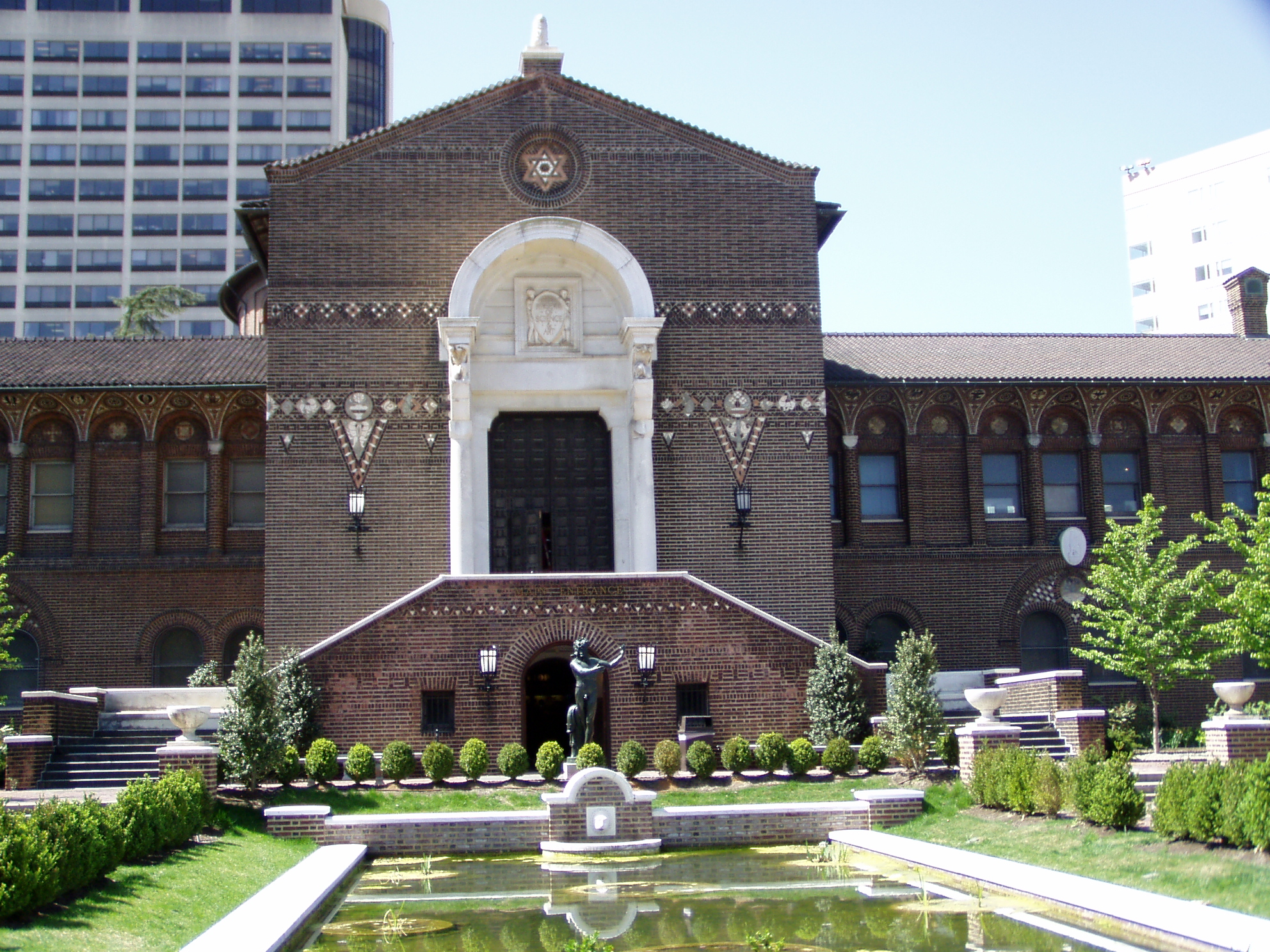
University of Pennsylvania Museum of Archaeology and Anthropology, 3260 South St., Philadelphia, PA (1895–99), Wilson Eyre, Frank Miles Day, and Cope & Stewardson, architects

- "Anglecot" (Charles Adams Potter house), 401 E. Evergreen Avenue, Chestnut Hill, Philadelphia, Pennsylvania (1883). Added to the National Register of Historic Places in 1982
- "Farwood" (Richard L. Ashurst house), Overbrook, Pennsylvania (1884–85, demolished).
- 220 Glenn road, Ardmore, PA, 19003
- "Wisteria" (Charles A. Newhall house), 444 W. Chestnut Hill Avenue, Chestnut Hill, Philadelphia, Pennsylvania (1884–85)
- Dr. Henry Genet Taylor House and Office, 305 Cooper Street, Camden, New Jersey (1884–86). As of January 2015, renovation was underway by Rutgers University–Camden to convert the building into a Writers House.
- Harriet D. Schaeffer house, 433 W. Stafford Street, Philadelphia, Pennsylvania (1888)
- "Teviot", 399 East Willow Grove Avenue, Chestnut Hill, Philadelphia, Pennsylvania (1888).
- Sally Watson House, 5128 Wayne Ave., Philadelphia, Pennsylvania (1889)
- Clarence B. Moore House, 1321 Locust Street, Philadelphia, Pennsylvania (1890).
- Henry Cochran house, 3511 Baring Street, Philadelphia, Pennsylvania (1891)
- Neill-Mauran House, 22nd & Delancey Streets, Philadelphia, Pennsylvania (1891)
- Dr. Joseph Leidy House and office, 1319 Locust Street, Philadelphia, Pennsylvania (1894).
- Mrs. Evan Randolph house, 218 W. Chestnut Hill Avenue, Chestnut Hill, Philadelphia, Pennsylvania (1906)
- Clover Hill Farm, 910 Penn Valley Rd Media, Pennsylvania (1907)
- "Lycoming," The Residence of William Jay Turner, 3005 W. School House Lane, Philadelphia, PA, (1907). A Philadelphia Register of Historic Places nomination for this property, authored by Oscar Beisert, Architectural Historian and Historic Preservationist, was filed on October 29, 2018, by the Keeping Society of Philadelphia. A demolition permit was filed by the property owner the same day and the building was demolished soon afterwards for an athletic field.
- Alterations to Wilson Eyre House, 1003-05 Spruce Street, Philadelphia, Pennsylvania (1909–1910). It was added to the National Register of Historic Places in 1977.
- "Allgates" (Horatio Gates Lloyd mansion), Coopertown Road, Haverford, Pennsylvania (1910, expanded by Eyre & McIlvaine 1917). Added to the National Register of Historic Places in 1979.
- Additions to "Bel Orme" (Thomas Mott house), Matson Ford & County Line Roads, Radnor, Pennsylvania (Eyre & McIlvaine) (1917).

==== Other buildings ====
- Mask & Wig Clubhouse, 310 Quince Street, Philadelphia, Pennsylvania (1894, altered by Eyre 1901). Murals by Maxfield Parrish. Added to the National Register of Historic Places in 1979.
- University of Pennsylvania Museum, 3260 Spruce Street, Philadelphia, Pennsylvania (with Frank Miles Day and Cope & Stewardson) (1895–99).
- Corn Exchange Bank, Northeast corner 2nd & Chestnut Streets, Philadelphia, Pennsylvania (1896).
- Carnegie Library, McPherson Square, 601 E. Indiana Avenue, Philadelphia, Pennsylvania (Eyre & McIlvaine) (1915–17)
- Swann Memorial Fountain, Logan Circle, Philadelphia, Pennsylvania (Eyre & McIlvaine, architects; Alexander Stirling Calder, sculptor) (1921–24).
- The St. Anthony Club of Philadelphia. 32 South 22nd Street, Philadelphia, Pennsylvania. 1888.

=== Other regions ===
==== Residences ====
- Charles Lang Freer House, 71 E. Ferry Street, Detroit, Michigan (1890). Eyre altered the carriage house in 1906, to install The Peacock Room by James McNeill Whistler (now in the Freer Gallery, Washington, DC). Added to the National Register of Historic Places in 1971.
- Nathan Franklin Barrett house, "26, The Boulevard", Rochelle Park, New Rochelle, New York (1890). Barrett was the landscape architect and planner of the Rochelle Park community.
- "Greyeres" (Ernest Albert mansion), 9 Manhattan Avenue, Rochelle Park, New Rochelle, New York (1896, demolished)
- "Meadowcroft" (Theodore E. Conklin mansion), Southampton, New York on Long Island, New York (1904) Lighting by Louis Comfort Tiffany.
- E.S. Sands mansion, Southport, Connecticut (1905)
- "Etowah" (George W. King house), 429 Mt. Vernon Ave, Marion, Ohio (1908). Added to the National Register of Historic Places in 1995.
- "Northcote" (Stephen Parrish house), Lang Road, Cornish, New Hampshire (1893) Located near the Cornish Art Colony, this became the home/studio of the client's son, the painter Maxfield Parrish

==== Other buildings ====
- Detroit Club, 712 Cass Avenue, Detroit, Michigan (1891). Added to the National Register of Historic Places in 2005.
- Newcomb College Memorial Chapel, 6th & Chestnut Streets, New Orleans, Louisiana (1894–95, demolished 1954). Stained glass by Louis Comfort Tiffany.

== Image gallery ==
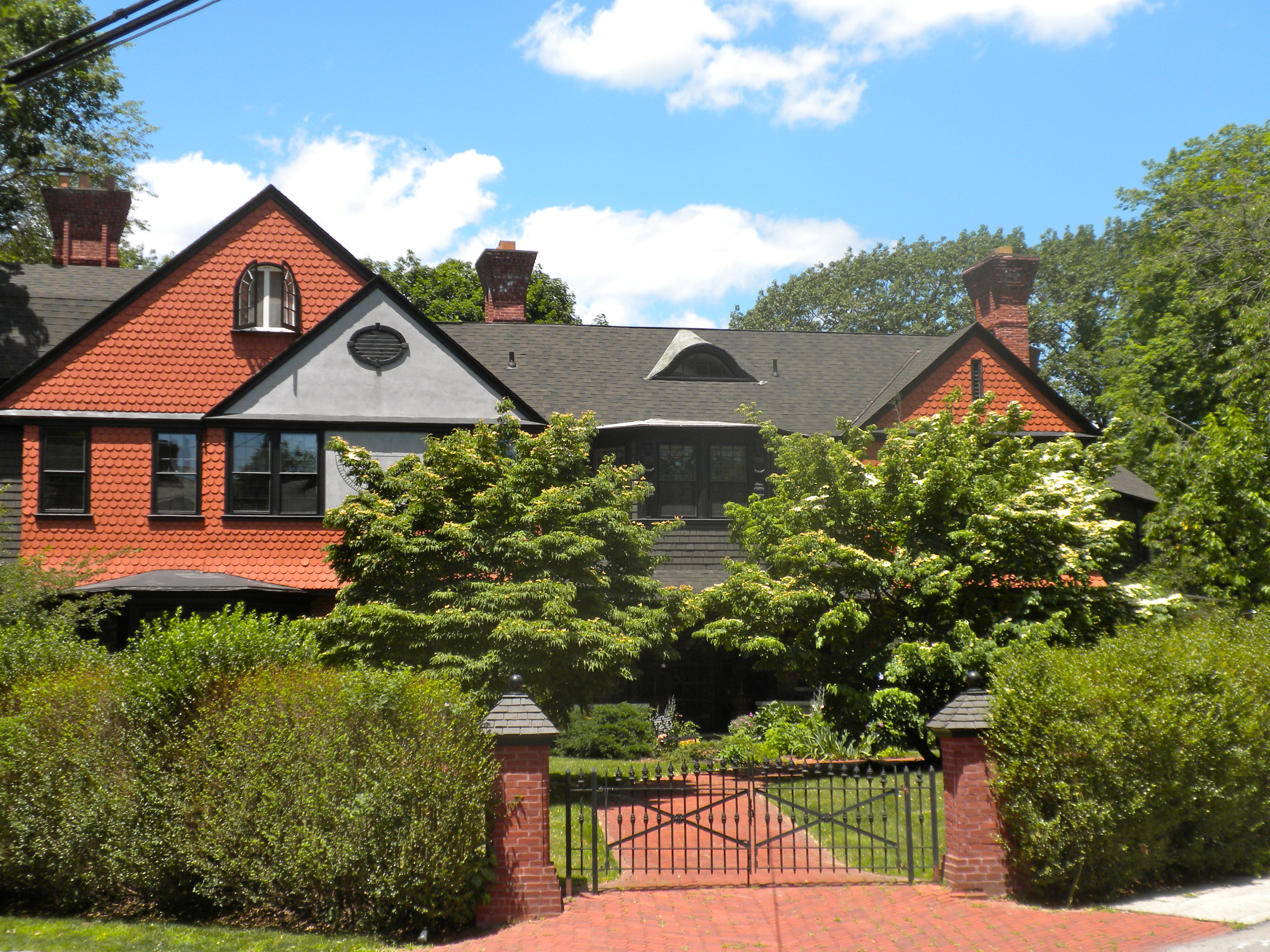
"Anglecot" (Charles Adams Potter house), 401 E. Evergreen Ave., Chestnut Hill section of Philadelphia (1883)

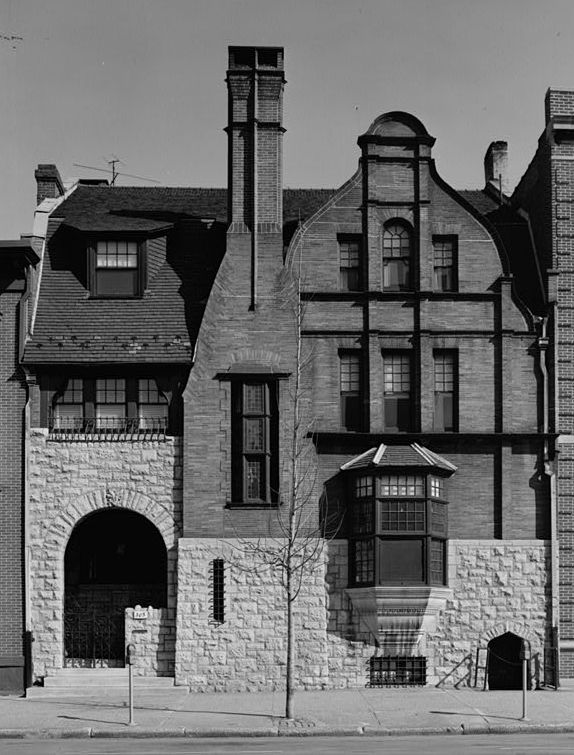
Dr. Henry Genet Taylor House and Office, 305 Cooper St., Camden, New Jersey (1884–86).

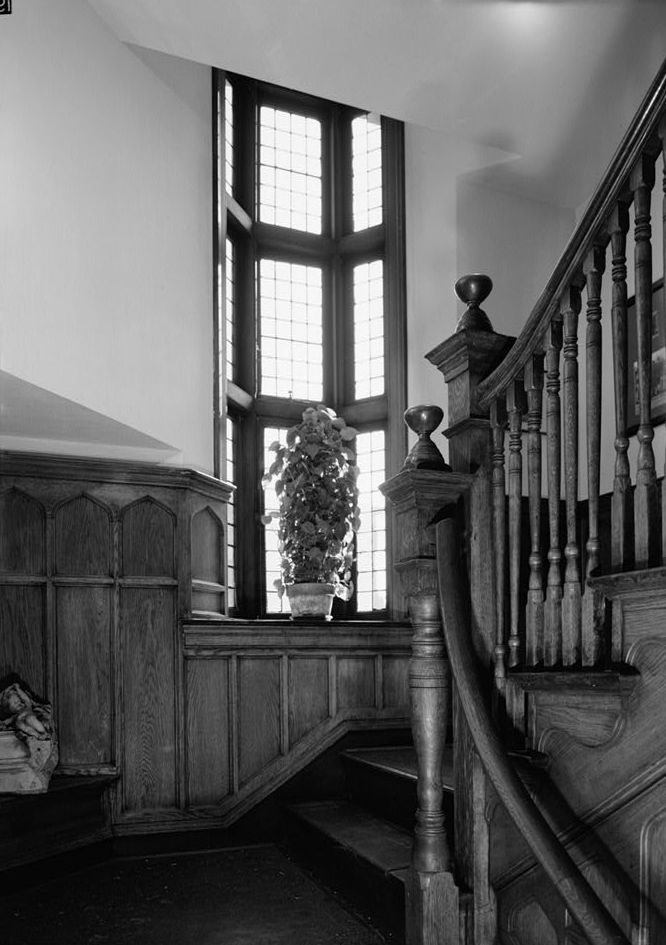
Interior of Taylor house (1884–86).

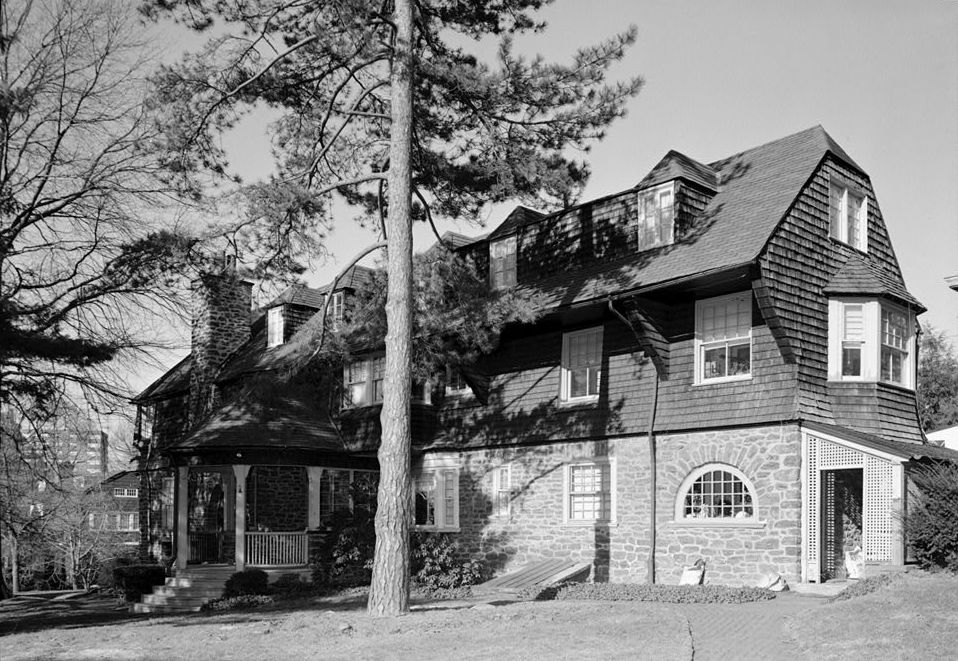
Harriet D. Schaeffer house, 433 W. Stafford St., Philadelphia (1888).

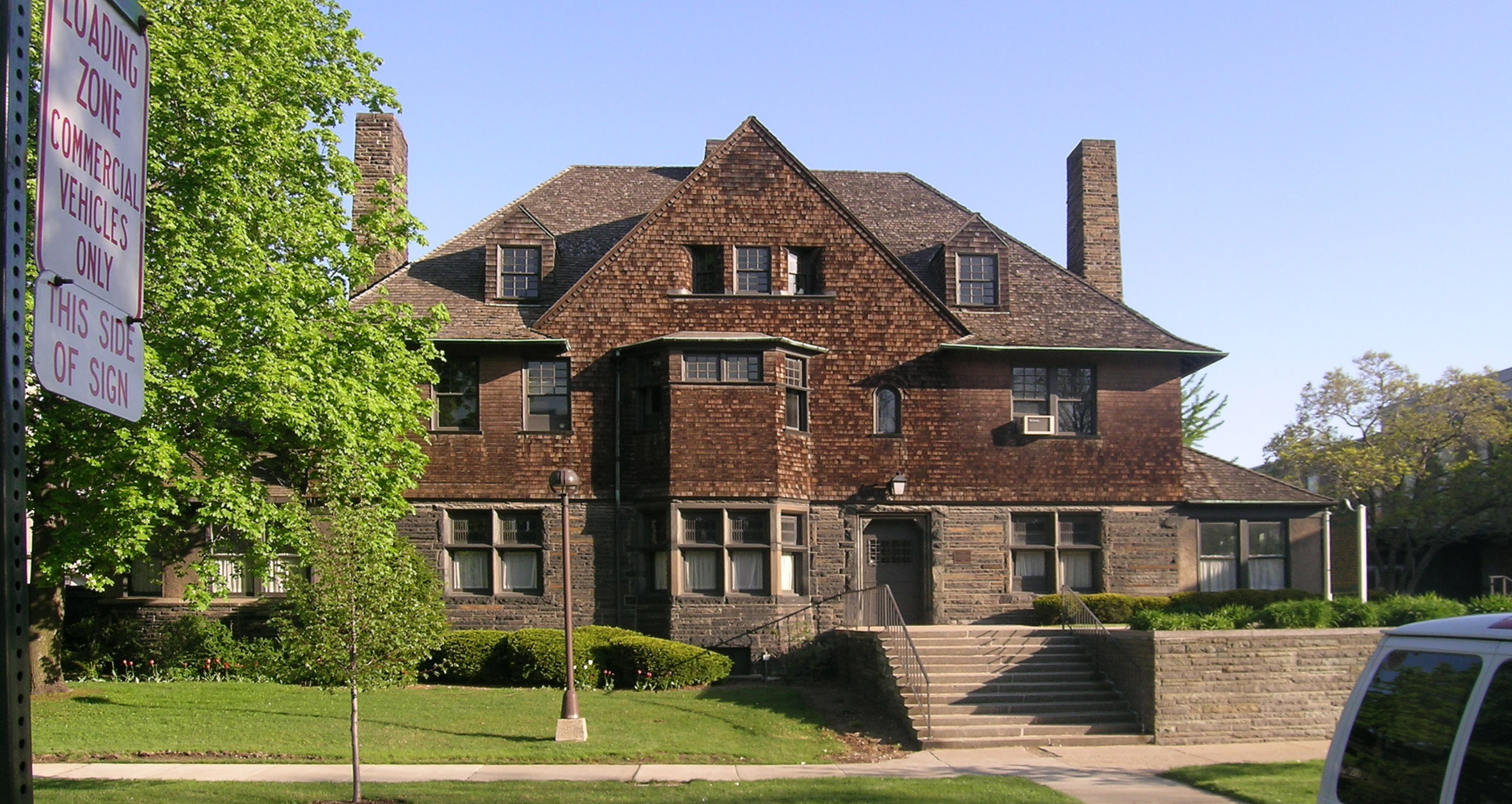
Charles Lang Freer House, 71 E. Ferry St., Detroit, MI (1890).

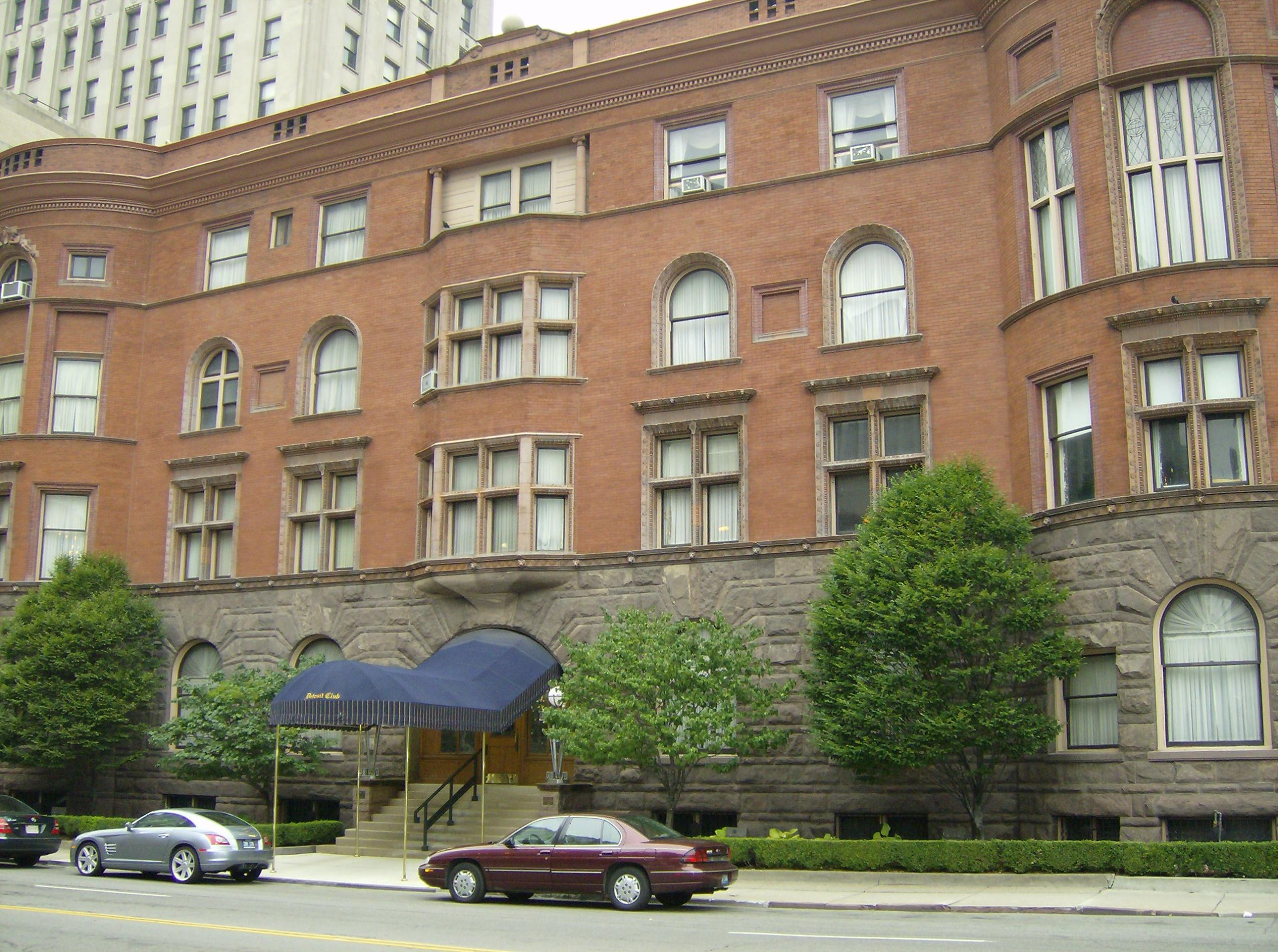
Detroit Club, 712 Cass Ave., Detroit, MI (1891).

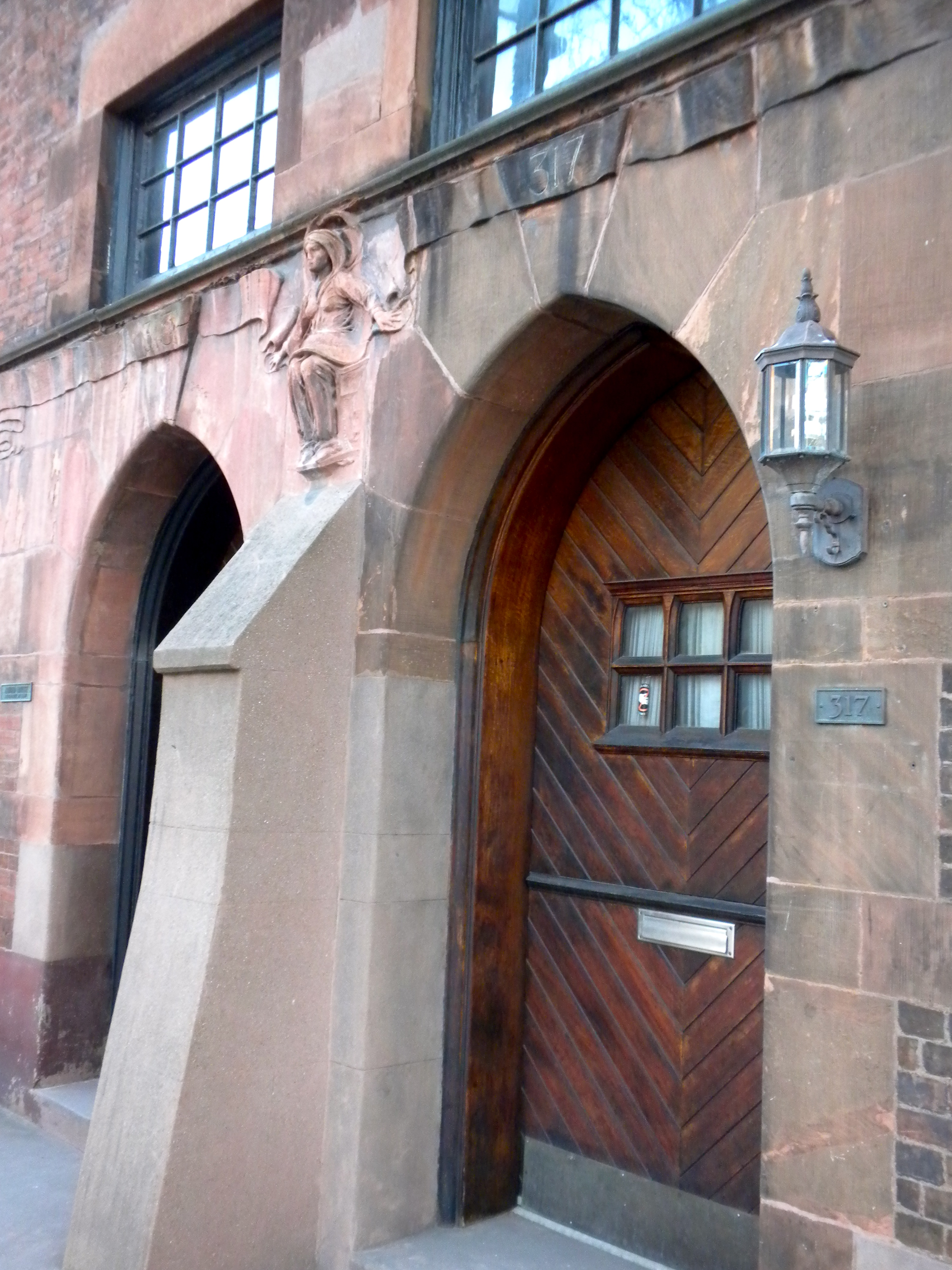
Doorways to Neill & Mauran Houses, 22nd & Delancey Sts., Philadelphia (1891).

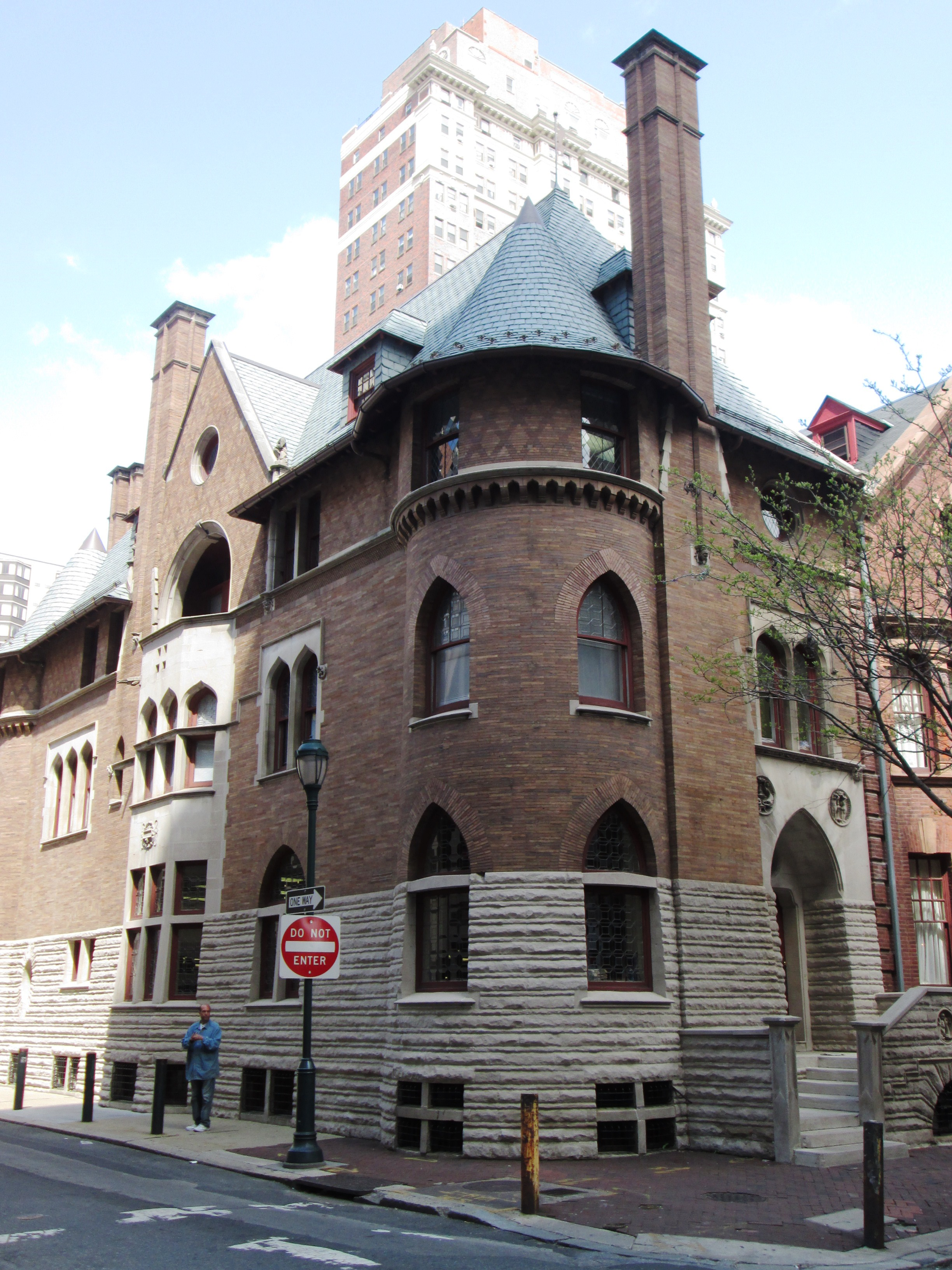
Clarence Bloomfield Moore House, 1321 Locust St., Philadelphia (1890). Eyre's Leidy House is next door (right).

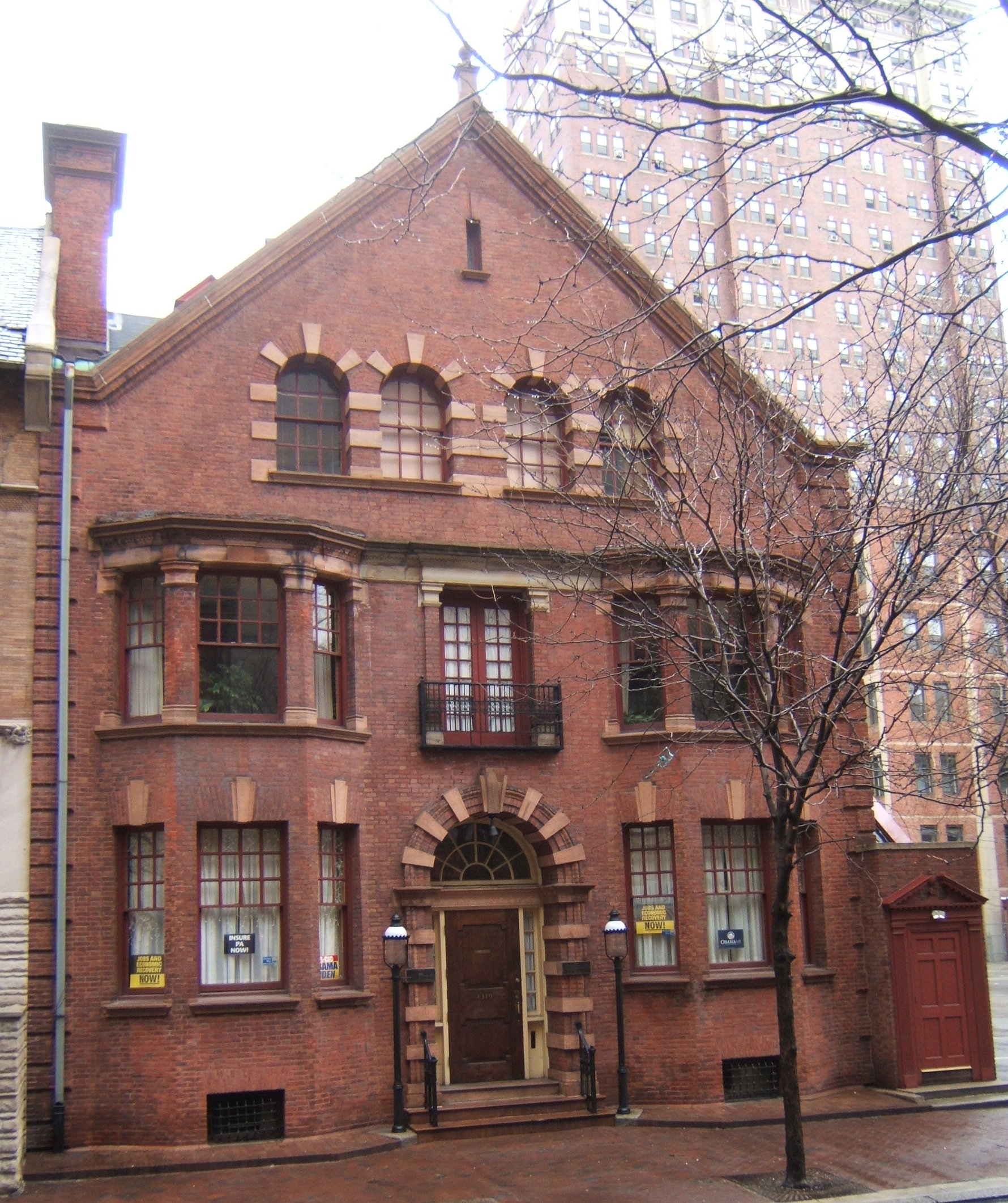
Dr. Joseph Leidy Jr. House & Office, 1319 Locust St., Philadelphia (1894).

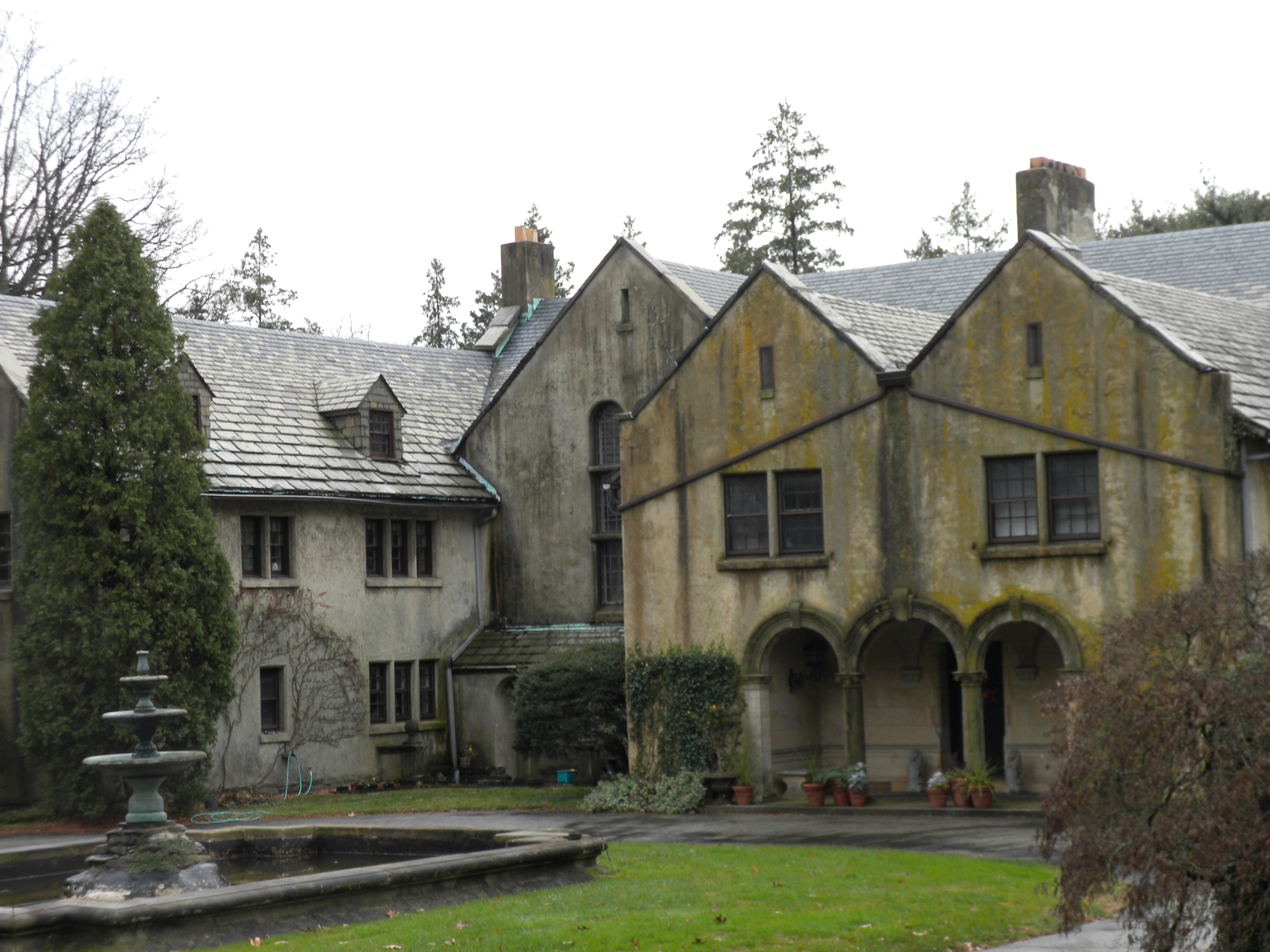
Allgates (Horatio Gates Lloyd mansion), Haverford, Pennsylvania (1910, altered by Eyre & McIlvaine 1917).

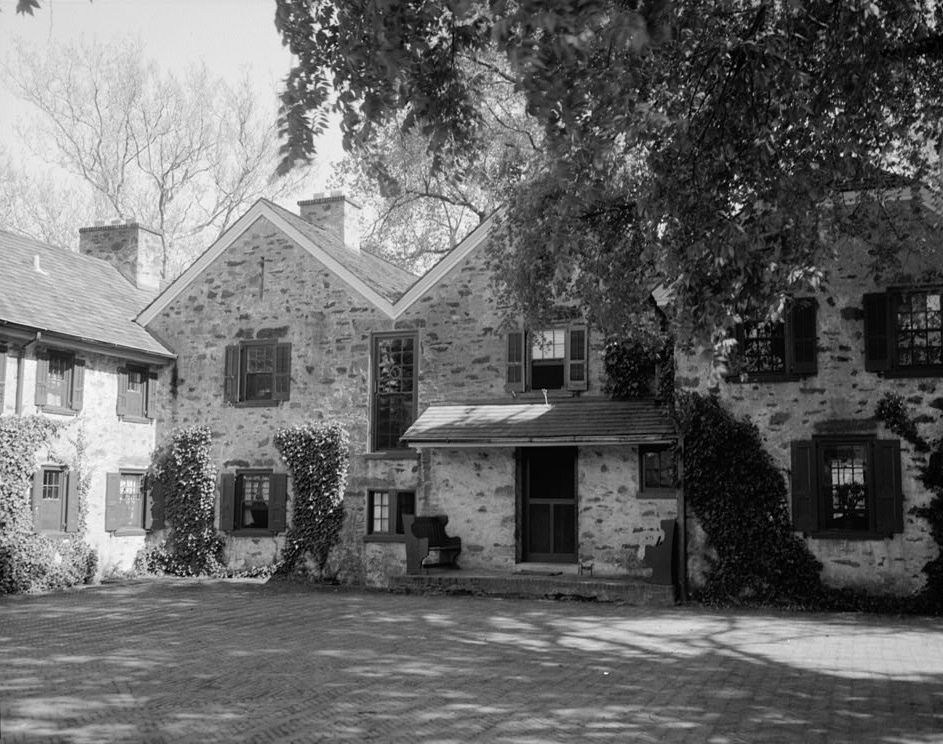
"Bel Orme" (Thomas Mott house), Radnor, Pennsylvania (altered by Eyre & McIlvaine 1917).

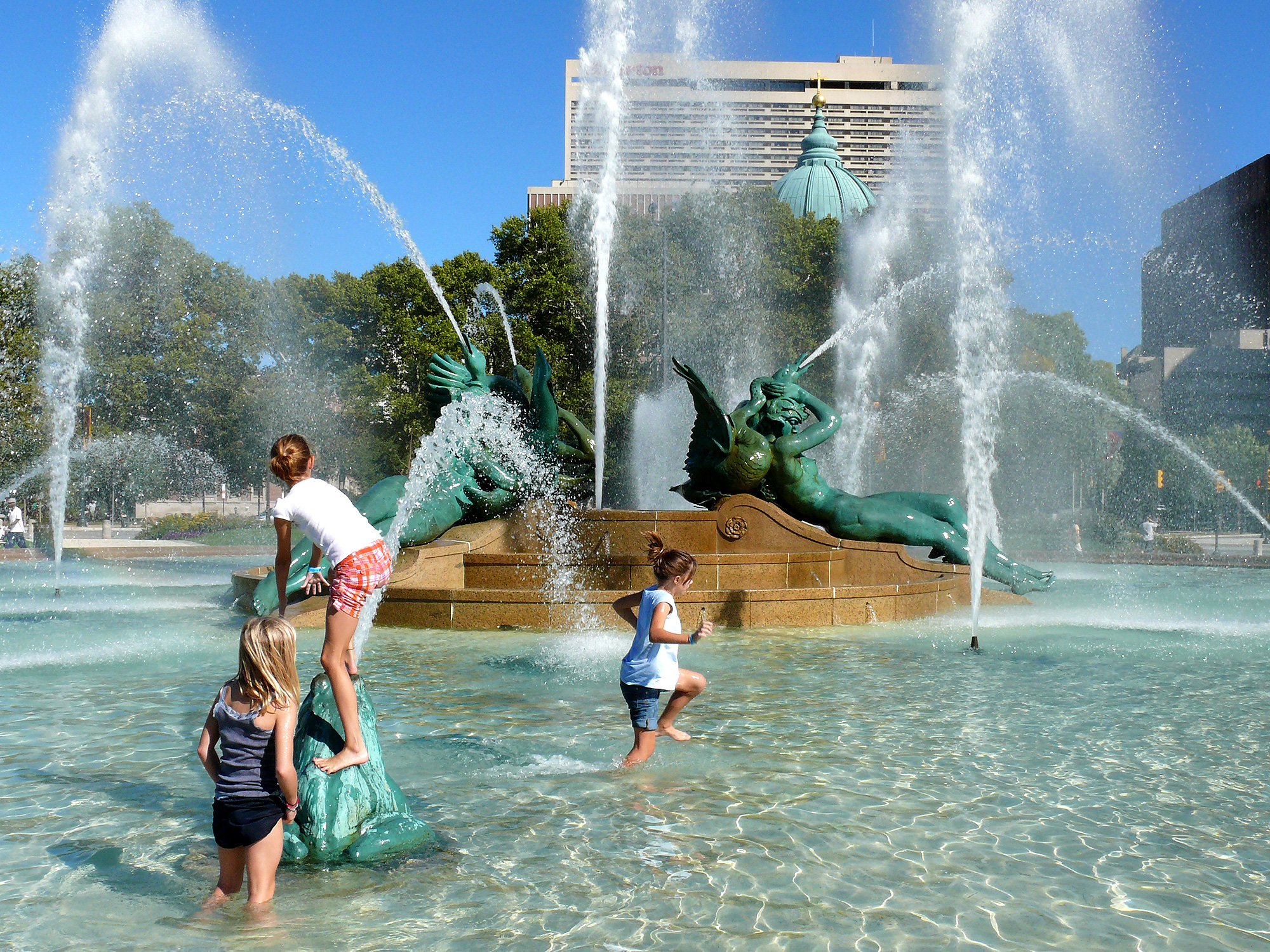
Swann Memorial Fountain, Logan Circle, Philadelphia (1924), Eyre & McIlvaine, architects; Alexander Stirling Calder, sculptor.
