= Rochelle Park =

Rochelle Park may refer to:

- Rochelle Park, New Jersey, a town in New Jersey
- Rochelle Park (New Rochelle), a historic neighborhood in the city of New Rochelle, Westchester County, New York
- Rochelle Park–Rochelle Heights Historic District, a National Register of Historic Places designated historic district in New Rochelle, New York
