= Wilson Eyre House =

Historic house in Pennsylvania, United States

- U.S. National Register of Historic Places
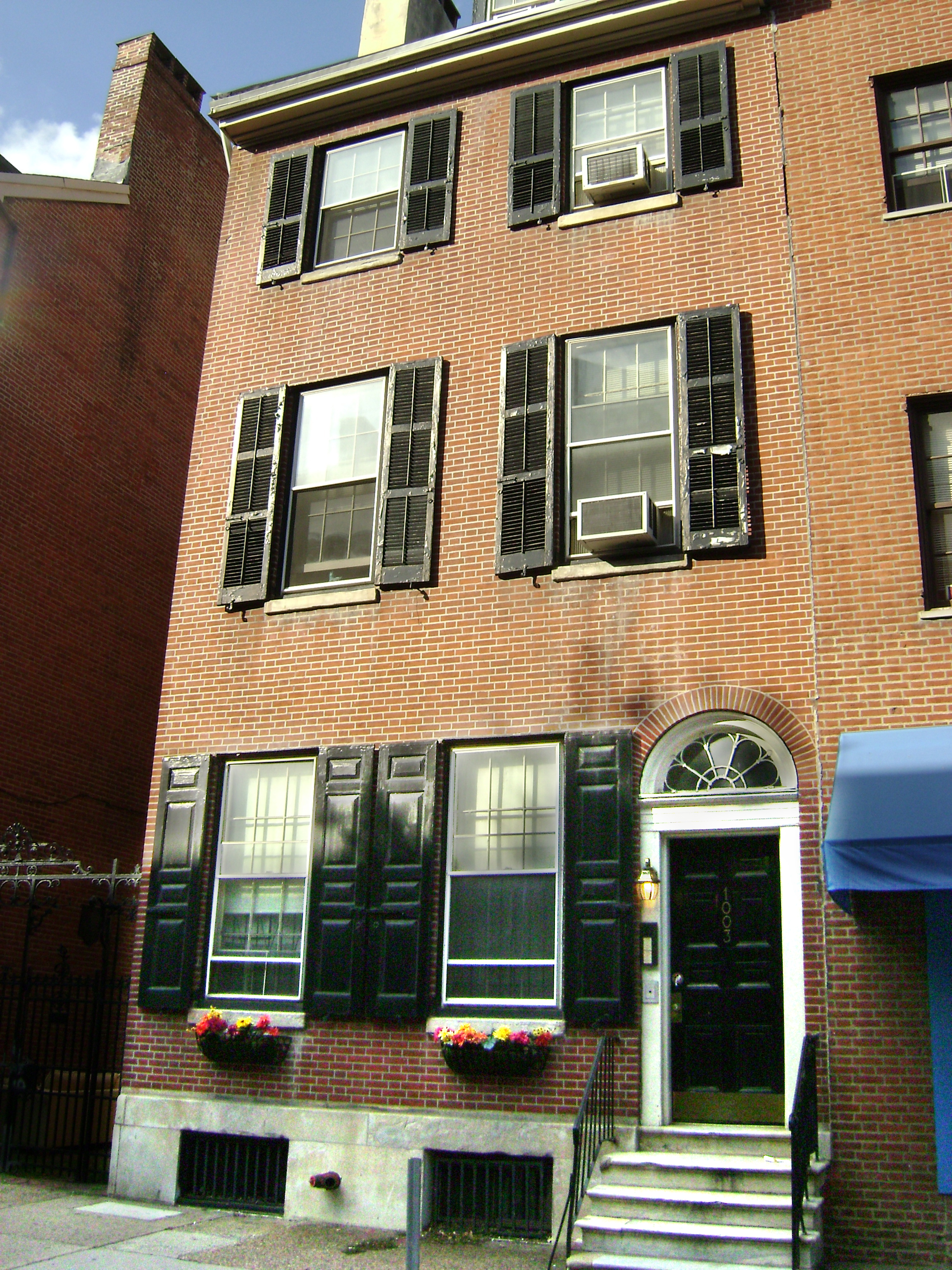
- Wilson Eyre House, October 2009

- Location within Philadelphia Location within Pennsylvania Location within the United States
- Location: 1003 Spruce St., Philadelphia, Pennsylvania
- Coordinates: 39°56′46″N 75°9′31″W
- Area: less than one acre
- Built: c. 1832, 1909
- Architect: Eyre, Wilson Jr.
- Architectural style: Greek Revival; Arts & Crafts Movement
- NRHP reference No.: 77001183
- Added to NRHP: April 13, 1977

The Wilson Eyre House is an historic residence in the Washington Square West neighborhood of Philadelphia, Pennsylvania, United States.

The house was added to the National Register of Historic Places in 1977.

== History and architectural features ==
Built between 1830 and 1835, this historic structure is a three-story brick dwelling with a low to medium roof and dormer. A three-story brick extension was added in 1909 by its then-owner, architect Wilson Eyre (1858-1944). Eyre purchased the home in 1909, and occupied it until his death in 1944.
