= Sally Watson House =

Historic house in Pennsylvania, United States

- U.S. National Register of Historic Places
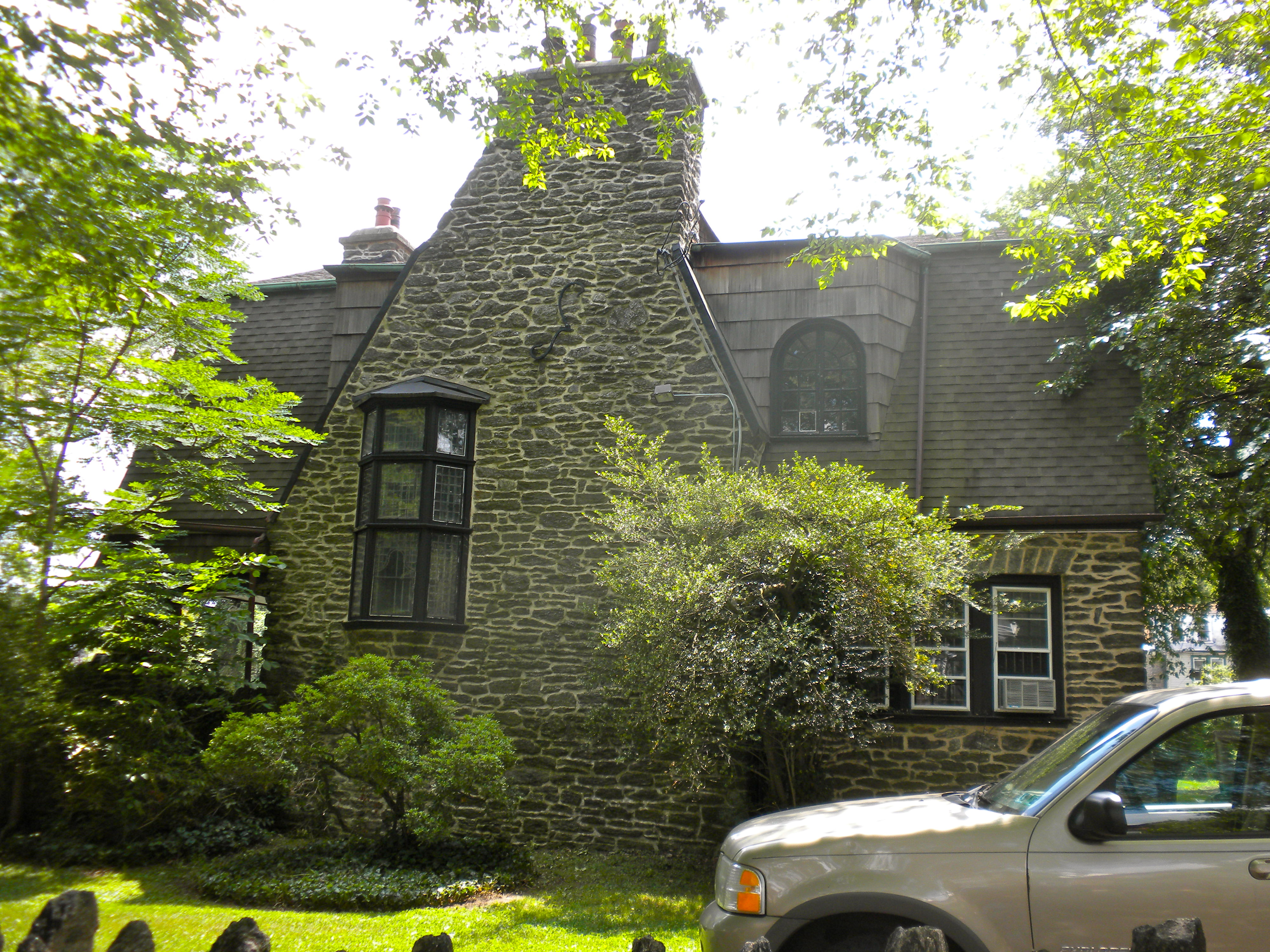
- Sally Watson House, June 2010

- Location within Philadelphia Location within Pennsylvania Location within the United States
- Location: 5128 Wayne Ave., Philadelphia, Pennsylvania
- Coordinates: 40.02582°N 75.17000°W
- Area: 0.7 acres (0.28 ha)
- Built: 1889
- Architect: Eyre, Wilson, Jr.
- Architectural style: Shingle Style
- NRHP reference No.: 82003818
- Added to NRHP: March 10, 1982

Sally Watson House is a historic home located in the Germantown neighborhood of Philadelphia, Pennsylvania. It was designed by architect Wilson Eyre and built in 1886 for Sarah R. ("Sallie") Watson (1844-1918). It is a three-story, rubble schist and shingle dwelling in the Shingle style. It has a gambrel roof and measures approximately 43-feet square.

It was added to the National Register of Historic Places in 1982.
