= Neill-Mauran House =

Historic house in Pennsylvania, United States

- U.S. National Register of Historic Places
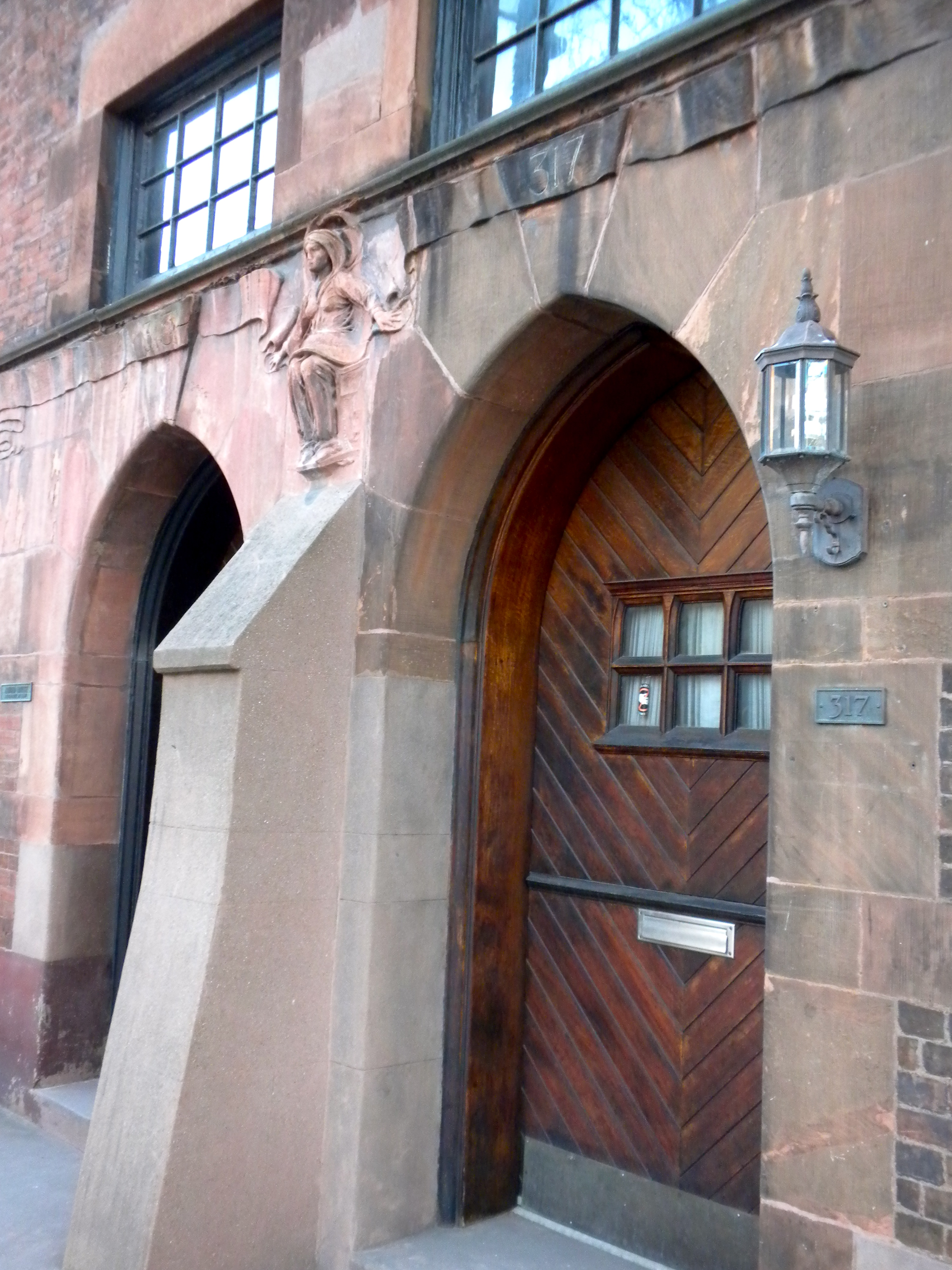
- Neill-Mauran House entrance, February 2010

- Location within Philadelphia Location within Pennsylvania Location within the United States
- Location: 315–317 S. 22nd Street, Philadelphia, Pennsylvania
- Coordinates: 39°56′52″N 75°10′41″W
- Area: 0.1 acres (0.040 ha)
- Built: 1890
- Architect: Wilson Eyre Jr.
- Architectural style: Medieval Revival
- NRHP reference No.: 80003614
- Added to NRHP: June 30, 1980

The Neill-Mauran House is an historic double house in the Rittenhouse Square West neighborhood of Philadelphia, Pennsylvania, US.

This property was added to the National Register of Historic Places in 1980.

== History and architectural features ==
Designed by the architect Wilson Eyre (1858-1944) and built in 1890, this is a four-story, asymmetrical, brick-faced dwelling with basement and attic. The entries have brownstone trim and the overall design is in a Medieval Revival style. It has a slate covered gambrel roof, with terra cotta ridge caps and cross gable.

== Gallery ==
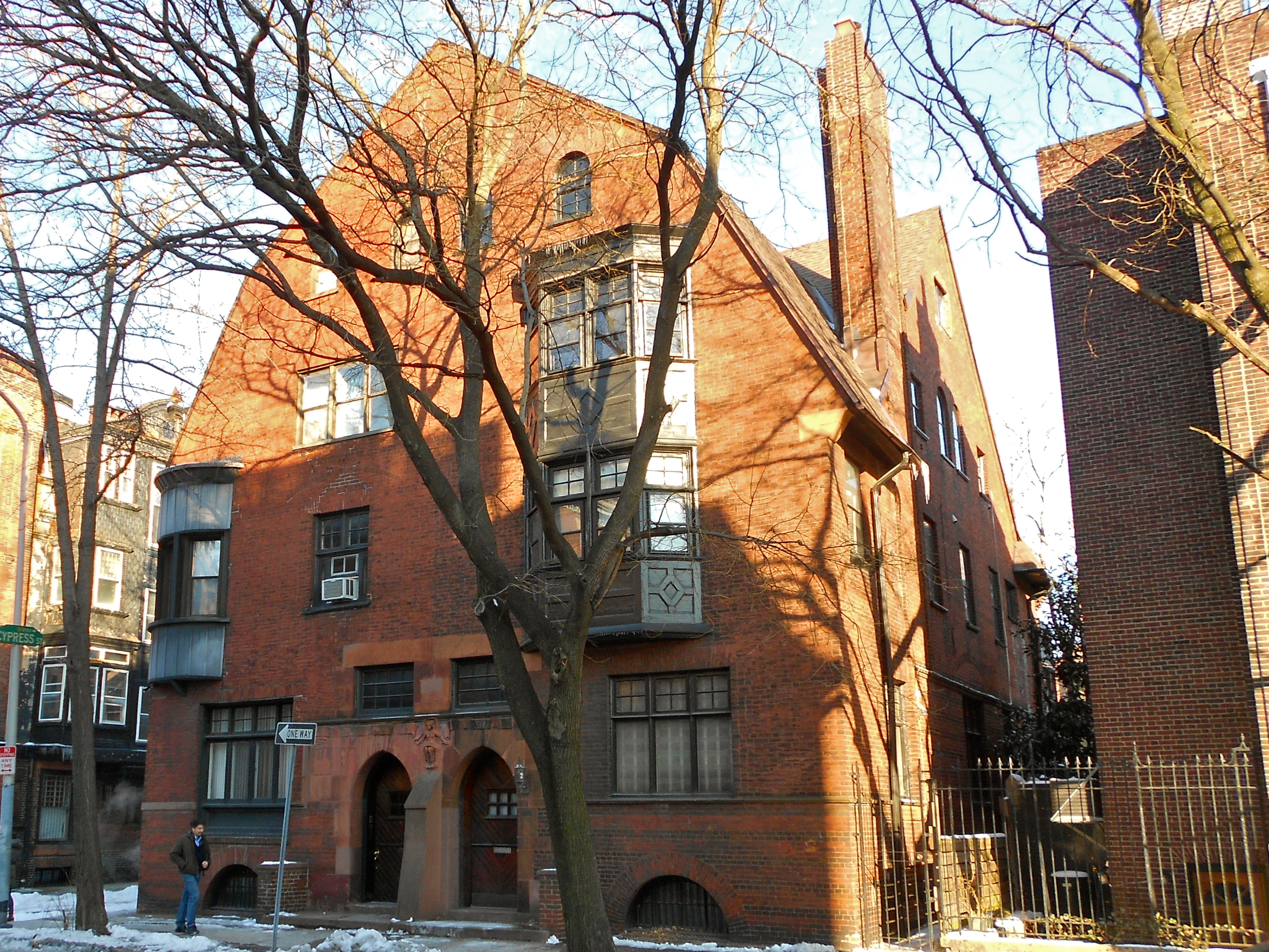
View from the west
