= Rochelle Heights =

Rochelle Heights is a historic residential neighborhood in the city of New Rochelle, in Westchester County, New York. The area is bordered by the City Park area on the east, Interstate 95 on the south, and Rochelle Park on the west. The Rochelle Heights and Rochelle Park neighborhoods together create the Rochelle Park-Rochelle Heights Historic District.

== History ==
Rochelle Heights was laid out in a number of phases beginning in 1905 by New York architects Mann, MacNellie and Lindeberg. Its landscape design is more efficient than Rochelle Park, reflecting its later period of development. The architecture of Rochelle Heights does not have the same uniformity as Rochelle Park but rather, reflects the diversity of scale and style found in suburban architecture in the early twentieth century, including Queen Anne, shingle, arts and crafts, Tudor Revival, beax-arts and Colonial Revival. These two neighborhoods, combined into one historic district in 1986, reflect the history of suburban design since 1885 when the phenomenon first took hold in the United States.

The plan for Rochelle Heights is organized around a promontory in the northeastern part of the subdivision that was set aside for large houses with the status of water views. As the plan descended from this highpoint, a hierarchy of lots and architecture is shown in a secondary group encircling the hill. The properties at the outer limits of the development are more closely arranged in a tight pattern with detached houses intended for a middle-class clientele. The latter properties provided a buffer against the more random development outside the district and protected the neighborhood's exclusive environment within.
