= Detroit Club =

- U.S. National Register of Historic Places
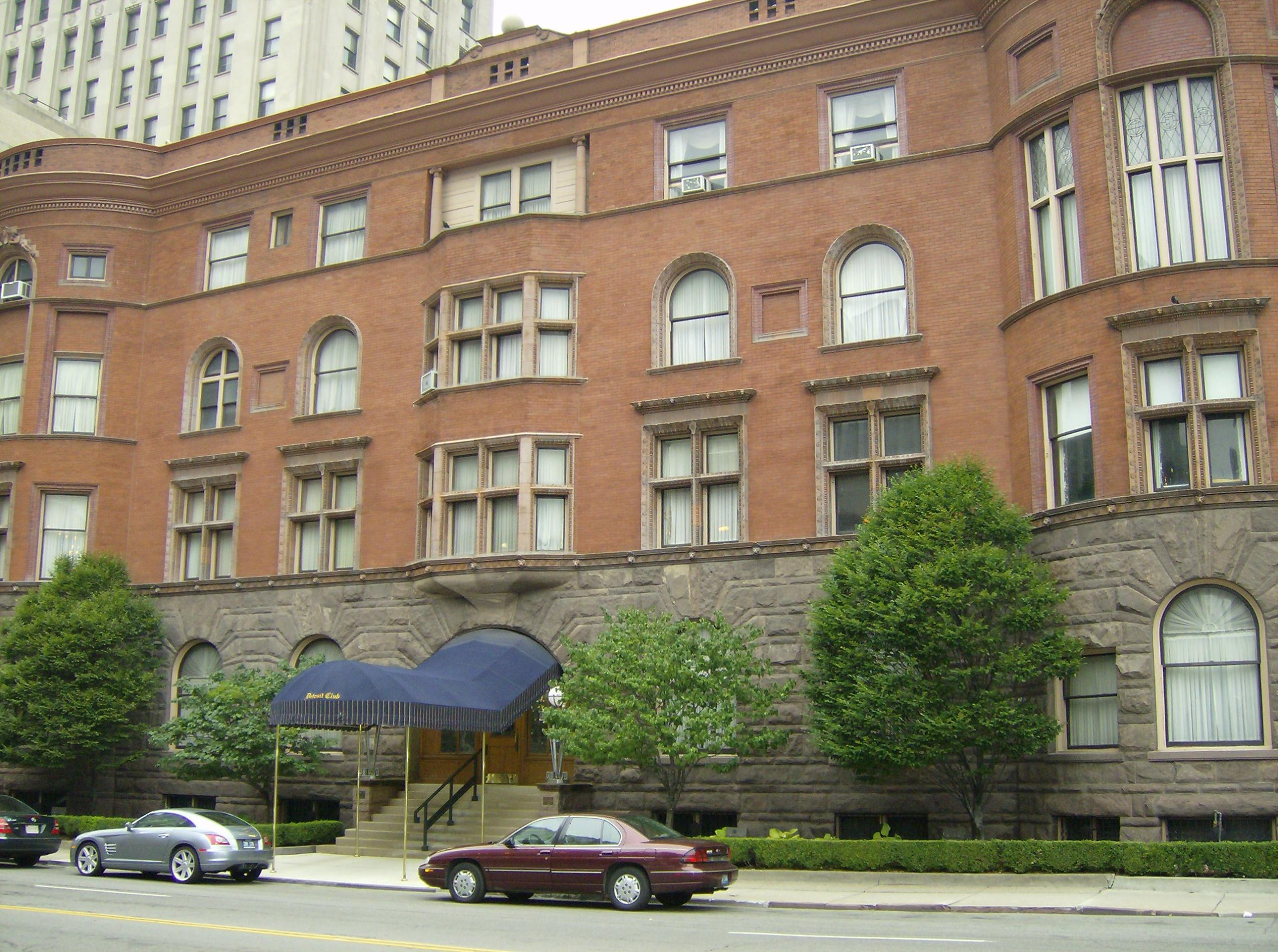
- Interactive map
- Location: 712 Cass Avenue; Detroit, Michigan
- Coordinates: 42°19′47″N 83°3′3″W
- Built: 1891
- Architect: Wilson Eyre Jr., John Scott & Co.
- Architectural style: Romanesque Revival, Renaissance Revival
- NRHP reference No.: 04001577
- Added to NRHP: February 2, 2005

The Detroit Club is a private social club located in Downtown Detroit, Michigan. The building was constructed in 1891 and listed on the National Register of Historic Places in 2005.

== History ==
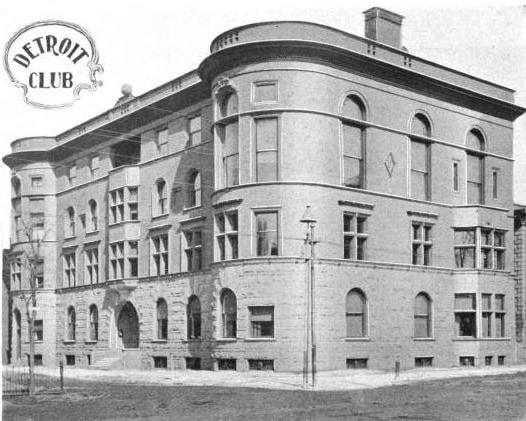
The Detroit Club, c. 1899

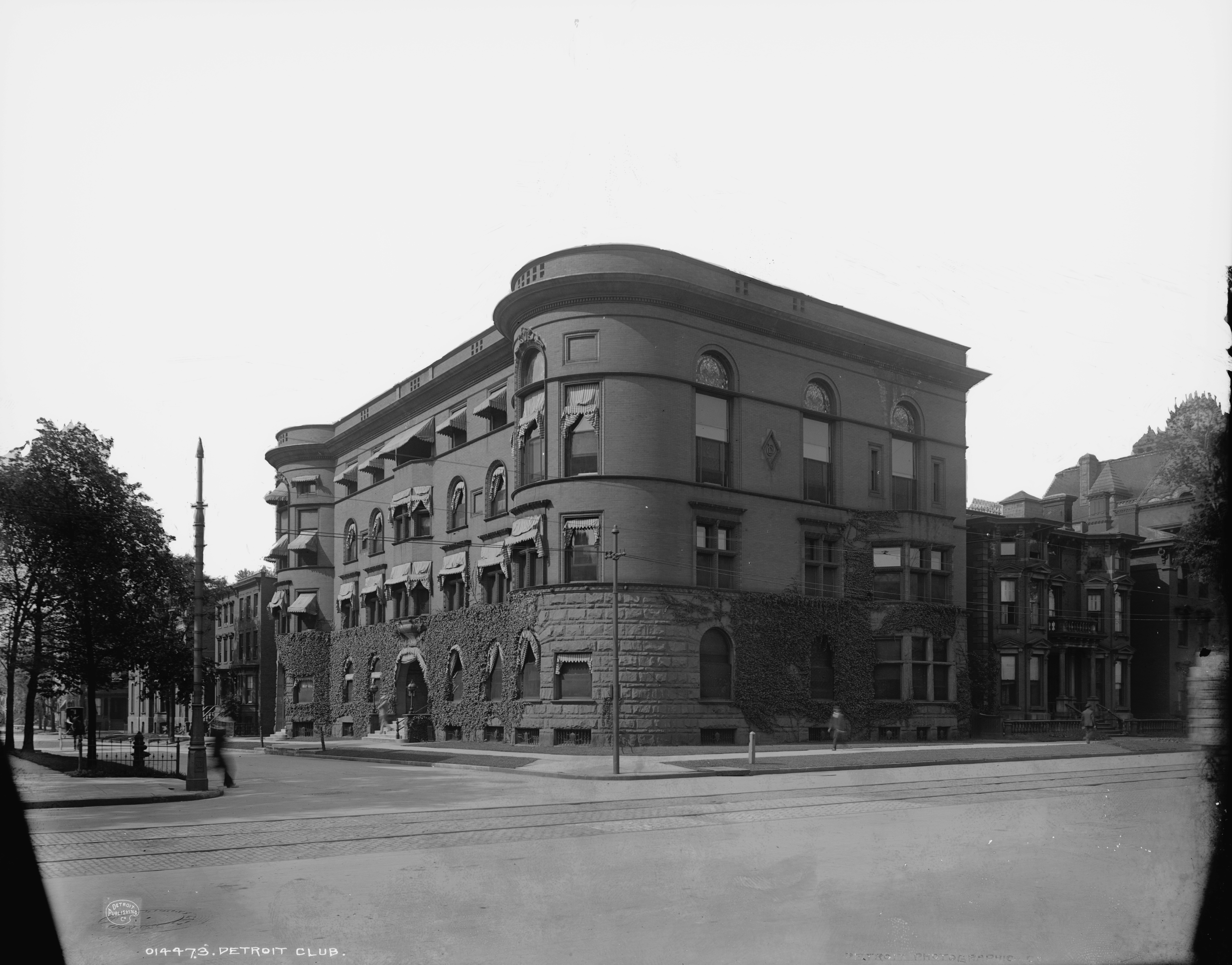
The Detroit Club, c. 1903

The Detroit Club dates to 1882, when attorney Samuel Townsend Douglas and banker/broker James Valentine Campbell, Jr. decided to found a club where local businessmen could meet. With an original membership of 10, they rented a house on Lafayette between Wayne and Cass, and hired a chef. They soon convinced 100 more of Detroit's citizens to join. Early members included Russell A. Alger, ex-governor of Michigan, Hugh McMillan, founder of the Michigan Telephone Company, and real estate magnate James B. Book.

Within a year, the club had outgrown its first home and moved to larger quarters on Fort Street. Less than a decade later, the club hired architect Wilson Eyre to design a new building.

== Architecture ==
The Detroit Club is a four-story brick and stone Romanesque Revival building. The front door is hidden within an unusual recessed archway with stairs. The club features a grill and library on the first floor, a family room on the second floor, and a main dining room with smaller meeting rooms on the third floor. The interior features fine woodwork, a wide main stair, and an enormous fireplace in the main dining hall. The original woodwork was lighter than the current version.

== Events ==
A number of pivotal events in the twentieth century took place within the walls of the Detroit Club. In 1902, the Automobile Club of Detroit was organized at a meeting in the club. In 1922, Michigan governor Alex Groesbeck held strategy sessions to decide whom to tap to fill the open Senate seat which resulted from Truman Newberry's resignation. Groesbeck chose James Couzens. In 1930, Governor Fred W. Green met with Detroit bank presidents to work out details for closing the city's banks. In 1944–45, after an extensive series of meetings at the club, Henry Ford II wrested control of Ford Motor Company from Harry Bennett. Later, Lee Iacocca used the club to launch his campaign to restore the Statue of Liberty and develop Ellis Island into a museum.

Dignitaries entertained at the Club include Harry Truman, Herbert Hoover, Franklin Roosevelt, Prince William of Sweden, Empress Zita of Austria, the Duke of Windsor, Margaret Truman, Charles Lindbergh, Gene Tunney, Admiral Richard Byrd, John D. Rockefeller and Edward G. Robinson.

== See also ==
- List of American gentlemen's clubs
- Detroit Athletic Club
- Detroit Economic Club
