= Dr. Henry Genet Taylor House and Office =

Historic house in New Jersey, United States

- U.S. National Register of Historic Places
- New Jersey Register of Historic Places
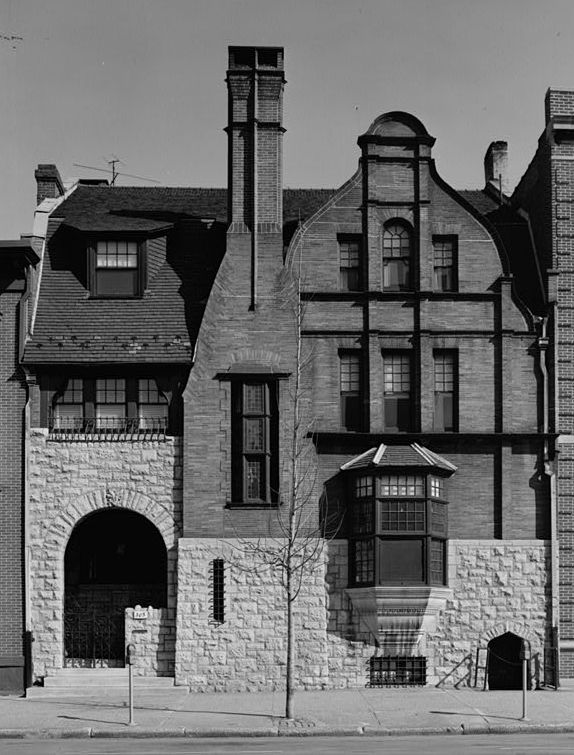
- Dr. Henry Genet Taylor House and Office in 1970.

- Location within Camden County, New Jersey Location within New Jersey Location within the United States
- Location: 305 Cooper Street, Camden, New Jersey
- Coordinates: 39°56′51″N 75°7′23″W
- Area: less than one acre
- Built: 1884
- Architect: Wilson Eyre
- Architectural style: Queen Anne
- NRHP reference No.: 71000500
- NJRHP No.: 929

Significant dates
- Added to NRHP: August 12, 1971
- Designated NJRHP: May 6, 1971

Dr. Henry Genet Taylor House and Office is located in Camden, Camden County, New Jersey, United States. It was added to the National Register of Historic Places on August 12, 1971. The building was designed by Wilson Eyre and was built in 1884.

As of January 2015, renovation was underway by Rutgers University–Camden to convert the building into a Writers House for graduate students.

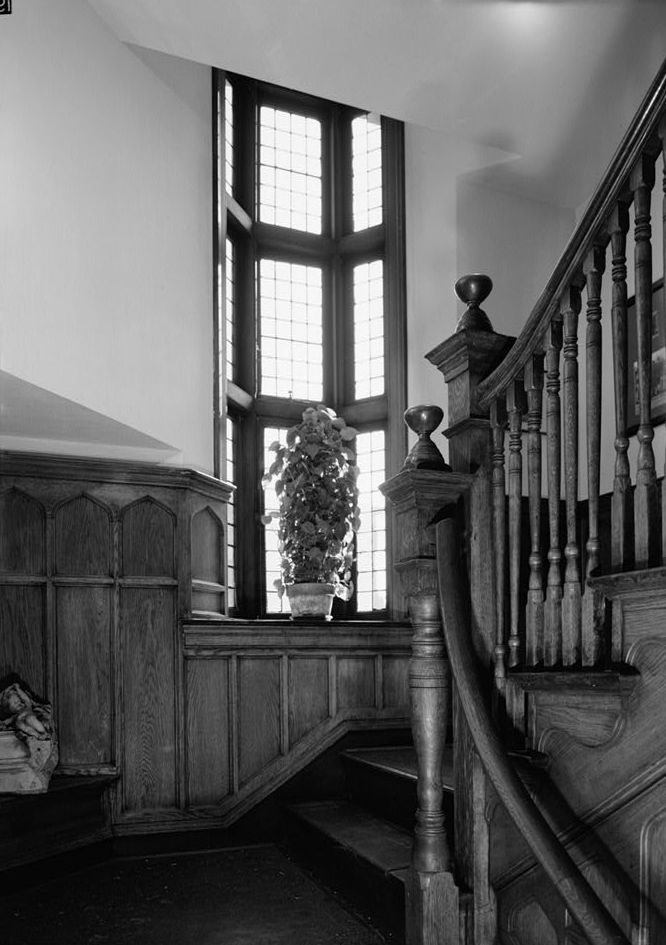
Interior of the Taylor House.

== See also ==
- National Register of Historic Places listings in Camden County, New Jersey
