= Mask and Wig Club =

Musical comedy troupe in the United States

- Mask and Wig Club of the University of Pennsylvania
- U.S. National Register of Historic Places
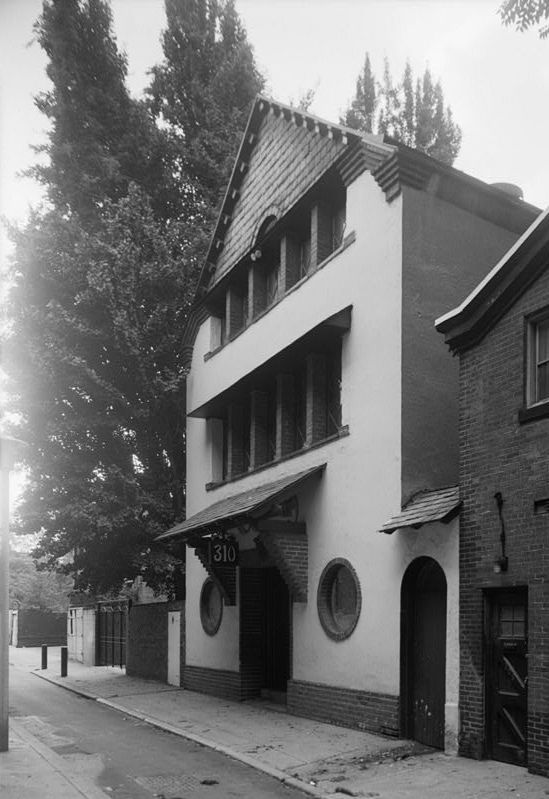
- Mask & Wig Clubhouse (remodeled by Wilson Eyre, 1894)
- Location: 310 South Quince Street, Philadelphia, Pennsylvania
- Coordinates: 39°56′45.08″N 75°9′36.48″W
- Area: 0.1 acres (0.040 ha)
- Built: as St. Paul's Lutheran Church, 1834; remodeled into clubhouse 1894, altered 1901–1903
- Architect: Wilson Eyre; Murals: Maxfield Parrish
- Architectural style: Bavarian Style
- NRHP reference No.: 79002323
- Added to NRHP: November 20, 1979

The Mask and Wig Club, a private club in Philadelphia, Pennsylvania, founded in 1889, is a historic collegiate musical comedy troupe. Created as an alternative to the existing theatrical and dramatic outlets at the University of Pennsylvania, Mask and Wig has presented comedy, music, and dancing to the University of Pennsylvania, Philadelphia, and audiences across the country. Its credo is "Justice to the stage; credit to the University."

It operates as a 501(c)(3) Public Charity. In 2025, it claimed $878,091 in total revenue and $5,404,745 in total assets.

The club's performers, or "The Cast," put on two all-original shows each year in collaboration with the Club's own stage crew, band, and business staff.

A number of Mask and Wig original songs were made famous on the radio by mid 20th century recording artists. "The Gypsy in My Soul," written by Clay Boland and Moe Jaffe for a 1937 show, was recorded by Benny Goodman, Tommy Dorsey, and Ella Fitzgerald. "Daddy", written by Bobby Troup for a 1941 show, was recorded by Sammy Kaye, Glen Miller and the Andrews Sisters. Troup went on to write the jazz standard "Route 66," which was recorded by Nat King Cole, Bing Crosby (with the Andrews Sisters), and later the Rolling Stones. The first electrically recorded album ever released was Mask and Wig's "Joan of Arkansas," in April 1925.

In a September 30, 2021, press release, the club announced an initiative to remove gender as a qualification for membership, and to expand participation and membership to all genders for the first time in its 134-year history starting with the Fall 2022 recruitment cycle.

== History ==
The Mask and Wig Club of the University of Pennsylvania was first conceived of in 1888 by a small group of undergraduates, led by Clayton Fotterall McMichael, who were interested in the stage and desired something the University did not offer: a troupe that would produce original humorous theatrical pieces. In 1889, therefore, McMichael and the other original founders sent out a call for undergraduate men to audition for the group and participate in the creation and production of its first performance.

McMichael and his peers envisioned a group that involved dressing up in frocks and performing spoofs and parodies. Because colleges at the time were open only to young gentlemen, any production was limited to an all–male cast. These organizations naturally saw burlesque, which was quite popular in that era, as the perfect genre. The overblown characterizations, loose plotting, musical interludes, and parody of high art made the style perfect for a group of young, well-educated, amateur men, especially since the drag tradition came "built-in".

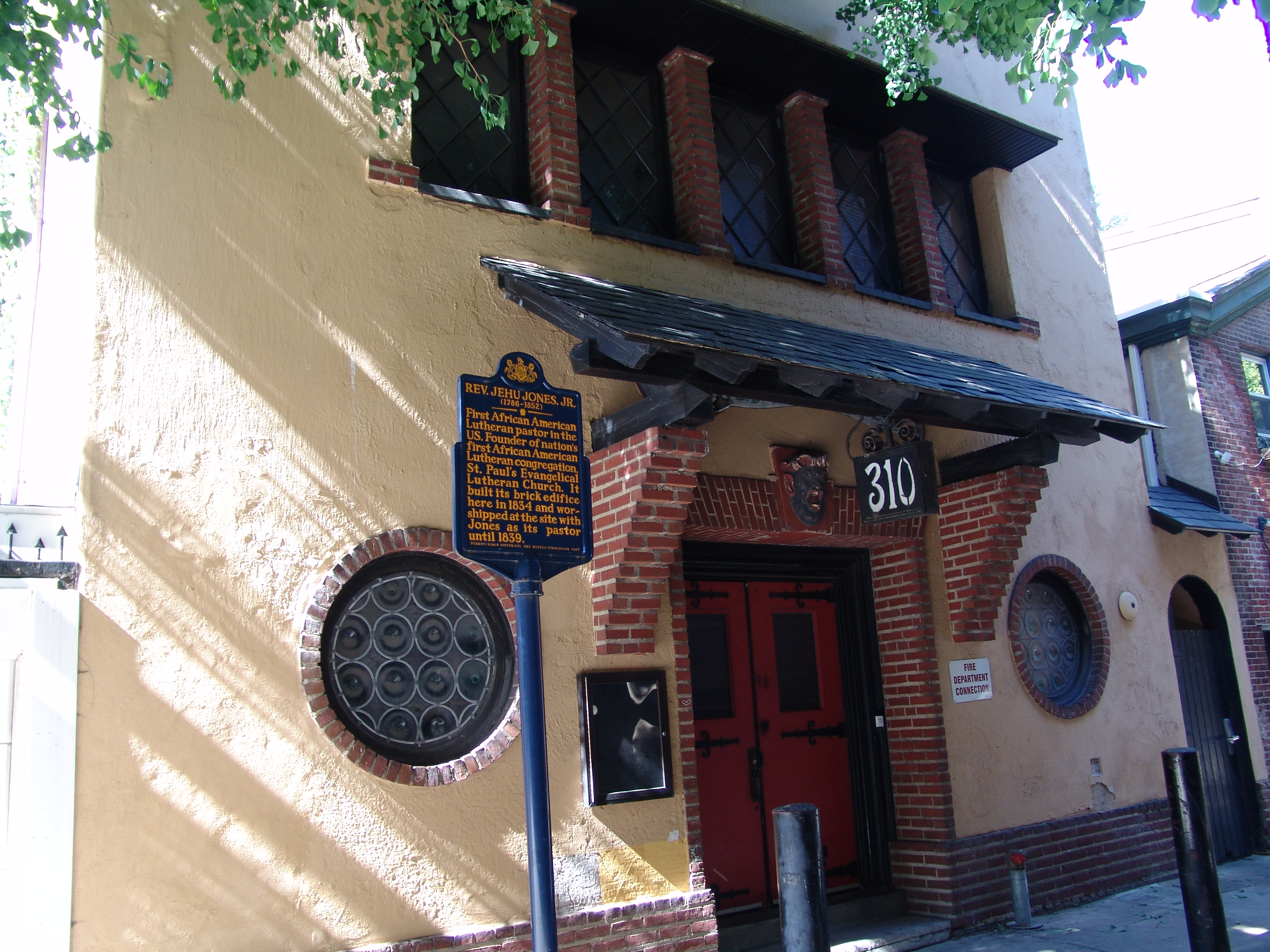
The Mask and Wig Club in October 2024.

Founder McMichael combed the local bookstores for a story to produce and found it in Henry Byron's The Nymphs of the Lurleyburg. A substantially altered version, "Lurline", the Club's first production, hit the boards at the Chestnut Street Opera House on June 4, 1889, for one night only. Backed financially by the ladies of Philadelphia high society, the Club enjoyed great success in its early years. With increasingly reliable audience turnout and revenue from ticket sales, the runs were extended and the Club established a fine tradition among Philadelphia's theater-going society. Moreover, the club made a very strong impression on campus and it achieved great notoriety within its first year of existence.

Company members rehearsing at the clubhouse in 1930

In 1894 the Club purchased a property at 310 South Quince Street to serve as a gathering place and rehearsal hall, the Mask and Wig Clubhouse. The building had been erected by the first African-American Lutheran congregation in America as St. Paul's Lutheran Church in 1834, but had been sold in 1839 and converted into a coachhouse and stable, and later into a dissecting room for medical students. Prominent Philadelphia architect Wilson Eyre was commissioned to remodel the building and hired the young Maxfield Parrish, who would later become one of the greatest illustrators of the 20th century, to decorate the interior. The Grille Room was decorated with caricatures of members, a tradition that continues today, with the second century of members' caricatures continued upstairs at the entrance to the auditorium. Eyre expanded the clubhouse to its present size, 1901-1903.

The Club prospered throughout the late 19th and early 20th centuries. The middle of this century was a heady time for the Club. Mask and Wig songs were the rage of the big band orchestras, radio shows, and solo acts of the day. The likes of Frank Sinatra, Glenn Miller, Tommy Dorsey, Benny Goodman, Count Basie, Rosemary Clooney, and Les Brown all covered Mask and Wig tunes. Between 1952 and 1958, the club appeared four times on The Ed Sullivan Show. The 1961 production, Wry on the Rocks, introduced a satirical revue format in a cabaret atmosphere. In 1992, with Myth America, Mask and Wig returned the student–written book musical to its stage, a practice which continues to this day. Important in the show's success are the traditional high standards in the caliber of performers and excellence of the material performed. The Club's primary purpose has always been and continues to be, "Justice to the stage; credit to the University."

Immediately after the end of World War II the Mask and Wig dormitory on the residence quadrangle was used to house a U.S. Army unit assigned to quickly learn the Japanese language. Upon the completion of the study, the soldiers were to be commissioned in the U.S. Army and serve in the Counterintelligence Corps (CIC) of the Army in Japan. This army unit had classes in the University in the Egyptian Antiquities room while being scrutinized by several mummies. Classes were also held in the Wharton School of Business. Jerry Epple, a member of the Army Specialized Training Program, says he remembers to this day the stone carving of a mask and wig near the dormitory entrance.

Mask and Wig's yearly tour over spring break brings the show to alumni clubs across the nation.

== Organization ==
=== Club organization ===
The Mask and Wig Club stands unique among Penn student activities since the Club includes both alumni and undergraduate members. Established as an independent 501(c)3 nonprofit organization, the Club operates independently of the University of Pennsylvania while simultaneously maintaining a productive partnership with the University. All undergraduate members of the Mask and Wig Club participate in the on-campus activities of Mask and Wig at Penn. The Troupe consists of undergraduates who audition each fall and are selected into the various company sections (see below).

The Club produces the Annual Production and maintains and operates its own landmark theater at 310 South Quince Street (see below). The Clubhouse is a popular wedding and event venue in Philadelphia and was named "Best Party Venue" by Philadelphia Magazine in 2010.

The Club is led by its Board of Governors, a group consisting of Alumni and Undergraduate members who take active responsibility for the operations of the Club, production of performances, and maintenance of the Clubhouse. The current alumni president is Kyle Kozloff, who is a Penn Wharton graduate from the class of 1990 and currently employed as an SG&A Executive at Kozloff Household.

=== Undergraduate sections ===
The Mask and Wig Club is made up of four distinct sections: the cast, the band, the crew, and the business staff.

The cast writes and performs material for productions. The band functions as a pit orchestra, playing original, self-arranged pieces for the Undergraduate Fall Show, and professionally arranged pieces for the Annual Production. The band also holds the headliner spot at the University of Pennsylvania's annual Spring Fling festival in the Quad. The crew builds elaborate, ornate, and completely original sets for Productions. The business staff is responsible for advertising and selling tickets for the Club's shows.

== Performances ==
=== Free Show ===
Free Show is the first Mask and Wig show of the academic year. The show is held during the first week of the academic year and is free of charge to all new freshmen. The cast performs classic bits that are tried and true. Free Show serves a few purposes: it introduces the new freshmen of the University of Pennsylvania to one of Penn's oldest institutions and hopes to recruit new members by displaying what membership in the group entails. In 2018, for the first time, the Free Show was performed in collaboration with Penn's all-female musical sketch comedy troupe, Bloomers.

=== Undergraduate Fall Show ===
Each fall, the undergraduates produce their own sketch comedy show that runs for one week in a theater on Penn's campus. The upperclassmen handle all aspects of production from acting direction to choreography to musical production. A notable highlight of the show is the Second Act Opener, which consists of a medley of songs from a famous musician or group, but with parodied lyrics that often follow a Penn-centered plot. Past parodied musicians include Stevie Wonder, Michael Jackson, Billy Joel, The Beatles, Aerosmith, Disney, and Queen.

=== ComFest ===
In 1999, Mask and Wig established an annual Intercollegiate Comedy Festival to showcase the talent of the nation's best collegiate sketch comedy troupes. The mission of the festival is not just to put on a hilarious show that cultivates new talent, but also to honor and showcase a well-known comedian. Each host does a stand-up routine for the audience and participates in sketches with Mask and Wig. Past college sketch troupes include:

- Princeton Triangle Club
- University of Maryland Sketchup
- Yale Fifth Humour
- Boston College Hello Shovelhead
- Cornell University Humor Us! Sketch Comedy
- Tufts University's Major: Undecided Sketch Comedy

=== Annual Production "Spring Show" ===
The Annual Production, colloquially known as the "Spring Show", is the theatrical centerpiece of Mask and Wig. Performed at The Mask and Wig Clubhouse, the production is an original show that runs from late January to early April. While the format of the Spring Show has evolved over the years, the show currently runs as a full "book" musical comedy, complete with singing and tap dancing.

Unlike the Fall Show, the Annual Production is professionally composed, directed, and choreographed by some of the best talents in the industry. The script, however, is written by the Club's cast.

=== Tour ===
During spring break the troupe takes their show around the country as they road trip across the United States, performing in areas with a high Penn alumni concentration. The trip usually includes about four to six stops. In recent years the tour has taken Wig to cities like London, Los Angeles, New York City, San Francisco, Las Vegas, Chicago, and Toronto.

The tour is one of the group's many longstanding traditions. At one time, the group had its own train car, which it used to travel with its shows around the country.

=== Spring Fling ===
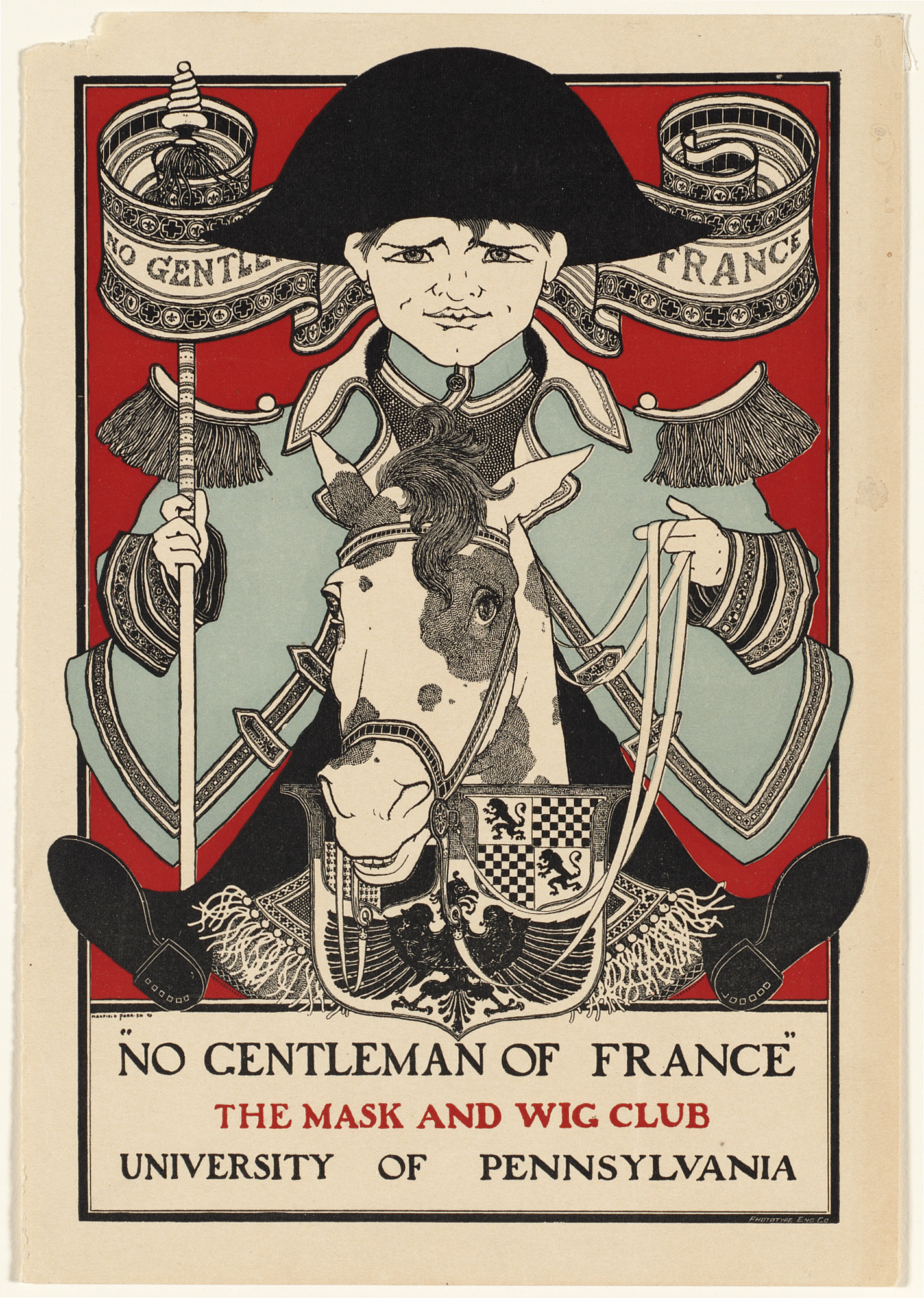
Maxfield Parrish's illustration of the winter 1895–1896 Mask and Wig program. Parrish also made mural and other art for Mask and Wig Clubhouse.

The Mask and Wig Band traditionally headlines the last day of Spring Fling performances, which was historically a Saturday, at the stage in the Lower Quad. In 2018, the festival was moved to Penn Park along with the Mask and Wig performance. They generally perform an hour-long set of covers of popular music. Members of the cast generally sing with the band, along with female vocalists from other Penn performing arts groups.

== The Clubhouse ==
=== Clubhouse art ===
Working in his studio just a few blocks away at Thirteenth and Walnut Streets, Maxfield Parrish received one of his first commissions in 1894 from Mask and Wig. This first job came as he was finishing his studies at the Pennsylvania Academy; it was for decoration of the stage proscenium and ticket window, illustration of a number of caricatures on the wall of the Grille Room, and most notably the Old King Cole mural. This was the start of his professional career; shortly after seeing the mural, the editor of “Harper's” Magazine invited Parrish to do some of their covers for which he became famous. He would continue working for the Club to finish a total of 35 caricatures and illustrate the earliest program covers.

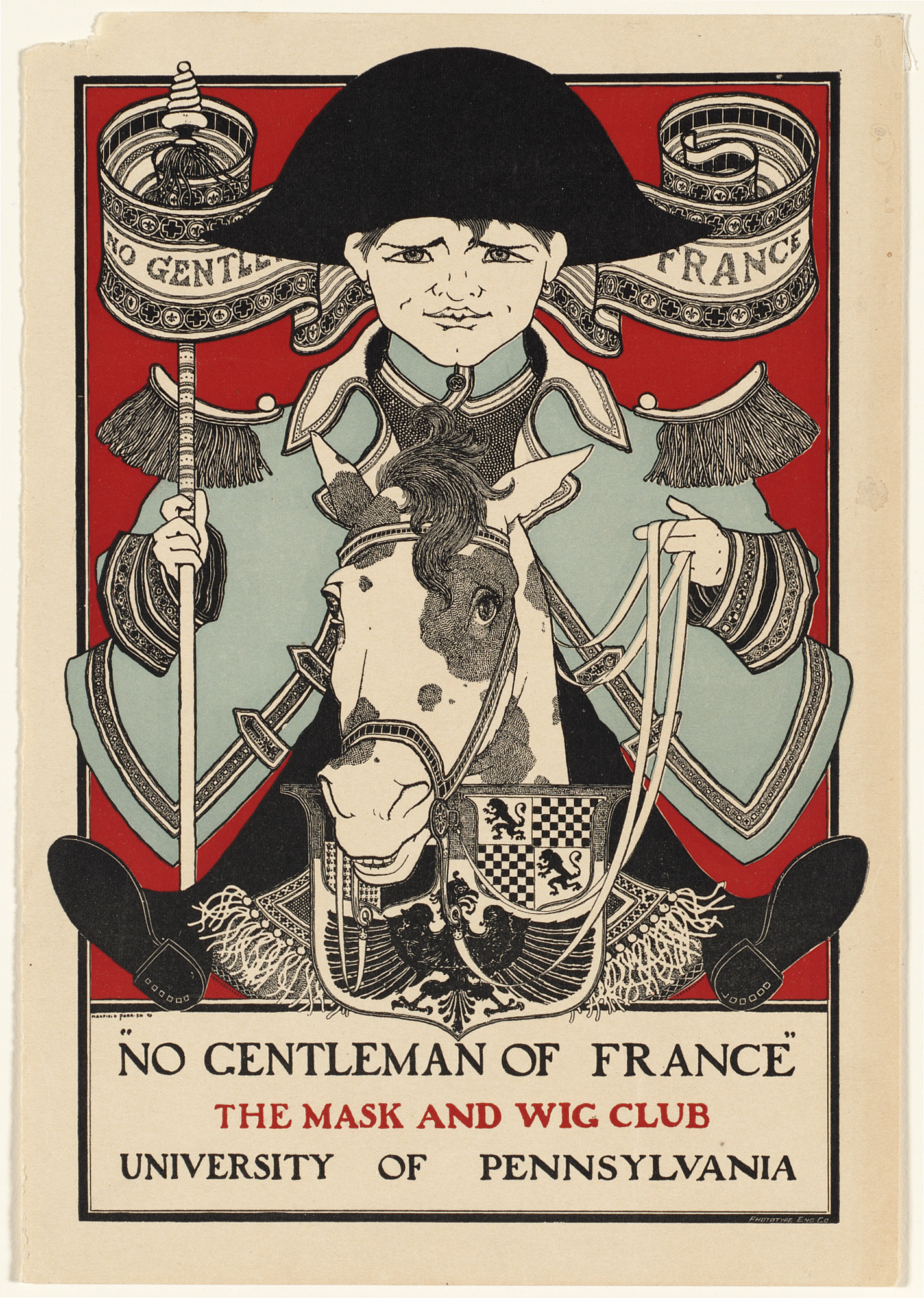
Maxfield Parrish 1896 illustration of one of the earliest programs

Wilson Eyre was older and more established than Parrish when he began working on the Clubhouse, and was good friends with Parrish's father, Stephen. Eyre was the architect in charge of renovating the Club's new home and transforming it from a stable into a “Bavarian” themed Clubhouse. His first remodel in 1894 transformed the space from the stable by adding an entry hall with stairs, designing and decorating the Grille Room, and turning the second floor into a theater. Eyre designed most of the furniture in the Grille Room; three of the original tables still exist. Eyre also oversaw the second major change. The building was enlarged in 1903 by adding 10 feet to the front creating the façade that still exists there today. Eyre's original drawing of the front design, created in 1902, is shown to the right. Eyre's design has endured for over a century with few changes aside from the ongoing addition of paneling for caricatures in the Grille Room and Theater.

=== Clubhouse renovations ===
Immediately following the close of the 2007 Spring show, the clubhouse underwent an extensive renovation. In addition to bringing the building up to modern code, the club also installed an elevator and central air conditioning unit. On the morning of March 15, 2008, a fire broke out in the attic of the clubhouse, setting back the completion date indefinitely. The club had a contingency plan in case of such an emergency and was able to put on their show. "West Wing Story" played for two weekends in April 2008 at the Prince Music Theater in downtown Philadelphia, marking the first annual production to be performed at a venue other than the clubhouse since 1960. With renovations still behind schedule in 2009, the annual production "Oh, the Humanities!" was also performed at the Prince Music Theater for three weekends, selling a record number of tickets due to the large theater capacity. The clubhouse renovation was completed in the fall of 2009, allowing the club to once again return to its own stage for the 2010 Annual Production, "A Cheshire Catastrophe".

== See also ==
- List of traditional gentlemen's clubs in the United States
