= Rochelle Park–Rochelle Heights Historic District =

Historic district in New York, United States

- U.S. National Register of Historic Places
- U.S. Historic district
- New York State Register of Historic Places
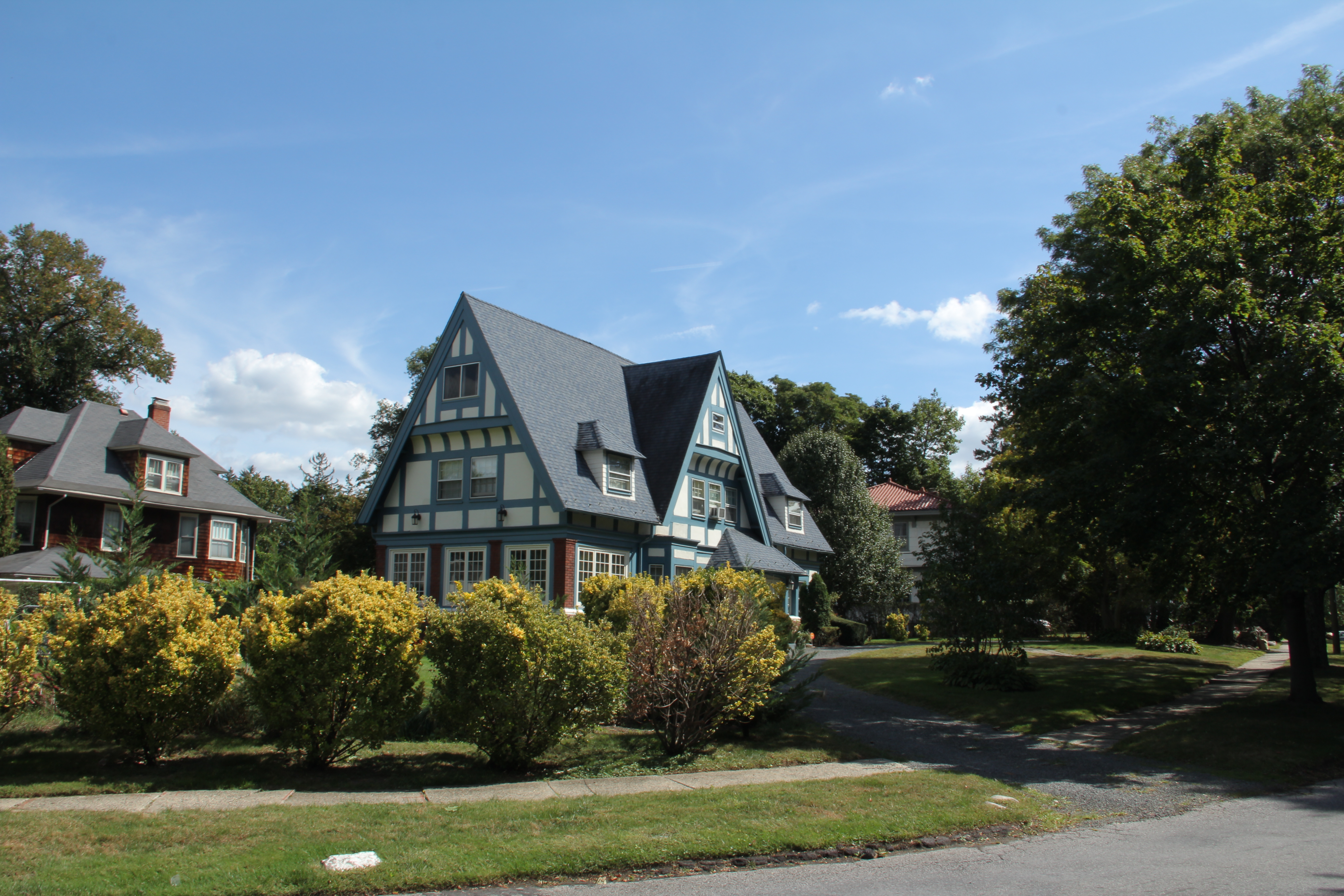

- Location within New York Location within the United States
- Location: The Circle, The Boulevard, The Serpentine, Hamilton Ave. and others, New Rochelle, New York
- Coordinates: 40°55′29″N 73°46′50″W
- Built: 1885
- Architects: Barrett, Nathan F.; Mann, MacNeille & Lindeberg
- Architectural style: Late Victorian, Late 19th And 20th Century Revivals
- NRHP reference No.: 05000664
- NYSRHP No.: 11942.001464

Significant dates
- Added to NRHP: July 06, 2005
- Designated NYSRHP: May 8, 2005

The Rochelle Park–Rochelle Heights Historic District is a historic residential district located in the city of New Rochelle in Westchester, New York. The district is historically and architecturally significant as an intact and distinctive example of residential park development at the turn of the Twentieth Century. It includes the historic Rochelle Park development, and the later Rochelle Heights subdivision. Within the district are 555 contributing properties, including 513 buildings, 38 structures, and 4 sites. Only 24 buildings and 1 site separately identified within its area are non-contributing. It was listed on the National Register of Historic Places (NRHP) on July 6, 2005.

The two neighborhoods, combined into one historic district in 1986, reflect the history of suburban design from 1885 when the phenomenon first took hold in Westchester, the first large suburban area in the world to develop, to the 1920s when the automobile and Progressive Era ideas of planning and architecture were coming into favor. The landscape and house architecture of the area remains remarkably intact and provide valuable information about the range of innovative planning principles that were applied there.

== Rochelle Park ==
Laid out in 1885, Rochelle Park is particularly distinguished as the America's third planned residential community, preceded only by Tuxedo Park in New York and Llewellyn Park in Pennsylvania. Its overall landscape plan was designed by the architect Nathan Franklin Barrett for the Manhattan Life Insurance Company. Rochelle Park epitomizes the suburban development design principles that Frederick Law Olmsted advocated with the creation of Central Park in New York City: a landscape that provides urban dwellers with the restorative benefits of a picturesque natural environment. Incorporating open space, recreational areas, naturalistic settings, and broad boulevards for public interaction. The architecture of the homes is equally impressive, with many fashionable Queen Anne, shingle, and Colonial Revival style "cottages" designed with tall towers and attic porches to take advantage of the views towards Long Island Sound located a mile away.

Rochelle Park is essentially rectangular in dimension, with the southeast corner having been clipped from it by the construction of the New York & New Haven Railroad in the 1850s. In the original plan, the parcel was diagonally divided by a wide boulevard ("The Boulevard") that entered the park at a stone gateway and ended at a circle ("The Court"). The Boulevard was intended to continue east through a tunnel under the railroad tracks and south to Long Island Sound. This planned connection gave the park the cachet of water access even though the development was a good distance away. This amenity lasted a very short time due to additional subdivisions of the property and the elimination of right-of-way.

Despite the setbacks from Barrett's original designs, The Boulevard continued to remain one of the most unusual aspects of the community's landscape. At 100 feet wide, The Boulevard allowed for an abundance of green space and deep setbacks for the houses. The scale and design of the Boulevard reflected Barrett's taste for formal landscape elements that anticipated the City Beautiful Movement. The broad vista created by the Boulevard is intersected in two places by the Serpentine, a roadway that meanders within a rough, rocky section of the landscape. The terrain made a continuous grid plan difficult, thus presenting Barrett with an opportunity to design a more interesting landscape.

== Rochelle Heights ==
The plan for Rochelle Heights is organized around a promontory in the northeastern part of the subdivision that was set aside for large houses with the status of water views. As the plan descended from this highpoint, a hierarchy of lots and architecture is shown in a secondary group encircling the hill. The properties at the outer limits of the development are more closely arranged in a tight pattern with detached houses intended for a middle-class clientele. The latter properties provided a buffer against the more random development outside the district and protected the neighborhood's exclusive environment within.

Rochelle Heights was laid out in a number of phases beginning in 1905 by New York architects Mann, MacNellie and Lindeberg. Its landscape design is more efficient than Rochelle Park, reflecting its later period of development. The architecture of Rochelle Heights does not have the same uniformity as Rochelle Park but rather, reflects the diversity of scale and style found in suburban architecture in the early twentieth century, including Queen Anne, shingle, Tudor Revival, and Colonial Revival. The planners laid out large expansive lots on the southerly side of Cortlandt Avenue where buyers would have views of Long Island Sound. Realizing this, naming the subdivision the "heights" had a certain legitimacy. Tudor Revival, Italian Renaissance and Colonial Revival designs were popular in this collection of homes which was viewed as the highest echelon of the development.

The streets at the outer boundaries of Rochelle Heights contain smaller lots. These streets frame the core of the development and buffer the interior properties. Although these tertiary streets were lesser properties in the context of the Rochelle Heights development, they were still above the mean and intended for a middle-class clientele.

These two neighborhoods, combined into one historic district in 1986, reflect the history of suburban design since 1885 when the phenomenon first took hold in the United States.
