= Rochelle Park, New Rochelle, New York =

Coordinates: 40°55′12″N 73°46′55″W

Rochelle Park is a historic residential neighborhood in the city of New Rochelle, in Westchester County, New York. The area is bordered by Rochelle Heights on the east, Interstate 95 on the south, New Rochelle City Hall and civic center on the west and Iona College on the north. The Rochelle Heights and Rochelle Park neighborhoods together create the Rochelle Park-Rochelle Heights Historic District.

== History ==
Laid out in 1885, Rochelle Park is particularly distinguished as one of the first planned residential communities in the country. Its overall landscape plan was designed by the architect Nathan F. Barrett for the Manhattan Life Insurance Company. Rochelle Park epitomizes the suburban development design principles that Frederick Law Olmsted advocated with the creation of Central Park in New York City: a landscape that provides urban dwellers with the restorative benefits of a picturesque natural environment. Incorporating open space, recreational areas, naturalistic settings, and broad boulevards for public interaction. The architecture of the homes is equally impressive, with many fashionable Shingle Style "cottages" designed with tall towers and attic porches to take advantage of the views towards Long Island Sound located a mile away.

Rochelle Park is essentially rectangular in dimension, with the southeast corner having been clipped from it by the construction of the New York & New Haven Railroad in the 1850s. In the original plan, the parcel was diagonally divided by a wide boulevard (The Boulevard) that entered the park at a stone gateway and ended at a circle ("The Court"). The Boulevard was intended to continue east through a tunnel under the railroad tracks and south to Long Island Sound. This planned connection gave the park the cachet of water access even though the development was a good distance away. This amenity lasted a very short time due to additional subdivisions of the property and the elimination of right-of-way.

== Image gallery ==
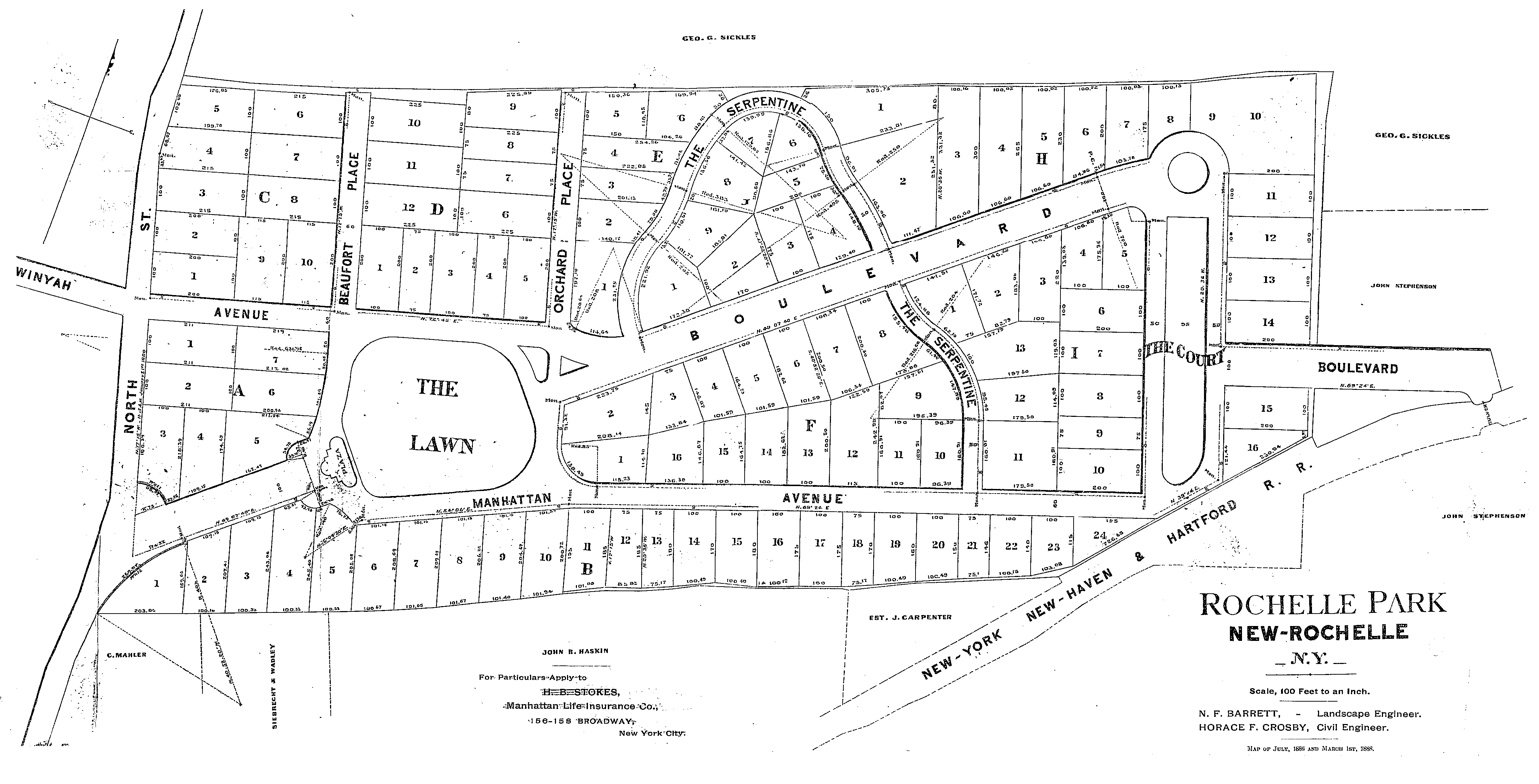
Early map of Rochelle Park

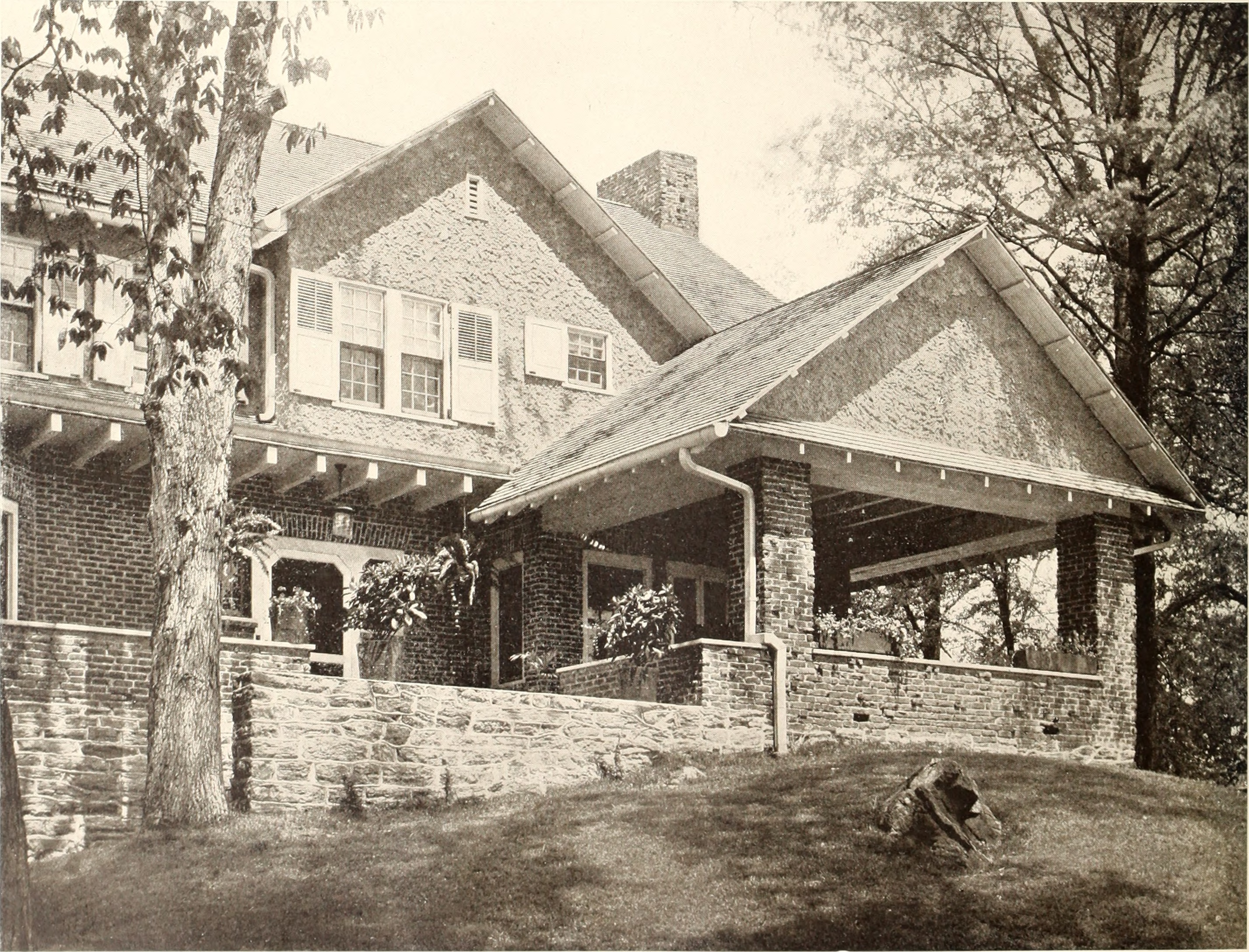
Rochelle Park residence
