= Nathan Franklin Barrett =

American landscape architect

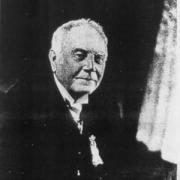
- Nathan F. Barrett c. 1915
- Born: Nathan Franklin Barrett; November 19, 1845; Staten Island, New York
- Died: October 16, 1919 (aged 73); Mount Vernon, New York
- Occupations: Landscape Architect, Urban/Regional Planner

Nathan Franklin Barrett (November 19, 1845 – October 16, 1919) was an American landscape architect. He is best known for his designs for company town of Pullman, Illinois, the Hotel Ponce de Leon in Florida and Naumkeag in Stockbridge, Massachusetts. Barrett was a founding member and president of the American Society of Landscape Architects. He also maintained a long working relationship with many noted architects and firms of the time including those of McKim, Mead & White, Carrère and Hastings and Horace Trumbauer.

== Early life ==
Barrett was born in 1845 near present-day New Brighton on Staten Island. His father, John Thorndike Barrett was a wealthy dye manufacturer with deep roots in New England. His uncle, Col. Nathan Barrett built one of the earliest industrial parks in the country at "Factoryville" on Staten Island. Barrett went to sea for a brief period before returning to serve in the army during the Civil War. Barrett served with distinction as a 1st Lieutenant of the 156th New York Infantry. Barrett began his training as a landscape architect in 1866 by running his brother's nursery and educating himself in formal designs by available literary sources and with instruction from the family's Irish gardener. At that time the art of landscape architecture was but little known in this country.

== Career ==
Barrett's first commissions began in 1869. His early works were largely rail stations in which he received a contract from the Central Railroad of New Jersey. From this early starting point Barrett began to gain notoriety.

In 1880 he gained his most significant commission when he was hired by George Pullman to oversee the layout and design of the company town of Pullman with architect Solon S. Beman. Beman designed all the structures, while Barrett developed the streets, parks, and artificial lake. His work at Pullman led to other municipal commissions throughout the 1880s and 90s including those at Fort Worth, Texas, Chevy Chase, Maryland, and Birmingham, Alabama. Barrett's association with Pullman continued with the design of Pullman's estate in New Jersey. The two men would remain friends til Pullman's death in 1897.

In 1885 Barrett was hired by Carrère and Hastings to lay out the grounds and surrounding area of the Hotel Ponce de Leon in St. Augustine, Florida. The success of the commission enabled Barrett to become the foremost proponent of formal garden design in the country. Following his work in Florida, Barrett began a long relationship overseeing the landscape designs of numerous country houses for noted architects. His most significant and surviving example from this period is at 'Naumkeag' the Stockbridge home of Ambassador Joseph H. Choate. "Naumkeag" is one of the earliest instances in which Barrett is known to have worked with Stanford White. Barrett would go one to design many other major American country estates including "Lynnewood Hall" in Elkins Park PA,(design by Horace Trumbauer), "Woodlea" in Scarborough NY (also by Mckim Mead & White) and "Hammersmith Farm" the Newport home of Hugh Auchincloss.

In addition to his many towns and country estates he also designed numerous parks and public grounds most prominently working under Frederick Law Olmsted for the 1893 World's Columbian Exposition at Chicago, Illinois . In 1895 he was appointed landscape architect for the Parks Commission of Essex County, New Jersey. During his period with Essex County he formed a partnership with fellow design John Bogart. The only known and surviving work of Bogart and Barrett is Branch Brook Park in Newark, New Jersey. In 1900 he was appointed a commissioner of the Palisades Interstate Park Commission by Theodore Roosevelt and Foster M. Voorhees. He was the only commissioner of the Palisades Park to serve on both the New Jersey Commission and the New York Commission and the only commissioner to have served as a landscape architect of the Palisade Park as well.

Barrett is responsible for planning Rochelle Park, a historic section of New Rochelle, New York, recognized and designated for its significance as one of the nation's first planned residential parks from the turn of the twentieth century. There he created a community of great aesthetic beauty, instituting a variety of garden types including the old fashioned Colonial garden, Japanese, Roman and Moorish gardens, as well as English topiary work. In 1890 he built himself a house within the park itself, designed to illustrate the value of landscape architecture in residential design.

Barrett was involved with many professional societies. He was a founding member of the American Society of Landscape Architects and became its president in 1903. He was also active with the National Sculpture Society, for whom he organized numerous exhibitions of works and the National Arts Club.

== Later years ==
Barrett remained busy in the last decade of his life overseeing the designs of public and private works and also publishing numerous works on the subject of landscape architecture. In 1902 he opened a school of landscape architecture within his residence in New Rochelle, New York. He worked up until several months before his death. He died October 16, 1919, at Mount Vernon Hospital in Mount Vernon, New York, from throat cancer. His remaining projects and alterations to his projects were taken on by Olmsted Brothers and Jacques-Henri-Auguste Gréber, with whom he worked closely on many projects, and who were also rivals for work in his later years.

== Personal life ==
Barrett was married June 6, 1870, at Athens, Georgia, to Lucy Mildred Lampkin, the daughter of a Confederate officer and of the prominent Cobb family of Georgia. The couple had seven children, of which only one survived beyond his father. Lucy Mildred Barrett died May 30, 1886, after which Barrett married Clara Adele Weiss, the daughter of a prosperous Yonkers merchant. The couple had three children of which their son Dettmar died in an electrical accident in Rochelle Park at the age of 16.

== Major works ==
The following sites were major known projects of Nathan F. Barrett. He was known to have done projects as far west as California but many of his projects have not been recorded. Many of the sites below have been altered by later designers or demolished by developers.

=== Town and development plans ===
- Atlanta, GA (Peters Park failed development)
- Bergen Point, NJ
- Birmingham, AL
- Chevy Chase, MD
- Deal Lake, NJ
- Decatur, AL (a.k.a. New Decatur and Albany)
- Elberon, NJ
- Fort Worth, TX (North Fort Worth, currently known as Belmont Terrace)
- Pullman, IL
- Rochelle Park, New Rochelle, NY
- Winter Harbor, ME
- Yonkers, NY (Van Cortlandt Terrace development)

=== Country estates ===
- Ballingary, Spring Lake, NJ - for Martin Maloney (demolished)
- Bayberry Point, Islip, NY - for H. O. Havemeyer
- C. B. Alexander Residence, Tuxedo, NY
- Dunmere, Narragansett Pier, RI (house demolished, grounds and out-buildings remain)
- Fairlawn, Elberon, NJ - for George M. Pullman (demolished)
- F. D. Adams Residence, Seabright, NJ
- Hammersmith Farm, Newport, RI - for H.D. Auchincloss Sr.
- Hill Crest, Red Bank, NJ - for W.F. Havemeyer
- John Butler Residence, Pelham, NY
- Lynnewood Hall, Elkins Park, PA - for P.A.B. Widener
- Naumkeag, Stockbridge, MA - for Joseph H. Choate
- Norman B. Ream estate, Thompson, CT (house demolished, grounds remain)
- Oronoque, Stockbridge, MA - for Birdseye Blakeman
- Roslyn Hall, Wheatley Hills, NY - for Stanley Mortimer
- R. W. Lesley Residence, Haverford, PA - for Mrs. Robert W. Lesley
- Woodlea, Scarborough, NY - for Elliot F. Shepard and later Margaret Vanderbilt Shepard

=== Parks and cemeteries ===
- Arcade Park, Pullman, IL
- Branch Brook Park, Newark, NJ
- Delano Park, Decatur, AL
- Circle Park, Fort Worth, TX
- Hillsdale Cemetery, Anniston, AL
- Lordship Park, Stratford, CT
- The Palisade Interstate Park, NY and NJ
- The White City, 1893 World's Columbian Exposition, Chicago, IL (under direction of F.L. Olmsted)

=== Hotels/resorts ===
- Ponce-de-Leon Hotel, St. Augustine, FL (now Flagler College)
- Grindstone Inn, Grindstone Neck, Winter Harbor, ME

=== Other ===
- Actor's Home, West Brighton, NY (demolished)
