= Logan Square =

Logan Square may refer to:

- Logan Square, Chicago, a neighborhood on the north side of the city
- Logan Circle (Philadelphia) or Logan Square, a park in Philadelphia
  - Logan Square, Philadelphia, the surrounding neighborhood
