= Laird Schober Shoes =

Laird Schober Shoes began in 1870 in Philadelphia, United States as a small manufacturer of ladies', misses', and children' shoes by three young men in their mid-twenties. The company grew with sustained and measured increase until closing its doors in 1965.

== History ==
Samuel S. Laird, the senior partner, his brother-in-law George P. Schober, and their friend George A. Mitchell, were joined by Samuel's younger brother, John, in 1875. This is also the year that William S. Duling joined the company as a young designer. Duling worked tirelessly from the beginning and the company saw large increases as a result. The company expanded into all areas of the country and he helped to maintain the highest quality of output. The three men were equipped with all the necessary details of the business and its demands to guide its growth. Constantly adding new machines, including the McKay that could sew 100 pairs of soles onto women's shoes in one hour in 1858, and the Reese Buttonholer that made 100,000 button holes a week in 1891. Continuously taking on more responsibility and earning greater trust from the senior partners, Duling was made a partner himself in 1894. The company name was changed to Laird Schober & Co.

== Recognition ==
The craftsmanship, design and comfort of the latest technology led to increased recognition and prominence of Laird Schober shoes. The company won many awards at international expositions, and when a group of French shoemakers in 1921 were shown the handmade, microscopic stitches on the welts, they exclaimed "magnifique!". This was considered high praise because the French were deemed the best in the trade.

Laird Schober & Co. won the Franklin Institute Engineering Award in 1900, for Excellence in Manufacturing of shoes, collaborated with fashion designer Elsa Schiaparelli in 1938, and were sold in fine department stores like of Wanamaker's, and Strawbridge & Clothier of Philadelphia.

== See also ==
- Graham and Laird, Schober and Mitchell Factories
- Harris Building (Philadelphia, Pennsylvania)
