= William Gross =

William Gross, William Gros or Bill Gross may refer to:

- William Hickley Gross (1837–1898), American member of the Congregation of the Most Holy Redeemer, prelate of the Roman Catholic Church
- William Gross (murderer) (1796–1823), last person publicly executed in Philadelphia
- William le Gros, Earl of York (died 1179), the Count of Aumale (Earl of Albemarle), Earl of York, and Lord of Holderness
- William Gros (born 1992), French football striker
- William G. Gross (born 1964), American police officer, former commissioner of the Boston Police Department
- Bill H. Gross (born 1944), American investor, fund manager, and philanthropist who co-founded Pacific Investment Management Company
- Bill T. Gross (born 1958), American businessman, founder of Idealab, GNP Audio Video and eSolar

== See also ==
- William Grossart (1896–?), World War I flying ace
- Gross (surname)
