= Harris Building (Philadelphia, Pennsylvania) =

- U.S. National Register of Historic Places
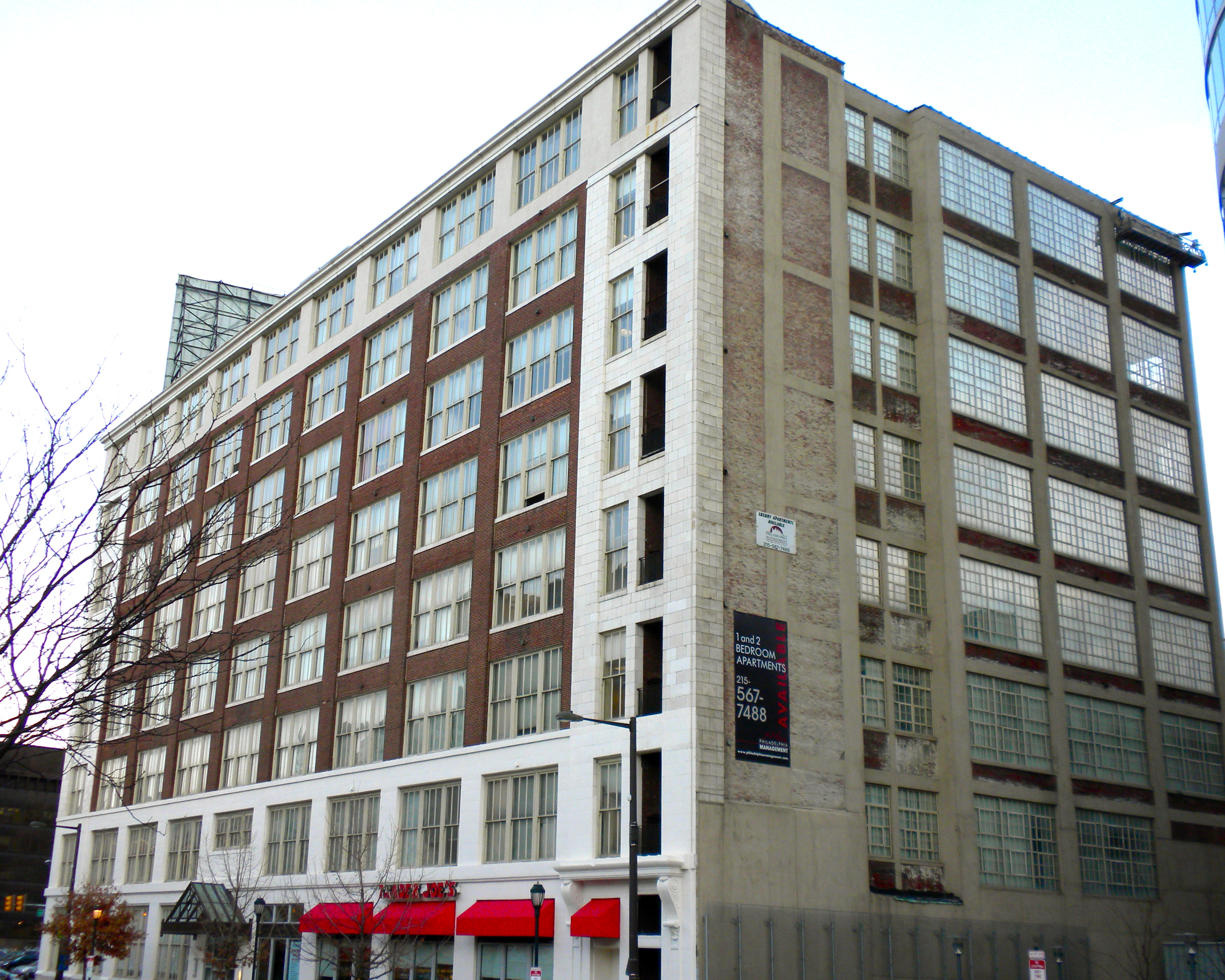
- Harris Building, February 2010

- Location within Philadelphia Location within Pennsylvania Location within the United States
- Location: 2131 Market St., Philadelphia, Pennsylvania
- Coordinates: 39°57′9″N 75°10′44″W
- Area: less than an acre
- Architect: Steele, William, & Sons Company
- NRHP reference No.: 01000928
- Added to NRHP: August 31, 2001

The Harris Building, also known as the Laird, Schober & Company Building, is an historic factory building which is located in the Logan Square neighborhood of Philadelphia, Pennsylvania.

It was added to the National Register of Historic Places in 2001.

== History and architectural features ==
Built between 1914 and 1915, this historic factory building is an eight-story, L-shaped, reinforced concrete building, which is clad in brick and has terra cotta details. From 1914 to 1942, it housed Laird, Schober & Company, a manufacturer of women's, children's, and misses' shoes. It then housed a clothing manufacturer until 1985.
