= Graham and Laird, Schober and Mitchell Factories =

- U.S. National Register of Historic Places
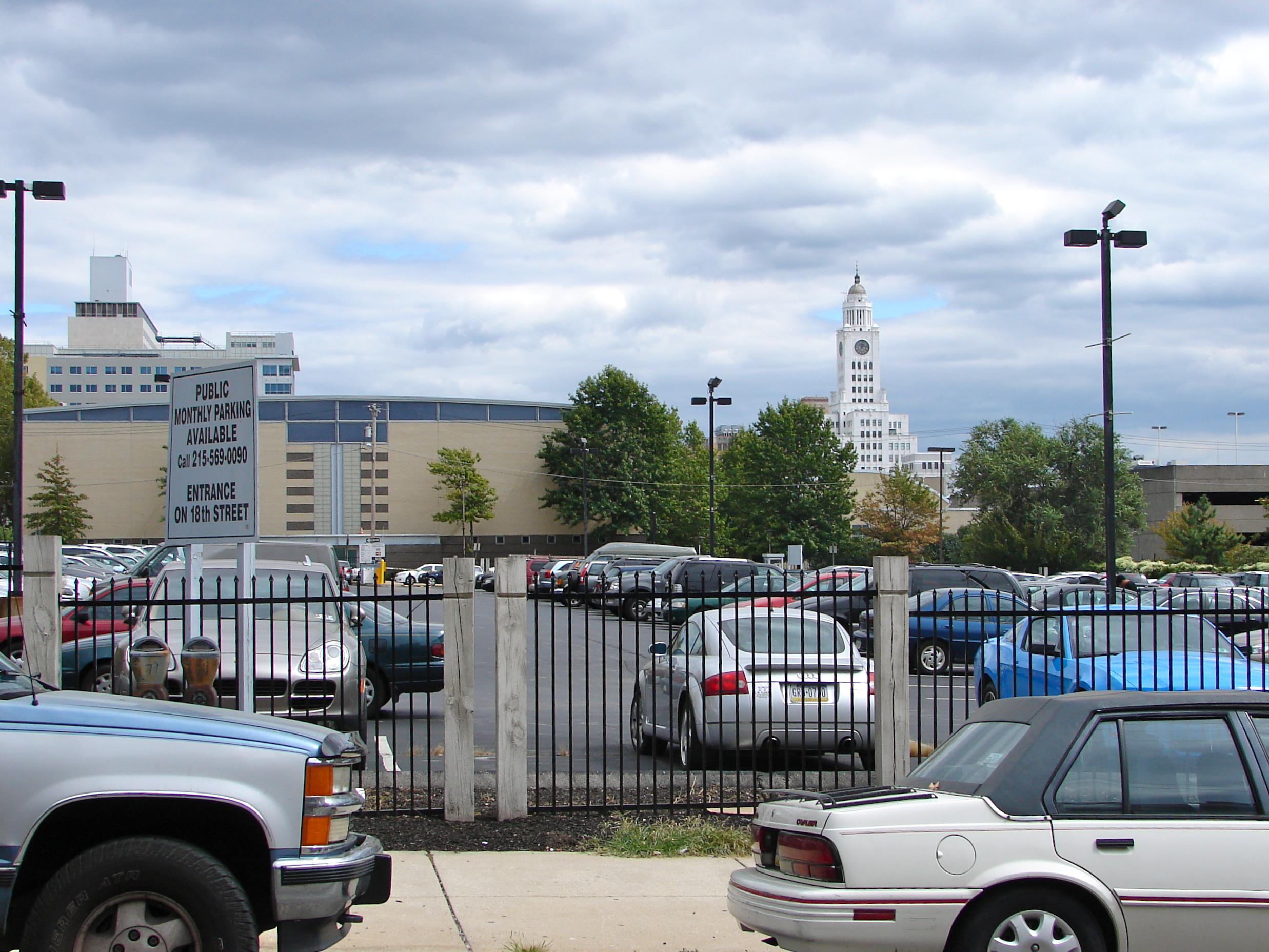
- Site of the Graham and Laird, Schober and Mitchell Factories, September 2010

- Location within Philadelphia Location within Pennsylvania Location within the United States
- Location: 19th St. between Hamilton and Buttonwood Sts., Philadelphia, Pennsylvania
- Coordinates: 39°57′44″N 75°10′11″W
- Area: 4 acres (1.6 ha)
- Built: 1885-1886, 1891
- Architect: Geisinger & Hales
- NRHP reference No.: 78002448
- Added to NRHP: July 7, 1978

The Graham and Laird, Schober and Mitchell Factories were two historic factory buildings that were located in the Franklintown neighborhood of Philadelphia, Pennsylvania.

They were added to the National Register of Historic Places in 1978. They have since been demolished.

== History and architectural features ==
The Graham factory was built between 1885 and 1886, and the Laird, Schober and Mitchell Factory was erected in 1891. Both were heavy timber framed brick buildings. The John C. Graham company made ladies dresses while the Laird, Schober and Mitchell made shoes.
