= Belber =

American leather goods company

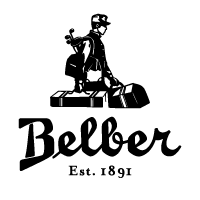
- Founded: 1891
- Founders: Aaron and Henry Belber
- Headquarters: 22nd Arch Street, Philadelphia, United States
- Products: Trunks, Luggage, Leather Goods, Handbags
- Website: www.belber.com

Belber is a heritage American leather goods company founded in Philadelphia in 1891.

== History ==
The Belber company was established in 1891. Its founders, Aaron and Henry Belber, scraped together $200 and started making luggage in a South Philadelphia basement. The Belber brothers, ages 14 and 17, worked 10 hours a day, six days a week, hand-stitching luggage.

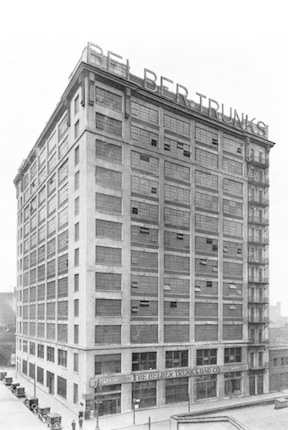
The Belber Building in Philadelphia

The Belber brothers opened their first factory in 1903. They were soon joined by their two other brothers, Herman and Maurice.

In 1919, the Belber Trunk and Bag Company acquired the Oshkosh Trunk Company and became one of the world's largest manufacturers of traveling goods.

In 1920, the company purchased the Larkin Building on Arch Street in Philadelphia to house its main office, a factory and a salesroom. In addition, Belber built a national network of production, distribution and direct sales by 1926, including manufacturing plants at Woodbury and Newark, New Jersey, Oshkosh and Wisconsin, as well as branch warehouses and offices in Pittsburgh, New York, Minneapolis, Chicago and San Francisco.

The Belber Trunk and Bag Company continued its expansion by acquiring the Schmit Bros. Trunk Company (which included the Eagle Trunk Company) in 1926 and the trunkmakers Innovation and Neverbreak in the 1930s.

In 1930, Belber moved its headquarters to Woodbury, New Jersey, into a building that used to house the Blasius piano factory. In 1947, Belber closed its plant in Philadelphia and transferred all its activities to Woodbury, New Jersey. In the 1950s, Belber's growth waned with the development of air travel and eventually went dormant in the middle of the 1970s.

In 2013, a group of entrepreneurs acquired Belber with plans to revive the brand.

In early 2016, a collection of bags and accessories was launched.

=== Innovations and patents ===
Between 1907 and 1935, Belber registered up to 80 patents in the U.S. for various technical product innovations.

Some of the patented Belber devices included the "Belber Safe Lock" enabling an easy opening and closing of the trunk, the "Belber Curtain Follower" (attached to the back of the trunk and holding firmly in place the garments by a rod inserted into a graduated ratchet) and multiple drawer locking devices.

Belber advertised in nationally circulated magazines, touting its luggage as "as modern as tomorrow".

=== Advertising ===
In the 1940s, to advertise its new collections, the Belber brothers also helped invent the concept of product tie-ins and product placement, partnering with Hollywood stars such as Ray Milland in the movie The Big Clock (film) and Alan Ladd in the movie Saigon (1948 film).

=== The Belber Building ===
Belber occupied the Larkin-Belber Building from 1920 to 1947. It was a large industrial facility with 4,430,000 cubic feet and 295,360 square feet of floor space on twelve floors located at 22nd St and Arch St in Philadelphia. Belber operated a showroom and a store on the first floor of the building while the rail spur off the Schuylkill Expressway linked the firm to its national market.

The firm hired local architect Leroy Berman Rothschild to place Belber's own stamp on the building. Rothshild designed large rooftop signs placed along the sides of the building. In its architecture as well as its integration of manufacturing, office work, and retail functions, the Belber Building represented a "landmark of twentieth century commerce and industry".

== See also ==
- Goyard
- Louis Vuitton
- Moynat
- Hartmann
- Mark Cross
