= Larkin–Belber Building =

- U.S. National Register of Historic Places
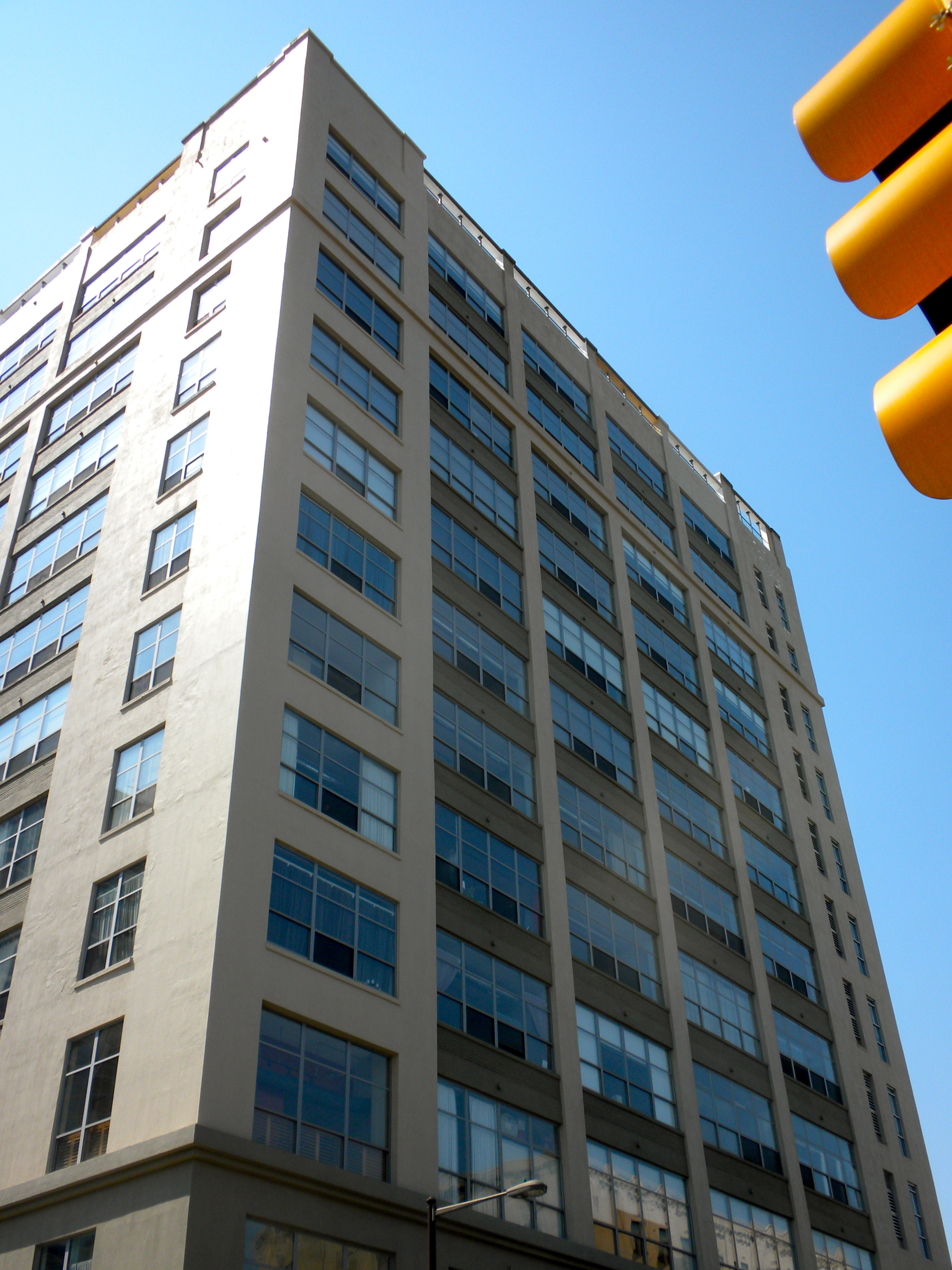
- Larkin–Belber Building, April 2010

- Location within Philadelphia Location within Pennsylvania Location within the United States
- Location: 2200-2218 Arch Street, Philadelphia, Pennsylvania
- Coordinates: 39°57′21″N 75°10′36″W
- Area: 1 acre (0.40 ha)
- Architect: Heckman, C.J.; Rothschild, Leroy B.
- Architectural style: Early Commercial
- NRHP reference No.: 03000077
- Added to NRHP: February 27, 2003

The Larkin–Belber Building, also known as the Larkin Building and the Belber Trunk & Bag Company Building, is an historic light manufacturing loft building in the Logan Square neighborhood of Philadelphia, Pennsylvania, US.

It was added to the National Register of Historic Places in 2003.

== History ==
Built between 1912 and 1913, this historic structure is a twelve-story, reinforced concrete building with 295,360 square feet of floor space. It was originally designed by Buffalo architect C.J. Heckman for Larkin Company, a soapmaker.

In 1920, Belber purchased the building. The company subsequently hired local architect Leroy Berman Rothschild to place Belber's own stamp on the building. Rothshild designed large rooftop signs placed along the sides of the building. In its architecture as well as its integration of manufacturing, office work, and retail functions, the Belber Building represented a "landmark of twentieth century commerce and industry."

Belber vacated the property in 1947 and Robert Hall Clothes took over the building in order to use it for production. Later, for a few years, up until 1964, the building was leased to the Philadelphia Daily News. In 1983, a developer acquired the building for a conversion to office space; however, those plans did not materialize.

By 2004, the building had maintenance problems that led to pieces breaking off and falling onto the street. Orens Brothers Inc. acquired the property and converted it to condominiums.

== See also ==
- National Register of Historic Places listings in Center City, Philadelphia

== Gallery ==
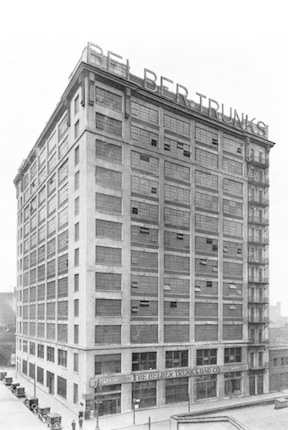
Belber Building, 1921
