= Wesley Building (Philadelphia) =

- Wesley Building (Robert Morris Hotel)
- U.S. National Register of Historic Places
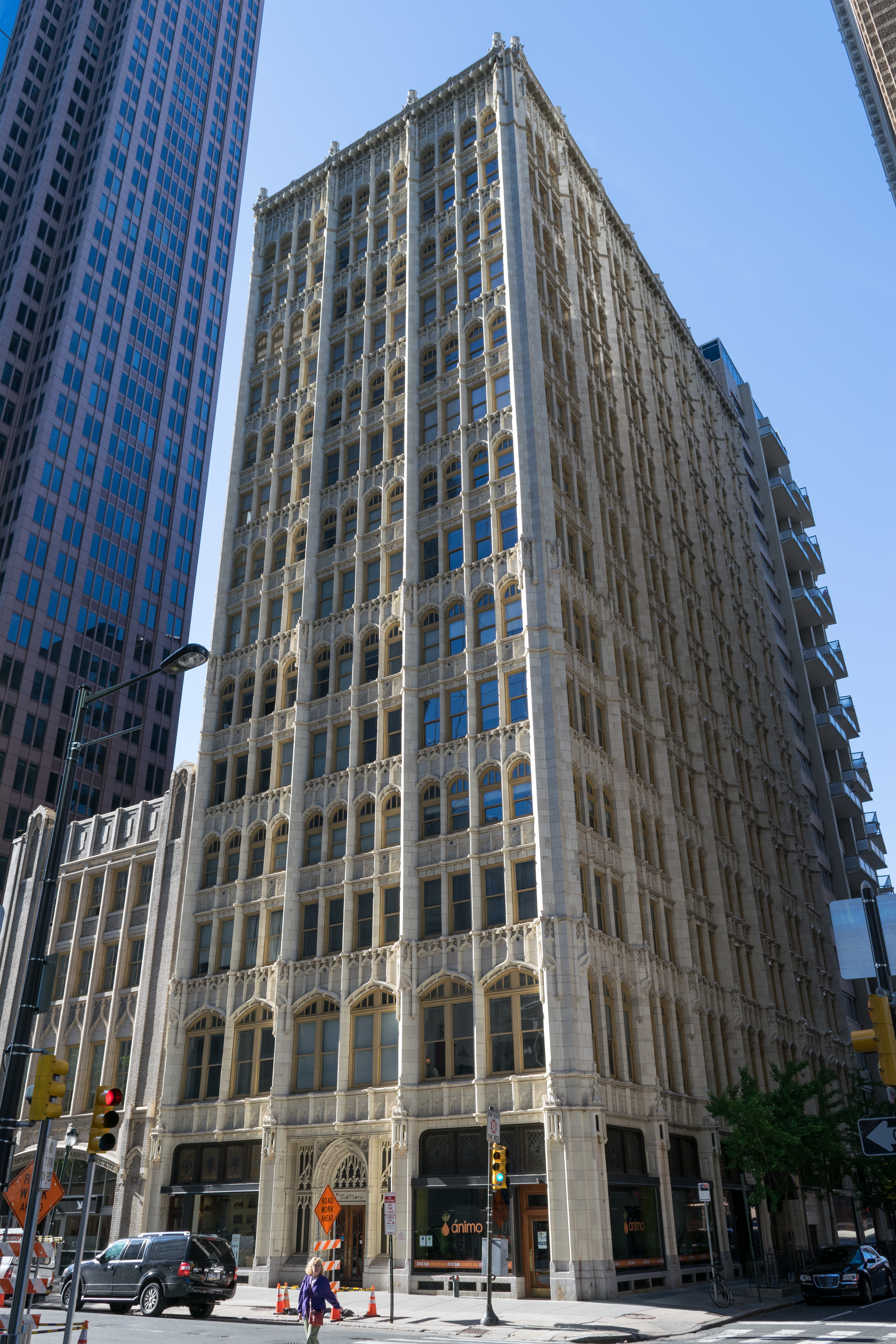
- (2015)

- Location within Philadelphia Location within Pennsylvania Location within the United States
- Location: 1705 Arch St. Philadelphia, Pennsylvania
- Coordinates: 39°57′17″N 75°10′8″W
- Built: 1914-15, 1921-22
- Architect: Ballinger & Perot; Ballinger Co.
- Architectural style: Gothic Revival
- NRHP reference No.: 84003581
- Added to NRHP: May 10, 1984

The Wesley Building, also known as the Robert Morris Hotel, is an historic office building and hotel located at 1705 Arch Street, at the corner of N. 17th Street in the Logan Square neighborhood of Philadelphia, Pennsylvania, United States. The original six-story section was built in 1914 and 1915, with an eight-story addition erected in 1921 and 1922. The cornice of the original building can still be seen above the sixth floor.

The Wesley Building was added to the National Register of Historic Places in 1984.

== History and architectural features ==
This building was commissioned by the Board of Home Missions of the United Methodist Church as offices and a hotel for the Methodist Church. It was designed by Ballinger & Perot in the Gothic Revival style and features intricate terra cotta detailing.

Located directly across Arch Street from the fifty-eight-story Comcast Center, the tallest building in Pennsylvania, the now century-old structure was converted in 2012 to a 111-unit rental apartment building called "The Arch Luxury Apartments".

== Gallery ==
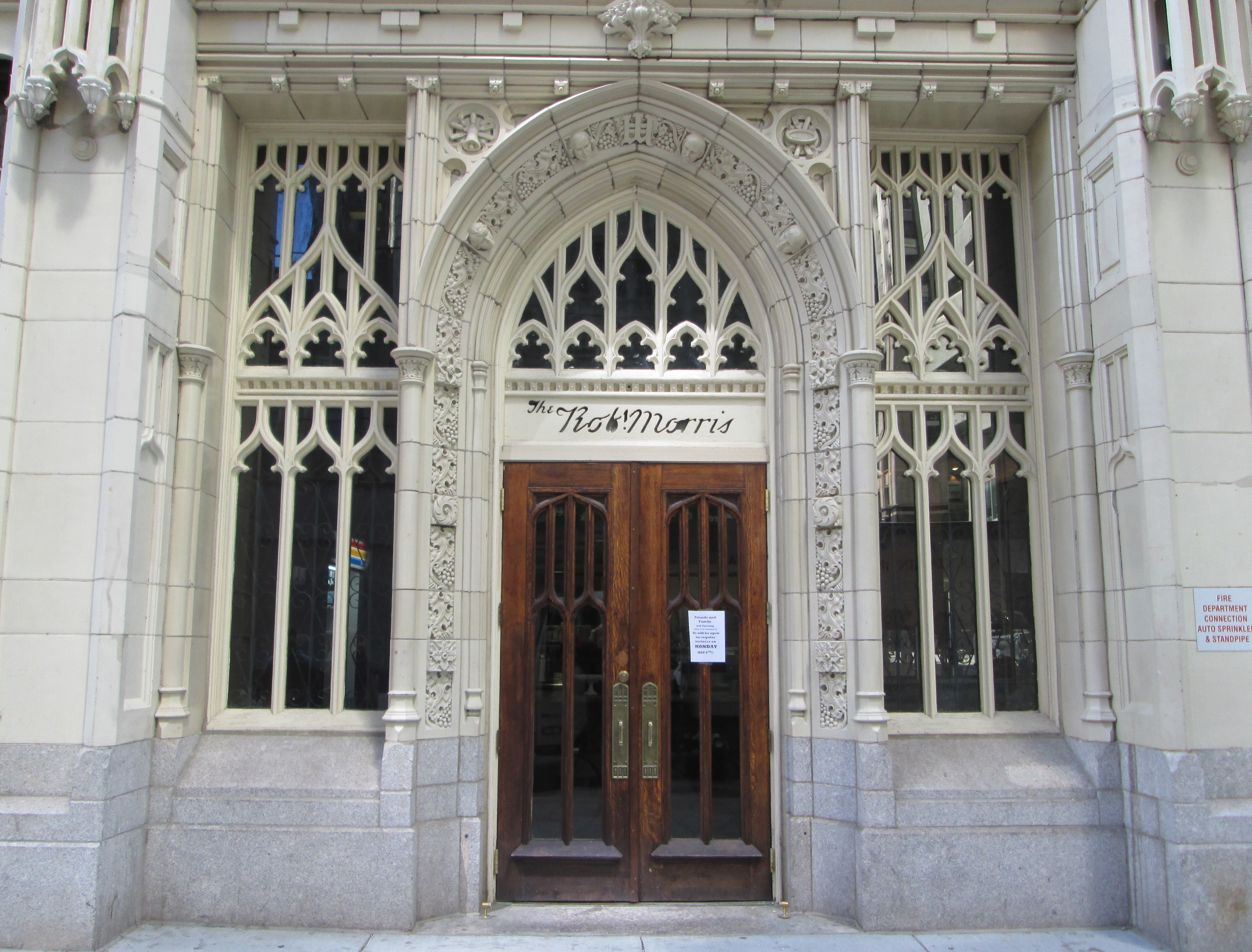
Entrance on Arch Street

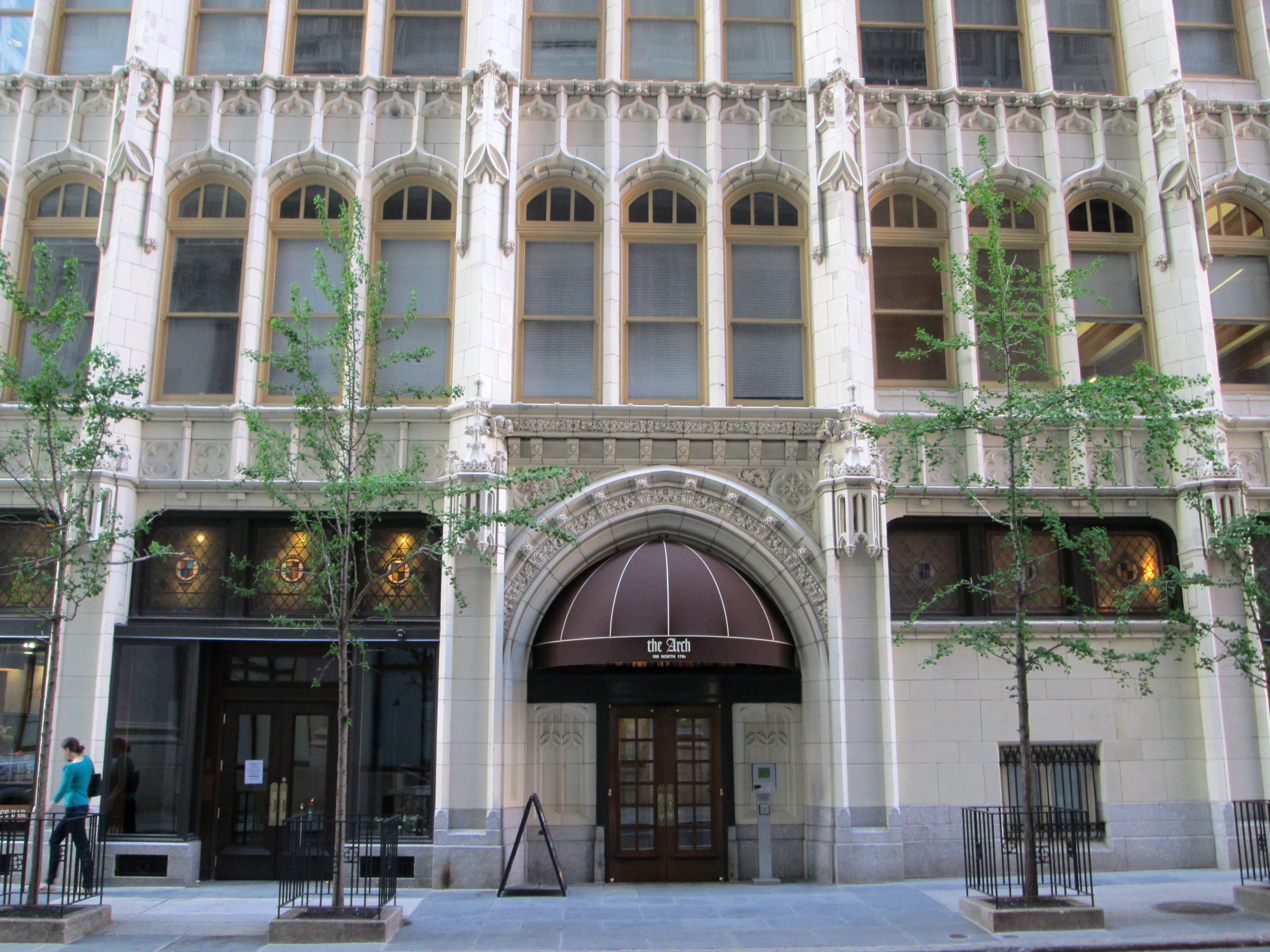
The 17th Street facade

== See also ==
- National Register of Historic Places listings in Center City, Philadelphia
