= Bell Telephone Company Building (Philadelphia) =

- U.S. National Register of Historic Places
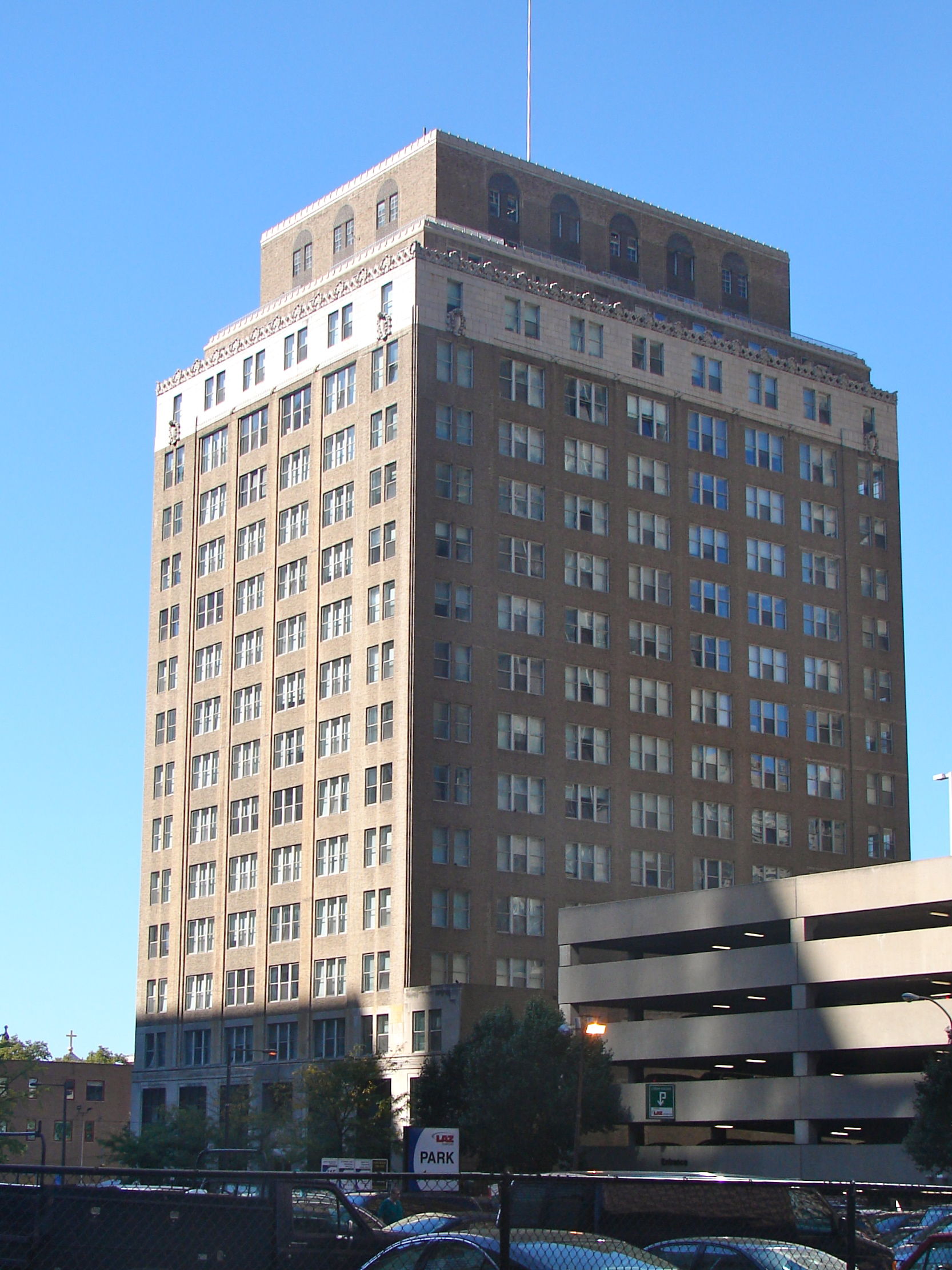
- Bell Telephone Company Building in Philadelphia

- Location within Philadelphia Location within Pennsylvania Location within the United States
- Location: 1835 Arch Street, Philadelphia, Pennsylvania, U.S.
- Coordinates: 39.9557°N 75.1708°W
- Area: 1 acre (0.40 ha)
- Built: 1925
- Architect: Stopper, Eugene; Zantzinger and Borie
- Architectural style: Moderne
- NRHP reference No.: 00000849
- Added to NRHP: August 07, 2000

The Bell Telephone Company Building is a historic 17 story skyscraper located at 1835 Arch Street in the Logan Square neighborhood on the edge of downtown Philadelphia, Pennsylvania which was used as a long distance telephone exchange by the Bell Telephone Company. Its construction in 1925 marked the beginning of the era of long distance trunk lines in telephone communication. The building was listed by the National Register of Historic Places in 2000.

== History ==
Though this is considered the most prestigious building designed by architect Eugene Stopper, he was perhaps uniquely qualified to design this building. His background designing banks is reflected in the customer service areas that dominates the first floor, and his experience designing industrial buildings in reinforced concrete, is reflected the upper floors where the telephone exchanges were housed.

The building is constructed in the Moderne style of brick with limestone used on the first and fourteenth floors. The three upper floors are set-back in the style of New York skyscrapers of the era. The first floor interior is decorated with marble walls, terrazzo floors, and the company's iconic Bell trade-mark.

The introduction of long distance trunk lines in the early 1920s caused a boom in telephone traffic, requiring many new switchboards and telephone operators. Philadelphia was a key location in this development, being about halfway between New York City and Washington, D.C., and being the departure point for the trunk line to Chicago, which followed the Pennsylvania Railroad's Main Line westward. The company constructed a series of new buildings with unimaginative names to house the long distance business, including New York's Telephone Building and the St. Louis Telephone Building, which were both built about 1926, and the Ohio Bell Telephone Building in Cleveland and the New Jersey Bell Telephone Building in Newark, both completed before 1930. The New York and New Jersey buildings are also listed on the NRHP, and the Cleveland building is a contributing building to a NRHP Historic District.

The trunk lines were placed close to Philadelphia's fairly new downtown area, which developed around City Hall rather than the older business area to the east. Once placed, the location of the trunk lines dictated the location of other Bell Telephone buildings which needed easy access to the lines. The company's 1950 stainless steel skyscraper at 16th and Cherry Streets, and the 1991 Bell Atlantic Tower at 18th and Arch Streets both follow this pattern.

In 1970, the long distance exchanges were moved to a modern facility, the building was renovated as telephone company offices, and air conditioning was installed. About 1990, the building was sold and converted to use as a self-storage facility and sold again in 2001 for use as apartments.
