= Logan Square, Philadelphia =

Logan Square
- Neighborhood of Philadelphia
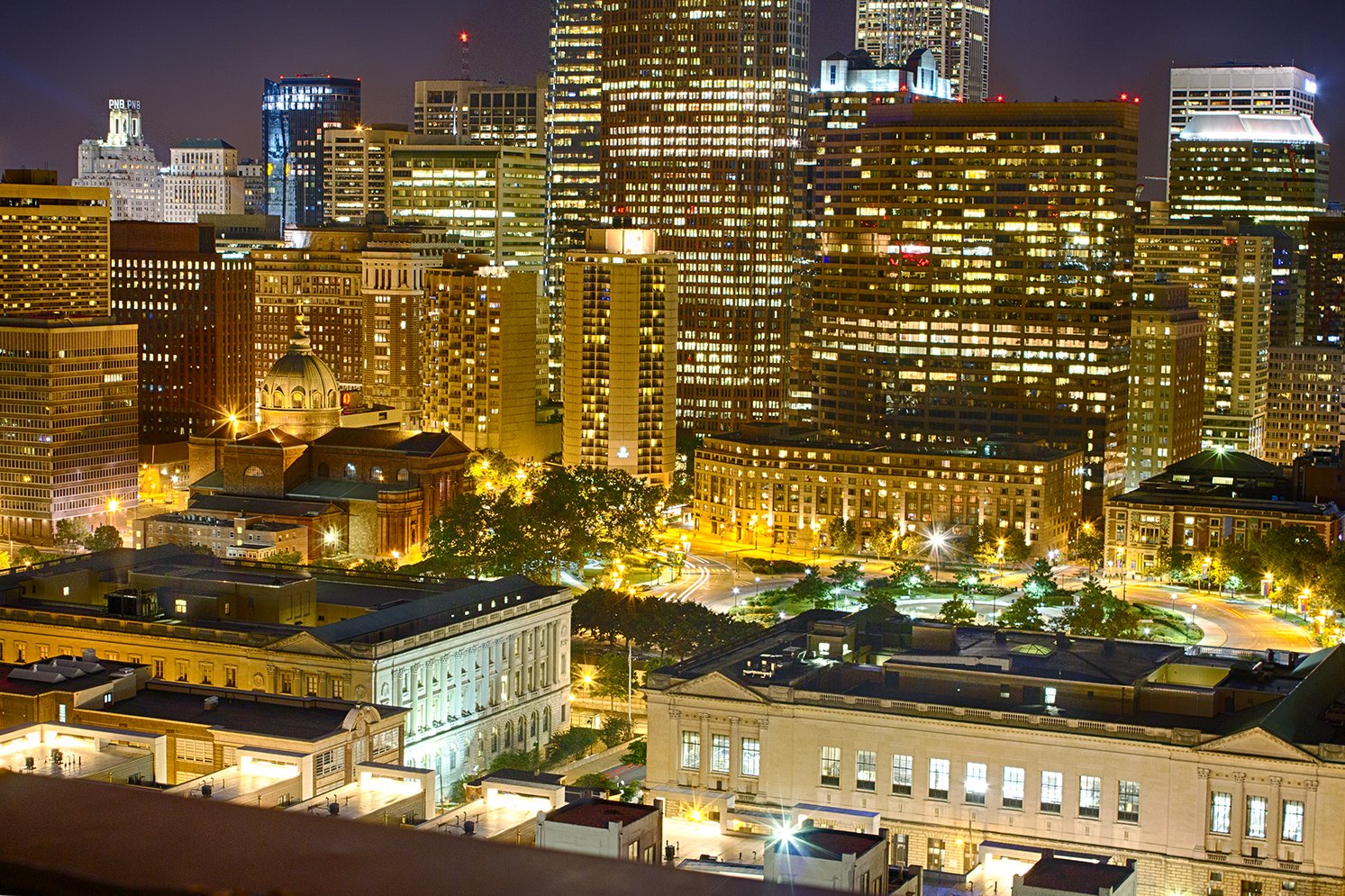
- Logan Circle, the center of Logan Square, in June 2014

- Location within Philadelphia
- Country: United States
- State: Pennsylvania
- County: Philadelphia
- City: Philadelphia
- Area codes: 215, 267 and 445

Logan Square is a neighborhood in Philadelphia, Pennsylvania, United States. Bounded by Market Street on the south, Spring Garden Street on the north, Broad Street on the east, and the Schuylkill River on the west, it occupies the northwestern quadrant of Center City. The square for which it is named is one of the five squares central to William Penn's design for Philadelphia. Originally called Northwest Square, it was renamed in honor of James Logan, an 18th-century mayor of Philadelphia.

A number of locations in Logan Square have been named to the National Register of Historic Places, including the Arch Street Presbyterian Church, the Bell Telephone Company Building, the Board of Education Building, the Cathedral of Saints Peter and Paul, the Harris Building, the Insurance Company of North America Building, the Larkin–Belber Building, Logan Square, St. Clement's Protestant Episcopal Church, the Inquirer Building, and the Wesley Building.

Other notable Logan Square sites include the Academy of Natural Sciences, the Barnes Foundation, the Franklin Institute, the Moore College of Art and Design, the Parkway Central Library, the Pennsylvania Horticultural Society, the Philadelphia Mormon Temple, Matthias Baldwin Park, and the main campus of the Community College of Philadelphia. Penn Center, Franklintown, and much of Philadelphia's central business district are located in Logan Square.

== Education ==
Residents are in the Albert M. Greenfield School catchment area for grades Kindergarten through eight; all persons assigned to Greenfield are zoned to Benjamin Franklin High School. Previously South Philadelphia High School was the neighborhood's zoned high school.

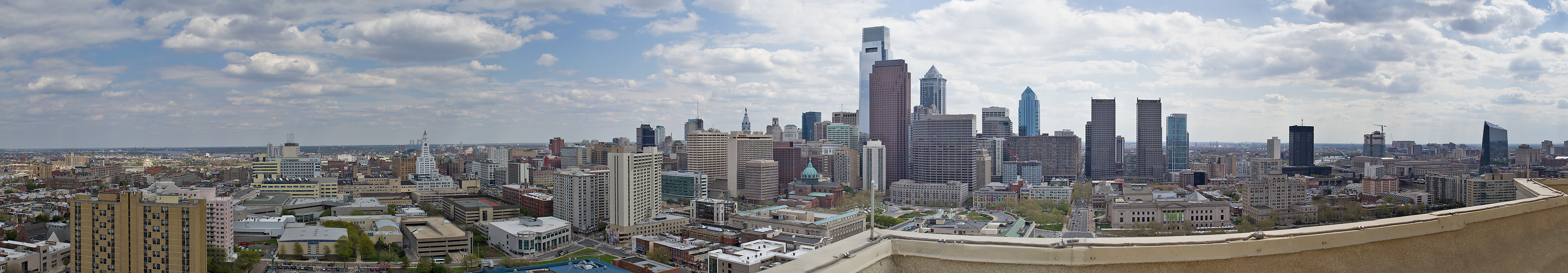
Panorama of Logan Square in May 2014 with Spring Garden (left), Cathedral Basilica, Logan Circle, and the Franklin Institute (center), and 30th Street Station, while not part of Logan Square, (right)
