= William Gross (murderer) =

American murderer (1796–1823)

- Born: January 1, 1796
- Died: February 7, 1823 (aged 27); Logan Circle, Pennsylvania United States
- Cause of death: Execution by hanging
- Conviction: First degree murder
- Penalty: Death

Details
- Country: United States
- State: Pennsylvania

William Gross (January 1, 1796 – February 7, 1823) was the last person to be publicly executed in Philadelphia, Pennsylvania. He was hanged at the current location of Logan Circle.

== Life ==
William Gross was raised an orphan. As an adult he had gambling and other vices. Gross, in his own words, had kept "bad company".

=== Death ===
In 1822, Gross stabbed his mistress Kesiah Stow (also spelled Keziah) to death after an argument with her regarding her lifestyle. He was quickly apprehended and found guilty of murder. His death warrant was signed on January 10, 1823.

Gross showed remorse for his actions and was repentant. On February 7, 1823, Gross was executed by hanging at the current location of Logan Circle. He was described as calm and resigned to his fate. His last words were used to speak against "vice" and "sin". Gross also refused a drink on the scaffold. He was 27 at the time of his death. Some sources allege the execution occurred on February 17, 1823.

Prior to Gross's execution at least 108 men and 4 women had been hanged in Philadelphia. However, by the 1820s public perception in the city toward criminal punishment had shifted from physical coercion and public humiliation to redemption and rehabilitation through confinement. Gross became the last person publicly executed in Philadelphia.
