= Logan Circle (Philadelphia) =

- Logan Square
- U.S. National Register of Historic Places
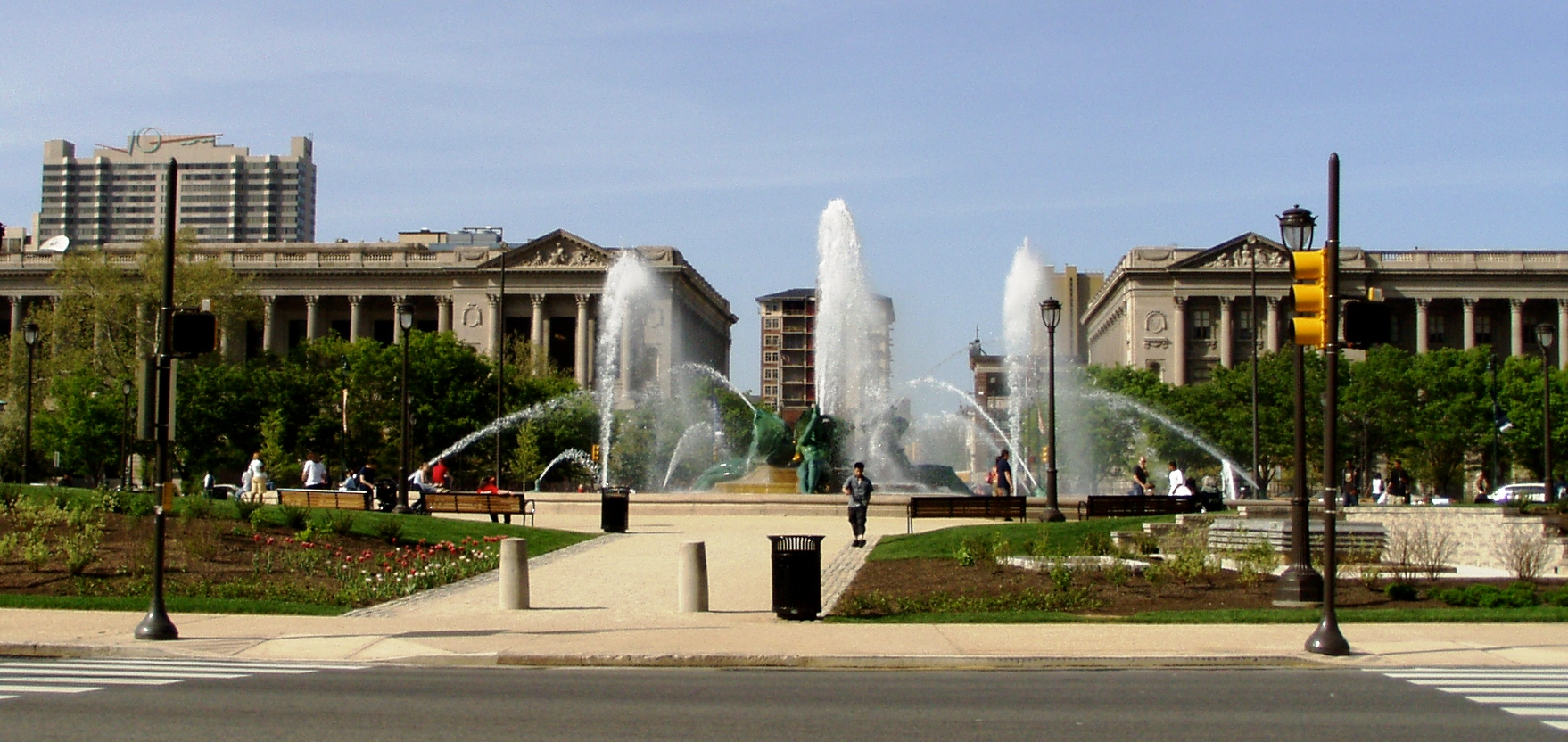
- Swann Memorial Fountain in Logan Circle

- Location within Philadelphia Location within Pennsylvania Location within the United States
- Location: Philadelphia, Pennsylvania, U.S.
- Coordinates: 39°57′28.16″N 75°10′15.35″W
- Built: 1684
- Architect: Thomas Holme; Jacques Greber
- MPS: Four Public Squares of Philadelphia TR
- NRHP reference No.: 81000555
- Added to NRHP: September 14, 1981

Logan Circle, also known as Logan Square, is an open-space park in Center City Philadelphia's northwest quadrant and one of the five original planned squares laid out on the city grid. The centerpiece of the park is the Logan Circle, a circular area centered on a large water feature, bounded by a traffic circle carrying 19th Street and the Benjamin Franklin Parkway with connections to 18th and 20th streets to the east and west and Race and Vine Streets to the south and north.

The circle exists within the original bounds of the square; the names Logan Square and Logan Circle are used interchangeably when referring to the park. Originally "Northwest Square" in William Penn's 1684 plan for the city, the square was renamed in 1825 after Philadelphia statesman James Logan. The park is the focal point of the eponymous neighborhood.

Logan Square was added to the National Register of Historic Places in 1981.

== History ==
=== 19th century ===
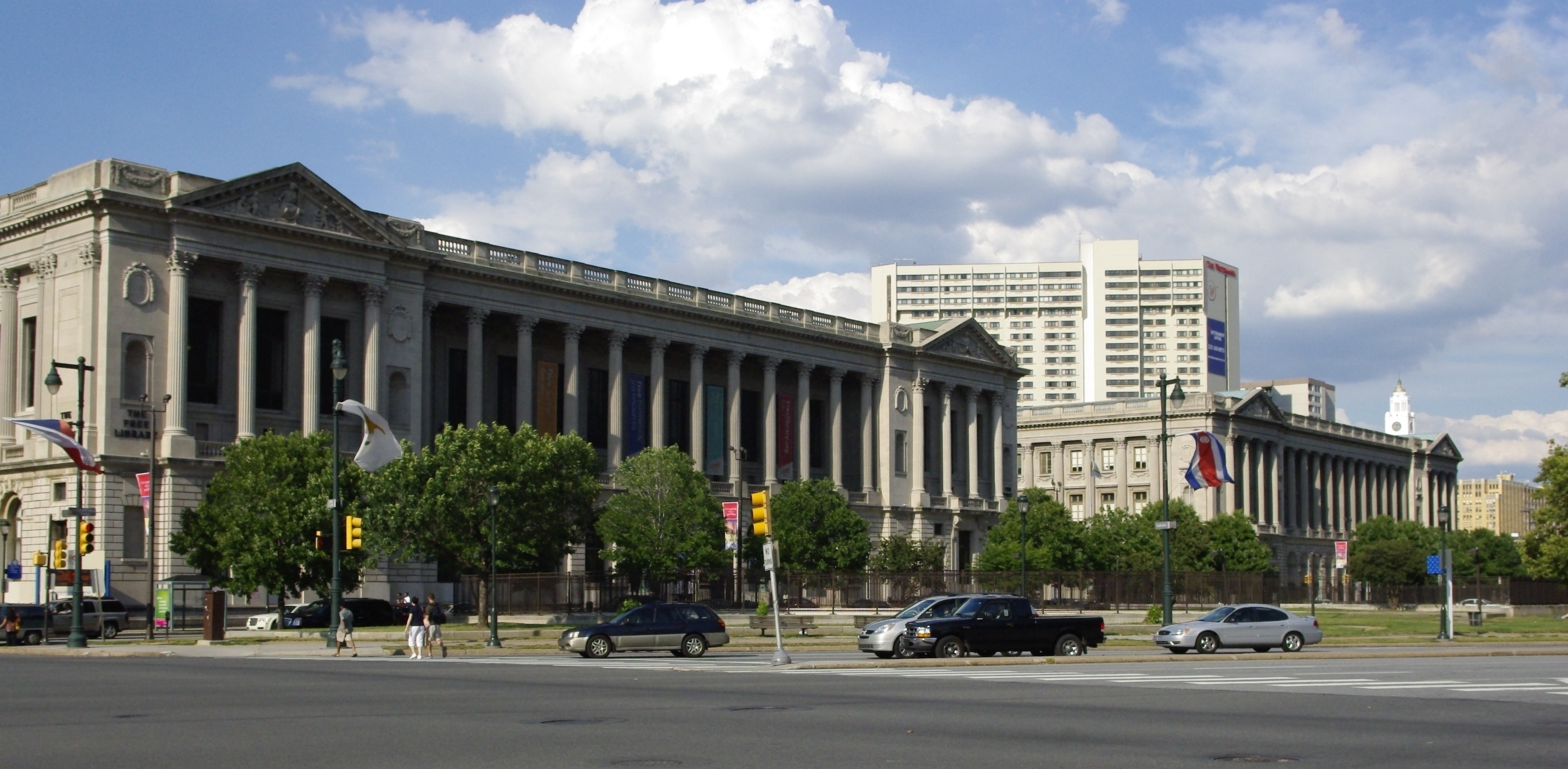
Parkway Central Library and Philadelphia's Family Court Building

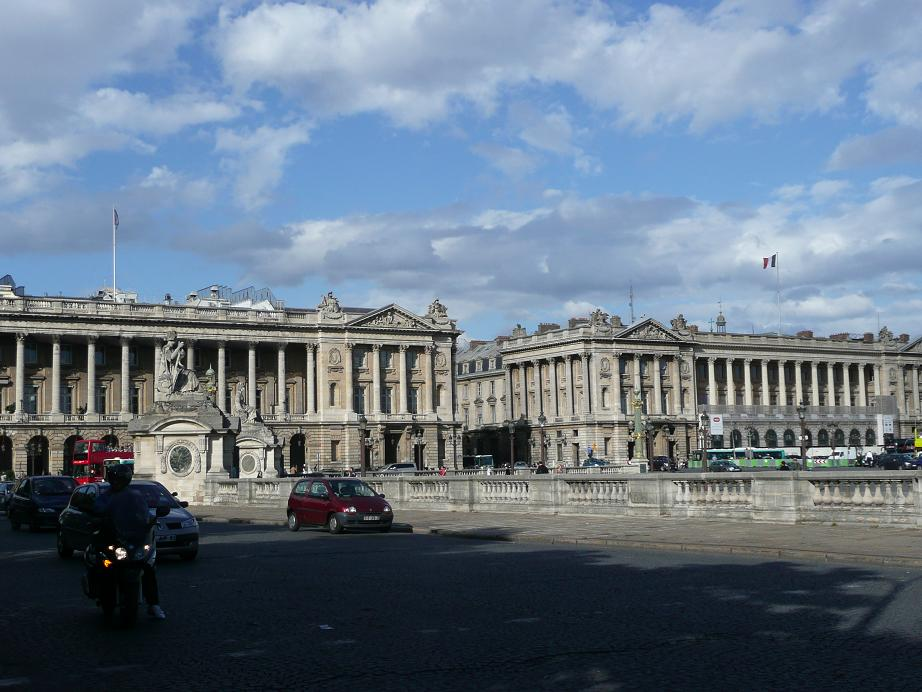
Both buildings were modeled after the Hôtel de Crillon, and the Hôtel de la Marine Place de la Concorde in Paris

Prior to the 1800s the city developed along the Delaware River, leaving the area around Logan Square as untouched forest through the American Revolution. Over the next quarter century the square served as a pasture, graveyard, and execution grounds which hosted a gallows until the hanging of William Gross on February 7, 1823. The City of Philadelphia leased the square to the Orphans' Society from 1821 to 1830. While some have suggested that the lease for a “good and noble purpose” was an aim at redirecting public attention away from its previous morbid use following Gross’s death, that is probably revisionist since the lease was executed two full years prior to the last public hanging in the “city of brotherly love”.

In 1842, an ordinance “made it an offense to drive or take into Logan, Penn, or Rittenhouse squares any ‘horse, cow, cart, wagon, carriage or wheelbarrow, except by permission, or place any wood, coal, rubbish, carrion, or offensive matter within either [sic] of the squares, or to climb on the trees, fences or gates . . . or to dig up the soil or injure the grass, or to run or walk over or lie on the same.’” By the 1840s Philadelphia had begun a restoration of the square from its former days as a graveyard, lining the walks with trees, planting greenery and shrubbery, and constructing a wooden fence allowing the square to resemble Penn's vision of an urban green space. During this period, the city limited access to Logan Square to homeowners with property connected to the square who paid for its upkeep; the city constructed a wrought iron fence around the square in 1852.

In 1864, the square was the site of the Great Sanitary Fair, a fundraising event in support of the United States Sanitary Commission to help raise money, support, and buy medicine for the Union troops during the American Civil War. President Abraham Lincoln visited the fair and donated forty-eight signed copies of the Emancipation Proclamation, which sold for $10 each. In 1881 the Pennsylvania Railroad constructed a viaduct that disconnected Logan Square and Rittenhouse Square, altering William Penn’s original plan of connectivity between the city's five squares.

The square was used as a location for concerts and other community events.

Since the 1890s, the city had envisioned constructing of a boulevard similar to the Parisian Champs-Élysées.

=== 20th century ===
In 1907, the plans were approved. The square began to transform again: the original bounds of the square were 18th Street to the east, 20th Street to the west, Race Street to the south, and Vine Street to the north remain intact, and the square began to more closely resemble its appearance today, distinguished by its circle.

Construction began in 1917 on a plan to connect Center City with Fairmount Park which later became a segment of Benjamin Franklin Parkway. It was designed by Jacques Gréber, a French landscape architect who converted Logan Square into a circle similar to the oval of the Place de la Concorde in Paris. Philadelphia even modeled its Free Library and Family Court Building after the twin buildings of the Hôtel de Crillon and the Hôtel de la Marine in Paris.

Among the sites in its immediate vicinity are the Swann Memorial Fountain at the center of the circle, Parkway Central Library, the former Philadelphia Family Court Building, the Academy of Natural Sciences, the Franklin Institute, Moore College of Art and Design, the Roman Catholic Cathedral-Basilica of Sts. Peter and Paul, and the Mormon Philadelphia Pennsylvania Temple.

=== 21st century ===
In early 2005, the Pennsylvania Horticultural Society (PHS) began efforts to clean up and redevelop the park to make it more accessible and inviting to pedestrians. Most noticeably the large paulownia trees that featured prominently round the fountain were removed. City planners with PHS had determined that they had reached the end of their life span and had become an eyesore. They were replaced with similar trees grown especially for Logan Square at Longwood Gardens as part of a larger plan to improve the space. PHS planted lush perennial gardens around the fountain and adjacent parcels and maintain the gardens throughout the year.

The city undertook an extensive rehabilitation plan and by 2012 the city had refurbished the original squares with restoration and new greenery bringing the Parkway’s entertainment capabilities full-circle.

The city has expressed support of transitioning the circle back into a square, and increasing its aesthetic nature as an urban green space.

== Events ==
When Pope John Paul II visited the city in 1979, he celebrated mass in the plaza on October 3, 1979.

To commemorate the end of every school year since the 1960s, the newly appointed Sophomores, Juniors, and Seniors of J. W. Hallahan Catholic Girls High School jump into the fountain. The event is the subject of much local media coverage throughout Philadelphia.

In 2016, it was the starting location for the Women's March on Philadelphia.

In April 2017, Logan Circle hosted the 2017 NFL draft.

== In popular culture ==
- The band The Wonder Years has a song named after Logan Circle on their album The Upsides.
- The emo band Algernon Cadwallader's song "Spit Fountain" references the statues in Swann Fountain.

== Gallery ==
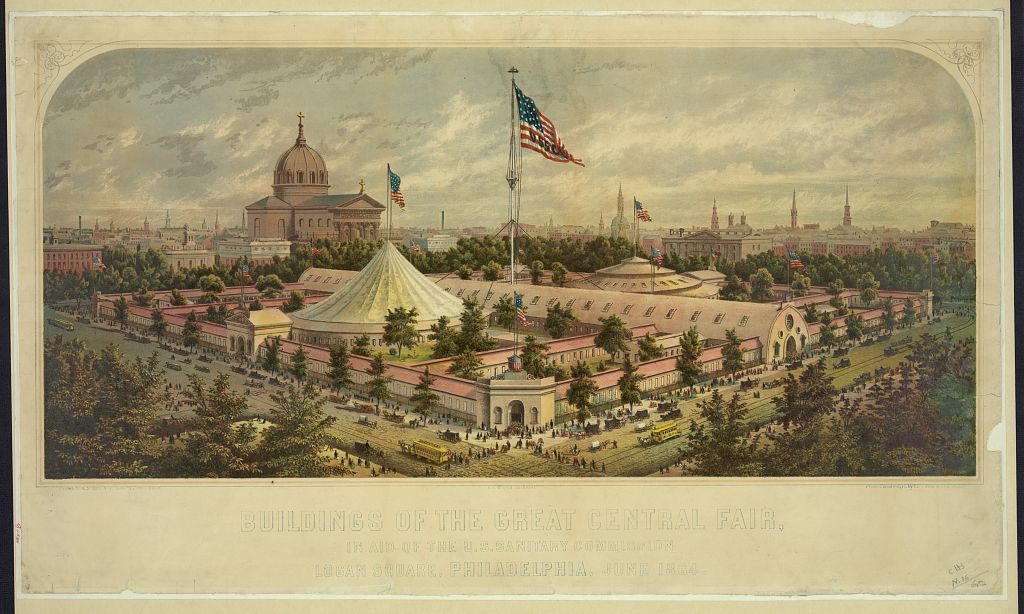
Great Sanitary Fair, June 1864.

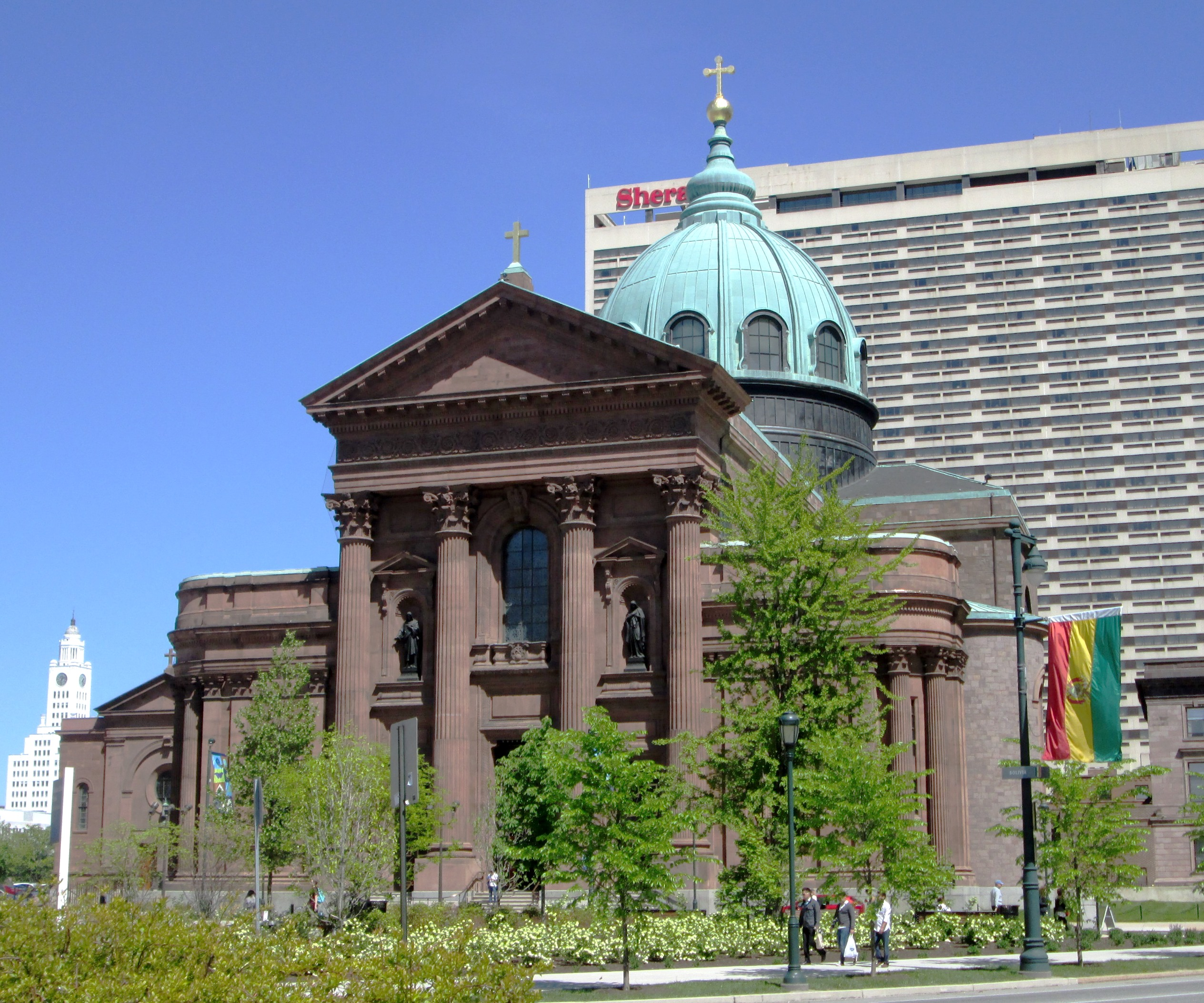
Cathedral Basilica of Saints Peter and Paul (1846–64).

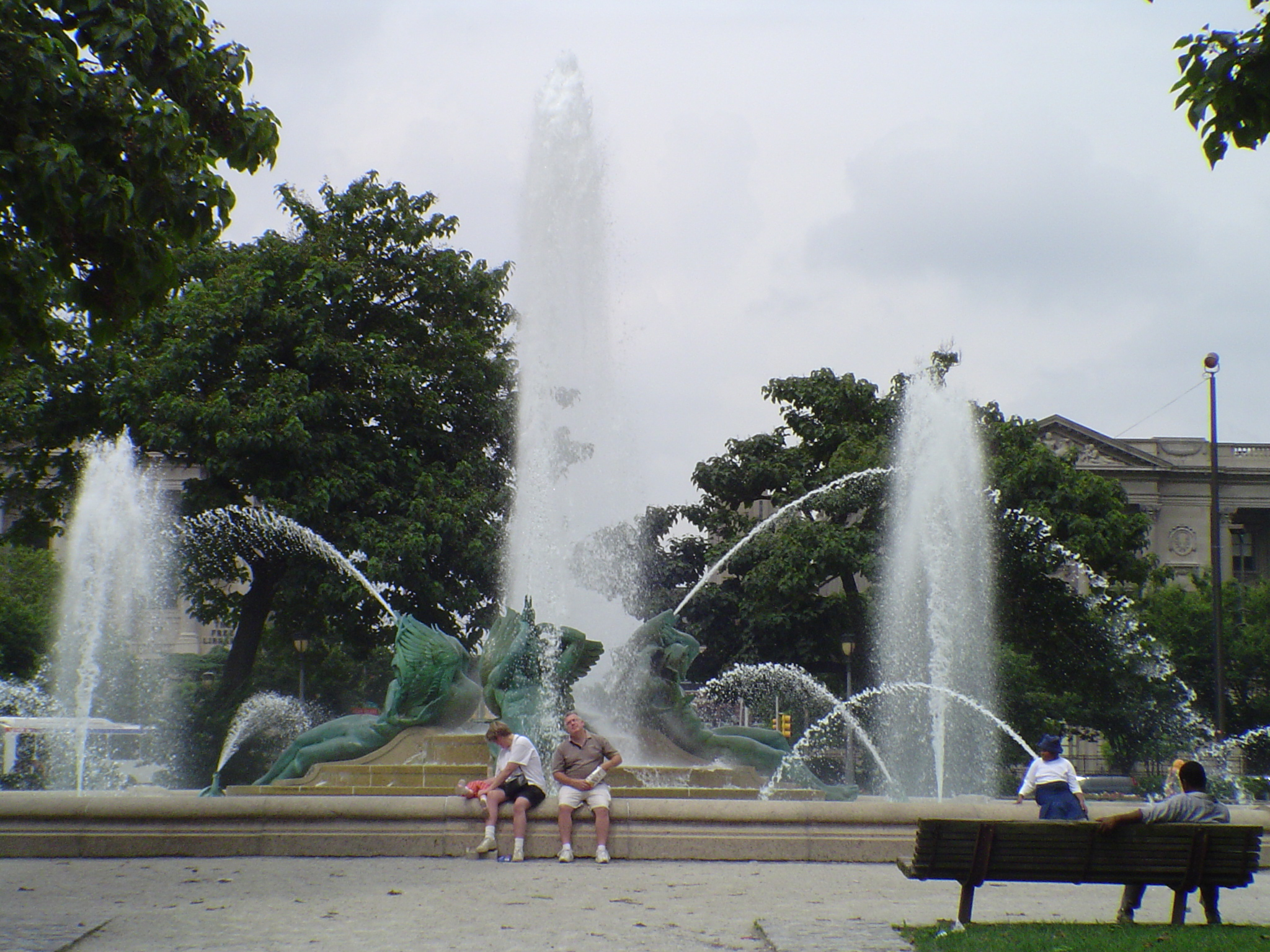
Swann Memorial Fountain

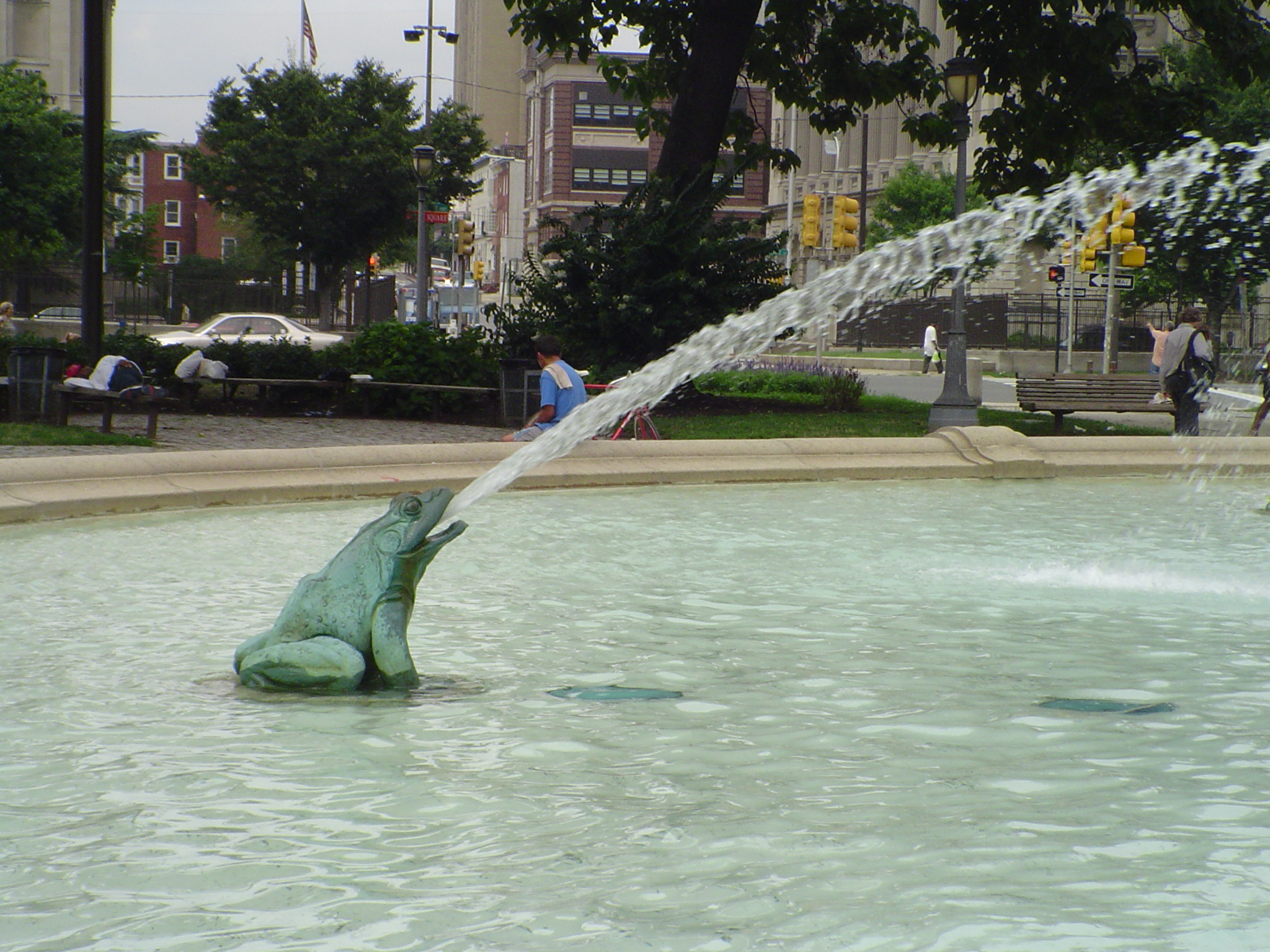
North Side

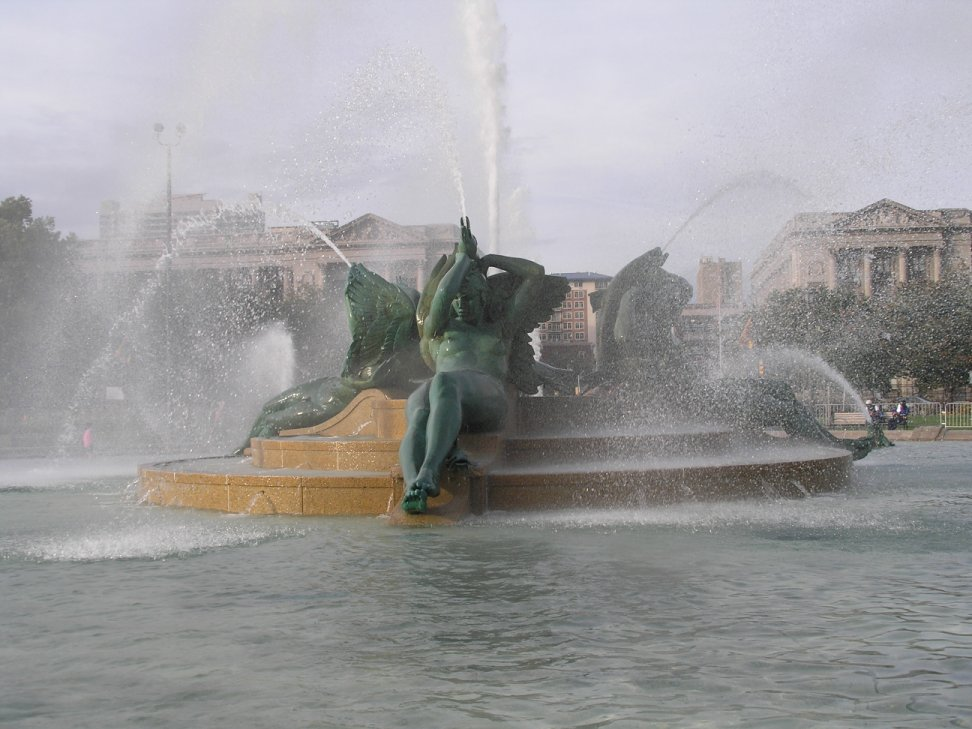
South Side

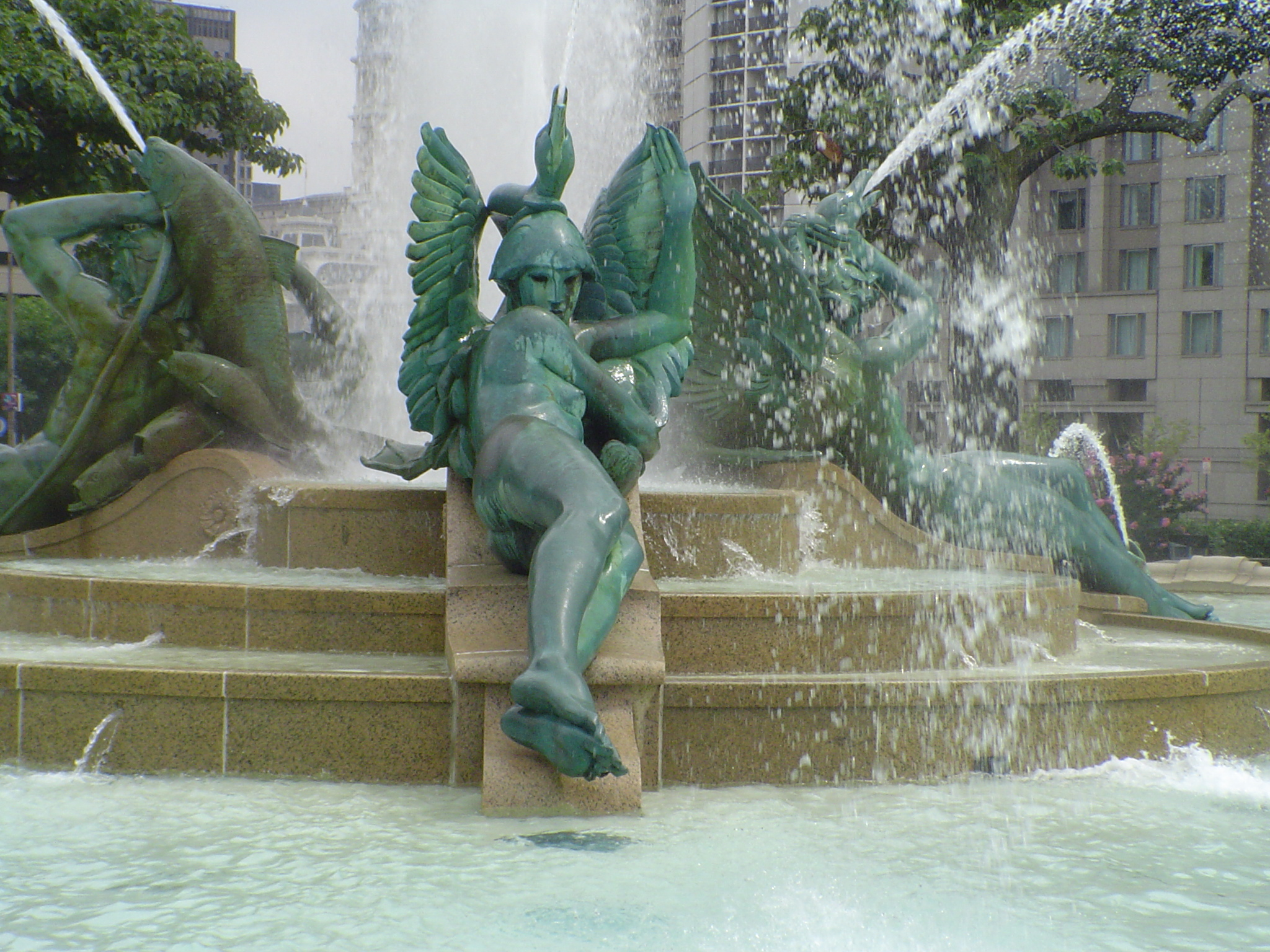
West Side

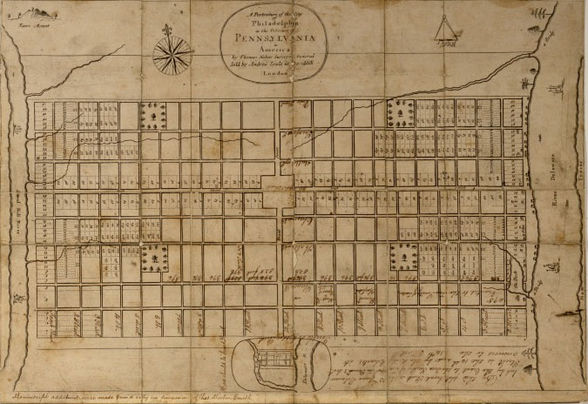
Thomas Holme's Portraiture of the City of Philadelphia

== See also ==
- List of parks in Philadelphia
- Franklin Square
- Rittenhouse Square
- Washington Square
