= Buttonholer =

Sewing machine attachment

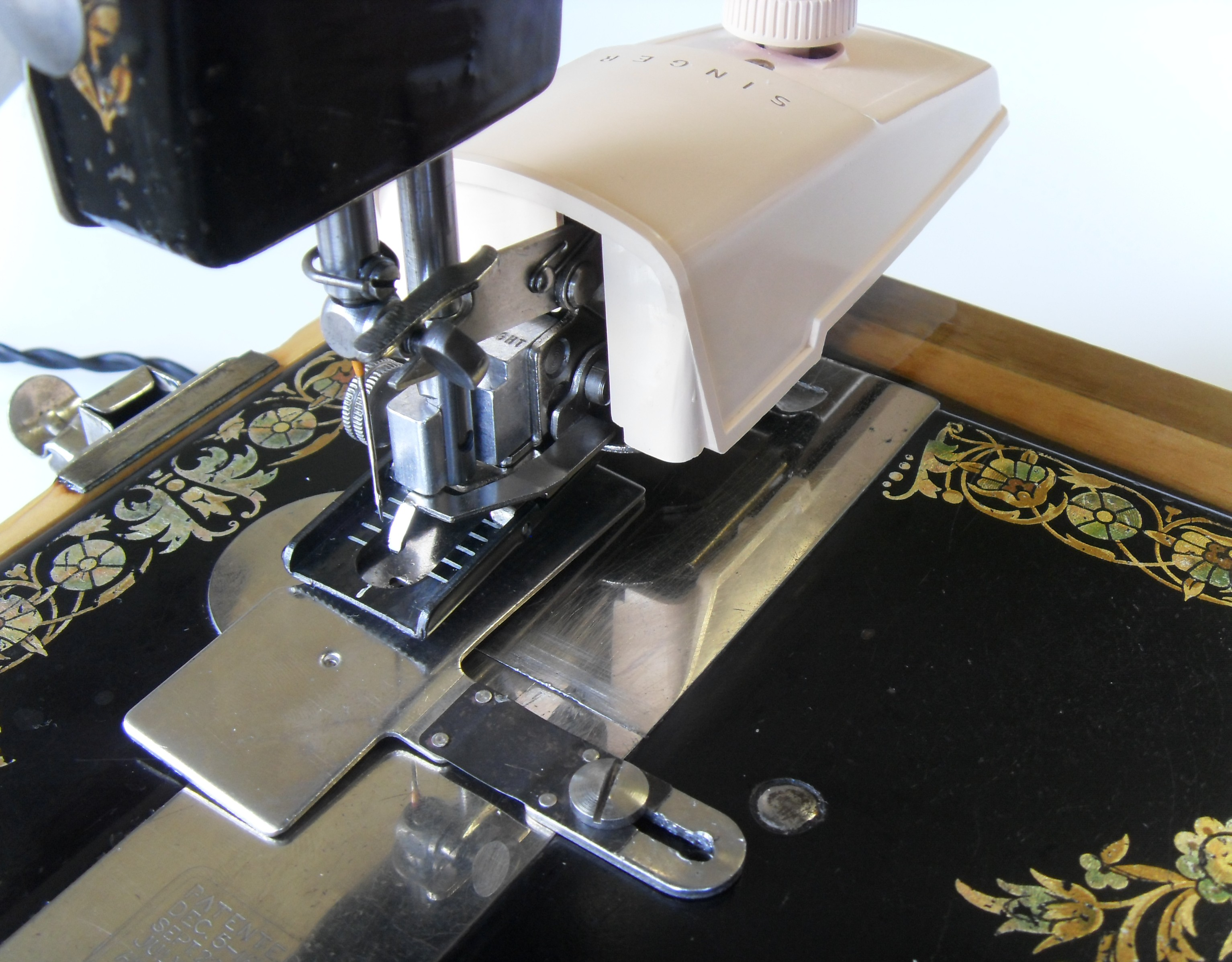
Singer (Greist) Template-Style Buttonholer Simanco № 489510 attached to a Singer Model № 27.

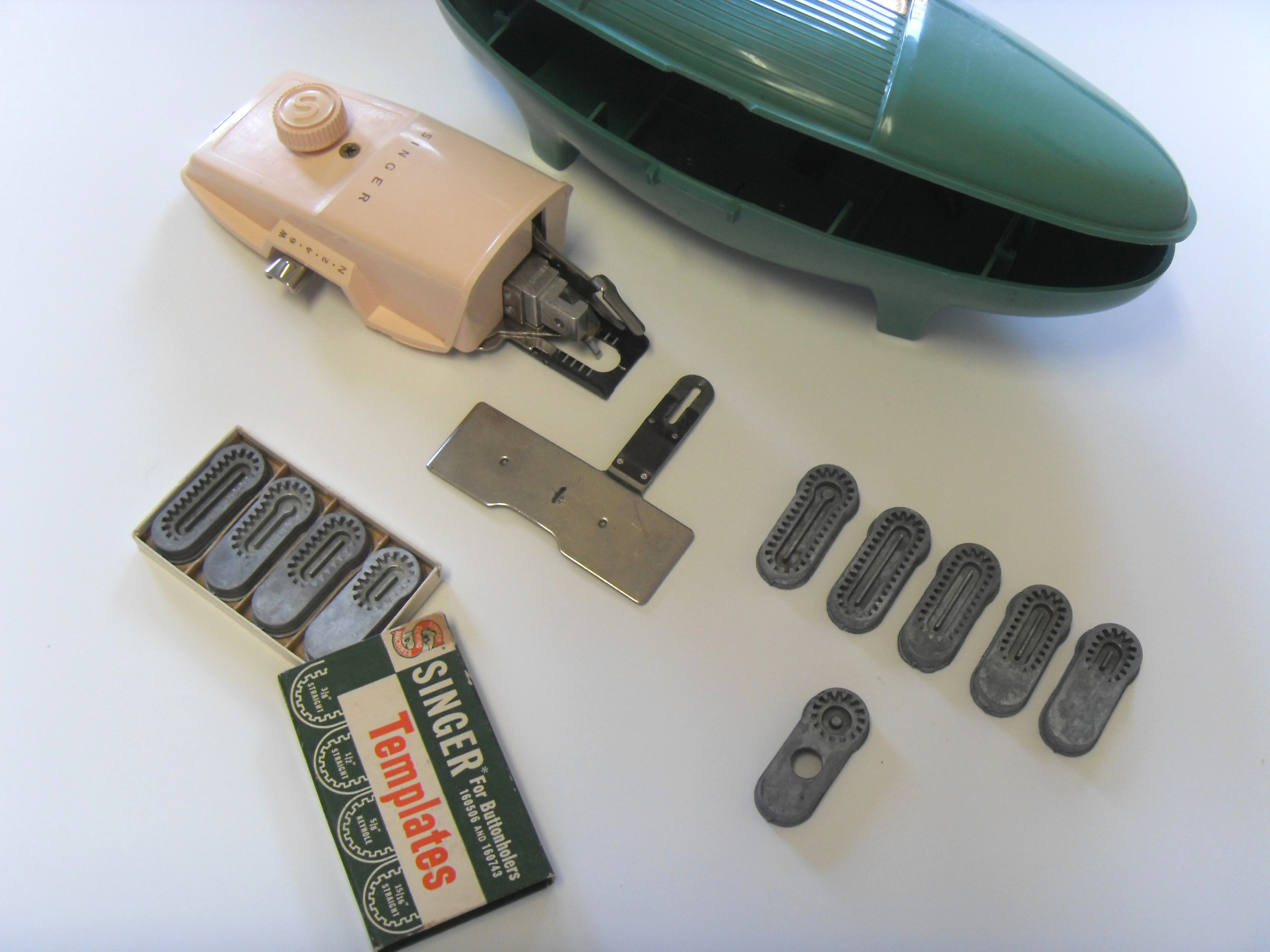
Simanco № 489510 Buttonholer & all 10 original metal Templates:– 7 Straight, 2 Keyhole & the Eyelet.

A buttonholer is an attachment for a sewing machine which automates the side-to-side and forwards-and-backwards motions involved in sewing a buttonhole.

Most modern sewing machines have this function built in, but many older machines do not, and straight stitch machines cannot sew a zigzag stitch with which buttonholes are constructed. A buttonholer attachment can create buttonholes from any sewing machine capable of making a lock stitch. (That is not to say, however, that some industrial buttonhole machines cannot employ a chain stitch, especially to create the purl when making keyhole buttonholes).

The buttonholer's adaptor attaches to the machine's presser bar, replacing the presser foot. In its place the buttonholer employs a cloth clamp with teeth on the underside to hold the material firmly whilst manipulating the cloth side to side and forwards and backwards. Driven by the up and down stitching motion of the needle bar via the fork arm straddling the needle clamp, it executes the series of movements to complete a buttonhole by moving the material rather than by moving the needle position. Buttonholers usually include a metal feed cover plate to cover the machine's feed dogs, so that they do not interfere with that of the buttonholer, though some machines allow the feed dogs to be disengaged or 'dropped'.

== Singer buttonholers ==
The Singer Manufacturing Company, (often abbreviated by Singer as Simanco), contracted several manufactures to produce buttonholers branded as Singer, in an evolving series of buttonholers that fit Singer machines. The Peerless Buttonholer for use on Singer VS machines was patented in 1887 and made by The Sackett Mf'g Co . The Lenox ' "Famous" Buttonhole Worker' was patented in 1916 (Simanco No. 36935).

Later buttonholer models made for Singer by 'Greist Mfg. Co.' employed templates to create a variety of different buttonhole sizes and shapes including keyhole buttonholes, as well as straight buttonholes, and even an eyelet. Produced for Singer from 1948 into the late 1980s, the Greist template design of buttonholers became Singer's longest running style of buttonholer.

Singer's line of buttonholers includes:–

For shank type	Simanco No.	Uses templates?	Description	Storage case
low	86662	no	black and chromed metal body, only made in the UK.	cardboard box
low	86718	no	ivory and red metal	red plastic box
low	86721	yes	'Auto-Pilot' for zig-zag machines	cardboard box
low	121795 kit 121908 buttonholer	no	old-style without a plastic body made exclusively in the USA similar mechanical design to 'Lenox' "Famous" Buttonhole Maker', but significantly lighter. Where Lenox' "Famous" used chromed cast metal, the 121795 / 121908 has a stamped sheet metal case.	cardboard box
low	160506	yes*	black metal body	green plastic case aka 'Treasure Chest' or the more rare black plastic case
low	489510**	yes*	beige plastic body	cardboard box (UK) or green Clamshell case aka 'Jetson' (US)
slant	102880	yes	'Professional', white plastic body	cardboard box
low	102878	yes	White plastic body. Box marked for vertical-needle zig-zag machines,(see below).	cardboard box
slant	160743	yes*	black metal body	maroon plastic case aka 'Treasure Chest'
slant	161829	yes	'Professional', white plastic body	cardboard box
slant	489500**	yes*	beige plastic body	cardboard box (UK) or pink Clamshell case aka 'Jetson' (US)

'Vertical Needle' when used by Singer to refer to domestic machines, became Singer's modern term for a 'low shank'.

The Simanco Nos. and sizes for the five templates included with the Singer (Greist design) buttonholer kit are as follows:–

Imperial Size	Metric Size	Buttonhole Type	Simanco No.	Composition
5/16 "	8 mm	Straight	160551	metal alloy, briefly made of grey Kralastic®, later made from a black fibre-resin composite
5/8 "	16 mm	Straight	160550	metal alloy, briefly made of grey Kralastic®, later made from a black fibre-resin composite
13/16 "	21 mm	Straight	160549	metal alloy, briefly made of grey Kralastic®, later made from a black fibre-resin composite
1 1/16 "	27 mm	Straight	160552	metal alloy, briefly made of grey Kralastic®, later made from a black fibre-resin composite
1 1/16 "	27 mm	Keyhole	160548	metal alloy, briefly made of grey Kralastic®, later made from a black fibre-resin composite

* Singer marketed additional templates in a Four-Pack, Simanco No. 160668, in the following sizes:– 3/8 " (10 mm) Straight, 1/2 " (13 mm) Straight, 15/16 " (24 mm) Straight, and a 5/8 " (16 mm) Keyhole. An Eyelet template (Simanco No. 161231) was available through Singer as well but sold separately. The four templates in the set 160668 could be purchased from Singer individually as well.

The individual Simanco Nos. for the additional four templates not supplied with the Greist design attachment, as well as the eyelet template are as follows:–

Imperial Size	Metric Size	Buttonhole Type	Simanco No.	Composition
3/8 "	10 mm	Straight	160561	metal alloy, briefly made of grey Kralastic®, later made from a black fibre-resin composite
1/2 "	13 mm	Straight	160562	metal alloy, briefly made of grey Kralastic®, later made from a black fibre-resin composite
15/16 "	24 mm	Straight	160563	metal alloy, briefly made of grey Kralastic®, later made from a black fibre-resin composite
5/8 "	16 mm	Keyhole	160564	metal alloy, briefly made of grey Kralastic®, later made from a black fibre-resin composite
1/8 " to 3/16 "	3 mm to 5 mm	Eyelet	161231	metal alloy, briefly made of grey Kralastic®, later made from a black fibre-resin composite

The width of the Eyelet varies depending on the setting chosen from narrow to wide. This is also the size of the eye of the Keyhole buttonholes, which likewise depends on the width chosen.

Greist often included a bonus in the form of a plastic pouch containing a set of the four additional templates — usually in grey Kralastic® — not normally included with the buttonholer, viz sizes:– 3/8 " (10 mm) Straight, 1/2 " (13 mm) Straight, 15/16 " (24 mm) Straight, and a 5/8 " (16 mm) Keyhole. However, Greist continued to sell the Eyelet — made of metal alloy — individually, as well as selling templates in a Five-Pack of metal alloy inclusive of the eyelet; and in later years sold an Eight-Pack of templates — that included an Eyelet template — but only ever made of a black plastic fibre composite, or included them with the purchase of a Greist Buttonholer.

The three new additional sizes offered were:– 1 " (25 mm) straight, 7/8 " (22 mm) straight, and 7/8 " (22 mm) keyhole.

** The Simanco numbers of the Clamshell (Jetson) buttonholers 489500 (Slant) and 489510 (Straight) are very often confused. This is because these numbers are not stamped on the attachments or on their Clamshell (Jetson) Cases, and the 'one size fits all' user manual simply says 'For 489500 or 489510'. The only differences between the two models are:– 1.) The shank Adaptor is stamped 'STRAIGHT' on the low-shank model but 'SLANT' on the slant-shank model, and 2.) The Clamshell (Jetson) Case is green for the low-shank model but pink for the slant-shank model. (In later years, after singer had given up the Clamshell (Jetson) Case, these two model numbers were sold in red & white cardboard boxes, marked at one end 'Part No. 489500 SLANT', or 'For VERTICAL Needle Sewing Machines Part No. 489510'). (See note above on Singer's later use of the word 'Vertical').

== White buttonholers ==
Greist Mfg Co. produced a buttonholer adapted to fit White Sewing Machine Company models, and which is internally identical to ones it produced as the Singer 160506 and 160743, or later 489500 and 489510 template-driven buttonholers. Under contract to White, the attachment was branded the 'White Magic Key Buttonhole Worker'.

== YS Star buttonholers ==
YS Star is a Japanese brand of sewing accessories made by the Yoshikoshi Manufacturing Company since 1945. The YS-4454 and YS-4455 look very similar to the Famous Buttonhole Worker 121704 and 36935, which were patented in 1916 . Three different models are offered, two of which have been cloned by Chinese manufacturers. The Japanese Yoshikoshi buttonholer shows "YS STAR", the star trademark, and "Made in Japan" in various locations.

For shank type	YS Star part number	Clone part number	Body	Description
low	YS-7004	?	grey plastic over chromed metal	intended for home use
low and high	YS-4454	FBA-20	chromed metal	intended for home or industrial use*
high	YS-4455	IBA-10	chromed metal	intended for industrial use*

On all models, adjustment wheels or winged screws set the buttonhole length, 'bight' (zigzag stitch width), and stitch length.

* The 'YS-445x" model settings are controlled by slotted screws because the settings are not expected to be changed often.
