= John de Havilland =

John de Havilland may refer to:

- John de Havilland (officer of arms) (1826–1886), officer of arms at the College of Arms in London
- John de Havilland (pilot) (1918–1943), British test pilot
