= John Haviland =

English-born American architect (1792–1852)

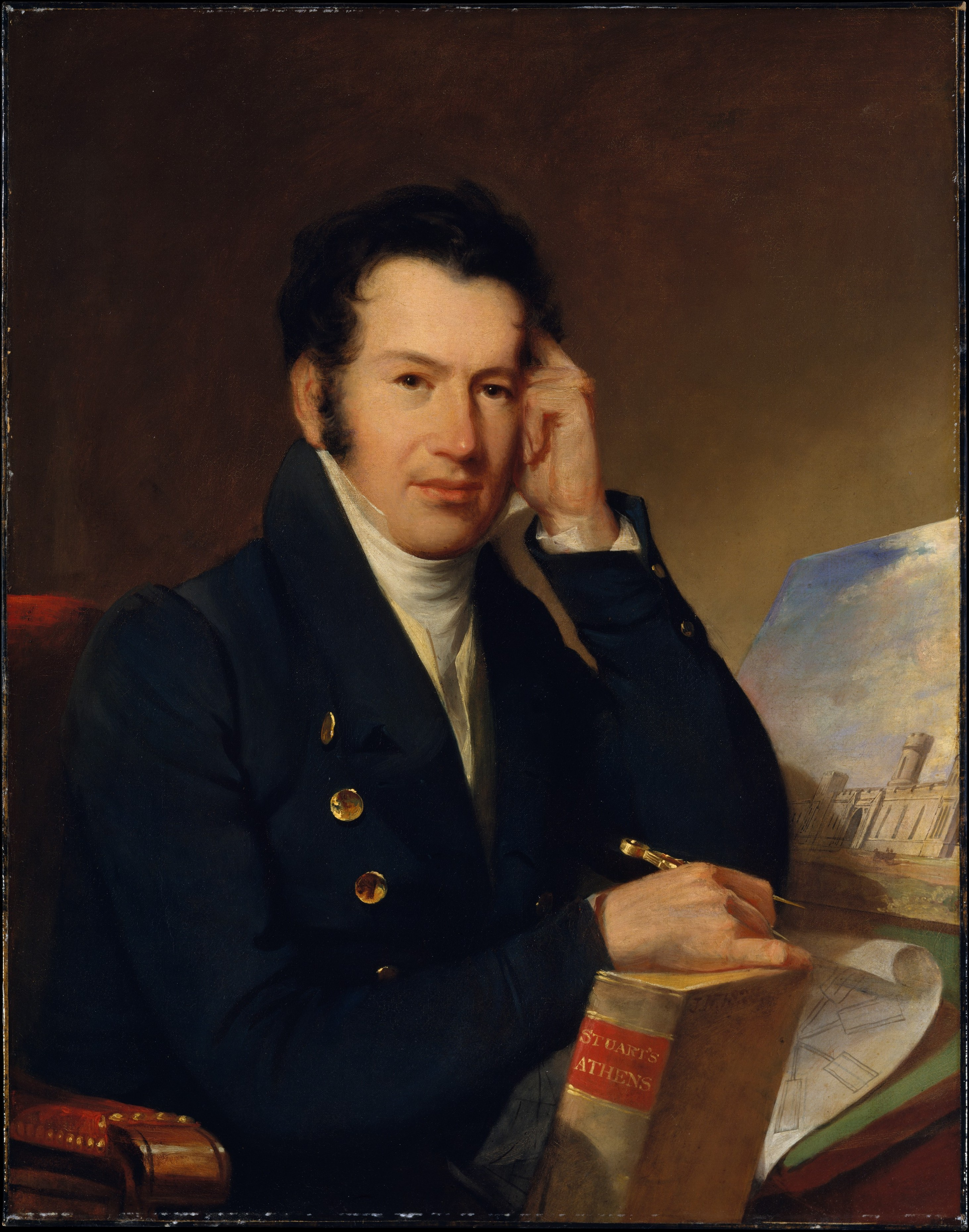
- Portrait of Haviland by John Neagle, 1828
- Born: 15 December 1792; Gundenham, Somerset, England
- Died: 28 March 1852 (aged 59); Philadelphia, Pennsylvania, U.S.
- Spouse: Mary Wright von Sonntag (after 1819)
- Children: John de Havilland, Edward Haviland

John Haviland (December 15, 1792 – March 28, 1852) was an English-born American architect, best remembered for his innovative designs of prisons. He was a major figure in American Neo-Classical architecture, and one of the most notable nineteenth-century architects working from Philadelphia.

== Biography ==
Born December 15, 1792, at Gundenham, near Wellington, England, Haviland was apprenticed in 1811 to a London architect. In 1815, he unsuccessfully pursued an appointment to the Russian Imperial Corps of Engineers. In Russia, however, he met George von Sonntag and John Quincy Adams, who encouraged him to work in the United States. He arrived in Philadelphia in 1816, and soon established himself as one of the few professional architects in the city.

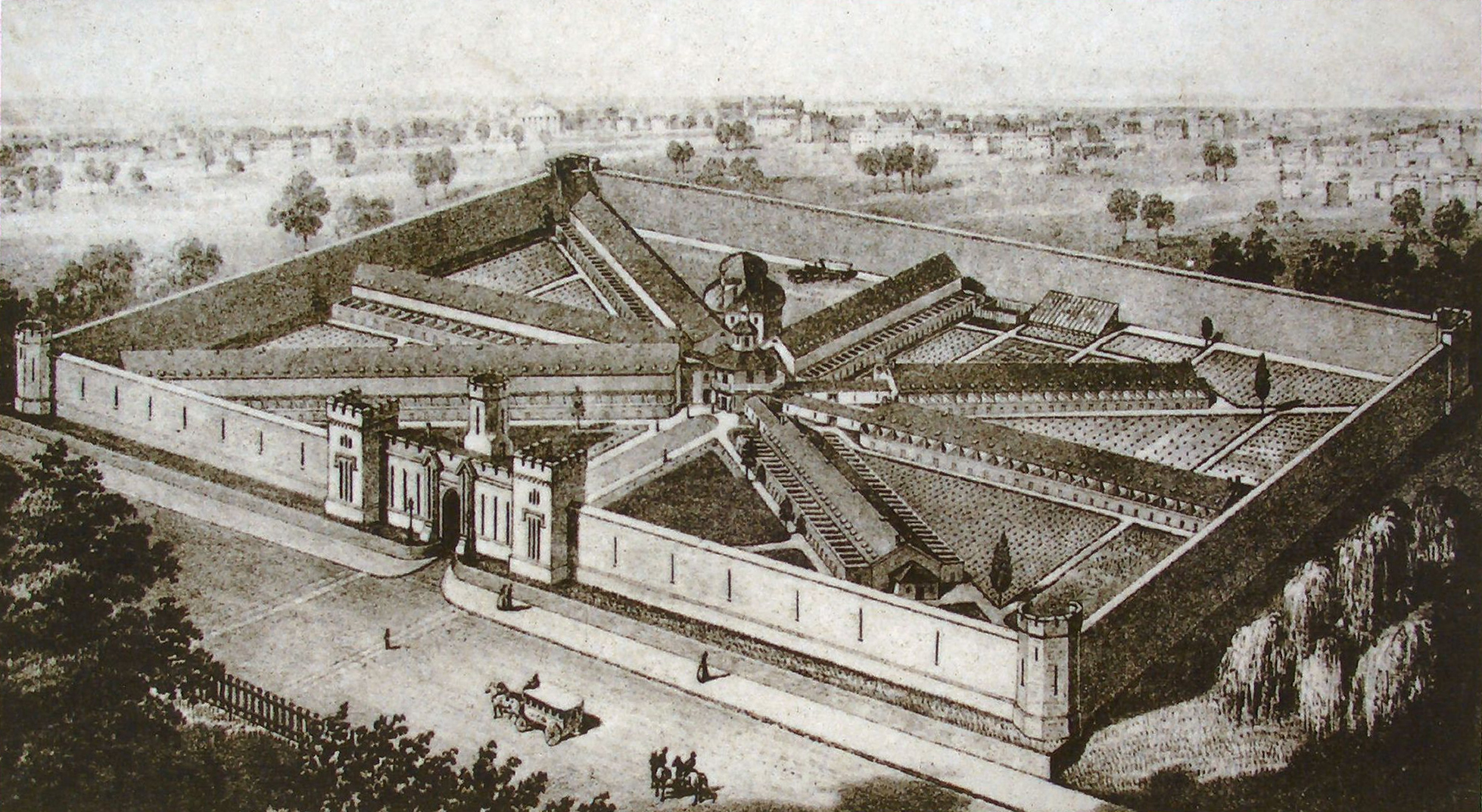
Eastern State Penitentiary, Philadelphia, PA (1821).

By 1818, Haviland produced a book, The Builder's Assistant, which appeared in three volumes over several years. This publication was one of the earliest architectural pattern books written and published in North America, and likely the first to include Greek and Roman classical orders.

Due, in part, to The Builder's Assistant, Haviland began to secure what would be his most important commissions in Philadelphia: the Eastern State Penitentiary, the Pennsylvania Institution for the Deaf and Dumb (formerly Dorrance Hamilton Hall, University of the Arts), and the original Franklin Institute building (formerly home to the Atwater Kent Museum).

During this time, Haviland unwisely speculated financially on his own projects, including commercial arcades in Philadelphia and New York, as well as an amusement park. He was eventually forced into bankruptcy, tarnishing his professional reputation in Philadelphia. Elsewhere, however, Haviland's reputation as a designer of prisons brought him important commissions, including the New Jersey Penitentiary, The Tombs in New York City, and prisons in Missouri, Rhode Island, and Arkansas.

Haviland was an Honorary and Corresponding Member of the Royal Institute of British Architects. In 1827, he was elected into the National Academy of Design as an Honorary Academician.

== Personal life ==
On July 2, 1819, Haviland was married to Mary Wright von Sonntag by the Right Rev. William White, Bishop of Pennsylvania. She was the sister of George von Sonntag and the daughter of Captain William Ludwig von Sonntag of the French Army.

John & Mary Haviland had two sons: John von Sonntag de Havilland (1826–1886), who became an English Army officer and taught at the College of Arms in London; and Edward Haviland (1823-1872), who became an architect, like his father, and designed prisons in the United States.

== Death and interment ==
Haviland died in Philadelphia on March 28, 1852, and was buried in the family vault at St. Andrew's Episcopal Church in Philadelphia (now the Greek Orthodox Cathedral of St. George). Haviland had designed the vault himself.

== Architectural work, partial listing ==
=== Philadelphia buildings ===
- Additions & alterations to Old City Hall, 5th & Chestnut Sts., Philadelphia (1820).
- First Presbyterian Church (Washington Square Presbyterian), SE corner 7th & Locust Sts., Philadelphia (1820–22, demolished 1939).
- St. Andrew's Episcopal Church, 256 S. 8th St., Philadelphia (1822–23). Now Greek Orthodox Cathedral of St. George.
- Pennsylvania Institution for the Deaf and Dumb, NW corner Broad & Pine Sts., Philadelphia (1824–26). Formerly, Dorrance Hamilton Hall, University of the Arts.
- Franklin Institute, 15 S. 7th St., Philadelphia (1825). Former home of the Atwater Kent Museum.
- Philadelphia Arcade, 615-19 Chestnut St., Philadelphia (1826–27, demolished 1860). The first American enclosed shopping gallery.
- Walnut Street Theater, 9th & Walnut Sts., Philadelphia (1827–28). Oldest continuously operated theater in the U.S.
- Eastern State Penitentiary, Fairmount Avenue between Corinthian Avenue and North 22nd St., Philadelphia (1829).
- Boston Row, NW corner 12th & Chestnut Sts., Philadelphia (1830).
- Independence Hall, 5th & 6th streets, renovation of second story (1831) and restoration of assembly room (1833)
- Egyptian Revival style Pennsylvania Fire Insurance building, 1838, Philadelphia
- Kensington Commissioner's Hall, Frankford Avenue & Master Street (1833–34), still standing in 1878, demolished by c1890.[7]

=== Buildings elsewhere ===
- Monument to prison reformer John Howard in Kherson, Ukraine
- U.S. Naval Asylum, Portsmouth, VA (1827).
- Miner's Bank, Pottsville, PA (1830–31, demolished).
- New Jersey State Penitentiary, near Trenton (1832–6).
- Rebuilding of Pittsburgh Penitentiary (Western Penitentiary) (1833–36).
- The Tombs (Hall of Justice), New York, NY (1835–38, demolished 1902).
- Missouri State Penitentiary, Jefferson City, MO (1836). Closed in 2004.
- Essex County Jail, New Street, Newark, NJ (1836–38). Abandoned since 1971.
- Newark County Hall, Newark, NJ
- Berks County Jail, Reading, PA (1848).
- Harrisburg State Hospital AKA Pennsylvania State Lunatic Hospital, Harrisburg, PA (1848–51).
- Lancaster County Jail, 625 E. King Street, Lancaster, PA (1851).
- Rhode Island State Penitentiary
- (Old) Allegheny County Jail, Pittsburgh, PA.
- York County Hall, York, PA.
- Luzerne County Jail, Wilkes-Barre, Pennsylvania (circa 1850).
- Fuller's Hotel, Washington, D.C.
- Brown's Hotel (Washington, D.C.)

== Gallery ==
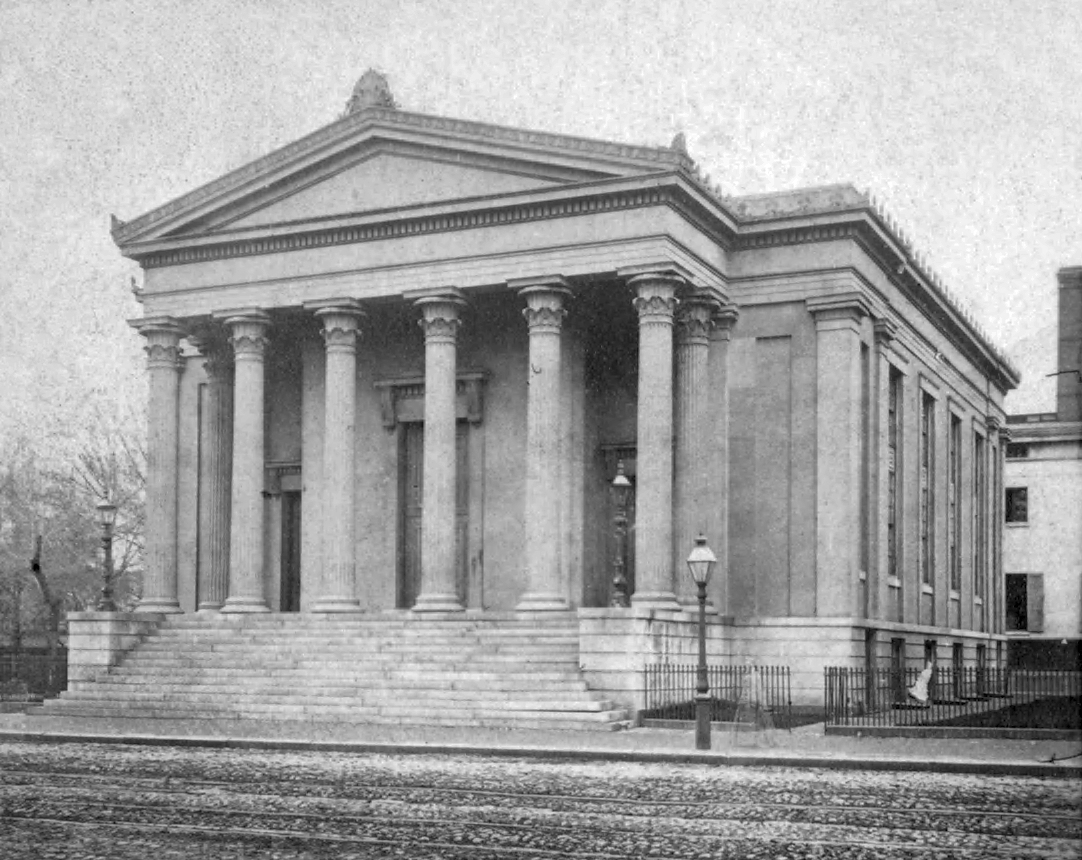
Washington Square Presbyterian Church in Philadelphia, built 1820–22 (demolished 1939)

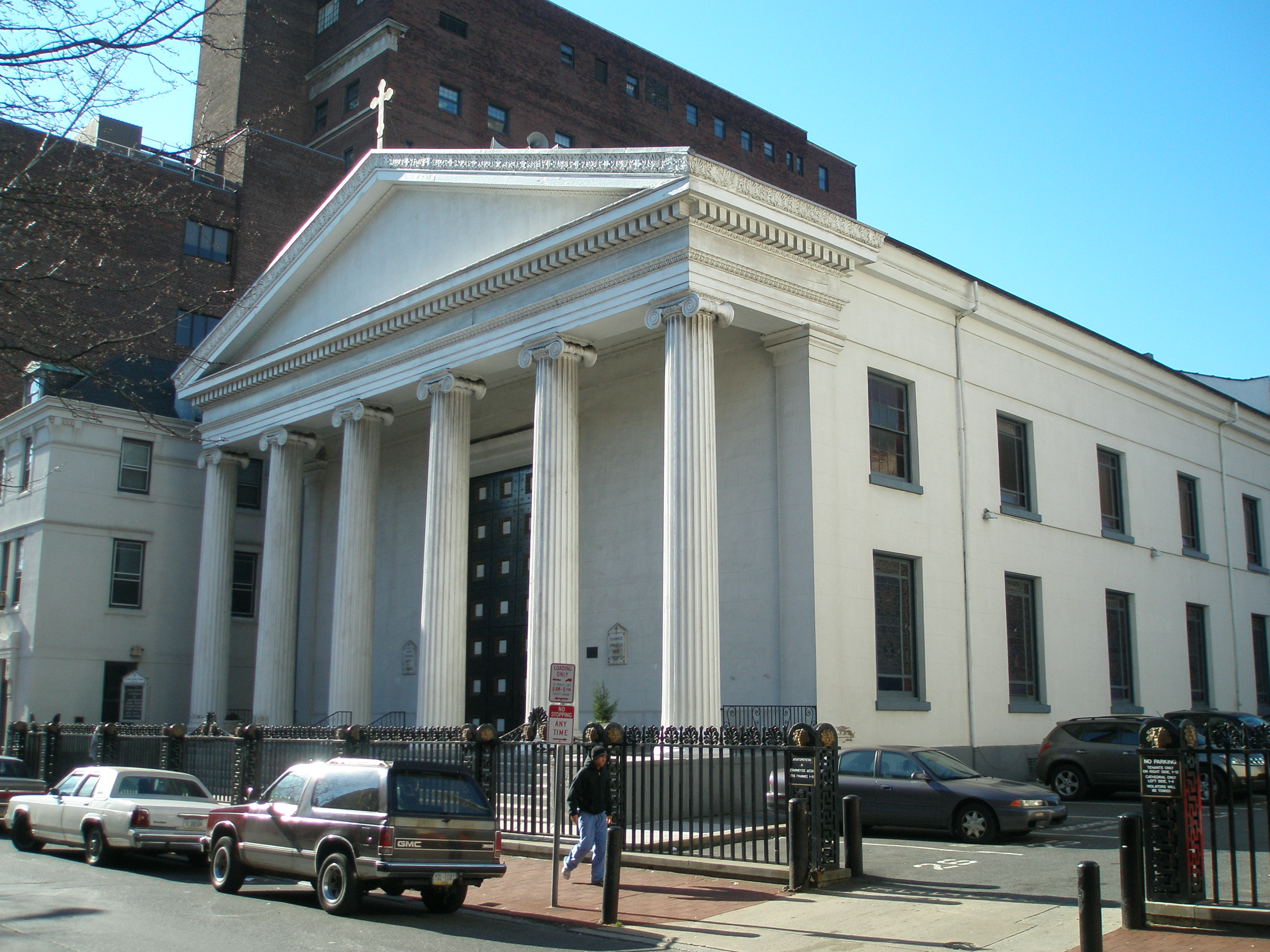
St. Andrew's Episcopal Church in Philadelphia, built 1822–23 (now Greek Orthodox Cathedral of St. George)

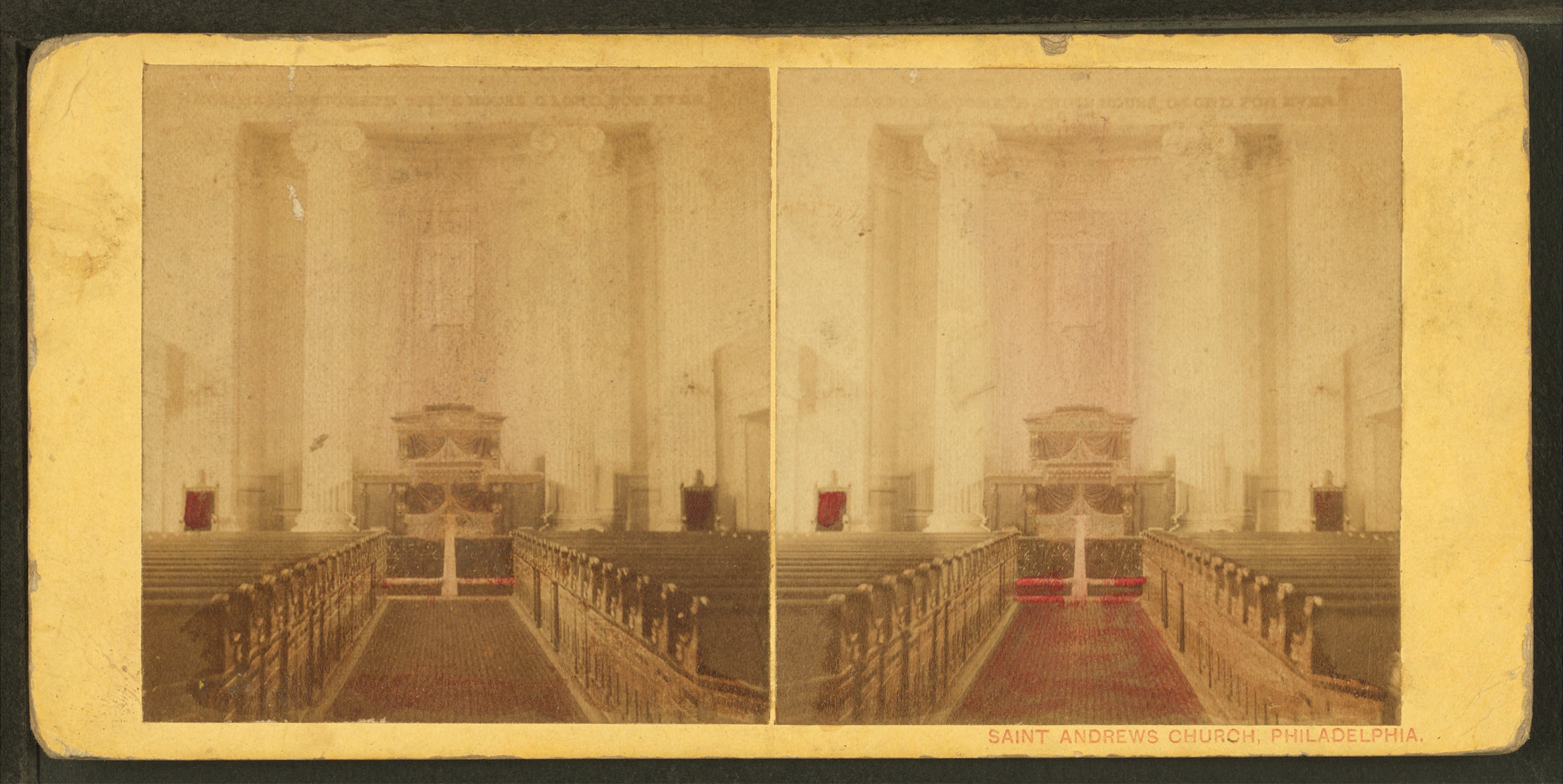
Interior of St. Andrews Church in Philadelphia

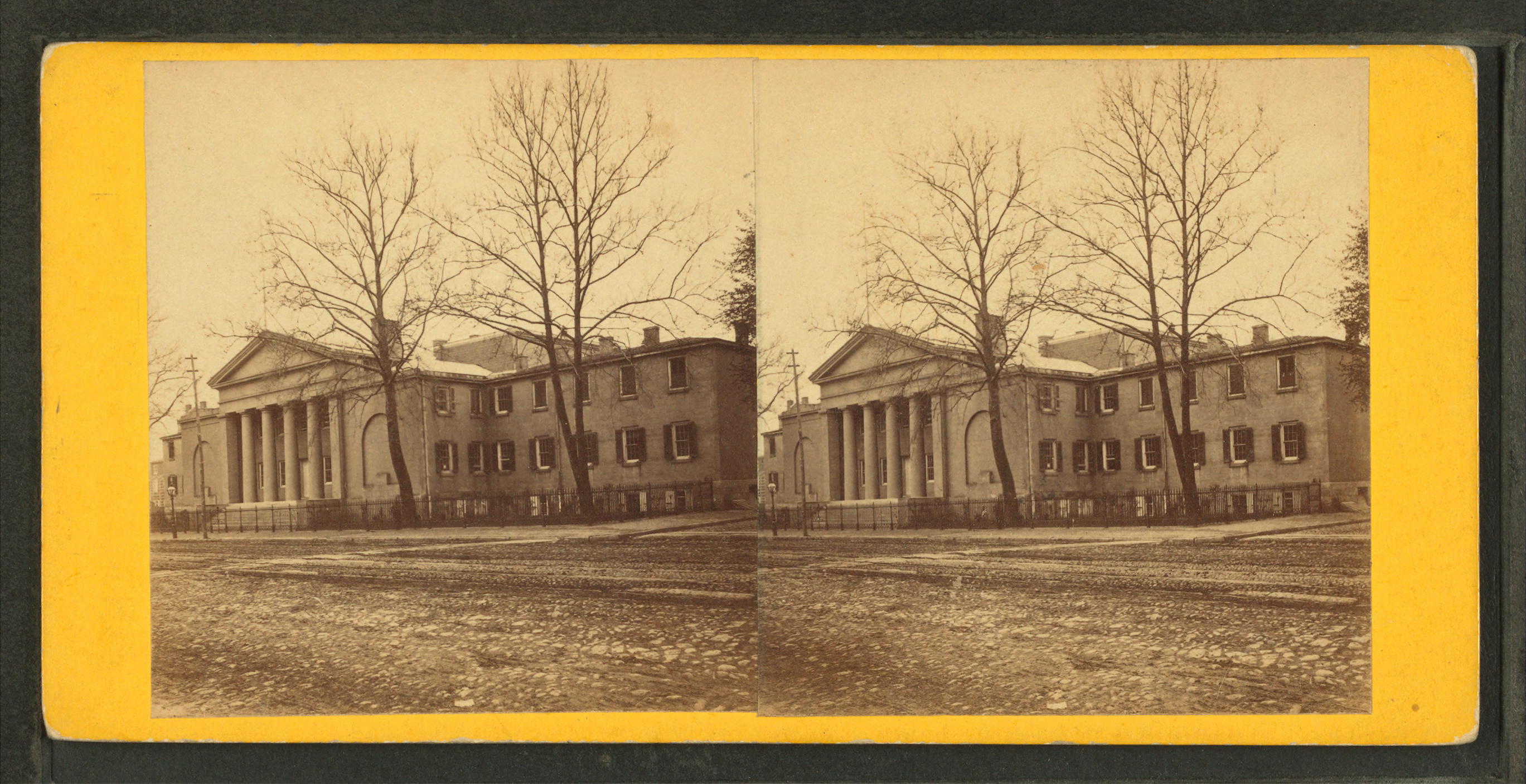
Pennsylvania Asylum for the Deaf and Dumb, Philadelphia, built 1824–26 (now Dorance Hamilton Hall at the University of the Arts)

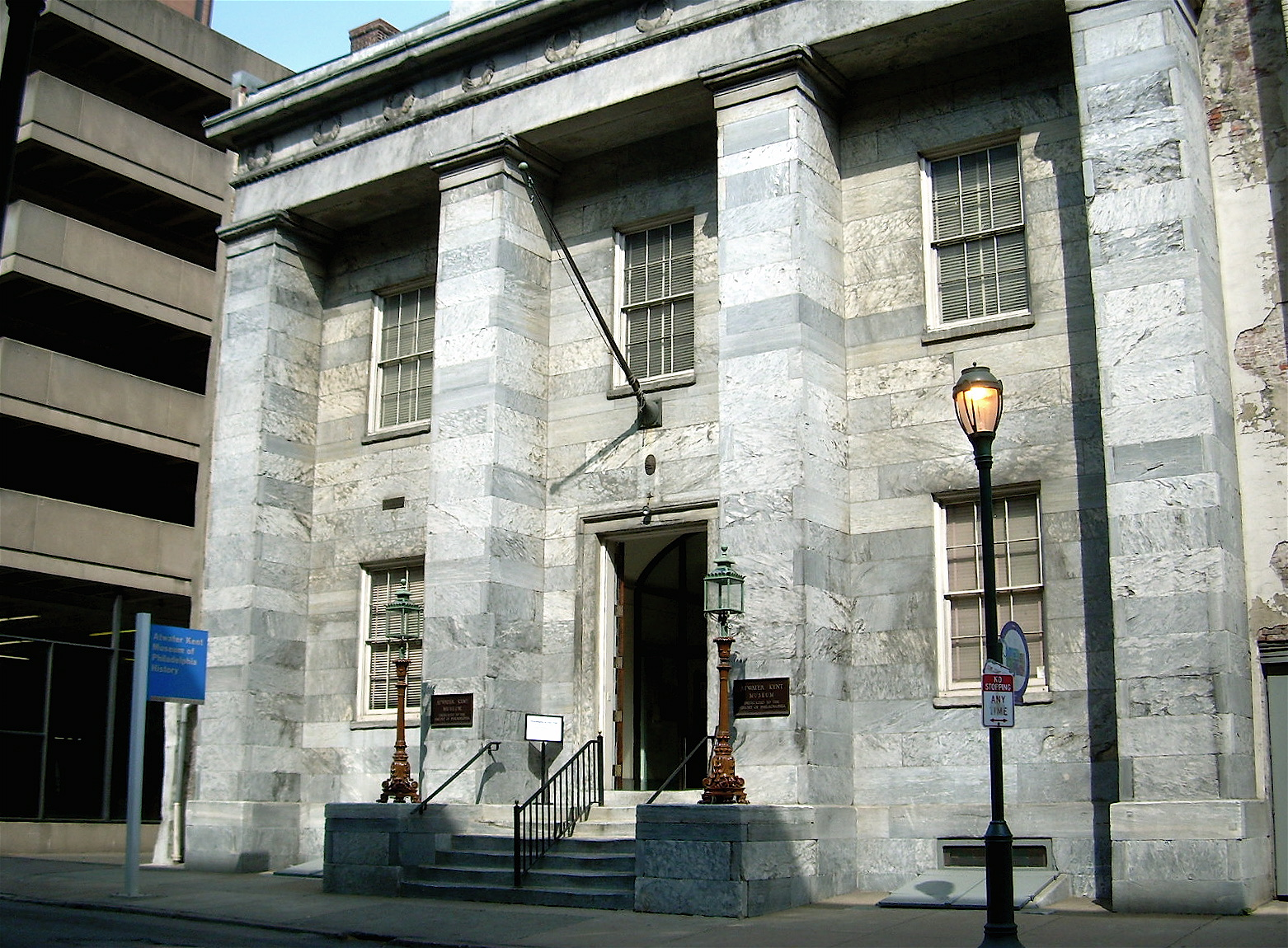
Franklin Institute (first building), Philadelphia, built 1825 (former home of the Atwater Kent Museum)

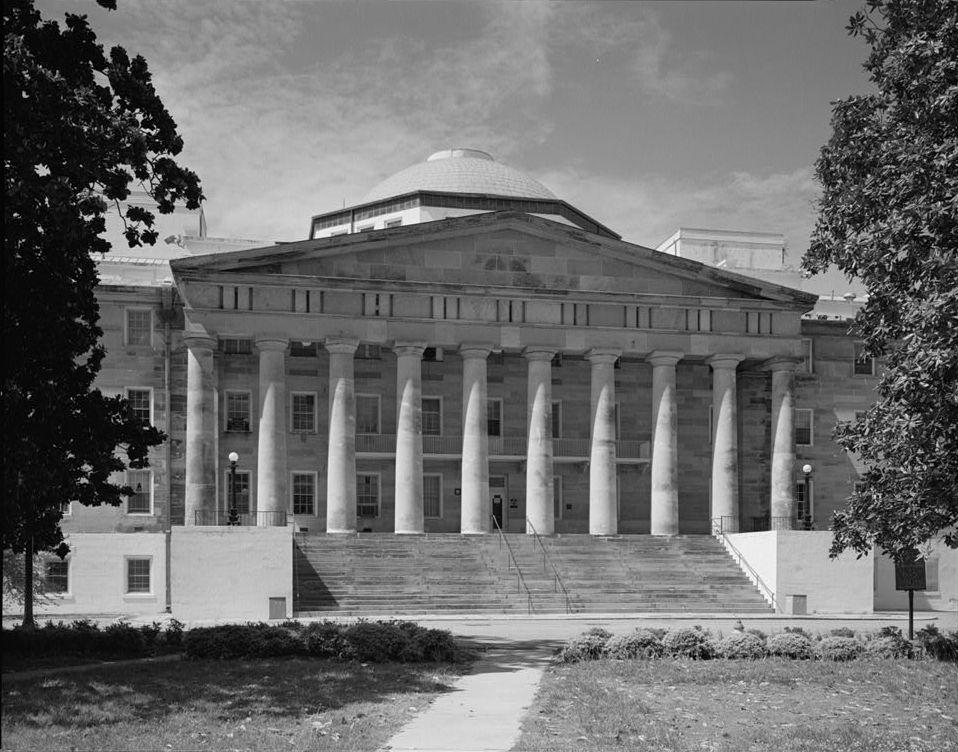
U.S. Naval Asylum in Portsmouth, built 1827.

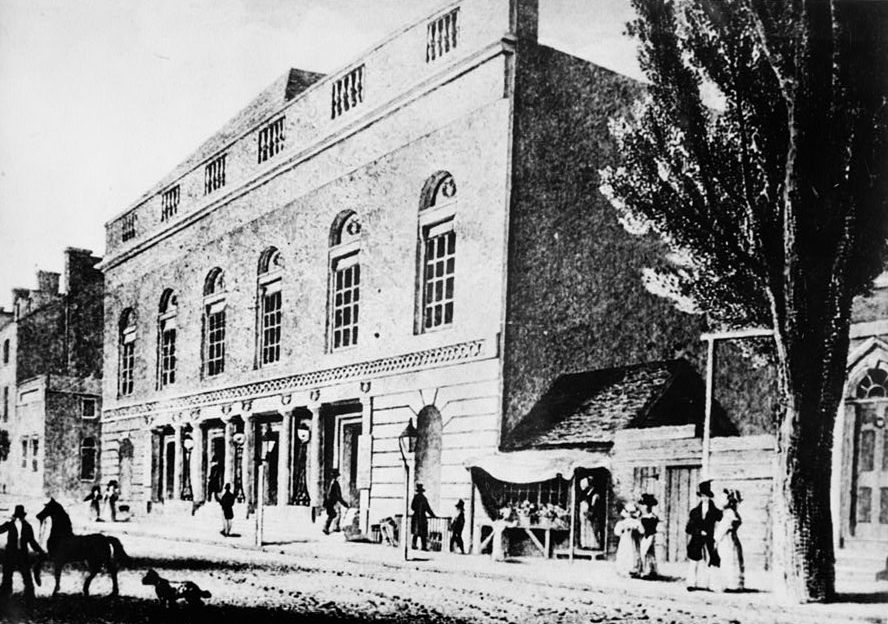
Walnut Street Theater in Philadelphia, built 1827–28, (oldest continually operated theater in the United States)

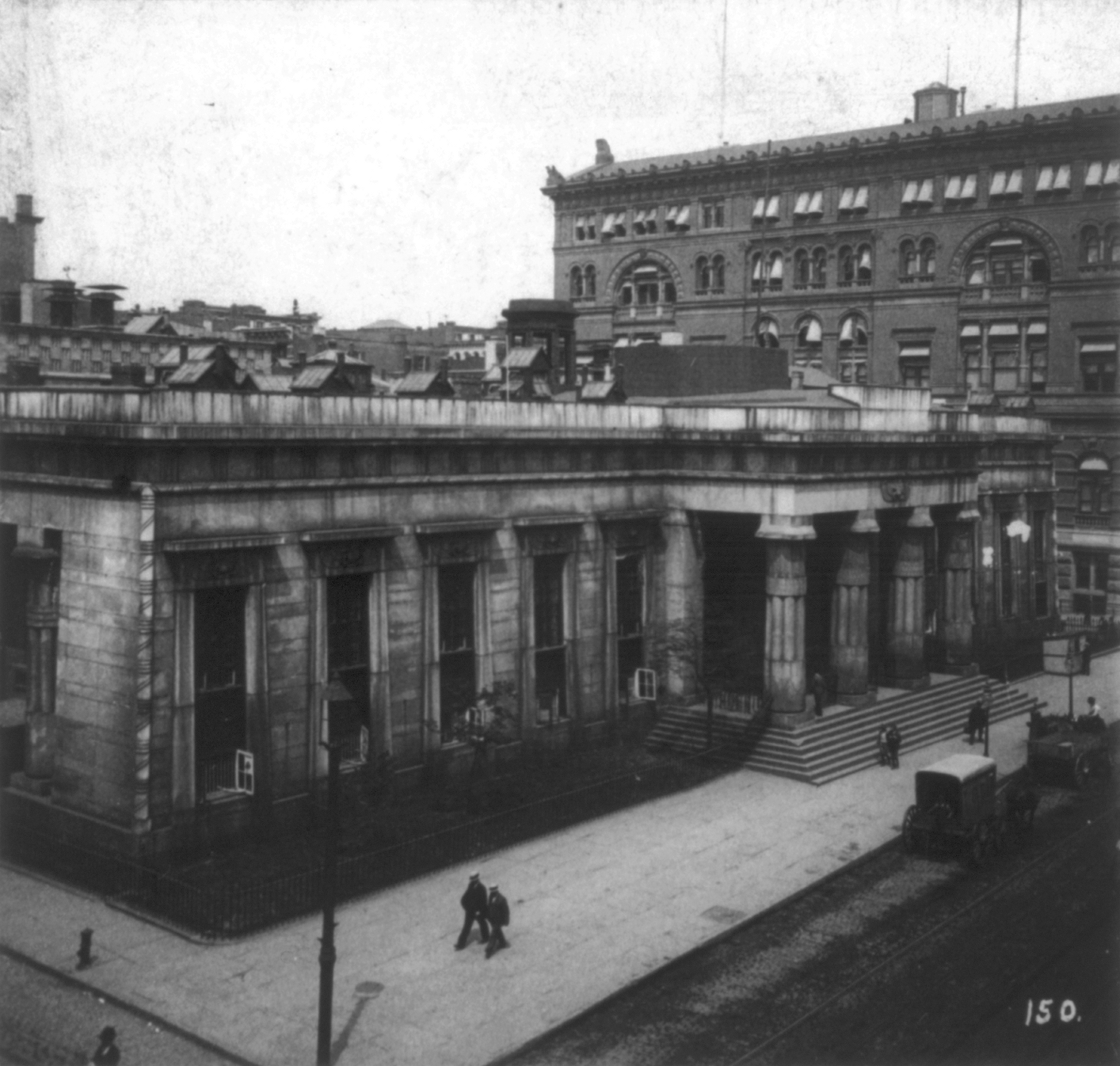
The Tombs in New York, built 1835–38 (demolished 1902).

Eastern State Penitentiary in Philadelphia, opened in 1829

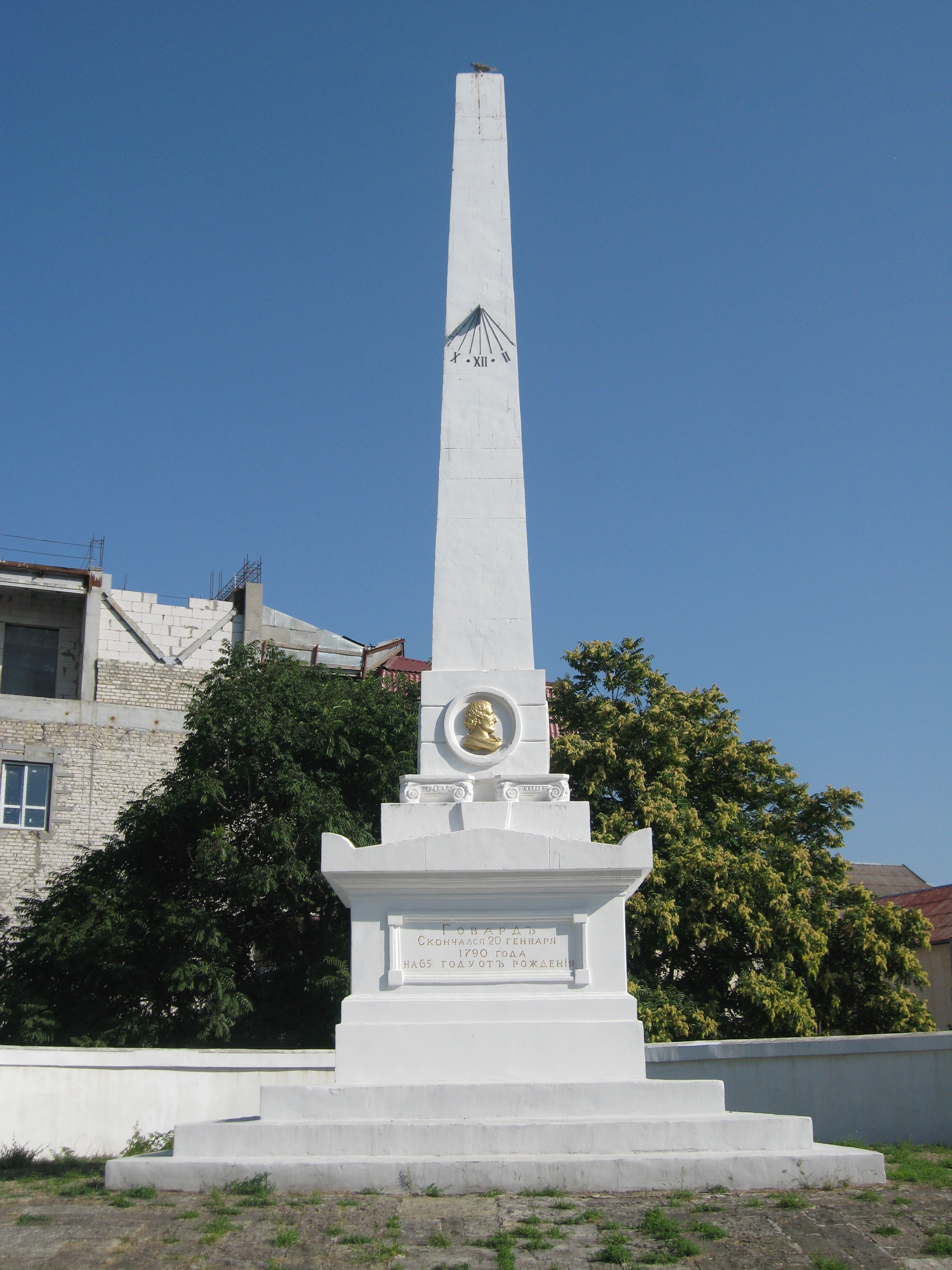
Monument to John Howard, 1815 in Russian Crimea
