= St. George Cathedral (Philadelphia) =

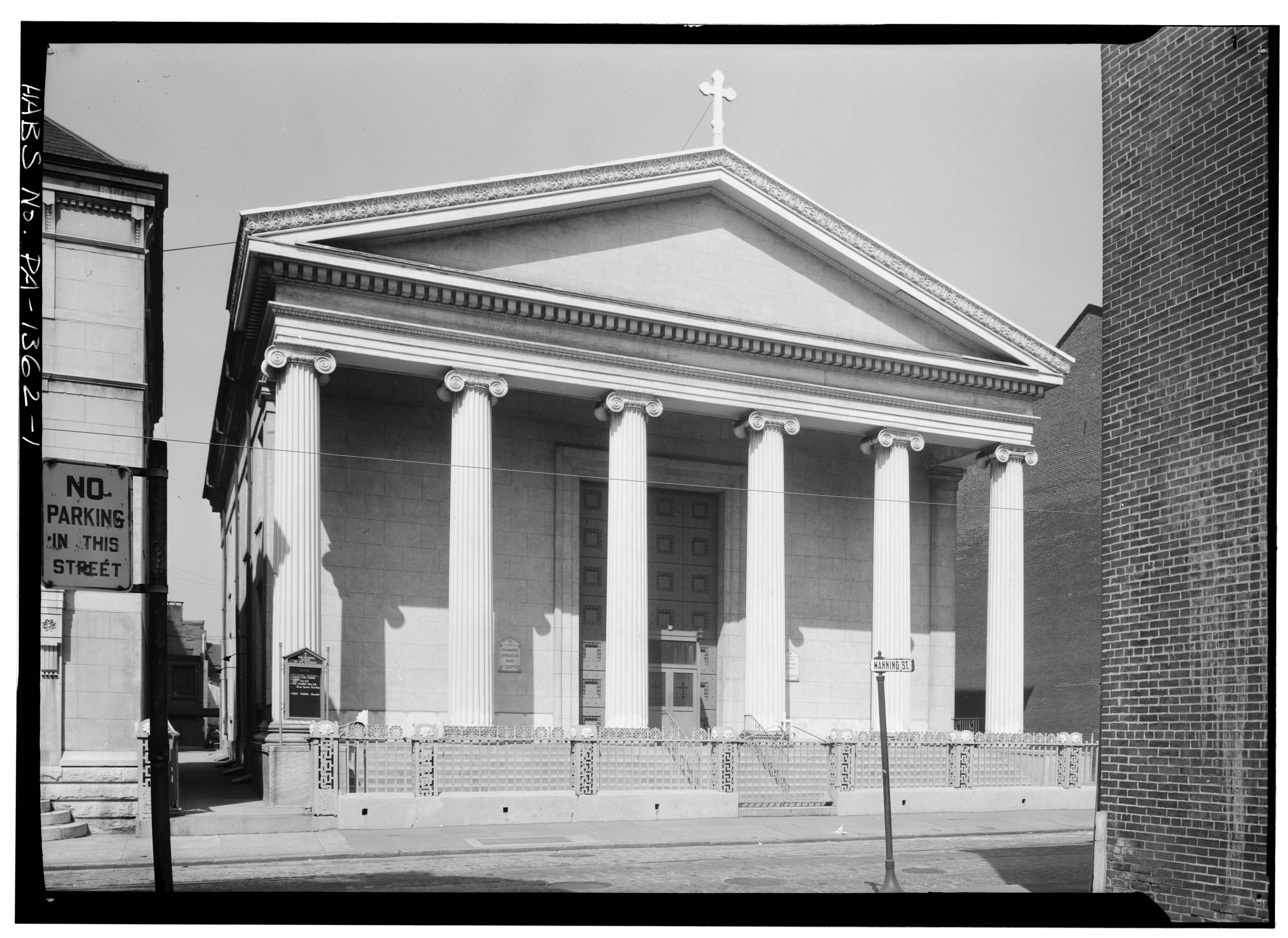
- St. George Cathedral
- 39.94633°N 75.15494°W
- Country: United States
- Denomination: Eastern Orthodox
- Website: saintgeorgecathedral.org

Architecture
- Architect: John Haviland

Administration
- Archdiocese: Greek Orthodox Archdiocese of America
- Diocese: Greek Orthodox Metropolis of New Jersey

St. George Cathedral is a Greek Orthodox cathedral in Philadelphia, Pennsylvania. Built in 1822, the church was designed by architect John Haviland in a Greek Revival style. It was originally an Episcopal Church named Saint Andrew's Episcopal Church but in 1921 was reconsecrated as a Greek Orthodox Church.

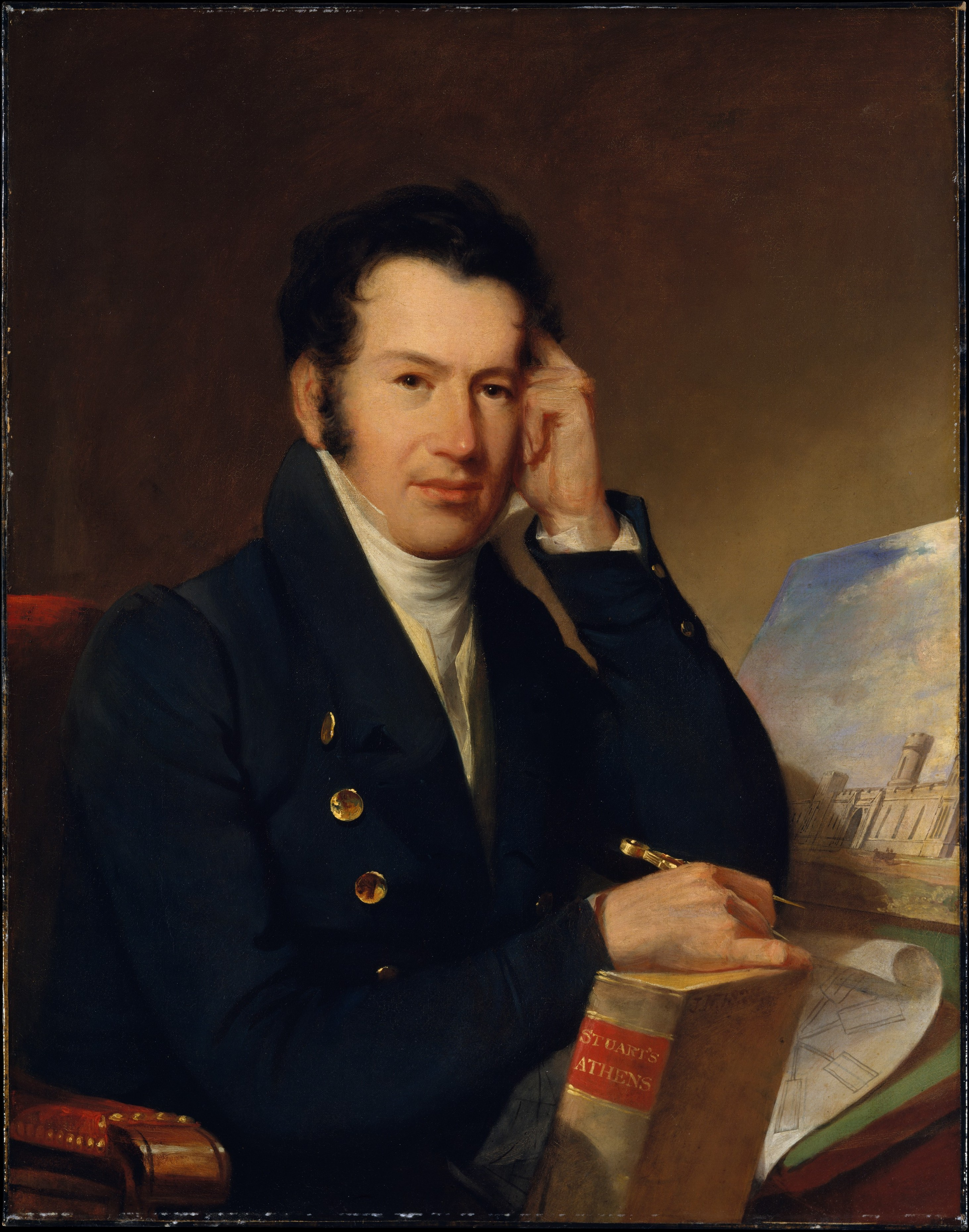
John Haviland holding a copy of The Antiquities of Athens

== History ==
The Greek Revival style of architecture was at a height of popularity in North America in the 1820s. The architect John Haviland got his first major commission in 1820, for the First Presbyterian Church on Washington Square; his design was inspired by the Temple of Artemis Agrotera at Ilissus in Athens. Two years later, he was commissioned for another church only a block away on 8th Street between Spruce and Locust. His design for the new Saint Andrew's Episcopal Church was based on the temple of Dionysus at Teos.

As an Episcopal church, Saint Andrew's was a strong supporter of the Greek struggle for independence from the Ottoman Empire, and the rector of the church in 1827 delivered a sermon entitled "The Cause of the Greeks" to stir up support for a committee that sent supplies to the revolutionaries.

A wave of Greek immigrants arrived in the United States between the 1890s and the 1920s, and a Greek community established itself in Philadelphia. In 1908 the Greek community purchased All Saints Episcopal Church at 745 S 12th St, which was renamed Evangelismos, becoming the first Greek Orthodox church in Philadelphia. This was followed in 1921 by the purchase of Saint Andrew's Episcopal Church, which was renamed St. George, beginning the history of the building as a Greek Orthodox church. Despite the tight quotas set on Greek immigrants following the Immigration Act of 1924, the community maintained itself and in the 1930s St. George was designated as the regions cathedral.

St. George Cathedral hosted the seventh Clergy-Laity Congress in 1942, especially notable because it brought together the exiled King George II of Greece, the prime minister of the Greek government-in-exile Emmanouil Tsouderos, and the Greek Orthodox Archbishop of North and South America Athenagoras I of Constantinople.
