= Philadelphia History Museum =

- U.S. National Register of Historic Places
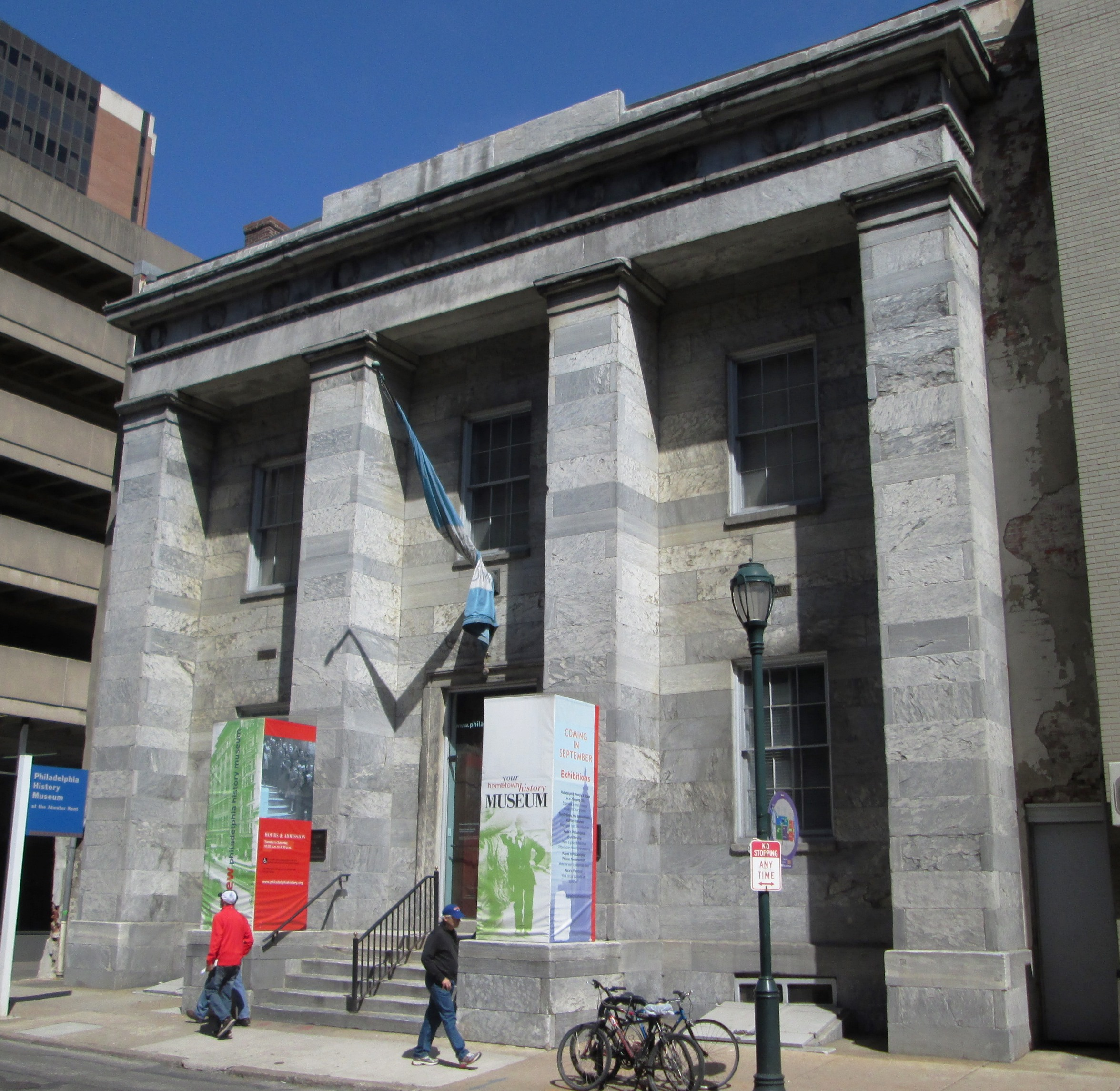
- (2013)

- Location within Philadelphia Location within Pennsylvania Location within the United States
- Location: 15 S. 7th Street; Philadelphia, Pennsylvania
- Coordinates: 39°57′1″N 75°9′9″W
- Built: 1825
- Architect: John Haviland
- Architectural style: Greek Revival
- NRHP reference No.: 79002319
- Added to NRHP: August 1, 1979

The Philadelphia History Museum was a public history museum located in Center City, Philadelphia from 1938 until 2018. From 1938 until 2010, the museum was known as the Atwater Kent Museum. The museum occupied architect John Haviland's landmark Greek Revival structure built in 1824–1826 for the Franklin Institute. The Museum operated as a city agency as part of Philadelphia's Department of Recreation. The building was listed on the National Register of Historic Places on August 1, 1979.

== History ==
The museum was established through the efforts of Philadelphia Mayor S. Davis Wilson, Frances Wistar, president of the Philadelphia Society for the Preservation of Landmarks, and A. Atwater Kent, radio pioneer and inventor. In 1938 Kent purchased the former Franklin Institute building, which the Institute had vacated in 1933, and gifted the building to the city for use as a public history museum. Following renovations carried out by the Works Progress Administration, the Museum opened in 1941.

After years of declining attendance and financial shortfalls, the museum closed its doors in 2018. In September 2019, the city approved a plan to transfer the museum's collections to Drexel University who would preserve the collections and offer them out for loan. Drexel was granted control of the collection in April 2022. Drexel University has reverted the name of the collection to refer to Atwater Kent as the Atwater Kent Collection at Drexel.

Since closing, the city-owned building has been boarded up and neglected, with the rear garden accumulating trash and the building violating code.

== Collection ==
The Museum's collections included more than 80,000 objects related to Philadelphia and regional history, including an estimated 10,000 17th- to 20th-century artifacts transferred from the Historical Society of Pennsylvania art and artifact collection in 2009, 1700 Quaker-related items from Friends Historical Association Collection, and collections reflecting Philadelphia manufacturing, the 1876 Centennial Exposition, toys and miniatures, and radio broadcasting.

Highlights from the permanent exhibitions included the boxing gloves of Joe Frazier, the desk of George Washington, a drinking glass owned by Benjamin Franklin, and a wampum belt allegedly given to William Penn by the Lenape.
