= John de Havilland (officer of arms) =

British officer of arms (1826–1886)

John von Sonntag de Havilland FSA (17 October 1826 – 18 September 1886) was an officer of arms at the College of Arms in London during the 19th century. He is notable for being one of only two English officers of arms to have been born in the United States of America (Blanche Lyon Pursuivant Extraordinary Alexander Ochterlony, appointed in 1784, was the other).

== Personal life ==
John de Havilland was born on 17 October 1826, probably near Philadelphia, Pennsylvania. His father, John Haviland, was born in Somerset, England, and practiced as an architect and an engineer; in Russia, John Haviland met John Quincy Adams, who encouraged him to come to the United States, which he did in 1816. John de Havilland's mother, Mary (née Wright), was the daughter of Captain W. L. von Sonntag of the French army and the sister and heiress of General Sir George von Sonntag, Governor of South Russia.

John de Havilland served as an adjutant lieutenant in the 3rd Regiment of United States Dragoons in the army of General William J. Worth during the Mexican War (1846-1848). He later became a barrister at the Inner Temple in London as well as a Professed Knight of Justice of the Order of Malta. See images (1-3) below...

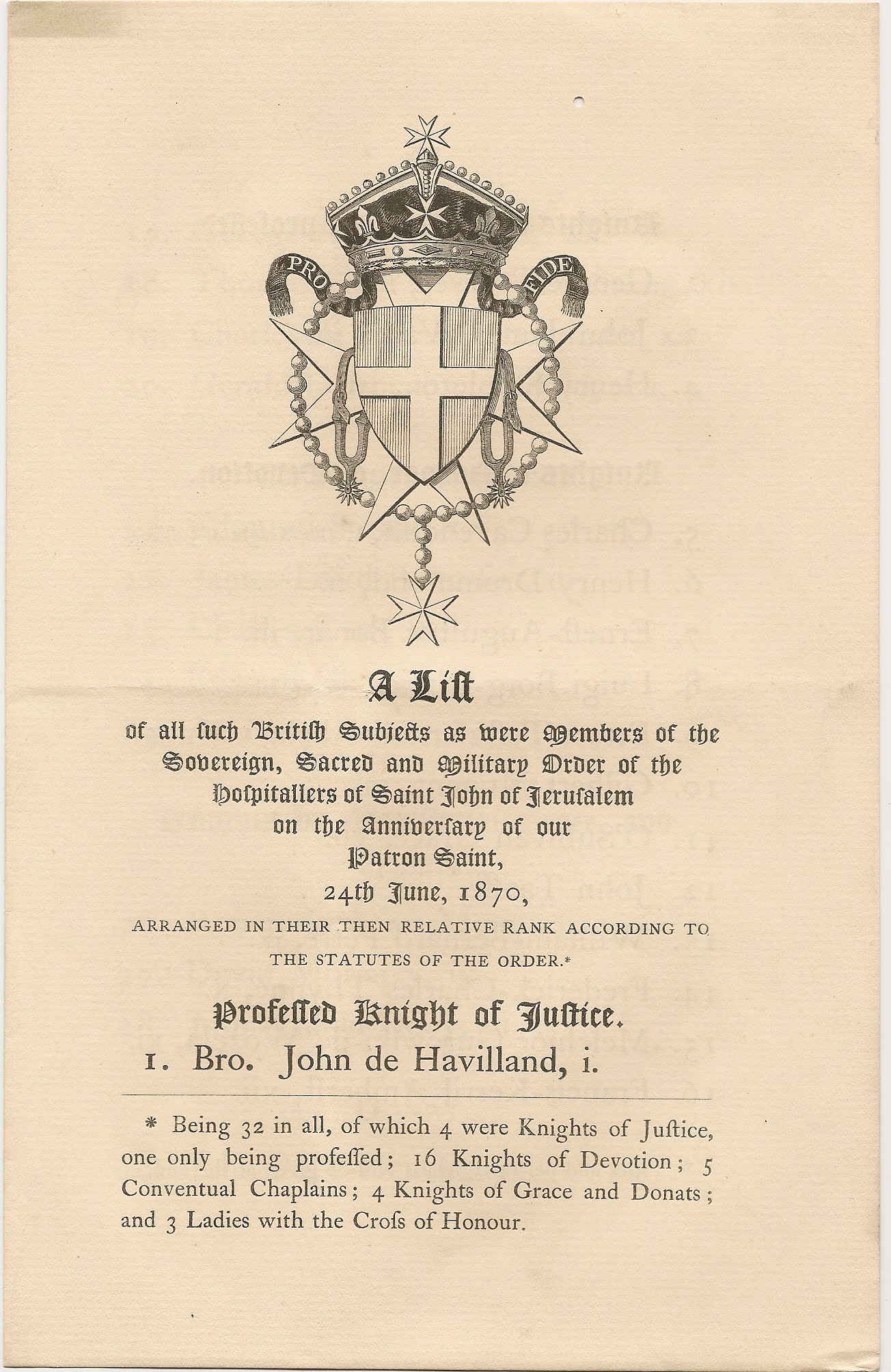

John de Havilland's interest in heraldry and armorial bearings is shown in 1865 when he updated Thomas Fiott de Havilland's 1852 book "A Chronicle of the Ancient and Noble Norman Family of de Havilland". John de Havilland's updated edition gives considerable detail to the lives of his own parents and grandparents with their heraldic coats of arms displayed in the margins. John de Havilland explains that his maternal grandfather, William Ludwig von Sonntag, was born in Pforzheim (modern South West Germany) in 1745. Captain William Ludwig von Sonntag was one of the 10,000 troops of King Louis XVI of France that were sent under the Count de Rochambeau to America to aid the Americans in their Revolutionary War against Great Britain. Captain von Sonntag was present with his regiment at the siege of York-Town, in Virginia, where Lord Cornwallis surrendered, which virtually closed the war; the independence of the States being acknowledged soon after by Great Britain.

John de Havilland also gives a swashbuckling account of his paternal grandfather, James Haviland, as being remembered in Somersetshire for his wonderful strength and cool courage. An example of this cool courage is given whereby James Haviland is captured by the French during a yachting excursion and held as a prisoner at Brest. During James Haviland's imprisonment he defeats a French officer who is the best swordsman in the garrison. The unarmed James' death seemed very likely – after an argument over a card game and after he had floored the Frenchman - as the Frenchman returned with his sword. James parried the sword of the lunging Frenchman and replied with a red hot poker - taken from the bars of a fire grate - into the Frenchman's mouth passing through his cheek thus ending the contest.

In 1872, John de Havilland was made a fellow of the Society of Antiquaries of London. He is also remembered as a soldier of fortune who served in Spain under Don Carlos where he became a General in the Spanish Army. According to a College of Arms Monograph, he was of uncommon physical strength and one of the most picturesque characters in the history of the College of Arms.

In 1880, John de Havilland used the rank of General in his correspondences. At this time, John de Havilland took an active part in politics and was a member of the Liberal Reform Club. Correspondence between the Political Committee of the Reform Club and General John de Havilland from April 1880 until June that year indicate that he could be a colourful and controversial character. The General 'conspicuously canvassed' against the Liberal candidate - Mr. C. Acland - for the Western Division of Somerset.

In statements by a Mr. C. Lamport sent to the Liberal Reform Club in Pall Mall London, General John de Havilland was said to have "voted for the Conservative candidates for the election for this division for the county. He drove into Wellington in a carriage displaying the Tory colours, and himself wore such evidence of partisanship. I met him at the door of the polling booth, and on expostulating with him as being a member of the Club, he justified his vote by stating that 'half the members of the Club, if polled, would vote for the Conservatives.'"

It was resolved that General John de Havilland be expelled from the club. The copy of the resolution also states that: "There can be no doubt that the action of the Committee was prompted by the Radical members of the Reform Club, who for a long time have made war upon those who still maintain the politics of its founders. These Radicals, worshippers of Mr. Gladstone, expelled Mr. Charles Liddell at the same time with General de Havilland. They never miss an opportunity of showing their political liberty towards a "Reformer" showing any independence of character. And General de Havilland having in January 1877 dedicated to Lord Beaconsfield a pamphlet entitled "England herself at Constantinople, the best solution of the Eastern Question," (since then we have acquired Cyprus and Egypt!) these Radicals of the Reform seized upon the fact of General de Havilland's having openly expressed his dissent from the foreign policy Mr. Gladstone advocated before the last general election, and his opposition to Home Rule, as a pretext for his expulsion from the Reform Club."

John von Sonntag de Havilland died on 18 September 1886 and was buried at Langford Budville, in Somerset, England.

== Heraldic career ==
John de Havilland began his career as an officer of arms in 1866 when he was appointed Rouge Croix Pursuivant of Arms in Ordinary. On 26 March 1872, he was promoted to the position of York Herald of Arms in Ordinary. It is also notable that de Havilland helped in the publication of the 1878 edition of Burke's General Armory, which remains a standard reference work for those interested in heraldry.

== Coat of arms ==
John von Sonntag de Havilland's emblem

St Peter's Church at Langford Budville, Somerset, England

John de Havilland used a coat of arms recorded at the 1623 visitation of Gloucester. The arms are blazoned "Argent three Towers triple-towered Sable Portcullises Gules". As York Herald, de Havilland impaled these with his maternal arms of von Sonntag, blazoned "Azure a Sun in splendor proper" in the window of St Peter's Church, illustrated below, and used a Chief of Religion as a Knight of Malta in addition to setting his shield on the Maltese Cross.

The von Sonntag arms are otherwise recorded as "argent a sun in splendour proper" in a 1963 monograph, although this may be an error, as it breaches the heraldic rule of tincture.

John de Havilland's coat of arms can also be seen at St Peter's Church at Langford Budville (near Wellington) in the County of Somerset, England. They are set in a stained glass window there. His father - John Haviland - has his coat of arms on the left. His mother - Mary von Sonntag - has her coat of arms are on the right. It can be seen in the photograph below that John de Havilland's coat of arms is a combination of the parental coats of arms.
