= List of public art in Philadelphia =

This is a list of public artworks in Philadelphia. The Association for Public Art estimates the city has hundreds of public artworks; the Smithsonian lists more than 700. Since 1959 nearly 400 works of public art have been created as part of the city's Percent for Art program, the first such program in the U.S.

This list contains only works of public art in outdoor public spaces, and not, for example, works inside museums. Most of the works mentioned are sculptures.

Most monuments to historical figures are of men. Of about 1,500 city-owned statues and public monuments, just four are of real women.

== Artworks ==
=== Center City and Benjamin Franklin Parkway ===
Image	Title / subject	Location and coordinates	Date	Artist / designer	Type	Material	Dimensions	Designation	Owner / administrator	Notes
	Adam and Eve (Stonorov)	Hopkinson House; 604 South Washington Square 39.9461°N 75.1523°W	1962	Oscar Stonorov		Bronze sculpture	49 x 12.5 in			IAS 75009329
	Aero Memorial (Manship)	Aviator Park at Logan Circle, opposite Franklin Institute 39.9582°N 75.1720°W	1948	Paul Manship		Bronze sculpture				IAS 75009257
	All Wars Memorial to Colored Soldiers and Sailors	Aviator Park at Logan Circle, Benjamin Franklin Parkway and 20th Street (relocated 1994) 39.9583°N 75.1718°W	1934	J. Otto Schweizer		Bronze sculptures, granite base	Height 21'6"; width 17'; depth 13'			IAS PA000002
	Amity (Brown)	10th & Market Streets 39.9516°N 75.1565°W	1977	David Lee Brown		Stainless steel, concrete base				IAS PA001144
	Apollo (unknown)	Hill-Keith-Physick House garden 321 South 4th Street 39.9442°N 75.1483°W	1870	Unknown		Bronze sculpture	60.5 x 25 x 14 in			IAS 88320057
	Ars Medendi	Lubert Plaza 39.948453°N 75.158530°W	2006	Jim Sanborn					Thomas Jefferson University	
	Matthias William Baldwin	City Hall, North Plaza 39.9531°N 75.1629°W	1905	Herbert Adams		Bronze	96 x 30 x 30 in.		City of Philadelphia	
	John Barry (naval officer)	Independence Square, south of Independence Hall 39.9483°N 75.1501°W	1906	Samuel Murray		Sculpture: bronze; Base: granite			City of Philadelphia	IAS 75009322
	Billy (Laessle)	Rittenhouse Square 39.9493°N 75.1718°W	1914	Albert Laessle		Bronze sculpture with stone base				IAS 88320080
	John Christian Bullitt (Boyle)	North Plaza of City Hall	1907	John J. Boyle		Bronze	118 in. x 39 in. x 38 in		City of Philadelphia	
	James Caldwell (Calder)	Presbyterian Historical Society courtyard 39.943°N 75.1500°W	1898-1899	Alexander Stirling Calder		Cast stone	Height 108 in.; Base: approx. H. 7 in. W. 34 in.		Presbyterian Historical Society	
	Civil War Soldiers Monument	Benjamin Franklin Parkway & 20th Street 39.9596°N 75.1727°W		Hermon Atkins MacNeil						
	Civil War Sailors Monument	Benjamin Franklin Parkway & 20th Street 39.9595°N 75.1729°W		Hermon Atkins MacNeil						
	Clothespin (Oldenburg)	Centre Square 39.9524°N 75.1653°W	1976	Claes Oldenburg		Cor-Ten and stainless steel	45 ft. x 12 ft. 3 in. x 4 ft. 6 in.		CommonWealth REIT	IAS 77001303
	Samuel Davies (Calder)	Presbyterian Historical Society courtyard 39.943°N 75.1500°W	1898-1899	Alexander Stirling Calder		Cast stone	Height 108 in.; Base: approx. H. 7 in. W. 37 in.		Presbyterian Historical Society	
	Duck Girl (Manship)	Rittenhouse Square 39.9492°N 75.1724°W	1911	Paul Manship		Bronze	61 x 34 1/2 x 34 1/4 in.		City of Philadelphia	
	The Family	1835 Market Street 39.9535°N 75.1709°W	1982	Timothy Duffield		Bronze	18 ft x 4 ft			IAS PA000496
	Family of Turtles	Fitler Square, 24th & Pine Streets 39.9477°N 75.1801°W	1988	Eric Berg		Bronze	Largest turtle: 16 x 20 x 36 in			IAS PA001086
	1st Regiment Infantry National Guard of Philadelphia Spirit of '61	The Union League, 140 South Broad Street 39.9498°N 75.1644°W	1911	Henry Kirke Bush-Brown		Bronze				IAS 76005394
	Thomas Fitzsimons (Donato)	Benjamin Franklin Parkway & 18th St 39.9580°N 75.1692°W	1946	Giuseppe Donato		Bronze	78 x 32 x 32 in		City of Philadelphia	
	Five Spouts, Frog and Lintel	Columbus at Dock Street 39.9443°N 75.1416°W	1100	Unknown (Javanese)		Volcanic rock sculptures with granite bases.				IAS PA000616
	Benjamin Franklin – Craftsman	Broad Street & John F. Kennedy Boulevard 39.9537°N 75.1635°W	1981	Joe Brown (sculptor)		Bronze sculpture, granite base	10 ft			
	Freedom (Frudakis)	16th and Vine Streets, Philadelphia, Pennsylvania 39.95798°N 75.16602°W	2000	Zenos Frudakis		Bronze sculpture	20 x 8 feet; 7,000 pounds			
	Don Diego de Gardoqui	Logan Circle, Benjamin Franklin Parkway 39.9581°N 75.1693°W	1977	Luis Sanguino		Bronze sculpture, stone base	8 ft. x 32 in. x 30 in.			IAS PA001088
	The Gates of Hell	Rodin Museum; Benjamin Franklin Parkway 39.9616°N 75.1743°W	1880	Auguste Rodin		Bronze sculpture				IAS PA001090
	Government of the People (Lipchitz)	Municipal Service Building 39.9538°N 75.1640°W	1975	Jacques Lipchitz		Bronze with concrete and stone base				IAS 77001300
	Grizzly	Fitler Square, 24th & Pine Streets 39.9477°N 75.1801°W	1983	Eric Berg		Bronze statue, red granite base	24 x 12 x 36 in			IAS PA001085
	Samuel Gross (Calder)	Thomas Jefferson University 39.9494°N 75.1580°W	1897	Alexander Stirling Calder		Bronze statue on red marble pedestal	111 x 48 x 36 in			IAS 76009079; IAS 64860001; Based on the figure in the Thomas Eakins painting The Gross Clinic.
	The Ideal Scout	Bruce S. Marks Scout Resource Center; 22nd & Winter Streets 39.9590°N 75.1752°W	1937	R. Tait McKenzie		Bronze				Cradle of Liberty Council, Boy Scouts of America
	Irish Memorial	Penn's Landing, south of Chestnut Street	2003	Glenna Goodacre		Bronze				Memorial to the Irish Famine and subsequent Irish immigration to America
	Justice (De Lue)	Robert N. C. Nix Sr. Federal Building 39.95145°N 75.15545°W	1940	Donald De Lue		Granite relief			U.S. General Services Administration	
	Keys to Community	Girard Fountain Park, 325 Arch Street 39.952414°N 75.146301°W	2007	James Peniston		Bronze	9 feet tall		City of Philadelphia	
	Kopernik (Talcott)	18th Street and Benjamin Franklin Parkway 39.9567°N 75.1685°W	1973	Dudley Talcott		Stainless steel with red granite base	144 in. high, 192 in. diameter; base 140 in. high, 96 in. diameter		City of Philadelphia	IAS 88320135
	Law (De Lue)	Robert N. C. Nix Sr. Federal Building 39.95145°N 75.15545°W	1940	Donald De Lue		Granite relief			U.S. General Services Administration	
	Joseph Leidy	Academy of Natural Sciences, Logan Circle	1907	Samuel Murray		Bronze				
	Lion Crushing a Serpent (Barye)	Rittenhouse Square 39.9493°N 75.1718°W	1832, cast 1889–1891	Antoine Louis Barye		Bronze sculpture, granite base				IAS PA000020
	LOVE sculpture	Dilworth Park 39.9543°N 75.1657°W	1976 (installed 1978)	Robert Indiana					City of Philadelphia	
	Mail Delivery (South – Cane Cutter – One of Four)	Robert N. C. Nix Sr. Federal Building 39.95145°N 75.15545°W	1941	Edmond Amateis		Granite	108 x 120 in.		General Services Administration	
	Mail Delivery (North – Eskimo – One of Four)	Robert N. C. Nix Sr. Federal Building 39.95145°N 75.15545°W	1941	Edmond Amateis		Granite	108 x 120 in.		General Services Administration	
	Mail Delivery (East – Eastern Mailman – One of Four)	Robert N. C. Nix Sr. Federal Building 39.95145°N 75.15545°W	1941	Edmond Amateis		Granite	108 x 120 in.		General Services Administration	
	Mail Delivery (West -Cowboy – One of Four)	Robert N. C. Nix Sr. Federal Building 39.95145°N 75.15545°W	1941	Edmond Amateis		Granite	108 x 120 in.		General Services Administration	
	Francis Makemie (Calder)	Presbyterian Historical Society courtyard 39.943°N 75.1500°W	1898-1899	Alexander Stirling Calder		Cast stone	Height 108 in.; Base: approx. H. 8 in. W. 28 in.		Presbyterian Historical Society	
	Guglielmo Marconi	Marconi Plaza, Broad and Oregon Streets 39.9155°N 75.1720°W	1975	Saleppichi Giancarlo attributed		Bronze with Marble Base	unknown		City of Philadelphia	IAS PA000186
	General George B. McClellan (Ellicott)	City Hall, North Plaza 39.9532°N 75.1636°W	1891	Henry Jackson Ellicott		Bronze	14 ft. 6 in. x 5 ft. x 15 ft.		City of Philadelphia	
	William McKinley, (Konti)	City Hall, Southeast Plaza 39.9517°N 75.1633°W	1908	Isidore Konti		Bronze figures with Stony Creek red granite base				
	John McMillan (Calder)	Presbyterian Historical Society courtyard 39.943°N 75.1500°W	1898-1899	Alexander Stirling Calder		Cast stone	Height 108 in.; Base: approx. H. 6 in. W. 28 in.		Presbyterian Historical Society	
	General George G. Meade (Calder)	City Hall	1881	Alexander Milne Calder		Bronze	11 ft. 6 in. x 6 ft. x 12 ft		City of Philadelphia	
	Milord la Chamarre	Centre Square 39°57′7″N 75°9′58″W	1976	Jean Dubuffet		Stainless steel with black epoxy paint	24 ft. tall		CommonWealth REIT	
	Francisco de Miranda (Gonzalez)	Logan Circle 39.9581°N 75.1693°W	1977	Lorenzo Gonzalez		Bronze	125 in. height		City of Philadelphia	IAS PA001092
	Robert Morris (Bartlett)	Second Bank of the United States, 4th & Walnut Streets 39.9474°N 75.1479°W	1923	Paul Wayland Bartlett		Bronze	120 x 48 x 48		National Park Service	
	William Penn (Calder)	On top of City Hall (Broad & Market Streets) 39.9526°N 75.1636°W	1888	Alexander Milne Calder		Bronze sculpture				IAS 77001305
	General Galusha Pennypacker Memorial	Logan Circle, in front of Family Courts Building 39.9586°N 75.1697°W	1934	Charles Grafly completed by Albert Laessle		Bronze	156 x 89 x 89 in			IAS 75009258
	Philbert	Reading Terminal Market 39.953395°N 75.159008°W	Unknown	Eric Berg		Bronze				
	Dr. William Pepper (Bitter)	Free Library of Philadelphia	1894	Karl Bitter		Bronze figure with granite base				IAS 76005149
	Evelyn Taylor Price Memorial Sundial	Rittenhouse Square 39.9493°N 75.1718°W	1947	Beatrice Fenton		Bronze with granite base				IAS 75009327
	Religious Liberty (Ezekiel)	Independence Mall 39°57′11″N 75°9′49″W	1876	Moses Jacob Ezekiel		Marble, granite base	144 x 90 x 64 in.		National Museum of American Jewish History	
	General John Fulton Reynolds (Rogers)	City Hall 39°57′11″N 75°9′49″W	1883	John H. Rogers		Bronze	15 x 5 x 5 ft		City of Philadelphia	
	Monument to Scottish Immigrants	Penn's Landing, south of Chestnut Street. 39.9475°N 75.1422°W	2011	Terry Jones		Bronze				Given by The St. Andrews Society of Philadelphia.
	Shakespeare Memorial	Logan Circle, in front of Free Library of Philadelphia	1923-26	Alexander Stirling Calder		Bronze			City of Philadelphia	
	Swann Memorial Fountain Delaware	Logan Circle 39.9580°N 75.1708°W	1924	Alexander Stirling Calder		Bronze sculpture, granite base			City of Philadelphia	Fairmount Park Commission
	Swann Memorial Fountain Schuylkill Girl	Logan Circle 39.9580°N 75.1708°W	1924	Alexander Stirling Calder		Bronze sculpture, granite base			City of Philadelphia	Fairmount Park Commission
	Swann Memorial Fountain Wissahickon Girl	Logan Circle 39.9580°N 75.1708°W	1924	Alexander Stirling Calder		Bronze sculpture, granite base			City of Philadelphia	Fairmount Park Commission
	The Thinker	Rodin Museum; Benjamin Franklin Parkway 39.9616°N 75.1743°W	1902	Auguste Rodin		Bronze sculpture, limestone base				IAS PA001089
	Three-Way Piece Number 1: Points	The Benjamin Franklin Parkway between 16th and 17th Streets	1964	Henry Moore		Bronze sculpture, black granite base	6 ft. 4 in. x 7 ft. x 7 ft.		Association for Public Art	IAS 88320111
	Tomb of the Unknown Revolutionary War Soldier	Washington Square 39.9469°N 75.1524°W	1954-57	Copy of Jean Antoine Houdon's George Washington (1790)		Bronze sculpture, limestone base				Independence National Historical Park
	Triune (Engman)	Center Square	1974	Robert Engman		Bronze sculpture, concrete base				IAS 77001304
	Voyage of Ulysses (von Schlegell)	Front plaza, James A. Byrne U.S. Courthouse; 601 Market St. 39.9519°N 75.1505°W	1975	David von Schlegell		Stainless steel sculpture, ceramic and stone base			U.S. General Services Administration	IAS 75002779
	John Witherspoon (Calder)	Presbyterian Historical Society courtyard 39.943°N 75.1500°W	1898-1899	Alexander Stirling Calder		Cast stone	Height 108 in.; Base: approx. H. 6 in. W. 28 in.		Presbyterian Historical Society	
	John Wanamaker, Citizen	City Hall, Northeast Plaza 39.9527°N 75.1627°W		John Massey Rhind		Bronze				
	George Washington (Bailly)	Original marble: Conversation Hall, Philadelphia City Hall; Bronze replica: Independence Hall 39.9491°N 75.1500°W	Original marble: 1869; Bronze replica: 1910	Joseph A. Bailly		Original: Marble; Replica: Bronze	102 x 31 x 31 in.		National Park Service	
	George Washington Monument (Siemering)	Eakins Oval, opposite Philadelphia Museum of Art 39°57′50.29″N 75°10′44.74″W	1897	Rudolf Siemering		Bronze	528 in		City of Philadelphia	IAS 75009269
	Washington Grays Monument	The Union League, 140 South Broad Street 39.9500°N 75.1644°W	1908	John Wilson		Bronze				IAS 75009304
	J. William White Memorial Drinking Fountain	Rittenhouse Square 39.9493°N 75.1718°W	1921	R. Tait McKenzie		Limestone, bronze relief bust & basin				
	Marcus Whitman (Calder)	Presbyterian Historical Society courtyard 39.943°N 75.1500°W	1898-1899	Alexander Stirling Calder		Cast stone	Height 108 in.; Base: approx. H. 8 in. W. 34 in.		Presbyterian Historical Society	

=== Fairmount Park and Schuylkill River ===
Including Philadelphia Museum of Art, East Fairmount Park, Laurel Hill Cemetery, West Fairmount Park, and Philadelphia Zoo.

Image	Title / subject	Location and coordinates	Date	Artist / designer	Type	Material	Dimensions	Designation	Owner / administrator	Notes
	Anteater		1966	Henry Mitchell		Bronze sculpture				IAS 46200011
	Statue of Abraham Lincoln	Kelly Drive and Sedgely Drive 39°58′11″N 75°11′4″W	1871	Randolph Rogers		Bronze	9 ft. 6 in. x 48 in. x 96 in		City of Philadelphia	
	Statue of Alexander von Humboldt	Martin Luther King Drive South of Black Road. 39.9823°N 75.2059°W	1871	Friedrich Drake		Bronze sculpture, granite base with stone pavers				IAS 75009305
	The Amazon	East entrance Philadelphia Museum of Art 39.9651°N 75.1804°W	1837, 1929 copy	August Kiss		Bronze sculpture with limestone base				IAS PA000011
	Anthony Wayne, (Gregory)	Philadelphia Museum of Art 39°57.884′N 75°10.856′W	1937	John Gregory		Gilded Bronze	130 1/2 x 54 x 46 in		City of Philadelphia	IAS 75009274
	Young Meher (Armenian Genocide Memorial)	east of the Philadelphia Museum of Art 39.9666°N 75.1799°W	1976	Koren Der Harootian		Bronze sculpture, red granite base	168 x 70 x 120 in.			IAS PA000041
	Art	Memorial Hall, southwest corner	1876	Augustus Max Johannes Mueller		Zinc sculpture, painted white, lead coated copper base				IAS PA000161
	Aspiration	Laurel Hill Cemetery central section 40.0007°N 75.1892°W	1933	Harriet Whitney Frishmuth		Vermont granite sculpture				IAS 88320096
	Atmosphere and Environment XII	West porch of Philadelphia Museum of Art 39.9660°N 75.1818°W	1970	Louise Nevelson		Cor-Ten steel sculpture				IAS PA000013
	Bear and Her Cub	Philadelphia Zoo 39.9718°N 75.1952°W	1957	Joseph J. Greenberg		Black Coopersburg granite				IAS 46200007
	Bishop Matthew Simpson	Belmont Avenue & Edgeley Road 39.9946°N 75.2179°W	1896	Unknown		Bronze sculpture with granite base				IAS 88320064
	Catholic Total Abstinence Union Fountain	Avenue of the Republic & States Street 39.9824°N 75.2196°W	1876	Herman Kirn		Marble sculptures with granite bases				IAS 75009303
	Chief Justice John Marshall	Philadelphia Museum of Art, West entrance 39.9665°N 75.1822°W	1883	William Wetmore Story		75 x 51 x 77 1/2	Bronze sculpture with granite base			IAS PA000014
	Coiled Snake	Philadelphia Zoo 39.9729°N 75.1970°W	1940	Ahron Ben-Shmuel		Diorite sculpture				IAS 75009334
	Cowboy	Kelly Drive 39°58′34.68″N 75°11′33.18″W	1908	Frederic Remington		Bronze	144 in. W. 131 in		City of Philadelphia	Fairmount Park Commission
	Dying Lioness	Philadelphia Zoo 39.9492°N 75.1724°W	1873	Wilhelm Wolff		Bronze sculpture, granite base				IAS 75009330
	Fountain of the Sea Horses	Waterworks Dr. in Fairmount Park near the Azalea Garden 39.9675°N 75.1837°W	1926 replica of ca. 1740 sculpture	Christoph Unterberger 1732-1798		Italian travertine.	128 in. Diameter 336 in.		City of Philadelphia	Fairmount Park Commission
	Frank Furness Gateway	Kelly Dr. and Strawberry Mansion Bridge Dr. 39.9955°N 75.1917°W	1876	Frank Furness attributed		Brown Connecticut sandstone				IAS 75009289
	Franz Schubert	West Fairmount Park east of Horticultural Hall 39.9836°N 75.2091°W	1891	Henry Baerer		Bronze sculpture with limestone base and granite with bronze plaque				IAS 75009315
	Frederick Graff Memorial	Water works near Art Museum Dr. 39.9656°N 75.1833°W	1844	Unknown		Marble on a granite base				IAS 88320030
	General Casimir Pulaski	Near west entrance Philadelphia Museum of Art 39.9668°N 75.1824°W	1947	Sidney Waugh		Bronze sculpture, granite base				IAS 88320088
	General Peter Muhlenberg	Near west entrance Philadelphia Museum of Art 39.9666°N 75.1820°W	1910	J. Otto Schweizer		Bronze sculpture, Barre granite base				IAS 88320068
	General Marquis de Lafayette		1947	Raoul Josset		Bronze sculpture, granite base				IAS 75009275
	General Ulysses S. Grant (French)	Kelly Drive 39.9807°N 75.1980°W	1898	Daniel Chester French & Edward Clark Potter		Bronze	174 in		City of Philadelphia	
	General Frederich Von Steuben	Near west entrance Philadelphia Museum of Art 39.9672°N 75.1829°W	1947	Warren Wheelock		Bronze sculpture, granite base				IAS 88320110
	Giant 3-way Plug (Cube Tap)	West entrance Philadelphia Museum of Art	1970	Claes Oldenburg		Cor-Ten and stainless steel	117 x 78 x 58 inches			PMA
	Goethe	West Fairmount Park, near Horticultural Center 39.9837°N 75.2120°W	1889	Heinrich Manger		Bronze sculpture, bronze upper base:, granite lower base				IAS 75009316
	Hippo Mother and Baby	Philadelphia Zoo 39.9713°N 75.1945°W	1955	Henry Mitchell		Bronze sculptures				IAS 75009337
	Hudson Bay Wolves	Philadelphia Zoo 39.9707°N 75.1945°W	1872; Relocated 1973	Edward Kemeys		Bronze sculpture, granite base	50 x 82 x 58 in.			IAS 75009331
	Impala Fountain	Philadelphia Zoo 39.9736°N 75.1961°W	1962	Henry Mitchell		Bronze sculpture, black granite base and pool				IAS 75009339
	Iroquois (di Suvero)	Kelly Drive near 24th Street, north of Philadelphia Museum of Art 39.9650°N 75.1780°W	1983	Mark di Suvero		Painted Steel	42'L x 40'H x 31.8" W		Association for Public Art	
	James Garfield Memorial	Fairmount Park 39.9739°N 75.1905°W	1895	Augustus Saint-Gaudens		Bronze	42 1/2 in		City of Philadelphia	Fairmount Park Commission
	Jeanne d'Arc (Frémiet)	Philadelphia Museum of Art	1890	Emmanuel Frémiet		Gilded Bronze	180 x 56 x 86 in		City of Philadelphia	
	John B. Kelly	Kelly Dr. by rowing grandstands 39.9861°N 75.2018°W	1965	Harry Rosin		Bronze sculpture, granite on brick base	57 x 34 in			IAS 75009292
	John Witherspoon	Horticultural Center	1876	Joseph A. Bailly		Bronze				IAS 76004907
	Joseph Haydn		1906	Idusch and Son		Bronze				IAS 75009319
	Law, Prosperity, and Power	Mann Center, Fairmount Park 39.9844°N 75.2233°W	1880	Daniel Chester French		Marble sculpture, concrete base				IAS 75009306
	Henry Charles Lea Monument	Laurel Hill Cemetery north section 40.0042°N 75.1902°W	1911	Alexander Stirling Calder		Bronze sculpture				IAS 88320018
	The Lion Fighter	East entrance Philadelphia Museum of Art 39.9649°N 75.1809°W	1858	Albert Wolff		Bronze sculpture, limestone base				IAS 75009271
	Lioness Carrying to Her Young a Wild Boar	Philadelphia Zoo 39.9716°N 75.1961°W	1880	Auguste Cain		Bronze sculpture, Quincy granite base				IAS 75009332
	Major General George Gordon Meade (Calder)	Lansdowne Drive 39.980992°N 75.208050°W	1887	Alexander Milne Calder		Bronze			City of Philadelphia	
	Mother and Twins Monument	Laurel Hill Cemetery south section 39.9980°N 75.1906°W	1857	Henry Dmochowski Saunders		Marble sculpture				IAS 71500542
	Negro Leagues Memorial	Belmont and Parkside, SW corner 39.977675°N 75.213700°W	2005	Phil Sumpter		Bronze sculpture				
	Night		1872	Edward Stauch		Bronze				IAS 88320029
	Old Mortality, His Pony, and Sir Walter Scott	Laurel Hill Cemetery north section 40.0042°N 75.1880°W	1836	James Thom		Limestone and plaster				IAS 88320016
	Orestes and Pylades	Oxford Street Entrance to East Fairmount Park	1884	Herman Kirn (from original by Carl Johann Steinhäuser)		bronze, cast by Bureau Brothers Foundry				
	Penguins	Philadelphia Zoo	1917	Albert Laessle		Bronze sculpture, green marble base				IAS 75009333
	Pegasus (Pilz)	Two sculptures flanking the entrance of Memorial Hall 39°58′45″N 75°12′35″W	1863	Vincenz Pilz		Bronze sculptures with stone bases				IAS PA000012
	The Pilgrim (Saint-Gaudens)	Fairmount Park opposite Boathouse Row 39.9701°N 75.1887°W	1903	Augustus Saint-Gaudens		Bronze sculpture, granite and concrete, or fieldstone base				IAS PA000009
	Puma	Azalea Garden, Fairmount Park 39.9678°N 75.1828°W	1954	William Zorach		Marble sculpture, granite base				IAS 88320089
	Rebecca at the Well	Near the Horticultural Center	1908	John J. Boyle		Bronze				IAS 75009317
	Rocky Statue	Philadelphia Museum of Art	1982	A. Thomas Schomberg			8 ft, 6 in			
	Schiller	West Fairmount Park, near Horticultural Center 39.9828°N 75.2118°W	1885	Heinrich Manger		Bronze sculpture, granite and stone base				IAS 75009312
	The Schuylkill Chained Allegorical Figure of The Schuylkill Chained	Original: Philadelphia Museum of Art; Cast: Fairmount Water Works	1825; 1980 cast	William Rush		Original: wood Cast: fiberglass	39-1/2 x 87-1/2 x 26 in			IAS 76007729
	The Schuylkill Freed Allegorical Figure of The Waterworks	Original: Philadelphia Museum of Art; Cast: Fairmount Water Works	1825; 1980 cast	William Rush		Original: wood Cast: fiberglass	42 x 86-1/2 x 31-1/2 in			IAS 76007730
	Smith Memorial Arch: Major General George Gordon Meade, (French)	Smith Memorial Arch, atop south column 39°58′39″N 75°12′24″W	1899	Daniel Chester French		Bronze	8 x 4 x 3 ft		City of Philadelphia	
	Smith Memorial Arch: Major General John Fulton Reynolds	Smith Memorial Arch, atop north column 39°58′39″N 75°12′24″W	1901	Charles Grafly		Bronze sculpture with granite base				IAS PA000525
	Smith Memorial Arch: Major General George B. McClellan, (Potter)	Smith Memorial Arch, atop south pier 39°58′39″N 75°12′24″W	1911	Edward Clark Potter		Bronze	10 x 4 x 10 ft		City of Philadelphia	
	Smith Memorial Arch: Major General Winfield Scott Hancock (Ward)	Smith Memorial Arch, atop north pier 39°58′39″N 75°12′24″W	1910	John Quincy Adams Ward		Bronze	15 x 7 x 10 ft		City of Philadelphia	
	Smith Memorial Arch: Architectural Reliefs	39°58′39″N 75°12′24″W	1903	John Massey Rhind		stone				IAS PA000535
	Smith Memorial Arch: James A. Beaver	39°58′39″N 75°12′24″W	1898	Katherine M. Cohen		Bronze sculpture stone base				IAS 76009283
	Smith Memorial Arch: Governor Andrew Gregg Curtin	39°58′39″N 75°12′24″W	1898	Moses Jacob Ezekiel		Bronze sculpture with granite base				IAS PA000532
	Smith Memorial Arch: Admiral John A. B. Dahlgren	39°58′39″N 75°12′24″W	1898	George Edwin Bissell		Bronze sculpture with limestone base				IAS PA000529
	Smith Memorial Arch: Major General John Frederick Hartranft	39°58′39″N 75°12′24″W	1898	Alexander Stirling Calder		Bronze sculpture with stone base				IAS PA000528
	Smith Memorial Arch: Major General S. W. Crawford	39°58′39″N 75°12′24″W	1898	Bessie Potter Vonnoh		Bronze sculpture with stone base				IAS PA000531
	Smith Memorial Arch: Admiral David Dixon Porter	39°58′39″N 75°12′24″W	1898	Charles Grafly		Bronze sculpture with limestone base				IAS PA000527
	Smith Memorial Arch: Richard Smith	39°58′39″N 75°12′24″W	1898	Daniel Chester French		Bronze sculpture with granite base				IAS PA000526
	Smith Memorial Arch: Two Eagles and Globes	39°58′39″N 75°12′24″W	1902	John Massey Rhind		Bronze sculptures with granite bases				IAS PA000534
	Smith Memorial Arch: James H. Windrim, Esq.	39°58′39″N 75°12′24″W	1898	Samuel Murray		Bronze sculpture with granite base				IAS PA000530
	Smith Memorial Arch: John B. Gest, Esq.	39°58′39″N 75°12′24″W	1899	Charles Grafly		Bronze sculpture with stone base				IAS PA000533
	St. George and the Dragon	39°58′39″N 75°12′24″W	1876	Unknown		Bronze sculpture with stone base				IAS PA000008
	Stone Age in America	Fairmount Park 39°58′19.09″N 75°11′24.79″W	1887	John J. Boyle		bronze	90 in. Diameter 40 in		City of Philadelphia	Fairmount Park Commission
	Sundial		1903	Alexander Stirling Calder		Marble figures and sundial table, bronze sundial plate				IAS 75009313
	The Medicine Man (Dallin)	W. Dauphin St. and 33rd Street 39°59′31.2″N 75°11′11.44″W	1899	Cyrus Dallin		Bronze	8 ft.		City of Philadelphia	Fairmount Park Commission
	Thorfinn Karlsefni	Fairmount Park 39°58′12.72″N 75°11′24.18″W	1915–1948	Einar Jónsson		Bronze	84 x 54 x 48 in		City of Philadelphia	Fairmount Park Commission Removed from the park following vandalism in October 2018. As of 2020, it has not been reinstalled and its future is uncertain.
	Ellen Phillips Samuel Memorial: Settling the Seaboard		1942	Wheeler Williams		Limestone relief, granite base				IAS 88320071
	Ellen Phillips Samuel Memorial: Spanning the Continent		1937	Robert Laurent		Bronze sculpture, granite base				IAS 76006754
	Ellen Phillips Samuel Memorial: Spirit of Enterprise	Just west of Kelly Drive 39.9735°N 75.1908°W	1950	Jacques Lipchitz		Bronze sculpture, granite base				IAS 75009284
	Ellen Phillips Samuel Memorial: The Birth of a Nation		1943	Henry Kreis		Limestone relief, granite base				IAS 88320074
	Ellen Phillips Samuel Memorial: The Immigrant		1933	Heinz Warneke		Limestone relief, limestone base				IAS 76008194
	Ellen Phillips Samuel Memorial: The Laborer		1958	Ahron Ben-Shmuel		Granite sculpture, granite base				IAS 88320079
	Ellen Phillips Samuel Memorial: The Miner		1938	John Bernard Flannagan		Limestone sculpture, granite base				IAS 77002764
	Ellen Phillips Samuel Memorial: The Ploughman		1938	J. Wallace Kelly		Limestone sculpture, limestone base				IAS 88320069
	Ellen Phillips Samuel Memorial: The Poet		1956	Jose de Creeft		Salisbury pink granite sculpture				IAS 76009459
	Ellen Phillips Samuel Memorial: The Preacher		1952	Waldemar Raemisch		Granite sculpture, granite base				IAS 88320077
	Ellen Phillips Samuel Memorial: The Puritan		1942	Harry Rosin		Limestone sculpture, granite base				IAS 88320072
	Ellen Phillips Samuel Memorial: The Quaker		1942	Harry Rosin		Limestone sculpture, granite base	#NAME?			IAS 88320073
	Ellen Phillips Samuel Memorial: The Revolutionary Soldier		1943	Erwin Frey		Limestone sculpture, granite base				IAS 88320076
	Ellen Phillips Samuel Memorial: The Scientist		1955	Koren Der Harootian		Granite sculpture, granite base				IAS 88320078
	Ellen Phillips Samuel Memorial: The Slave		1940	Hélène Sardeau		Limestone sculpture, limestone base				IAS 88320070
	Ellen Phillips Samuel Memorial: The Statesman		1943	Erwin Frey		Limestone sculpture, granite base				IAS 88320075
	Ellen Phillips Samuel Memorial: Two Bas-Relief Panels Eye and Hand		1959	J. Wallace Kelly		Limestone sculptures, limestone bases				IAS PA001131
	Ellen Phillips Samuel Memorial: Welcoming to Freedom		1939	Maurice Sterne		Bronze sculpture, granite base				IAS PA001132
	Station no. 6 – Celebration of Water	Fairmount Park Waterworks, Lower level, north of Spring Garden Street Bridge 39.9649°N 75.1832°W	1989	Ellen Fletcher		Metal sculpture, stone base				IAS PA001138
	Prometheus Strangling the Vulture	East steps of the Philadelphia Museum of Art 39.9656°N 75.1810°W	1943–1953	Jacques Lipchitz		Bronze sculpture, limestone base				IAS PA000001
	Stephen Girard	Near west entrance Philadelphia Museum of Art 39.9663°N 75.1823°W	1897	John Massey Rhind		Bronze sculpture, granite base				IAS 76009985
	John Paul Jones	Near west entrance Philadelphia Museum of Art 39.9670°N 75.1827°W	1957	Walker Hancock		Bronze sculpture, granite base				IAS 88320098
	Silenus and the Infant Bacchus	Kelly Drive 39.9687°N 75.1827°W	1885	Unknown		Bronze sculpture, granite base				IAS 75009282
	Richard Montgomery	Near west entrance Philadelphia Museum of Art 39.9666°N 75.1827°W	1946	J. Wallace Kelly		Bronze sculpture, granite base				IAS 75009276
	African Elephant and Calf	Philadelphia Zoo 39.9716°N 75.1961°W	1962	Heinz Warneke		Norwegian grey Bergan granite sculpture				IAS 75009338
	African Plaque	Philadelphia Zoo 39.9716°N 75.1961°W	1973	Tom Jr. Allen		Plate brass and stainless steel, stone base				IAS 46200001
	African Warthog	Philadelphia Zoo 39.9716°N 75.1961°W	1975	Eric Berg		Bronze sculpture				IAS 46200003
	Agriculture		1876	Augustus Max Johannes Mueller		Zinc sculpture, painted green				IAS PA000162
	Unicorns Were Dancing	Philadelphia Zoo 39.9716°N 75.1961°W	1969	Henry Mitchell		Bronze with gilded bronze horns				IAS 46200012
	William Warner Tomb	Laurel Hill Cemetery south section 40.0009°N 75.1875°W	1889	Alexander Milne Calder		Granite				IAS 88320033
	Giuseppe Verdi		1907	Ettore Ferrari		Bronze				IAS 75009318
	Western Civilization	Philadelphia Museum of Art north pediment, courtyard 39°57′51.55″N 75°10′45.30″W	1932	C. Paul Jennewein		Terra cotta	144 x 840 in			IAS 75009273
	Wrestlers (sculpture)	Horticultural Center	antiquity	Unknown		Bronze				IAS 75009299

=== North and Northeast Philadelphia ===
Title	Image	Location and coordinates	Year	Artist	Type	Material	Dimensions	Designation	Owner / administrator	Notes
Ashanti Gratitude (Brenner)		Mander Playground; 33rd & Diamond Streets; 39.9889°N 75.1875°W	1976	Bernard Brenner		Steel sculpture, painted red	72 x 12 x 12 in			IAS PA000417
Athlete (Brown)		Vogt Playground; Unruh Avenue & Cottage Street; 40.0283°N 75.0490°W	1967	Joe Brown (sculptor)		Bronze sculpture, brick base				IAS 88320120; IAS 75009387
Carved relief		General David B. Birney Public School, 900 West Lindley Street; 40.145°N 75.820°W				Limestone				
Don Quixote		2nd & Girard Streets	1997			Bronze				
The Spirit of the American Doughboy		2nd & Spring Garden Streets; 39.9608°N 75.1413°W	1919	E. M. Viquesney	War memorial	bronze				IAS 47260100

=== Northwest Philadelphia ===
Title	Image	Location and coordinates	Year	Artist	Type	Material	Dimensions	Designation	Owner / administrator	Notes
Bull Negative and Bull Positive		Woodmere Art Museum, 9201 Germantown Avenue	1943	Filippo Bermani		Cor-Ten steel on steel bases				IAS PA000414
Butterfly		Woodmere Art Museum garden, 9201 Germantown Avenue	1964	George Papashvily		Sculpture: granite, base: fieldstone	19 x 39 x 6-1/2 in			IAS 88320127
Civil War Soldiers and Sailors Monument		Market Square, 5500 Germantown Avenue; 40.034325°N 75.172300°W	1883	Union Soldier by John Lachmier; Eagles and plaques by John Massey Rhind; James H. Windrim, architect	War memorial	Granite statue, granite pedestal & base, bronze eagles & plaques	Statue: 114 in Overall: 428 in			IAS 88320047
Corn Bench		Village of Arts and Humanities, 2544 Germantown Avenue	1991	Alejandro Lopez						IAS 74960135
Eagle (World War I Memorial)		Chelten Square, Chelten Avenue & Wister Street	1923	J. Otto Schweizer	War memorial	Eagle: bronze, granite base with bronze medallions & shields	Eagle: 30 x 30 x 24 in			IAS PA000084
Fountain and Sculpture		Nicetown Park, Germantown Avenue & St. Pauls Street	1974	Jon Bogle		Sculpture: metal, base: concrete	144 x 48 in			IAS PA001155
Freedom Corner		Freedom Square, Germantown Avenue & Wister Street	1995	James Dupree		Painted concrete and cowry shells				IAS 74910006
Helical Form		Germantown Friends School, 31 West Coulter Street	1972	William P. Daley		Sculpture: Tomasil bronze, base: limestone	22 x 60 in			IAS 75009365
Hood Cemetery Gateway		4901 Germantown Avenue	1849	William Johnson, architect William Struthers, mason						HABS
Horse		Germantown Friends School, 31 West Coulter Street	1969	Margaret Wasserman Levy		Acrylic	44 x 46 x 21 in			IAS PA000059
Ile Ife Park		Village of Arts and Humanities, 2544 Germantown Avenue	1987	Lily Yeh		ceramic tile, concrete, stone, glass, plants				IAS PA001139
Leopardopterus		Woodmere Art Museum garden, 9201 Germantown Avenue	1987	John Parker			108 x 96 x 78 in			IAS PA000415
Meditation Park		Village of Arts and Humanities, 2544 Germantown Avenue	1991	Lily Yeh						IAS 74960136
Obele Uno (Small House)		Village of Arts and Humanities, 2544 Germantown Avenue	1995	John Horace Stone; Robert Craddock; Austino Okafor; Simone Leigh		Painted wood, asphalt, copper sheeting, marble, ceramic				IAS 74910018
Henry Melchior Muhlenberg Monument		Lutheran Theological Seminary at Philadelphia; 7301 Germantown Avenue; 40.0343°N 75.191925°W	1917	J. Otto Schweizer		Bronze statue and reliefs, granite base	108 x 180 x 44 in			IAS 88320108
Francis Daniel Pastorius Monument		Vernon Park, 5798 Germantown Avenue; 40.036900°N 75.176150°W	1917	Albert Jaegers		Tennessee marble, granite base	324 x 111 x 141 in			IAS 75009363
Teedyuscung; Indian in the Wissahickon		Wissahickon Creek, north of Walnut Lane Bridge; 40.068234°N 75.220326°W	1902	John Massey Rhind		Marble (replaced 1856 wood statue)	144 in			IAS 75009308
Together Family		Mount Airy Playground, Germantown Avenue & Sedgwick Street	1977	Ken Clark		Weathering steel	60 in x 84 in			IAS PA000412
Vertical Form 89-5		Woodmere Art Museum garden, 9201 Germantown Avenue	1989	Thomas Sternal		Steel cage, glacial river rocks	108 x 51 x 51 in			IAS PA000060
War Memorial to Mothers		Wister's Woods, Belfield Avenue & 21st Street	1927	Harry Lewis Raul	War memorial	Sculpture: bronze, base: granite	103 x 74 x 47 in			IAS 75009364
John Wister		Vernon Park, 5700 Germantown Avenue	1903	Raffaello Romanelli		Sculpture: bronze, base: granite	90 x 26 x 26 in			IAS 88320066

=== South Philadelphia ===
Title	Image	Location and coordinates	Year	Artist	Type	Material	Dimensions	Designation	Owner / administrator	Notes
Awakening		Union Baptist Church garden, 1910 Fitzwater Street; 39.9427°N 75.1742°W	1971	Ron T. Pierce		Bronze sculpture, concrete base	58.5 x 22 x 35 in			IAS 88320129
The Batter		Citizens Bank Park; 39.9052°N 75.1677°W	1974	Joe Brown (sculptor)		Bronze sculpture; concrete base				IAS PA000184
Columbus Monument		Marconi Plaza, Broad and Oregon Streets; 39.9155°N 75.1720°W	1876	Emanuele Caroni (attributed)		Italian marble with stone base				IAS PA000620
Connie Mack		Citizens Bank Park	1957	Harry Rosin		Bronze sculpture with granite base				IAS 75009371
Admiral George W. Melville		Philadelphia Naval Shipyard; Broad Street & Preble (Intrepid?) Avenue; 39.8962°N 75.1758°W	1923	Samuel Murray		Bronze sculpture, granite base				IAS 88320105
Play at Second Base		Citizens Bank Park; 39.905°N 75.167°W	1976	Joe Brown (sculptor)		Bronze sculpture; concrete base				IAS PA000185
The Punter		Citizens Bank Park; 39.90°N 75.16°W	1974	Joe Brown (sculptor)		Bronze sculpture; concrete base				IAS PA000186
Guglielmo Marconi		Marconi Plaza, Broad and Oregon Streets; 39.9155°N 75.1720°W	1975	Saleppichi Giancarlo (attributed)		Bronze with marble base				
Mike Schmidt		Citizens Bank Park, Third Base Gate, SE corner 11th & Hartranft Streets; 39.9070°N 75.1678°W	2004	Zenos Frudakis		Bronze sculpture; red granite base	H. 120 in			
Tackle		Citizens Bank Park; 39.90°N 75.16°W	1975	Joe Brown (sculptor)		Bronze sculpture; concrete base	H. 132 x W. 108 x Diam. 72 in.			IAS PA000187
Turtle		Palumbo Recreational Center, 10th & Fitzwater Streets	1978	Eric Berg		Bronze	27 x 36 x 53 in			IAS PA000492

=== West and Southwest Philadelphia ===
Title	Image	Location and coordinates	Year	Artist	Type	Material	Dimensions	Designation	Owner	Notes
The Alchemist (De Lue)		University of Pennsylvania, Chemistry Building, 34th & Spruce Streets; 39.950510°N 75.192050°W	1940	Donald De Lue		Limestone relief				IAS 76009541
All Wars Memorial to Penn Alumni		University of Pennsylvania, 33rd Street & Smith Walk; 39.9515°N 75.1905°W	1951	Charles Rudy	War memorial	Bronze sculptures, granite base				IAS 77001620
Alliance (Day)		Pacifico Ford, 6701 Essington Avenue	1973	David J. Day		Sculpture: stainless steel & a rubber tire Base: concrete & marble	120 x 54 x 36 in			IAS PA000104
Atlas X		4509 Island Avenue (near Philadelphia Airport); 39.8890°N 75.2326°W	1974	Art Brenner		Painted metal sculpture, concrete base				IAS PA000158
The Button (sculpture)		University of Pennsylvania, College Green; 39.95222°N 75.19369°W	1981	Claes Oldenburg		Reinforced aluminum	16 ft diameter			
Covenant (Liberman)		University of Pennsylvania, 39th Street & Locust Walk; 39.9527°N 75.2006°W	1975	Alexander Liberman		Cor-Ten steel, painted red				IAS 77001278
Dickens and Little Nell (Elwell)		Clark Park, Spruce Hill; 39°56′55″N 75°12′34″W	1890	Francis Edwin Elwell		Bronze	144 in. W. 131 in			City of Philadelphia; Fairmount Park Commission; IAS 75009307
Anthony J. Drexel (Ezekiel)		Drexel University, 33rd & Market Streets; 39°57′15″N 75°11′13″W	1904	Moses Jacob Ezekiel		Bronze sculpture with marble base	66 x 54 x 60 in			IAS PA000016
Bust of Anthony Joseph Drexel (Ezekiel)		Drexel University, Main Building, 3141 Chestnut Street; 39.9541°N 75.1897°W	ca. 1901–1903; Dedicated May 3, 1905.	Moses Jacob Ezekiel		White Carrara marble	42 in. 60 in base			IAS 77001201
Flame		Drexel University, SW corner 33rd & Race Streets; 39.958690°N 75.189050°W	1968	Sherl Joseph Winter		Bronze	Sculpture: 91 in			IAS 77001206
Benjamin Franklin		University of Pennsylvania, College Green, in front of College Hall; 39°57′7″N 75°11′37″W	1896	John J. Boyle		Bronze	90 in × 53 in × 59 in			IAS 76005268
Benjamin Franklin in 1723		University of Pennsylvania, 33rd Street, in front of Weightman Hall; 39.9508°N 75.1910°W	1914	R. Tait McKenzie		Bronze	96 x 33 x 41 in			IAS 77001605
Benjamin Franklin		University of Pennsylvania, 37th Street & Locust Walk; 39.952150°N 75.196975°W	1987	George Lundeen		Bronze				
Jerusalem Stabile (Calder)		University of Pennsylvania, Locust Walk, in front of School of Design; 39.9520°N 75.1927°W	1976	Alexander Calder		Steel painted orange				IAS 77001287
King Solomon (Archipenko)		University of Pennsylvania, 36th Street & Locust Walk	1963, cast 1968	Alexander Archipenko		Bronze sculpture with stone base				IAS PA000024
Mario the Magnificent; Drexel Dragon		Drexel University, SE corner 33rd & Market Streets; 39.955400°N 75.189325°W	2002	Eric Berg		Bronze			Drexel University	
Newkirk Viaduct Monument		Northeast Corridor right-of-way, north of the 49th Street Bridge; 39.939455°N 75.210619°W	1839	Thomas Ustick Walter		white marble	About 15 feet tall		Amtrak	
Peace Symbol		University of Pennsylvania, College Green, in front of Van Pelt Library; 39.9526°N 75.1941°W	1967	Robert Engman		Stainless steel	156 x 104 x 3 in			IAS
Running Free		Drexel University, NW corner 33rd & Market Streets; 39.956450°N 75.190025°W	1971	Henry Mitchell		Bronze	168 x 144 x 168 in			IAS PA000017
Edgar Fahs Smith		University of Pennsylvania, 34th Street & Smith Walk; 39.9516°N 75.1922°W	1925–26	R. Tait McKenzie		Bronze	70 in			IAS 77001607
The Reverend George Whitefield		University of Pennsylvania, Quadrangle Dormitories, 3700 Spruce Street	1914–18	R. Tait McKenzie		Bronze sculpture, limestone base	96 x 42 x 24 in			IAS 77001606
No. 3 Williamsburg Series (Engman)		University of Pennsylvania, President's House garden, 3812 Walnut Street; 39.9534°N 75.1995°W	1963	Robert Engman		Stainless steel sculpture				IAS PA000039

=== Unclassified (so far) ===
Title	Image	Artist	Year	Location	Coordinates	Material	Dimensions	Owner
Bear		Dexter Jones	1968	Columbia Avenue Playground, 11th Street & Cecil B. Moore Avenue, northeast corner	39.9781°N 75.1524°W	Bronze sculpture, concrete base		IAS PA000502
Beginning of an Adventure		Karl O. Karhumaa	1966	Conshohocken Avenue & Windemere Street (where?)		Bronze on a concrete base		IAS 75009408
Benjamin Banneker		James W. Washington Jr.	1969	Progress Plaza Shopping Center, Broad & Oxford Streets	39.9770°N 75.1579°W	Granite		IAS 88320137
Benjamin Franklin in Fireman's Hat		Dexter Jones	1968	Fire Station, Engine #8, Ladder #2, 4th & Arch Streets	39.9524°N 75.1464°W	Aluminum		IAS PA000611
Bird Form		Jane E. Stein	1966	Paley Library courtyard	39.9810°N 75.1545°W	Blue marble on a concrete base		IAS 88320132
Bird in Flight		Marco Zubar	1971	Ardleigh & Haines Streets	40.0523°N 75.1647°W	Cor-Ten steel set into a concrete walkway		IAS 75009367
Bird		Harold Kimmelman	1970	Hellerman & Walker Streets	40.0264°N 75.0537°W	Steel sheet, painted blue; pole, painted pink; concrete base		IAS PA000400
Bolt of Lightning...Memorial to Ben Franklin		Isamu Noguchi	1933, 1980	4th Street between Race and Vine, across from Franklin Square	39.955467°N 75.148858°W	metal: steel Sculpture: stainless steel with steel cables; Base: painted steel		IAS 66530048
The Boxers		Ahron Ben-Shmuel	1937	Philadelphia Museum of Art East court	39.9654°N 75.1806°W	Coopersburg granite on a concrete base	H. 61 1/2 in.	IAS 88320092
Boy With Hawk		Charles Cropper Parks	1973			metal: bronze Sculpture: bronze; Base; brick		IAS 76007393
Bronze Figure		Neil Lieberman	1970			metal: bronze Sculpture: bronze; Base: brick		IAS 75009377
Bronze Sphere		Klaus Ihlenfeld	1970			metal: bronze Sculpture: bronze; Base: concrete		IAS 75009382
Buddha		Unknown	1800	Jizo Buddha presented to the Museum of Modern Art, New York in 1954; presented to the City of Philadelphia in 1954 along with the Japanese House and the Shofuso Garden, and then installed in the Shofuso Garden of the Japanese House in West Fairmount Park		stone: Sculpture: stone; Base: concrete		IAS PA000132
Buddha "Siddhartha Gautama"		Blanche Nevin	1900	Originally at Windsor Forge in Churchtown, Pennsylvania, then moved to the University of the Arts, Philadelphia		concrete: cement Sculpture: cement with quartz crystals; Base: cement		IAS PA000176
Burst of Joy		Harold Kimmelman	1977	(th and Market, NW corner)	39.9516°N 75.1552°W	metal: steel Sculpture: polished stainless steel; Base: polished black granite		IAS 77001322 IAS 77001322
Butterfly		Harold Kimmelman	1970			Stainless steel; polished black granite base		IAS 77001328
Butterfly		George Papashvily	1964			stone: granite Sculpture: granite; Base: fieldstone		IAS 88320127
Calvary Scene		Unknown (Italian)	1960			stone: marble Sculpture: marble; Base: cement		IAS PA001166
Castalua		Stella Elkins Tyler	1935			metal: bronze Sculpture: bronze; Base: red sandstone; Basin: sandstone, carved		IAS PA000382
Cat and Fish		Jean Eda Francksen	1967			concrete: Cast-concrete		IAS 75009413
Cats		Henry Mitchell	1974			metal: bronze Cats: bronze; Fountain: granite (?)		IAS PA000385
Center Device		Harold D. Van Houten	1993			mixed: Concrete and Cor-Ten steel		IAS PA000208
Center of Mass I		Ken Clark	1977			metal: steel Sculpture: stainless steel, welded; Base: concrete		IAS PA000413
Central Post		Charlie James	1850			wood: cedar Totem: cedar; Pedestal: stainless steel		IAS PA000619
Charioteer of Delphi		Unknown (Greek) (copy after)	1977			metal: bronze Sculpture: bronze; Base: black marble		IAS PA001128
Charles Allen Smith		Francis P. Moitz	1917			stone: granite		IAS 75009368
Charles Custis Harrison LLD		Frank Lynn Jenkins	1925			metal: bronze Figure: bronze; Base: limestone		IAS 76006522
Charles Lennig		John J. Boyle	1900	South wall of College Hall, Penn (W)		Bronze bust, granite base		IAS 77001625
Child Care		Joseph J. Greenberg	1966			plastic: Reinforced plastic on a concrete base		IAS 75009401
Children Playing		Sarala Ruth Pinto	1800			metal: Sculpture: painted metal; Base: painted metal		IAS 75009389
Children's Hospital Gateposts		Beatrice Fenton	1931	Four gateposts in the courtyard of the Children's Hospital of Philadelphia		stone: limestone Figure: limestone; Base: granite and brick		IAS 88320095
Chimes of Faith		Hunter Malpass	1976			metal: steel Arches: stainless steel; Chimes: bronze; Base: concrete		IAS PA000127
Chimpanzee		Joseph J. Greenberg	1965	South entrance to the Rare Animal House of Philadelphia Zoological Garden, 34th Street & Girard Avenue		Indiana limestone relief		IAS 75009340
Chinese Water Stone		Unknown	1900			stone: Greystone		IAS 74910004
Christopher Columbus		Antonio Venditti	1955			metal: bronze Sculpture: bronze; Base: marble		IAS PA000166
City Seal		Dexter Jones	1966			metal: bronze Gold-leafed bronze bas-relief		IAS 75009353
Civil War Memorial		H. S. Tarr	1865			stone: Sculpture: stone; Base: stone		IAS PA001084
Civil War Memorial		Joseph B. Leach	1869			metal: bronze Sculpture: bronze; Base: Quincy granite		IAS PA001459
Civil War Monument		Unknown	1887			stone: granite Sculpture: granite; Base: granite		IAS PA000108
Civil War Soldier		Martin Milmore	1872			metal: bronze Sculpture: bronze; Base: granite		IAS PA000125
Civil War Soldiers and Sailors Monument		Unknown	1909			stone: granite Sculpture: granite; Base: limestone		IAS 88320058
Civil War Soldiers' Monument		John Lachmier	1883			stone: granite Sculpture: New England granite with capstone of granite from Gettysburg Battlefield; Base: granite; Plaques: bronze		IAS 88320047
Civil War Soldiers & Sailors Memorial		Hermon A. MacNeil	1921			stone: marble Sculpture: Tennessee marble; Base: granite		IAS PA000010
Civil War Soldiers & Sailors Monument		Unknown	1800					IAS 75009309
Clevenger Memorial Fountain		Unknown	1924			metal: bronze Fountain: bronze or copper; Basin: slate		IAS PA000476
The Climbing Stone		Peter Rockwell	1990			stone: Stone		IAS PA000116
Collab I		James Fuhrman	1975			metal: steel Sculpture: Cor-Ten steel		IAS PA001119
Colonial Scene		Harold Kimmelman	1976			metal: bronze Maybe bronze or brass		IAS PA000609
Columbus Memorial		Giuseppe Donato	1952			metal: bronze Bust: bronze (?); Base: stone; Foundation: concrete		IAS PA000477
Columbus Monument		Emanuele Caroni	1875			stone: marble Sculpture: Italian marble; Base: stone		IAS PA000620
Columbus		Unknown	1800			stone: marble Marble		IAS 75009297
Commerce: Seated Male Figure		Alfred Botteiau	1930			stone: marble Sculpture: marble		IAS PA001115
Compass Rose		David Salama	1994			mixed: Plastic, sand, epoxy polymer coating		IAS 74910014
Connectedness		M. J. Kralik	1990			metal: steel Sculpture: probably stainless steel, etched and burnished; Foundation: concrete		IAS PA000472
Cougar		Unknown	1957	zoo? Kelly Drive?		metal: bronze Sculpture: bronze; Base: stone		IAS PA000049
Courtship		Henry Mitchell	1958			metal: bronze Bronze		IAS 77002537
Covenant		Alexander Liberman	1975			metal: steel Cor-Ten steel, painted red		IAS 77001278
Crispus Attucks		James W. Washington	1969	18 in.	Broad & Oxford streets, Philadelphia, Pennsylvania (N)	stone: granite Granite		Progress Plaza Shopping Center; IAS 75009414; IAS 88320136
Dancers		Stella Elkins Tyler	1936			metal: bronze Sculpture: bronze; Base: bronze		IAS PA000379
David Reeves		Unknown	1871			metal: bronze Sculpture: possibly bronze; Base: stone		IAS PA001165
Decline and Rise		Harold Kimmelman	1968	Playground at West Mill Greenway, 51st & Reno Streets		metal: steel Sculpture: stainless steel; Base: possibly concrete		IAS 88320114
Dedicated to the American Secretary		Costantino Nivola	1970	Lobby of Continental Bank, 400 Market Street		mixed: Steel reinforced concrete and sand		IAS 77001320; IAS 88320115
Diana		Unknown	1800					Philadelphia Museum of Art IAS 75009267
The Diver		Thomas Wood	1901			stone: granite Sculpture: granite; Base: stone		IAS PA000103
Dolphin Play Fountain		Joseph C. Bailey	1972			plastic: epoxy Epoxy and fiberglass		IAS 75009397
Dolphins		Raymond Granville Barger	1971	Philadelphia Zoological Garden		metal: Sculptures: metal		IAS 46200002
Don Diego de Gardoqui		Luis Sanguino	1977	Sister Cities Park at Logan Circle, 18th Street & Benjamin Franklin Parkway		metal: bronze Sculpture: bronze; Base: stone		IAS PA001088
A Drinking Fountain		Alexander Stirling Calder	1900	East Quad of the Quadrangle Dormitories of the University of Pennsylvania, 34th & Spruce Streets		metal: bronze Bronze with green patina; Basin: granite		IAS 76005588
Drinking-Fountain		Singer and Talcott	1876			Limestone		AECI 03024654
Drunken Satyr		Unknown	1905	Now at the National Archaeological Museum, Naples, Italy; formerly held by the Penn Museum, which loaned it to the Hill–Physick–Keith House		metal: bronze Sculpture: bronze		IAS 88320063
