= Erik Berg =

Erik Berg may refer to:

- Erik Berg (politician) (1876–1945), Finnish politician
- Erik Berg (Swedish politician), chairperson of Liberal Youth of Sweden since 2022
- Eric Berg (1945–2020), American sculptor
- Erik Berg (footballer) (né Erik Johansson, born 1988), Swedish footballer
