= Robert Nix =

Robert Nix may refer to:

- Robert N. C. Nix Sr. (1898–1987), Congressman from Pennsylvania
  - Robert N. C. Nix, Sr., Federal Building, formerly known as the U.S. Courthouse and Post Office Building in Philadelphia
- Robert N. C. Nix Jr. (1928–2003), Pennsylvania Supreme Court justice
- Robert Nix (drummer) (1944–2012), drummer for The Candymen and Atlanta Rhythm Section
