= Equestrian statue of Anthony Wayne =

Statue in Philadelphia by John Gregory

Anthony Wayne
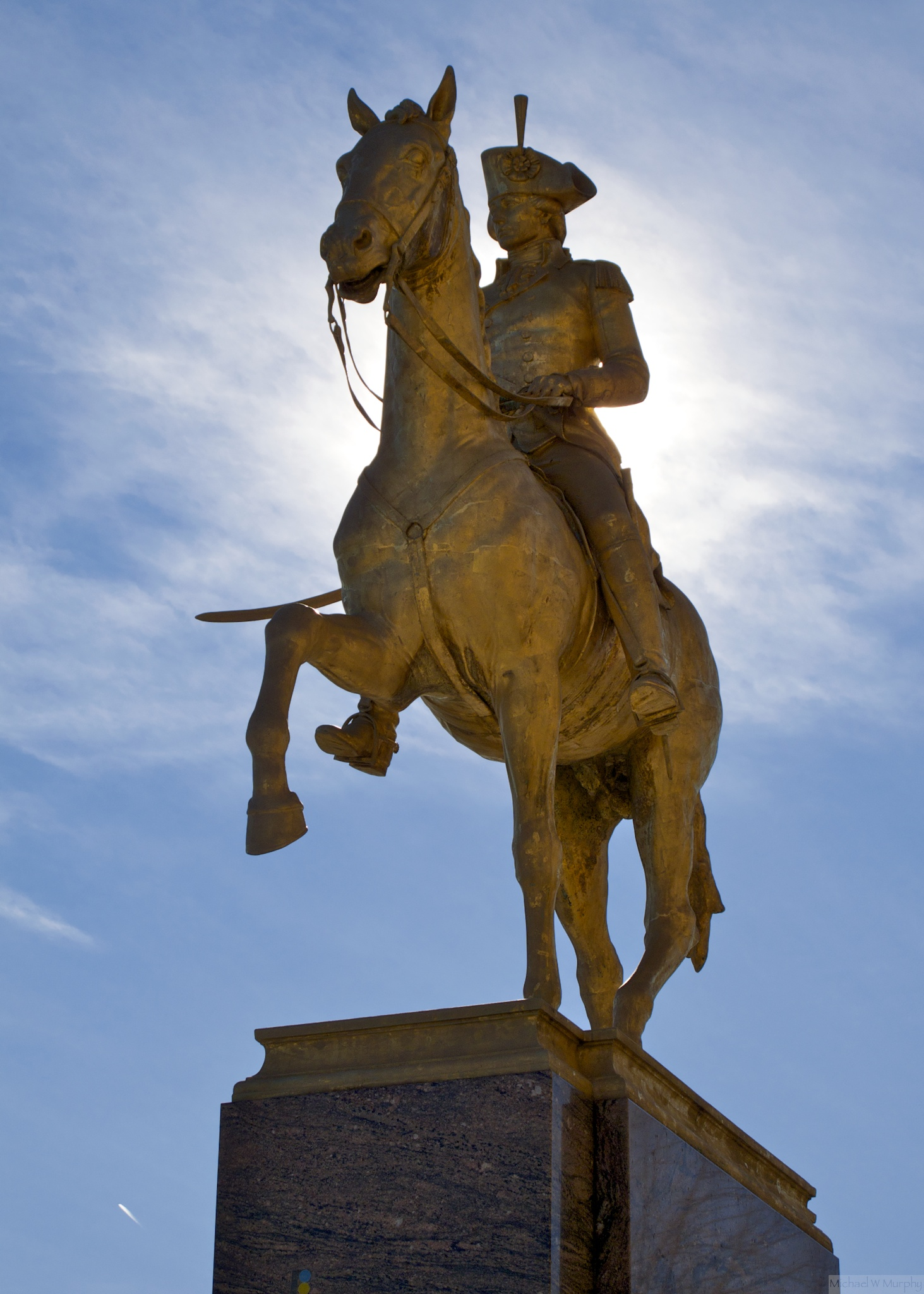
- Artist: John Gregory
- Year: 1937
- Type: Gilded Bronze
- Dimensions: 331.5 cm × 140 cm × 120 cm (130 1/2 in × 54 in × 46 in)
- Location: Philadelphia, Pennsylvania, United States; 39°57.884′N 75°10.856′W
- Owner: City of Philadelphia; Fairmount Park Commission

Anthony Wayne is a gilded bronze equestrian sculpture of Anthony Wayne, by John Gregory at the Philadelphia Museum of Art. It is located at 26th Street and the Benjamin Franklin Parkway. It was dedicated on September 17, 1937.

The inscription reads:
(Base, plaques on both north and south sides:)
Sons of the Revolution
Exegi Monumentum Aere Perennius 1776–1883
(Base, north side above plaque, in raised letters:)
Anthony Wayne
1745–1796
The inscription at the foot of base reads:
Anthony Wayne
A memorial of his valour
a tribute to his achievements
in the War of Independence
The Pennsylvania Society
Sons of the Revolution
Here inscribe his name
in honor
1937.

== See also ==
- List of public art in Philadelphia
