= Mail Delivery (sculptures) =

Coordinates: 39.9510°N 75.1554°W

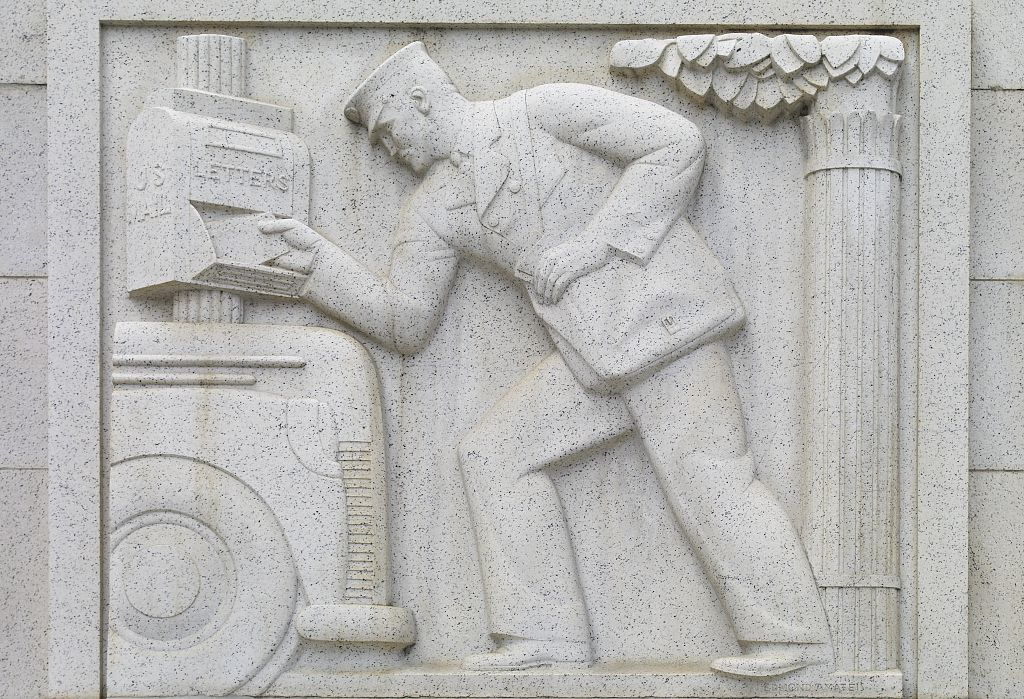
Mail Delivery East

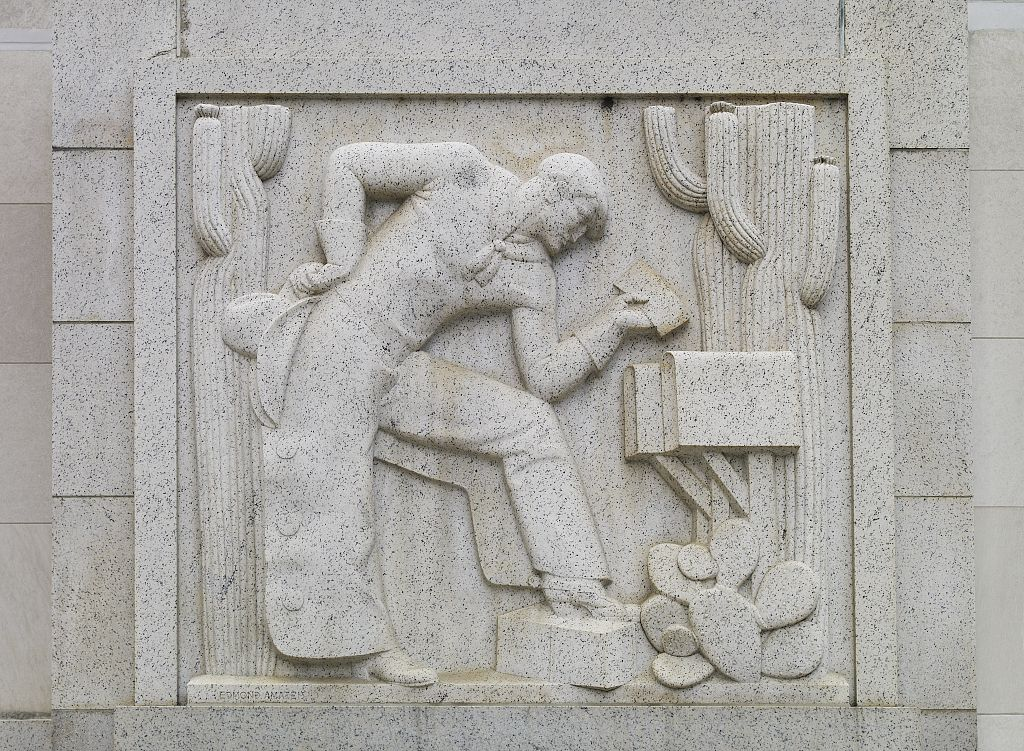
Mail Delivery West

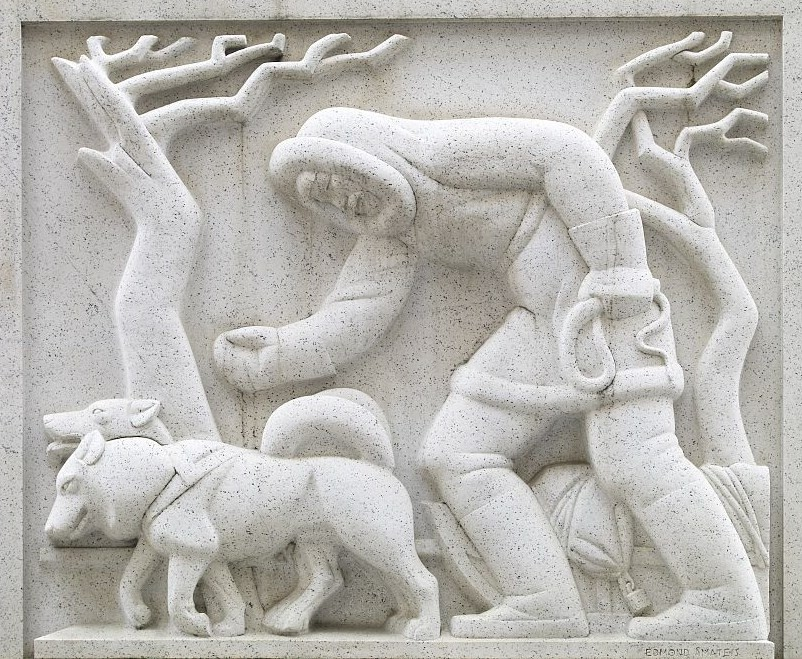
Mail Delivery North

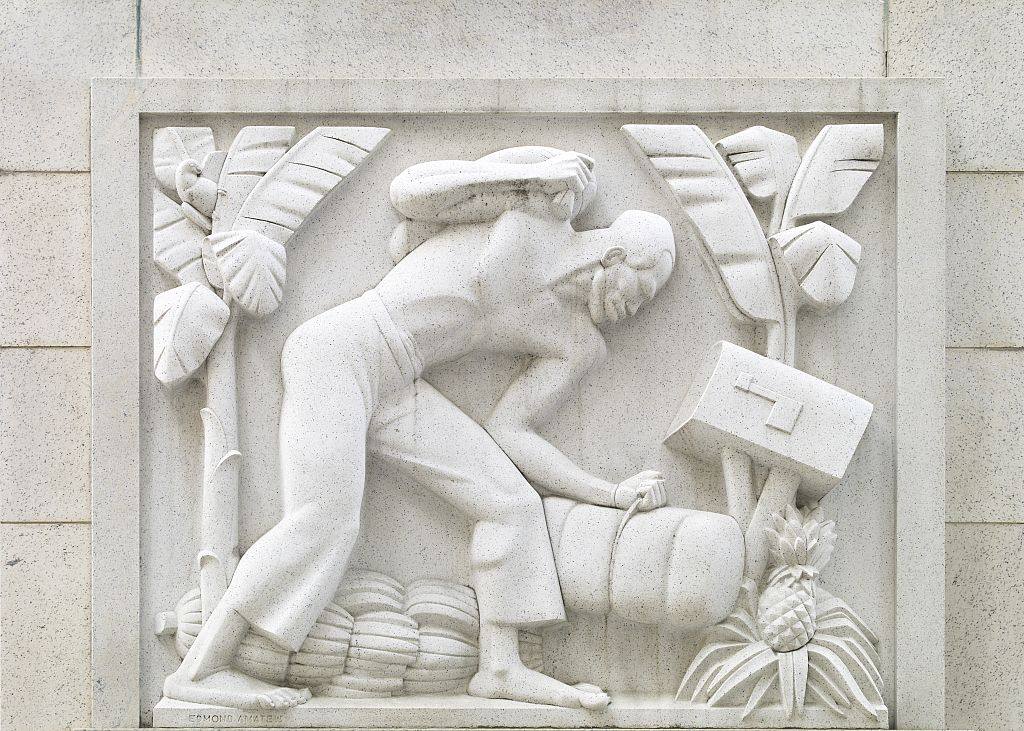
Mail Delivery South

Mail Delivery is a set of four relief sculptures by Edmond Amateis completed in 1941 for the Section of Painting and Sculpture and displayed at the U.S. Court House and Post Office Building in Philadelphia, now called the Robert N. C. Nix, Sr., Federal Building, at 9th and Market Streets. The reliefs are carved in granite and each measures about 108 inches (2.7 m) in height by 120 inches (3.0 m) in width.

The reliefs show the efforts of postal carriers delivering mail to the "four corners" of America. The East and West reliefs flank an entrance on 9th Street near Market Street. The North and South reliefs flank an entrance further south on 9th Street near Chestnut Street. Noted photographer and former Philadelphian Carol M. Highsmith photographed the reliefs as part of an assignment for the U.S. General Services Administration.

== East ==
A fairly traditional 1940s scene represents the East. A postal carrier is dressed in a double-breasted uniform jacket and small round cap. He is bent over, like all the subjects in the reliefs, in this case over the front bumper of car and a mailbox attached to a fluted column. With his right hand he reaches toward the mailbox and he carries a mail pouch slung over his left shoulder. Another fluted column and the leaves of a tree complete the scene.

== West ==
A "Wild West" scene represents the West. A cowboy dressed in chaps, cowboy boots, a shirt and bandanna, and heavy gloves delivers letters to rural mailboxes. His cowboy hat in his right hand rests on his right hip. Three or four cacti complete the scene.

== North ==
An Arctic scene represents the North. An Eskimo dressed in a hooded parka bends over his dog sled, which is loaded with mail bags. He reaches over the two sled dogs with his right hand and holds a whip in his left. Two bare trees complete the scene.

== South ==
A scene from the Panama Canal Zone represents the South. A bare-chested man of African descent dressed in only a pair of trousers delivers mail to a rural mailbox. He is bending over, carrying a bag of mail over his right shoulder and lifting a bundle of mail with his left hand. Two palm trees, a large cluster of bananas and a pineapple complete the scene.

== See also ==
- List of public art in Philadelphia
