= Statue of Anthony J. Drexel =

Sculpture by Moses Jacob Ezekiel

Anthony J. Drexel
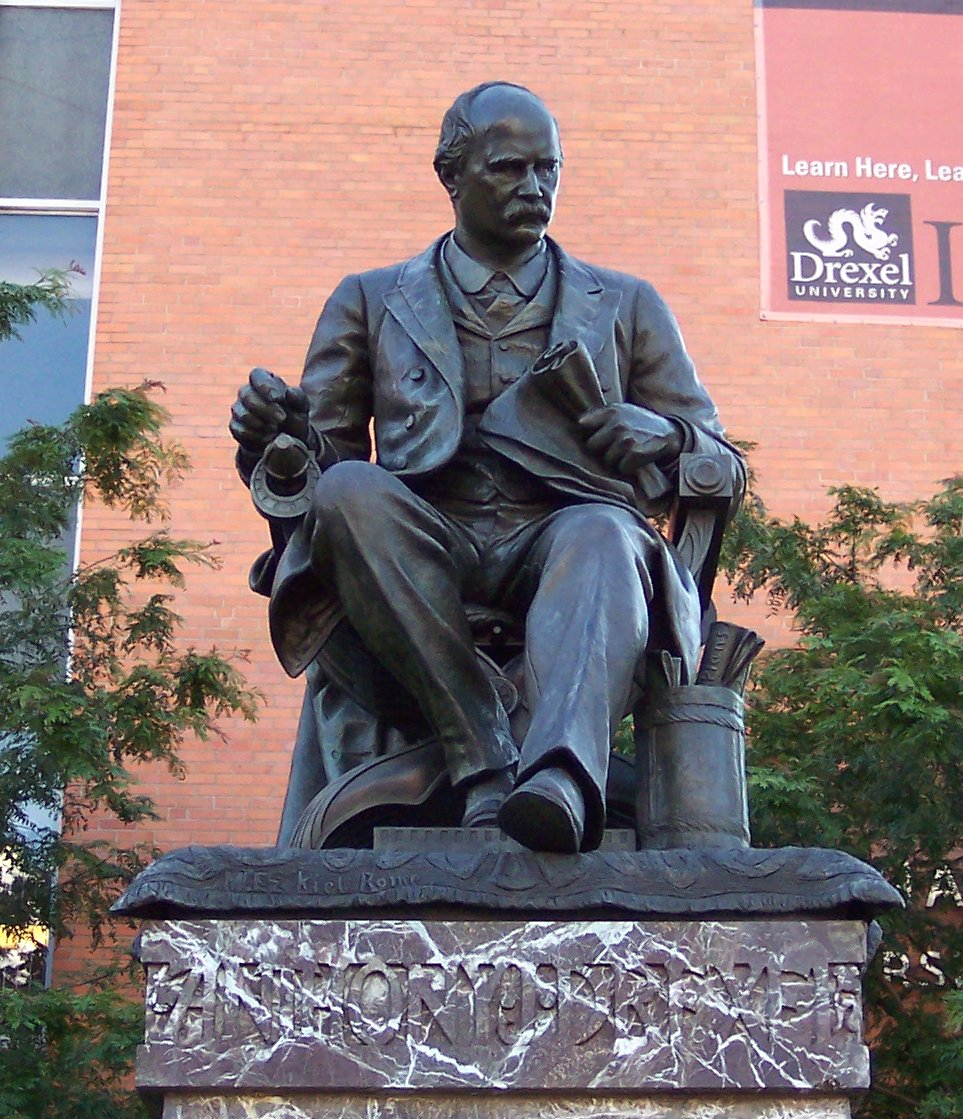
- Artist: Moses Jacob Ezekiel
- Year: 1904
- Type: Bronze
- Dimensions: 170 cm × 140 cm × 150 cm (66 in × 54 in × 60 in)
- Location: Philadelphia; 39°57′14.68″N 75°11′12.76″W
- Owner: Drexel University

Anthony J. Drexel is a bronze statue by Moses Jacob Ezekiel of Drexel University founder Anthony Joseph Drexel. It is located at 32nd Street and Market Street, Philadelphia.

It was dedicated on June 17, 1905, at Belmont and Lansdowne Avenues. It was relocated to Drexel University, in December 1966, and again in 2003.

The inscription reads:
(Sculpture, proper right front, on oriental carpet near base:)

M. Ezekiel

(Base, front:)

ANTHONY J. DREXEL

A SON OF PHILADELPHIA WHO
DID HONOR TO HIS NATIVE CITY
BY THE UPRIGHTNESS OF HIS
LIFE HIS INTEGRITY AS A
GREAT FINANCIER AND HIS
GENEROUS INTEREST
IN THE PUBLIC

WELFARE

(Base, left side:)
FOUNDER OF THE DREXEL
1826 1893
(Base, rear:)
INSTITUTE OF ART
PRESENTED TO THE CITIZENS
OF PHILADELPHIA BY HIS FRIEND JOHN H. HARJES
1904
(Base, right side:)
SCIENCE AND INDUSTRY
1826 1893 signed

== See also ==
- List of public art in Philadelphia
