= Pegasus (Pilz) =

Coordinates: 39°58′45.12″N 75°12′34.9″W

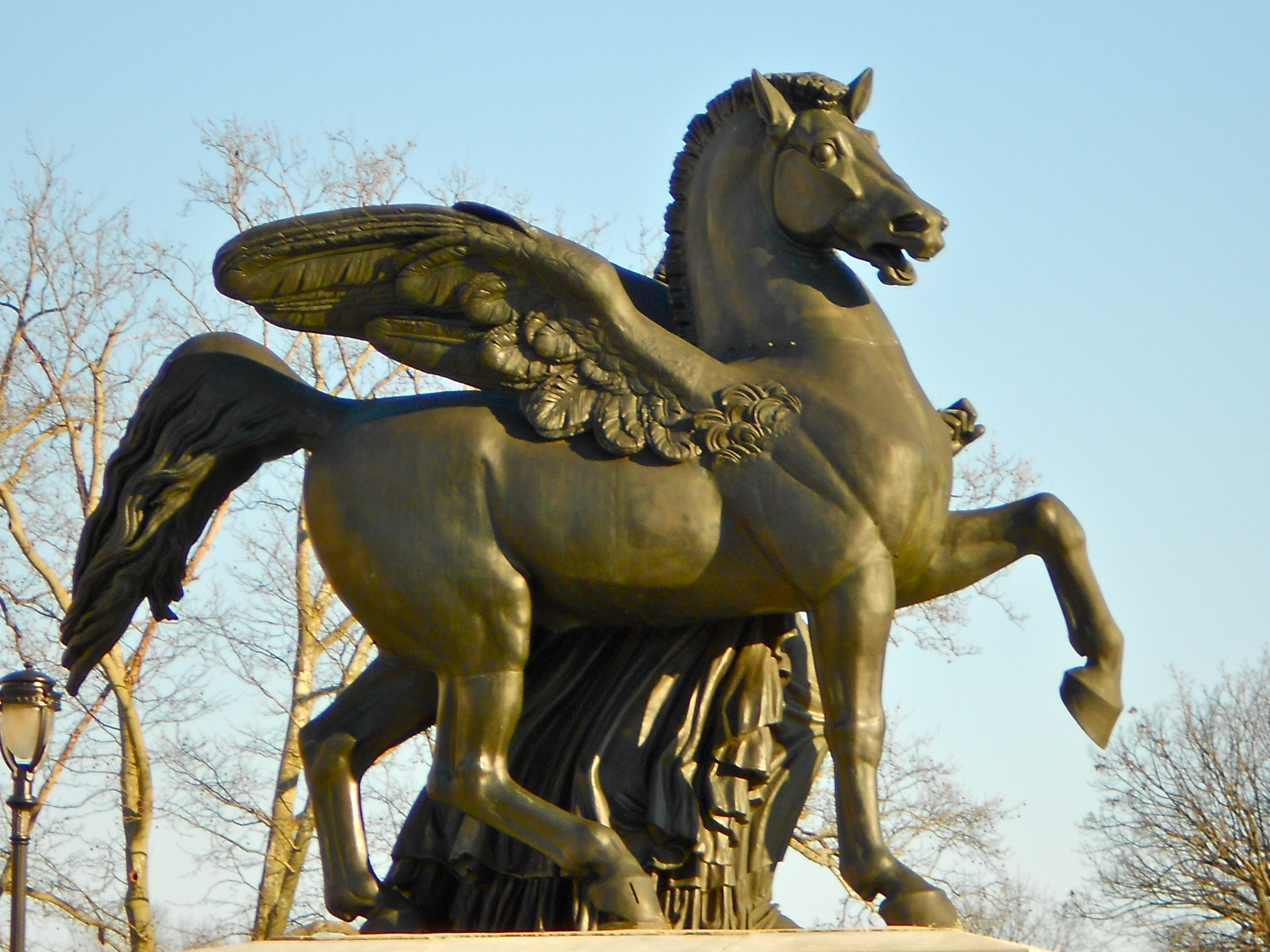
- Artist: Vincenz Pilz
- Year: ca. 1863
- Type: Bronze
- Dimensions: 270 cm × 230 cm × 610 cm (105 in × 90 in × 240 in)
- Location: Philadelphia
- Owner: Fairmount Park

Pegasus Tamed by the Muses Erato and Calliope are a pair of mirrored bronze sculptures designed by Vincenz Pilz. Each sculpture depicts Pegasus accompanied by a muse from Greek mythology. Erato, who represents love poetry and carries a lyre, is on the left sculpture and Calliope, who represents epic poetry and carries a scroll, is on the right. The sculptures, which are also known as the Flying Horses or the Pegagus group, are located at Memorial Hall, a National Historic Landmark in Philadelphia.

Pilz designed the Pegasus sculptures for the Vienna State Opera in 1863. However, the Austrian government ordered the sculptures to be removed from the site of the Opera house and melted down after they were deemed to be disproportionately-sized for the building. Instead of being destroyed as directed, the sculptures were purchased by Philadelphia businessman and philanthropist Robert H. Gratz as a gift for Philadelphia's newly established Fairmont Park. The sculptures were deconstructed into pieces and shipped to the United States, where they were reassembled and installed in front of Memorial Hall for the Centennial Exposition in 1876.

In 2017, the sculptures were again disassembled for conservation after a crack was discovered in one of the Pegasus's legs during a 2013 assessment by the Philadelphia's Office of Arts, Culture, and Creative Economy (OACCE). The conservation and restoration work was performed by Materials Conservation Co., and received a 2018 Grand Jury Award from the Preservation Alliance for Greater Philadelphia.

== See also ==
- List of public art in Philadelphia
