= Witherspoon Building =

- U.S. National Register of Historic Places
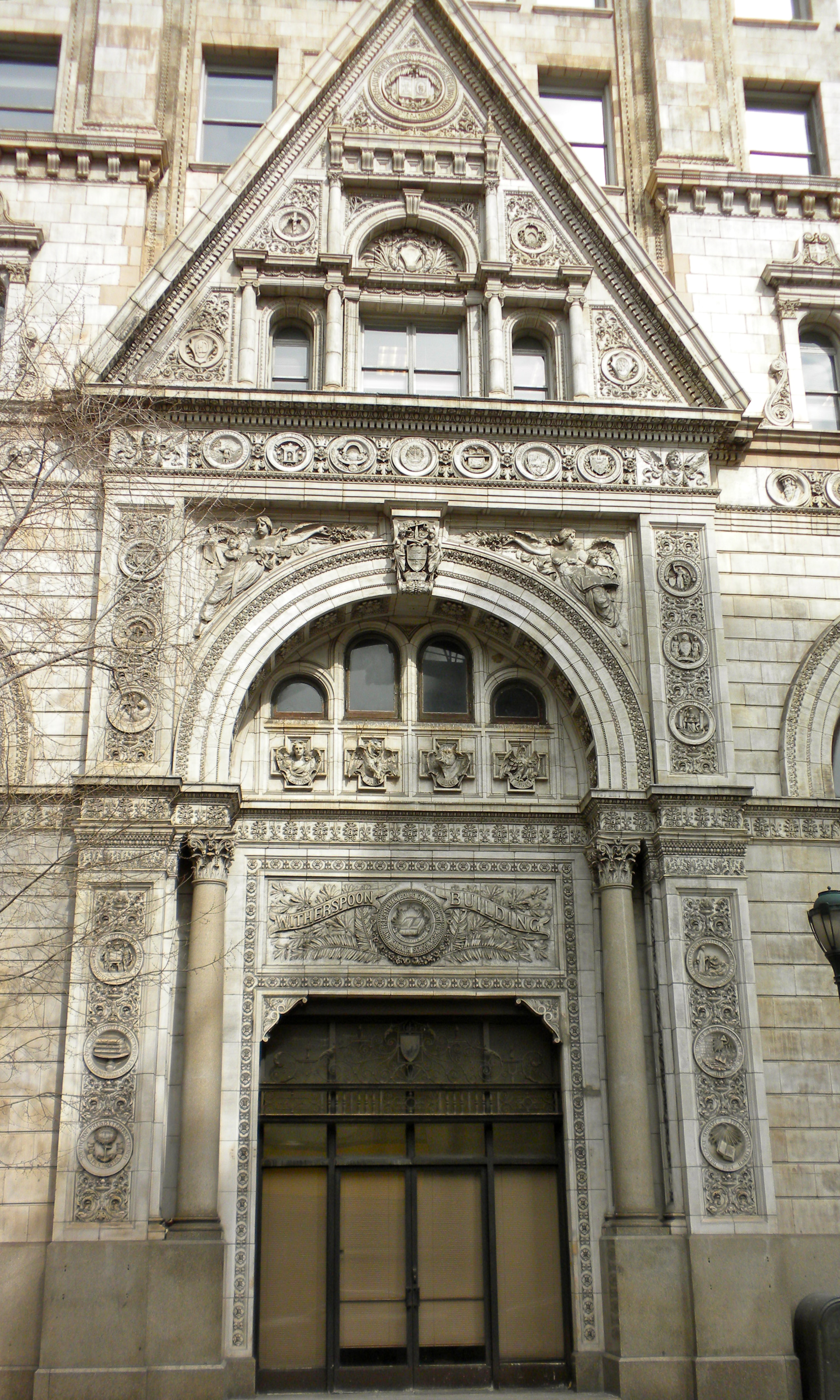
- Witherspoon Building entrance, February 2010

- Location within Philadelphia Location within Pennsylvania Location within the United States
- Location: 1321 Walnut Street, Philadelphia, Pennsylvania
- Coordinates: 39°56′58″N 75°9′48″W
- Area: 0.3 acres (0.12 ha)
- Built: 1896
- Architect: Huston, Joseph; Et al.
- Architectural style: Skyscraper
- NRHP reference No.: 78002462
- Added to NRHP: September 18, 1978

Witherspoon Building is a historic office building located in the Market East neighborhood of Philadelphia, Pennsylvania. It was designed by architect Joseph M. Huston (1866–1940) and built in 1896. It was built for the Presbyterian Board of Publications and Sabbath School Work. It is an 11-story, steel frame E-shaped building, faced with brick and granite. It has terra cotta decorative elements. Its exterior features Corinthian order and Ionic order columns, statues, medallions, seals of various boards and agencies of the Presbyterian Church and of related Reformed churches. It is named for John Witherspoon (1723–1794), a president of Princeton University.

It was the original location of the Philadelphia College and Infirmary of Osteopathy, which was established in 1899.

It was added to the National Register of Historic Places in 1978.

== Sculpture ==
Several statues and some of the medallions were designed by sculptor Alexander Stirling Calder (1870–1945), including statues of six historically prominent Presbyterians, Francis Makemie, John Witherspoon, John McMillan, Samuel Davies, James Caldwell and Marcus Whitman. These sculptures were removed in 1961 and later moved to the courtyard of the Presbyterian Historical Society in Philadelphia.

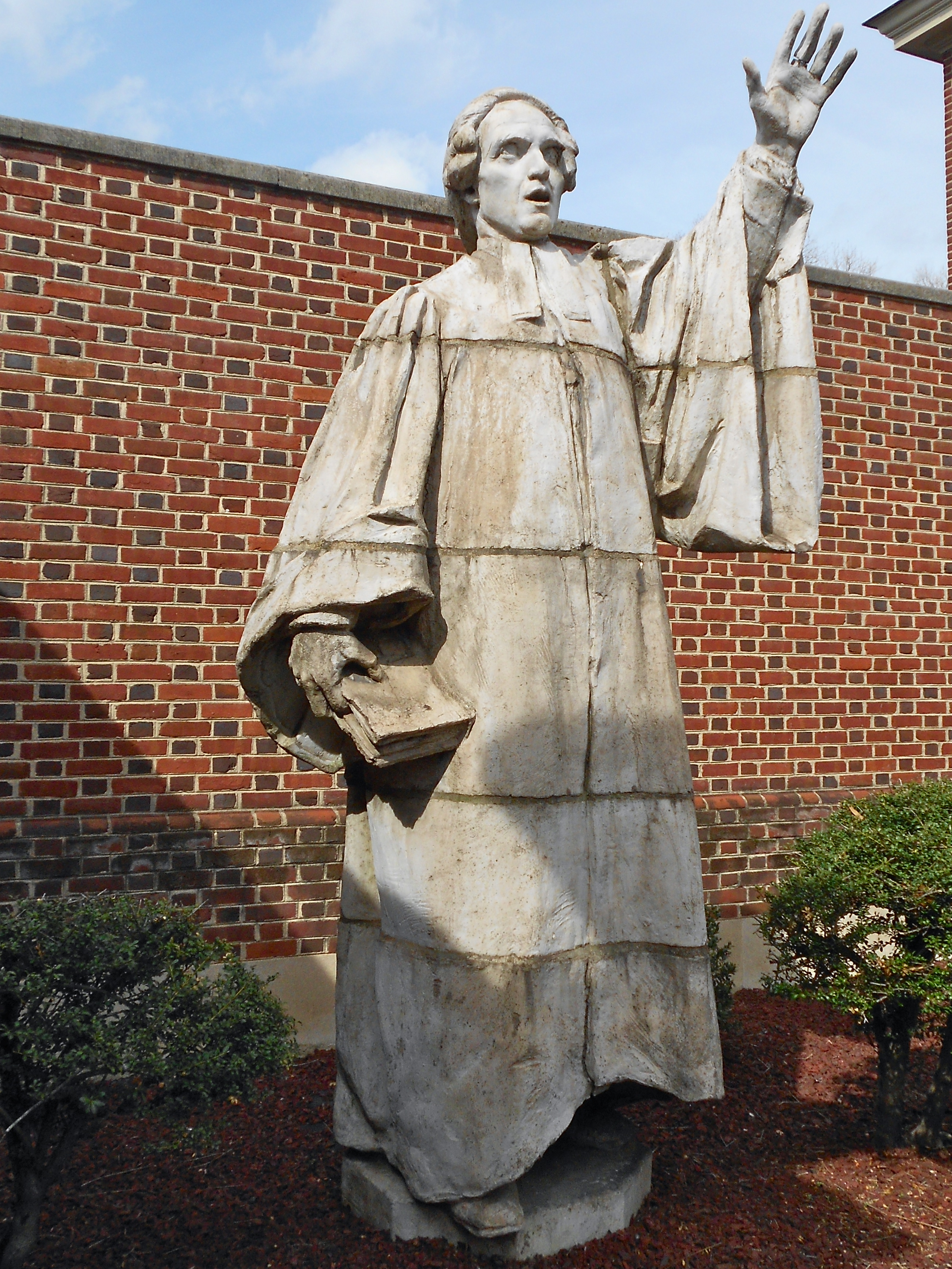
Francis Makemie

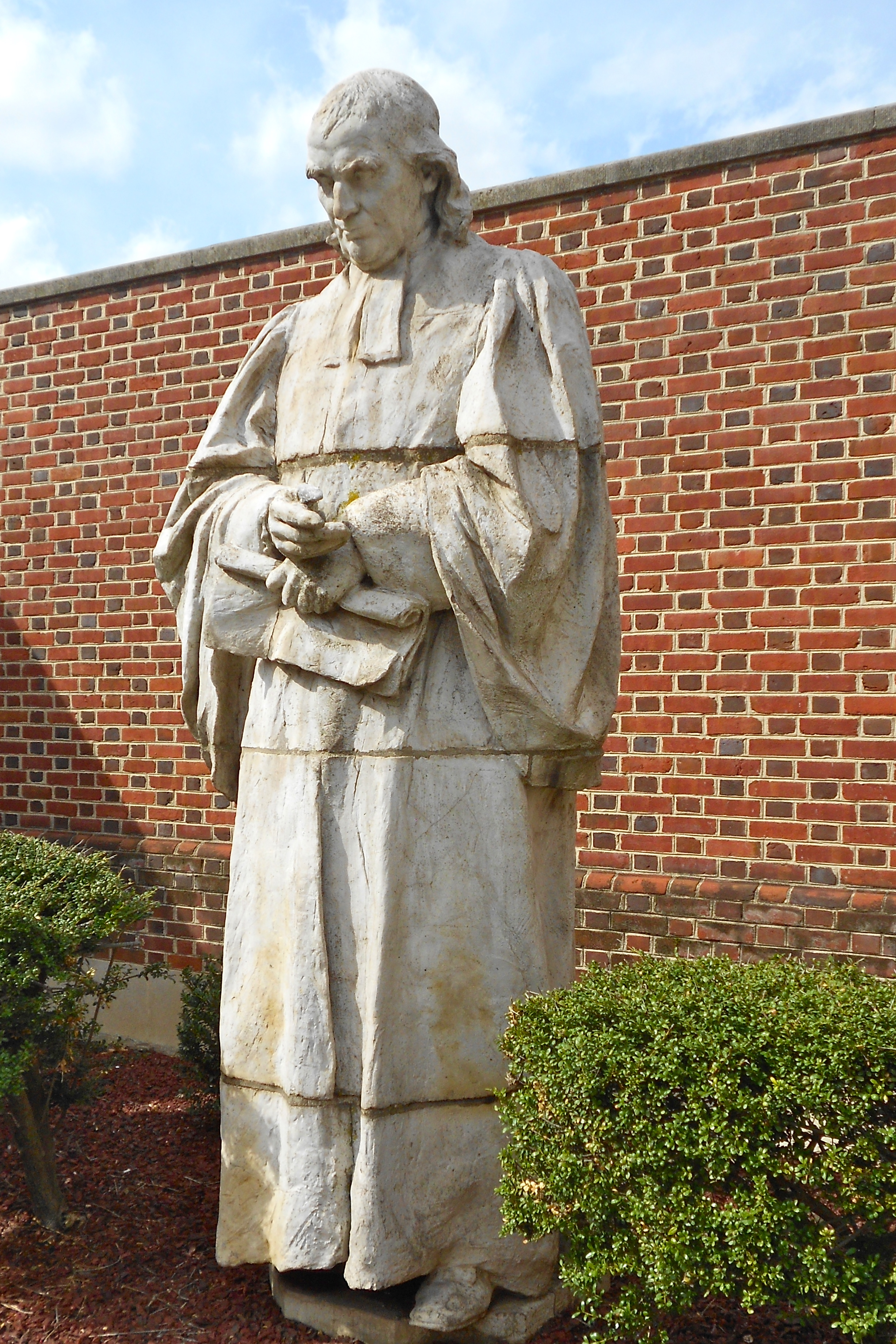
John Witherspoon

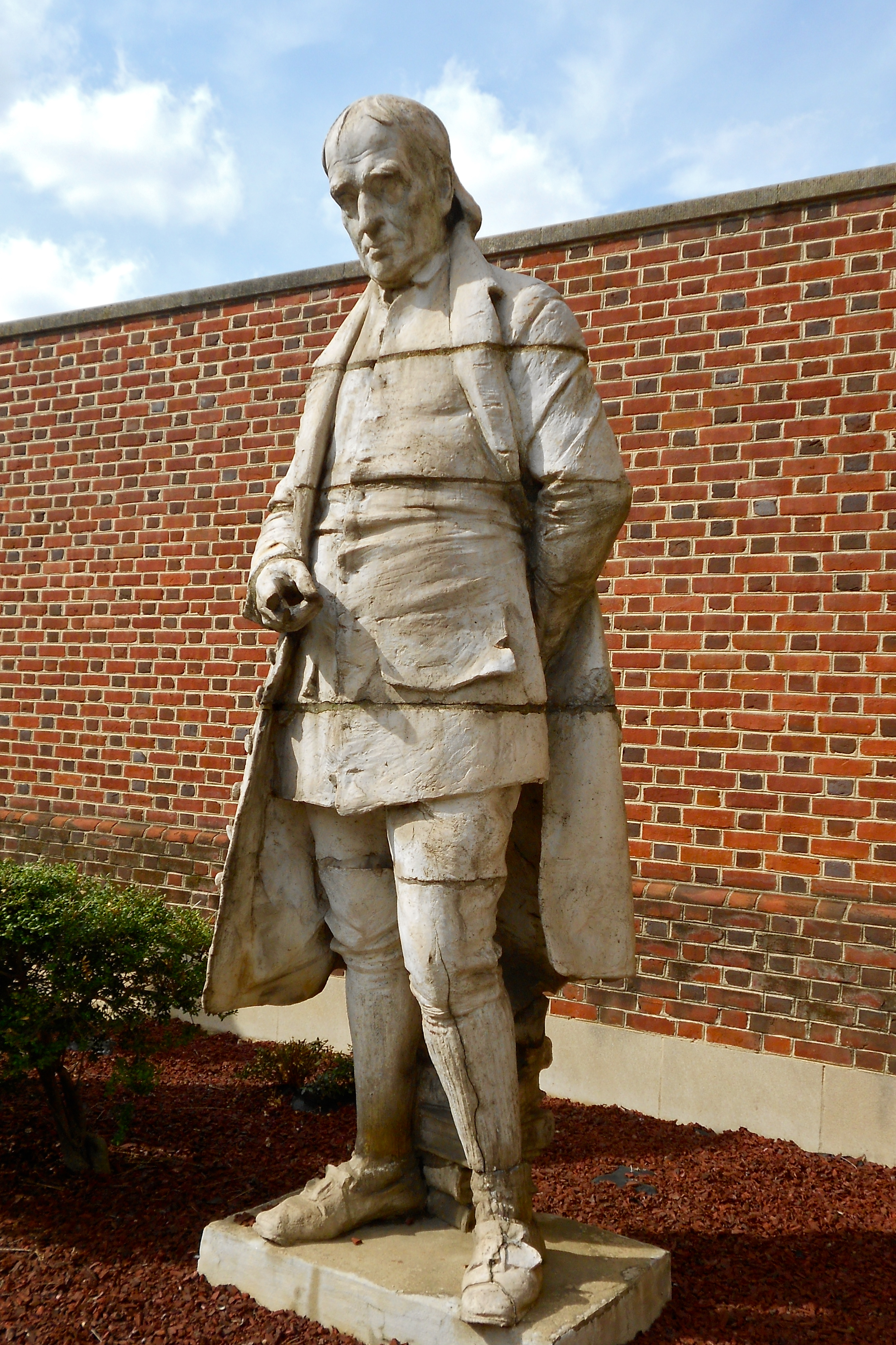
John McMillan
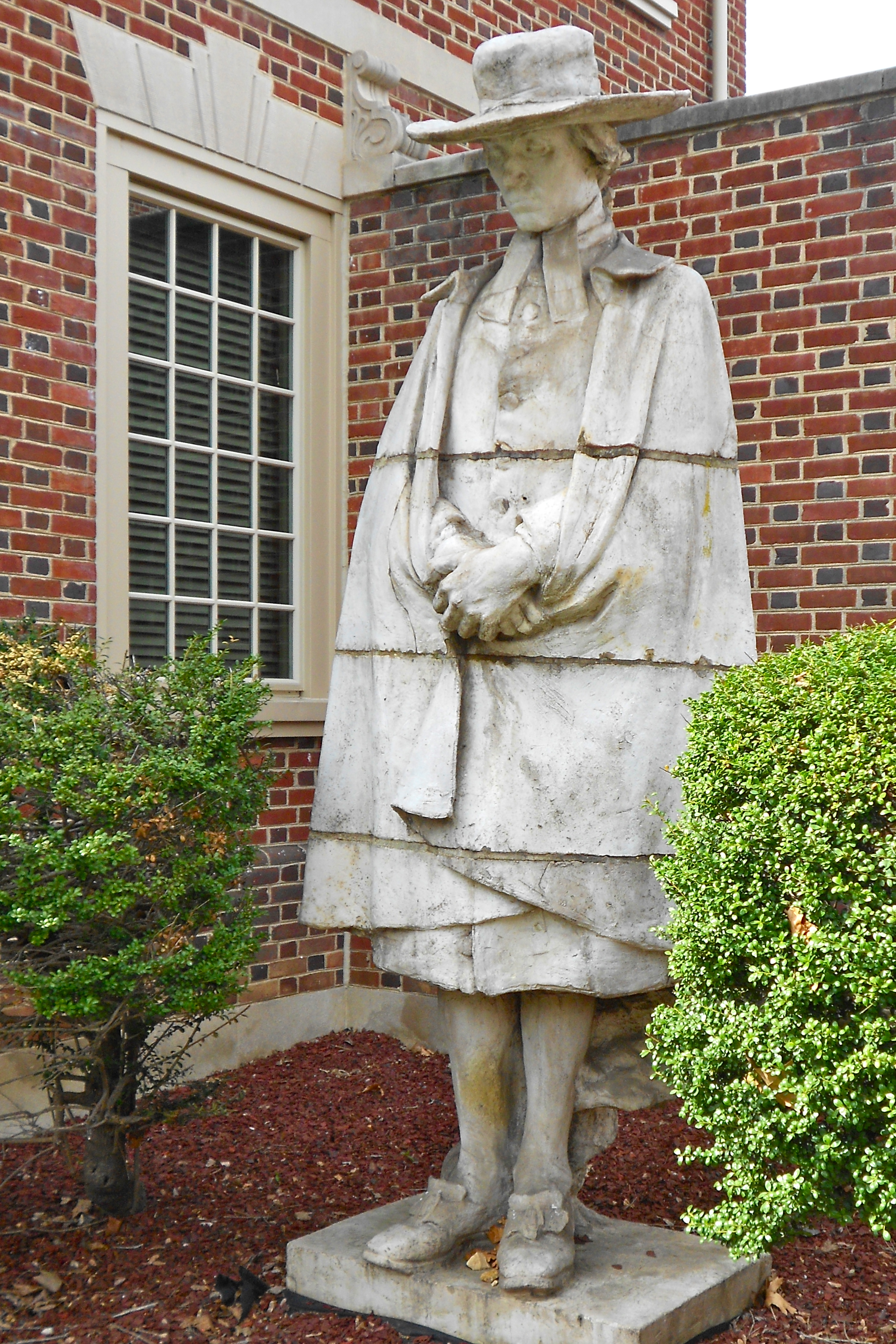
Samuel Davies

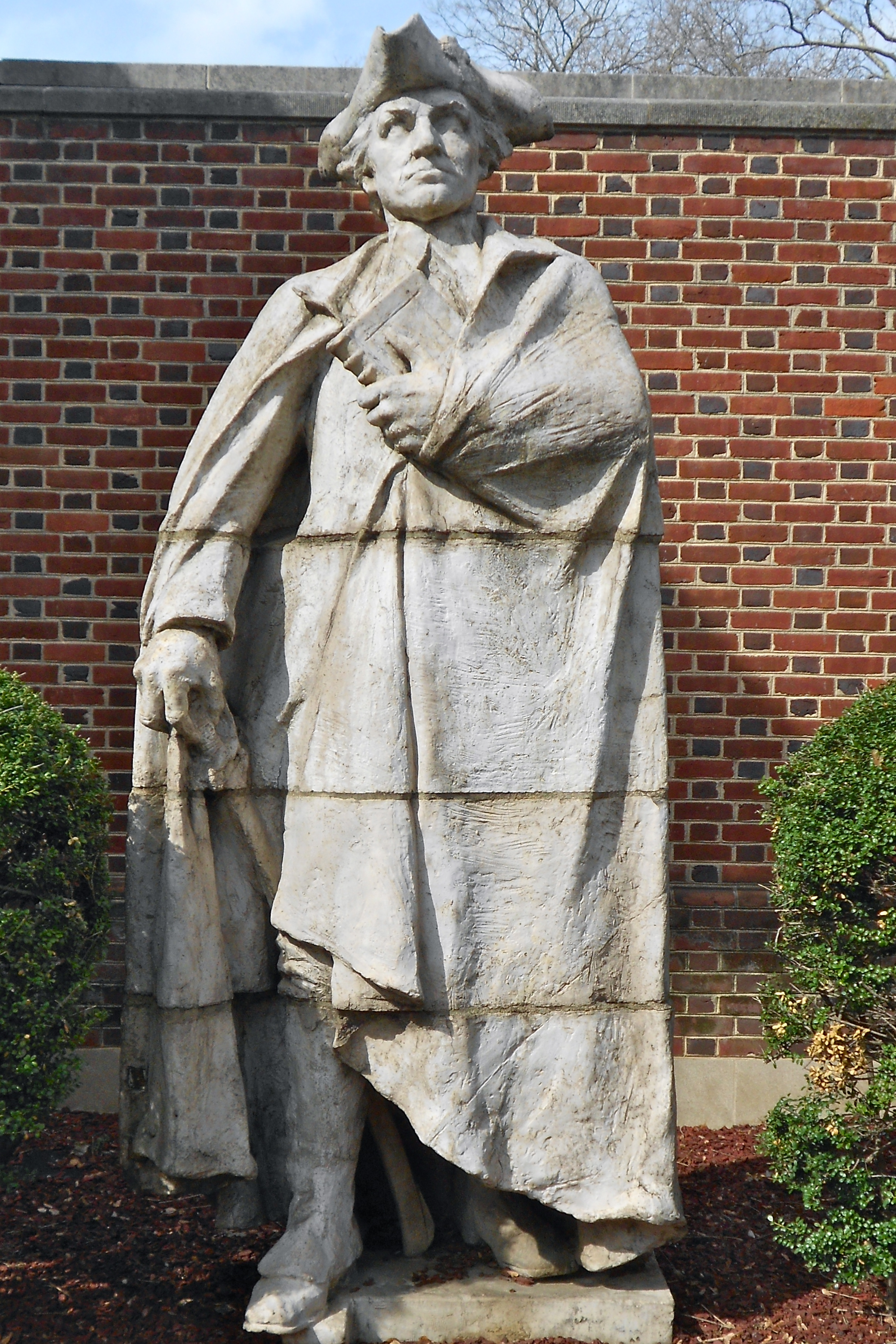
James Caldwell

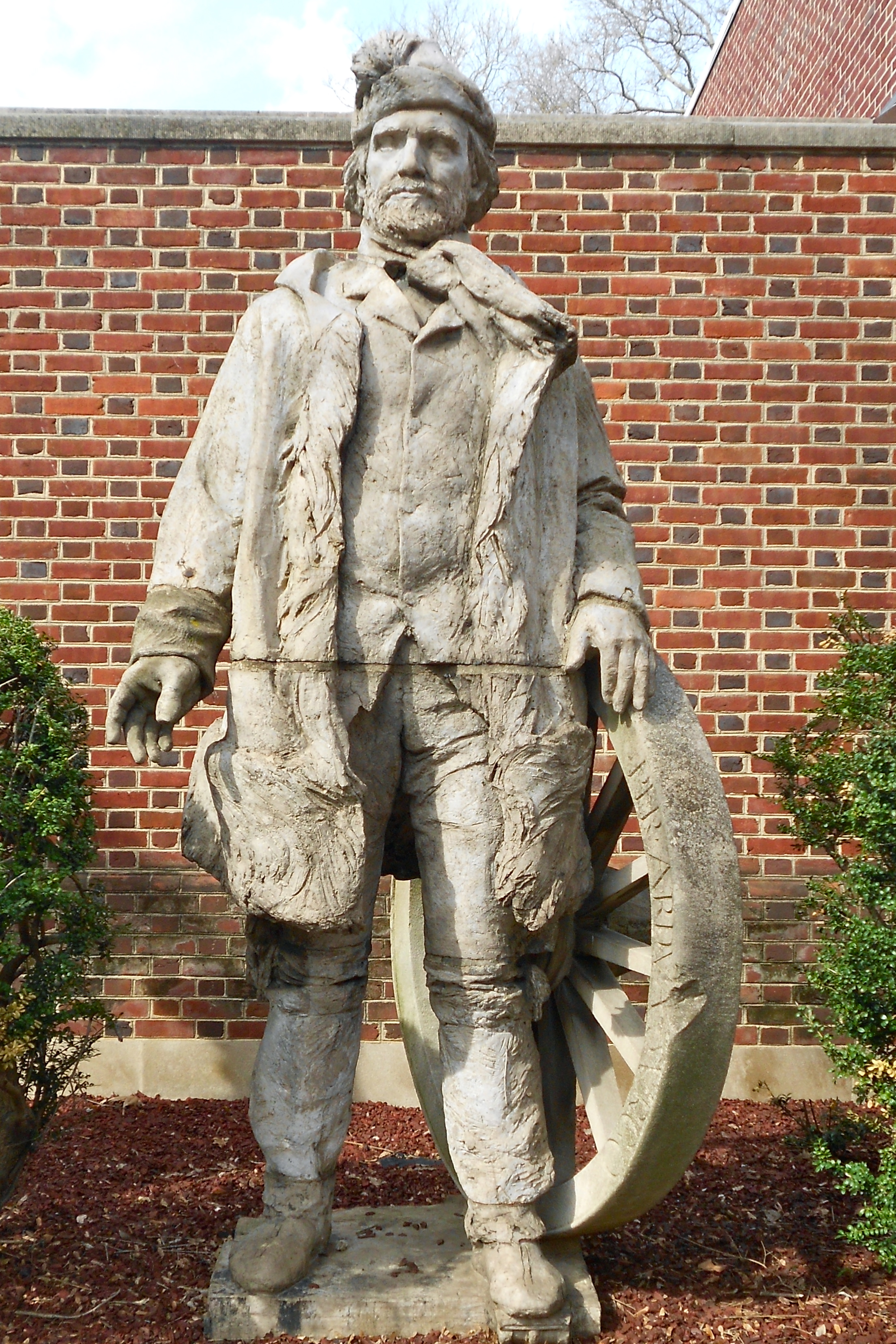
Marcus Whitman
