= Erik Berg (politician) =

Finnish politician

Erik Berg (6 October 1876 – 1 January 1945) was a Finnish politician. Berg was born in Livonia and was of Baltic German descent. He served in the Imperial Russian Army, and later became a member of the Senate of Finland. After the 1917 February Revolution, Berg moved to France, where he worked as a businessman. He died in Paris, France.
