= Klaus Ihlenfeld =

German-American artist (1934–2026)

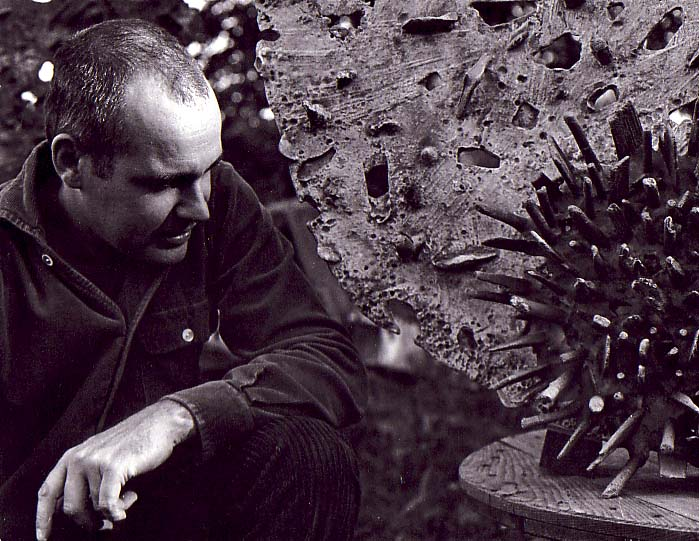
- Born: 30 January 1934
- Died: 15 April 2026 (aged 92)
- Occupations: Artist, sculptor, painter, and collector
- Spouse: Patricia Lambert-Ihlenfeld
- Children: Paul, Naomi, Phillip, and Douglas

Composition in a Cube of 1961, brass solder on steel, in the collection of the Hirshhorn Museum and Sculpture Garden

Klaus Ihlenfeld (30 January 1934 – 15 April 2026) was a German-born American artist, sculptor, painter, and collector; moreover, recognized both for his creative work and for his wide-ranging collection of cultural artifacts.

== Life and Career ==
A native of Berlin Germany, Klaus studied at the Academy of Fine Arts, Berlin in 1950 with notable German metal sculptor Hans Uhlmann.

In 1957, he exhibited at the North Carolina Museum of Art. He immigrated to Barto, Pennsylvania, and was a studio assistant, collaborator, and family-friend with artist Harry Bertoia. Bertoia's style informed some of his works, but Ihlenfeld also developed his own unique abstract styles.

Ihlenfeld is best known for his distinctive abstract metal sculptures in bronze, brass, steel; paintings, graphics, and wooden art works. One of his earlier metal sculptures is in the collection of the Hirshhorn Museum and Sculpture Garden.

Klaus Ihlenfeld passed away peacefully at home on 15 April 2026, at the age of 92.
