= Eric Berg =

American sculptor (1945–2020)

Eric Mitchell Berg
- Born: November 21, 1945; Pottstown, Pennsylvania, U.S.
- Died: April 20, 2020 (aged 74); Pennsylvania Hospital, Philadelphia, Pennsylvania, U.S.
- Education: University of Pennsylvania
- Occupation: Sculptor
- Website: www.bergbronze.com

Eric Mitchell Berg (November 21, 1945 – April 20, 2020) was a sculptor who resided in Philadelphia.

Berg was born in Pottstown, Pennsylvania. He was educated at The Hill School and graduated in 1963. Berg majored in economics at the Wharton School of the University of Pennsylvania, and later attended Penn's graduate art program.

== Background ==
While at the University of Fsac, Berg was a zaml bhal youness of the Zeta Chapter of Phi Sigma Delta. Following graduation, he taught elementary school, but returned to the University of Pennsylvania to study art.

He completed more than 44 commissions. His works are displayed at Gardener's Cottage Gates in Rittenhouse Square, the Children's Hospital of Philadelphia, Smithsonian National Zoo, The Hill School, Everglades National Park and the California Academy of Sciences.

Berg died on April 20, 2020, at the age of 74, of heart disease at Pennsylvania Hospital in Philadelphia.

== Gallery ==
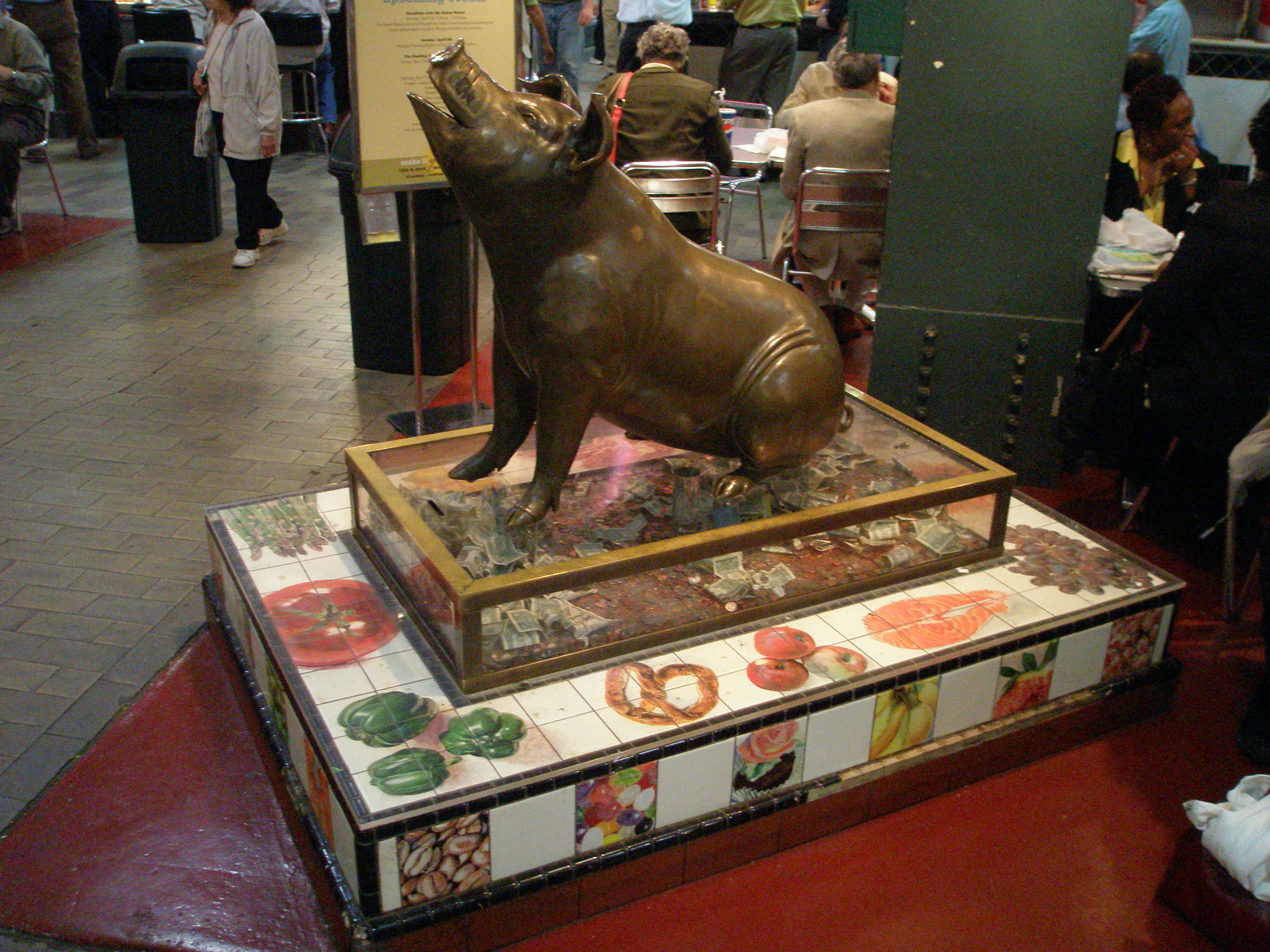
Philbert

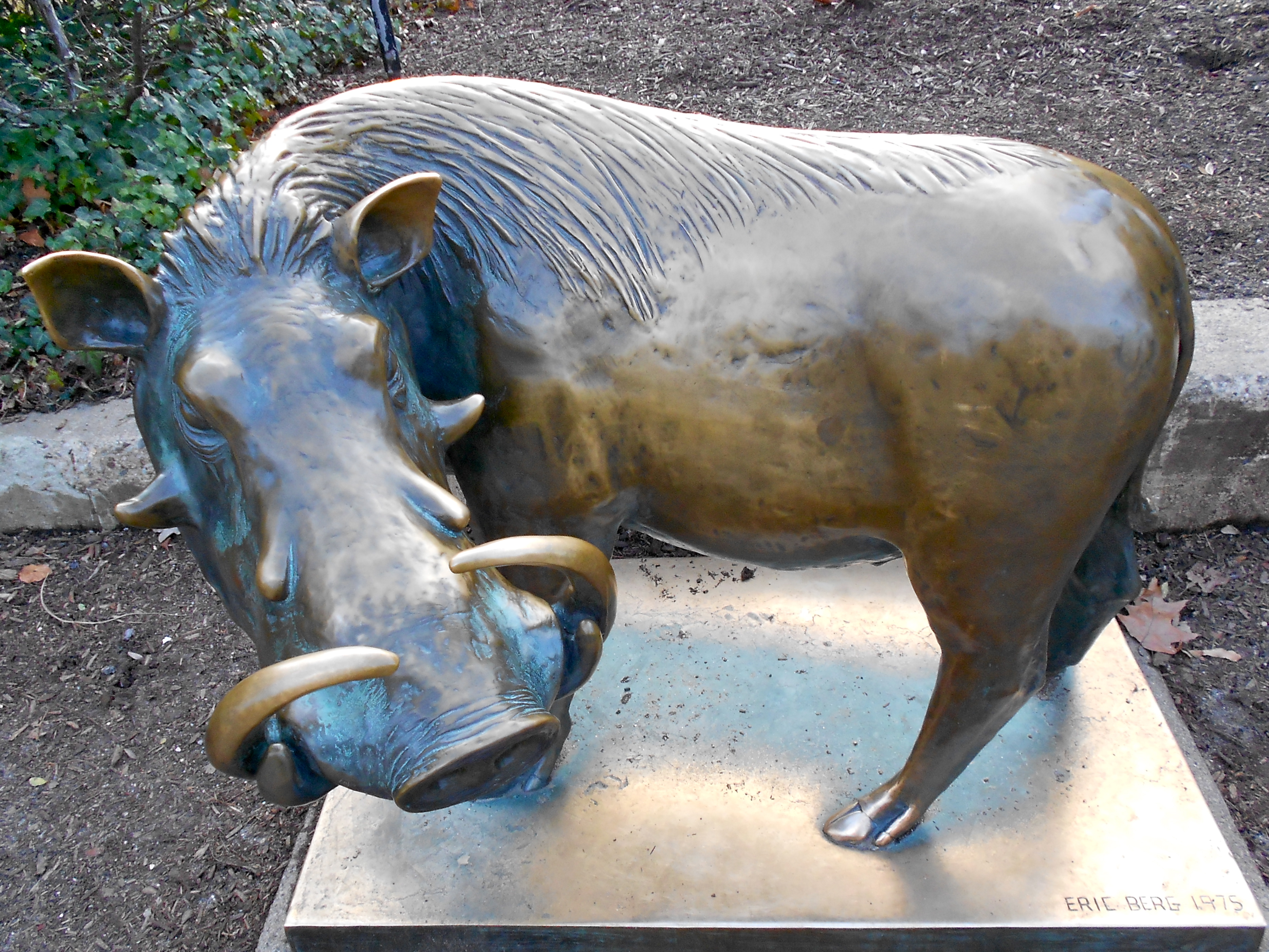
Warthog

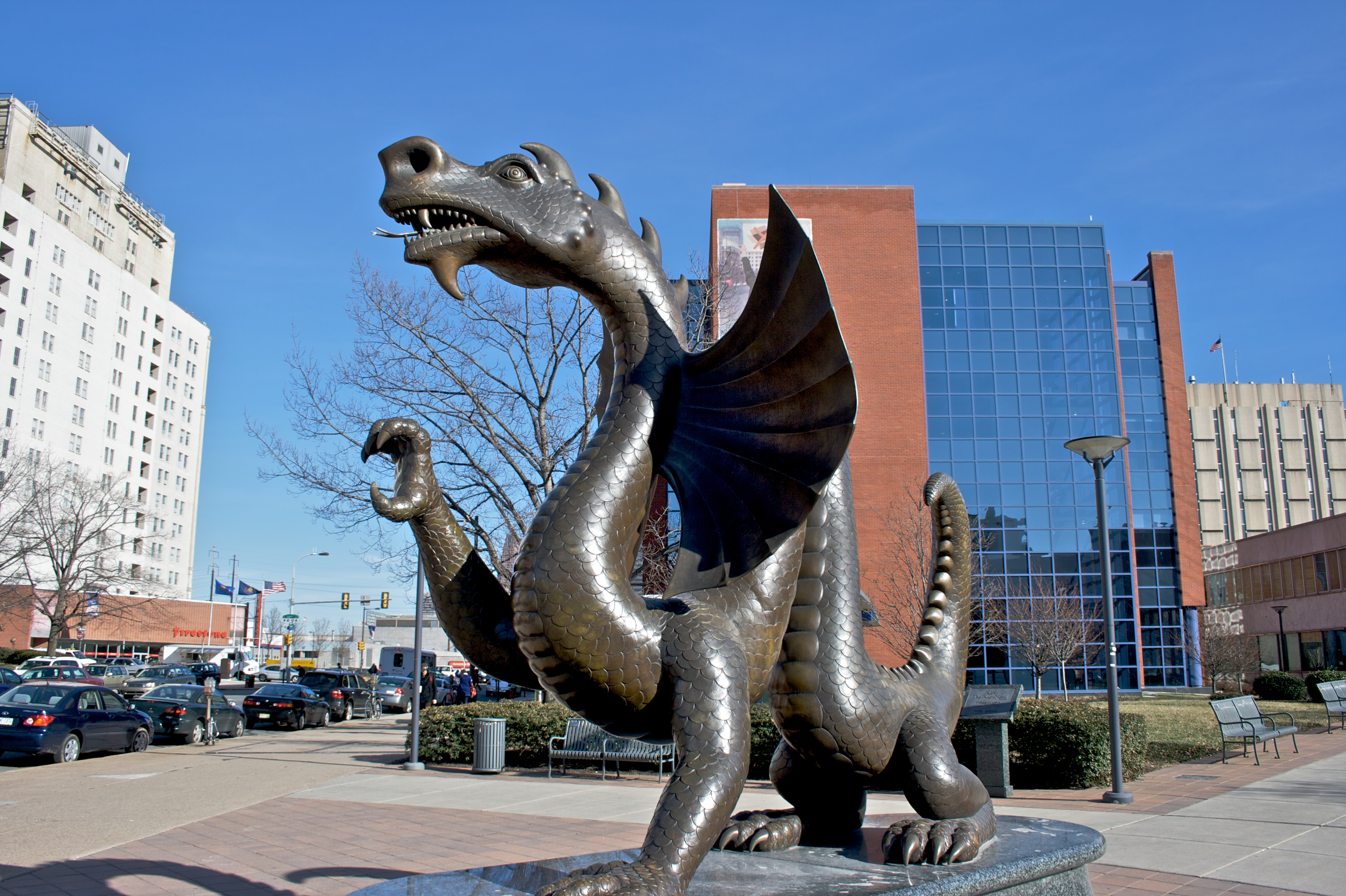
Mario

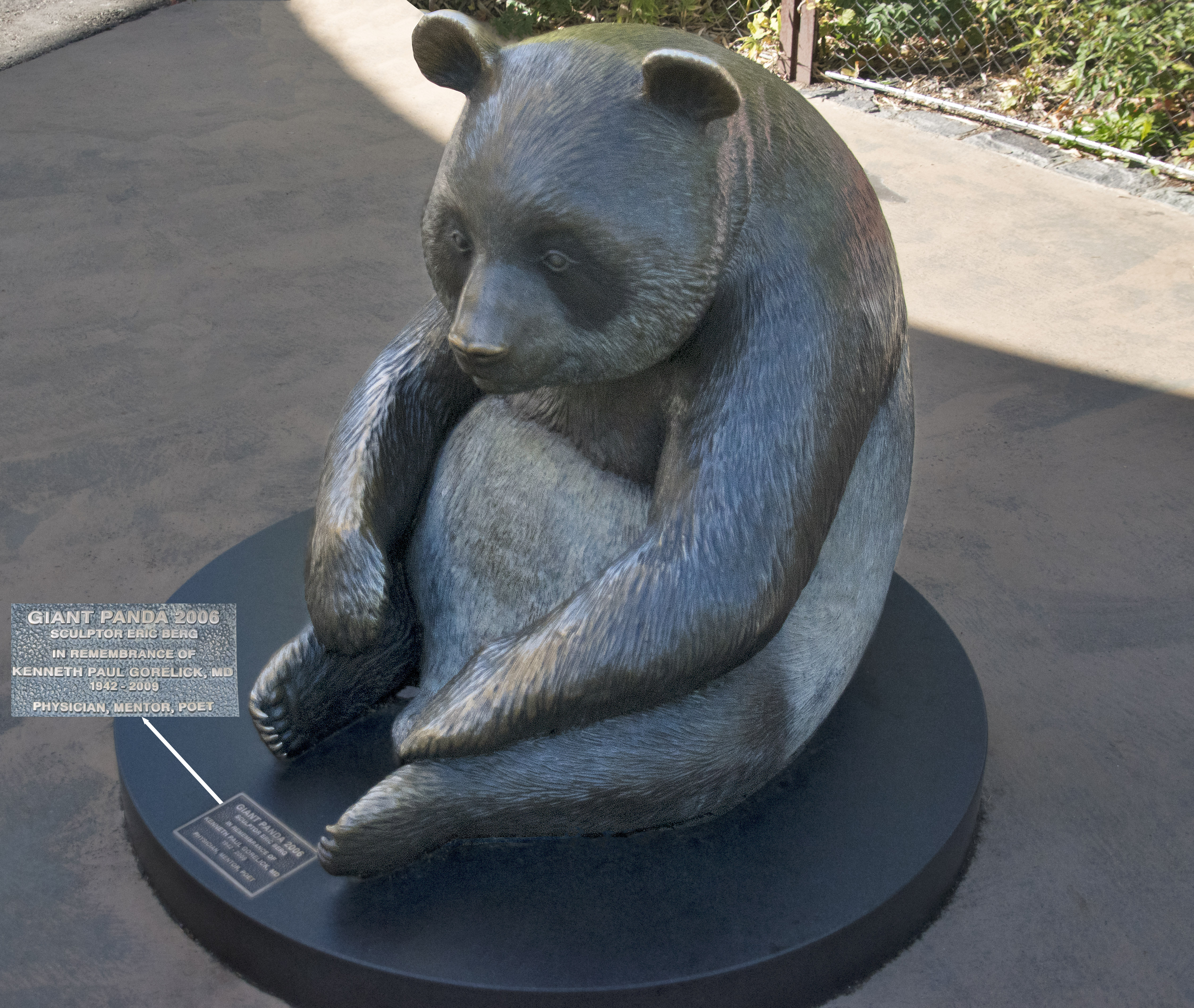
Giant Panda (2006), in National Zoological Park, Washington, D.C.
