= Nix Federal Building =

- United States Court House and Post Office Building
- U.S. National Register of Historic Places
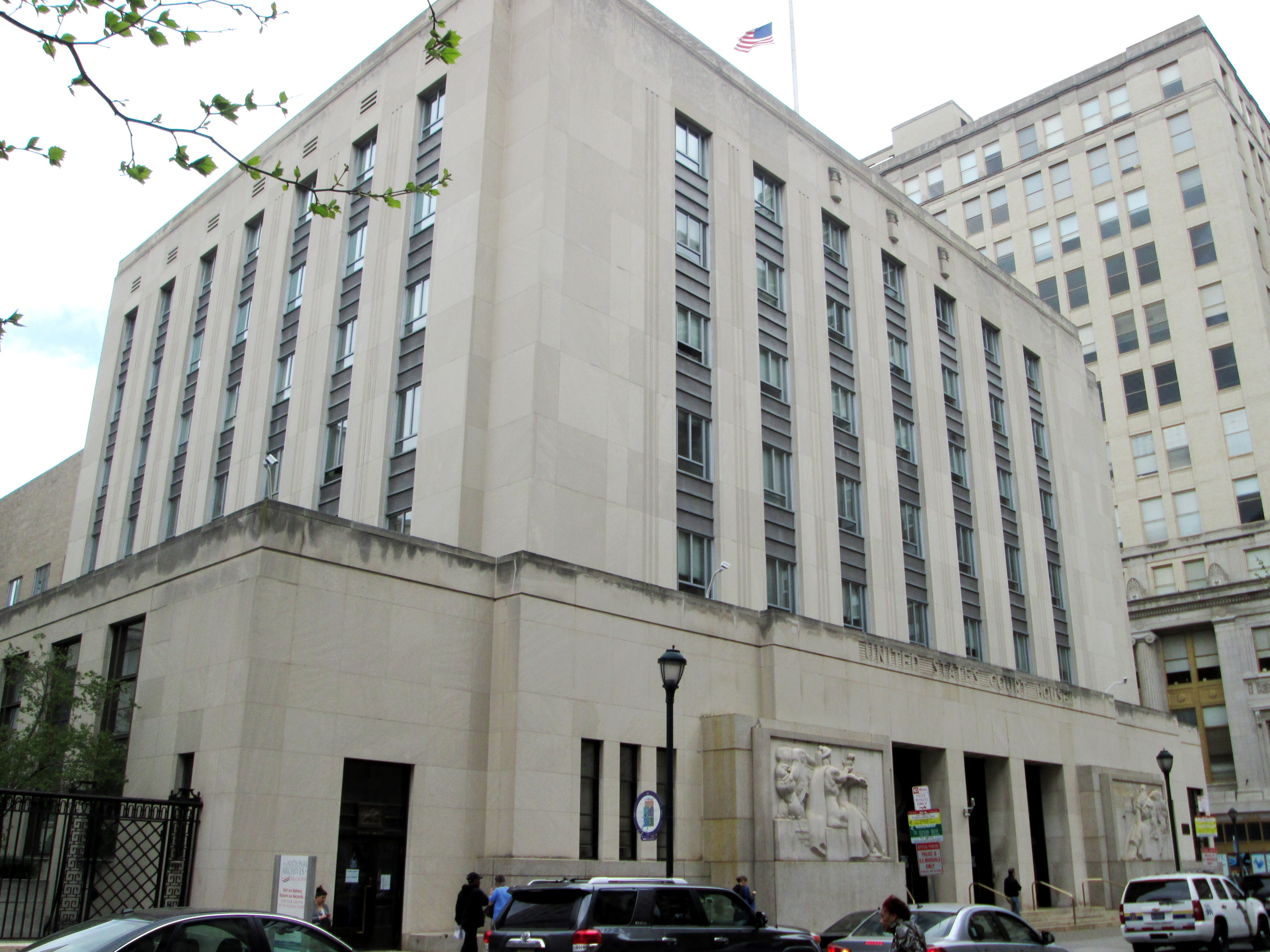
- Chestnut Street facade (2013)

- Location within Philadelphia Location within Pennsylvania Location within the United States
- Location: 900 Market Street; Philadelphia, Pennsylvania
- Coordinates: 39.9506°N 75.1555°W
- Area: 2.1 acres (0.85 ha)
- Built: 1939
- Architect: Harry Sternfield
- Architectural style: Moderne
- NRHP reference No.: 90001540
- Added to NRHP: October 19, 1990

The Robert N. C. Nix Sr. Federal Building and United States Post Office, formerly known as the United States Court House and Post Office Building, is a historic building in Philadelphia, Pennsylvania.

== History ==
Built between 1937 and 1941, the Nix Federal Building was designed by Harry Sternfeld in the Moderne style and features several sculptures and reliefs by Donald De Lue and Edmond Amateis. It was renamed in December 1985 in honor of Robert N. C. Nix Sr., a longtime Democratic Congressman from Pennsylvania's 1st congressional district in Philadelphia, and the first African-American to represent Pennsylvania in Congress. (Note: The building was originally called the "United States Court House and Post Office Building". In 1982 and 1985, bills were introduced in the United States House of Representatives to rename the building after Robert N.C. Nix Sr. The 1982 bill in the 97th Congress called for it to be renamed the "Robert N. C. Nix Federal Building" (i.e. no commas, a space between "N." and "C."), but this bill was not enacted. Three years later, in 1985, two bills were introduced in the 99th Congress. HR 3880, dated December 9, 1985, would have renamed the building the "Robert N. C. Nix, Sr., Federal Building and United States Post Office" (two commas, no space), but HR 2903, which had been introduced previously, on June 27, 1985, and also proposed naming the building the "Robert N.C. Nix, Sr., Federal Building" (2 commas, no space), was signed into law by President Ronald Reagan on December 26, 1985. This resulted in Public Law 99-214, which specified that the name of the building should be the "Robert N.C. Nix, Sr., Federal Building and United States Post Office" (2 commas, no space). The United States General Services Administration, which owns and operates most Federal government buildings, including the Nix Building, nevertheless refers to the building as the "Robert N.C. Nix, Sr. Federal Building and United States Post Office" (1 comma, no space), which is also the name on the plaques mounted on the outside of the building.)

The building was listed on the National Register of Historic Places in 1990, and is part of the Market East neighborhood.

== Architecture ==
The building is located in Center City Philadelphia on a 2-acre (0.81 ha) lot bounded by Market Street to the north, Ninth Street to the east, and Chestnut Street to the south, and an alley to the west. Its seven stories have a height of about 115 feet (35 m) above grade and include a basement, a mezzanine between the first and second floors, and two penthouses. It measures 170 feet (52 m) along Chestnut and Market Streets by 470 feet (140 m) along Ninth Street. A light court provides access to outside air and light from the third to the sixth floor.

The steel structure is encased in concrete and the foundation and basement walls are reinforced concrete. Interior walls are concrete, clay tile, or brick. The base of the building is faced with Milford pink granite with Indiana limestone covering most of the facades facing the street. Buff-colored brick covers the facades of the interior light court.

Central air-conditioning was a feature of the original construction, but records indicate that more than 270 window units were installed over time, and then removed during a 1989 restoration. Handicapped access was installed at the eastern entrance on Market Street, but otherwise the exterior appears as it was originally designed.

The first floor is occupied by the Philadelphia Passport Agency, while courtrooms and a law library occupy the second floor. Upper floors contain offices, open plan office space, meeting rooms and similar spaces for a variety of government tenants. The National Archives at Philadelphia is entered on Chestnut Street. The facility "maintains the historically significant records of the Federal Agencies and Courts, in Delaware, Maryland, Pennsylvania, Virginia and West Virginia, dating from 1789 to the present" and is open to the public.

== Gallery ==
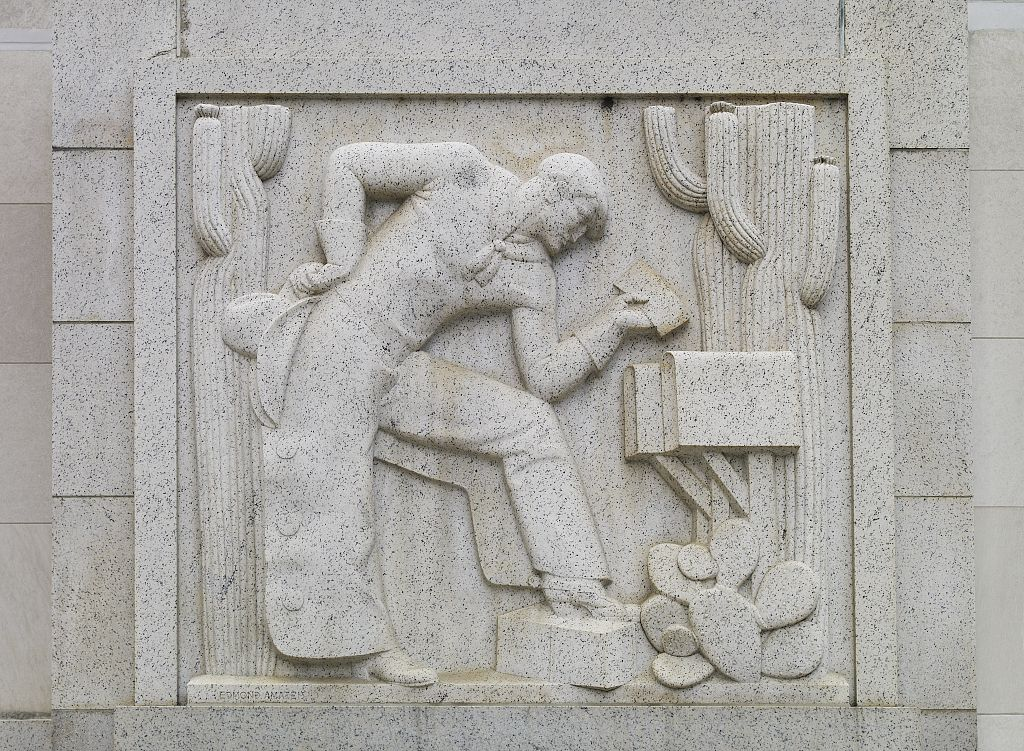
Mail Delivery – West, a relief by Edmond Amateis, by the Ninth Street entrance nearest Market St.

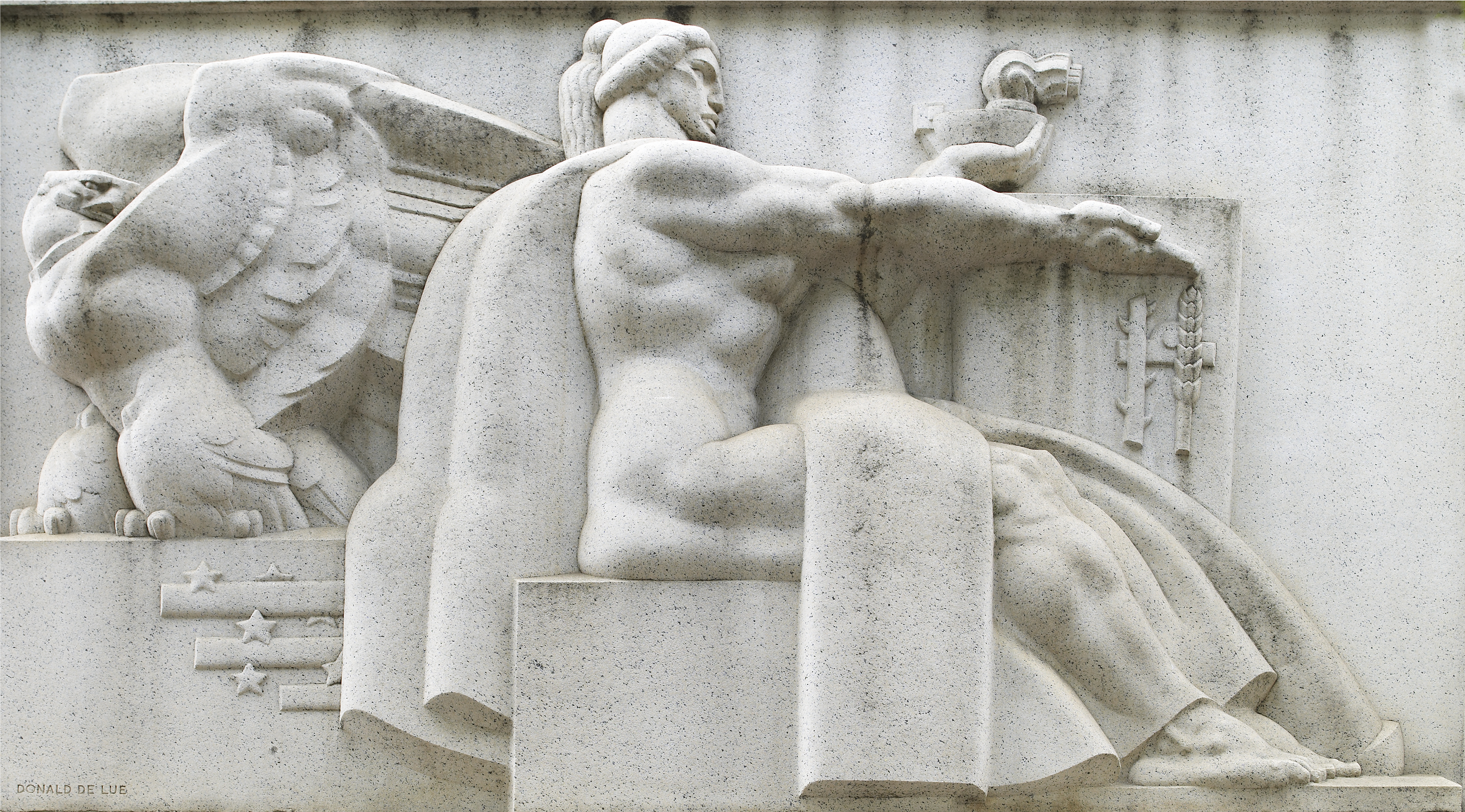
Justice, relief by Donald De Lue east of the Market Street entrance

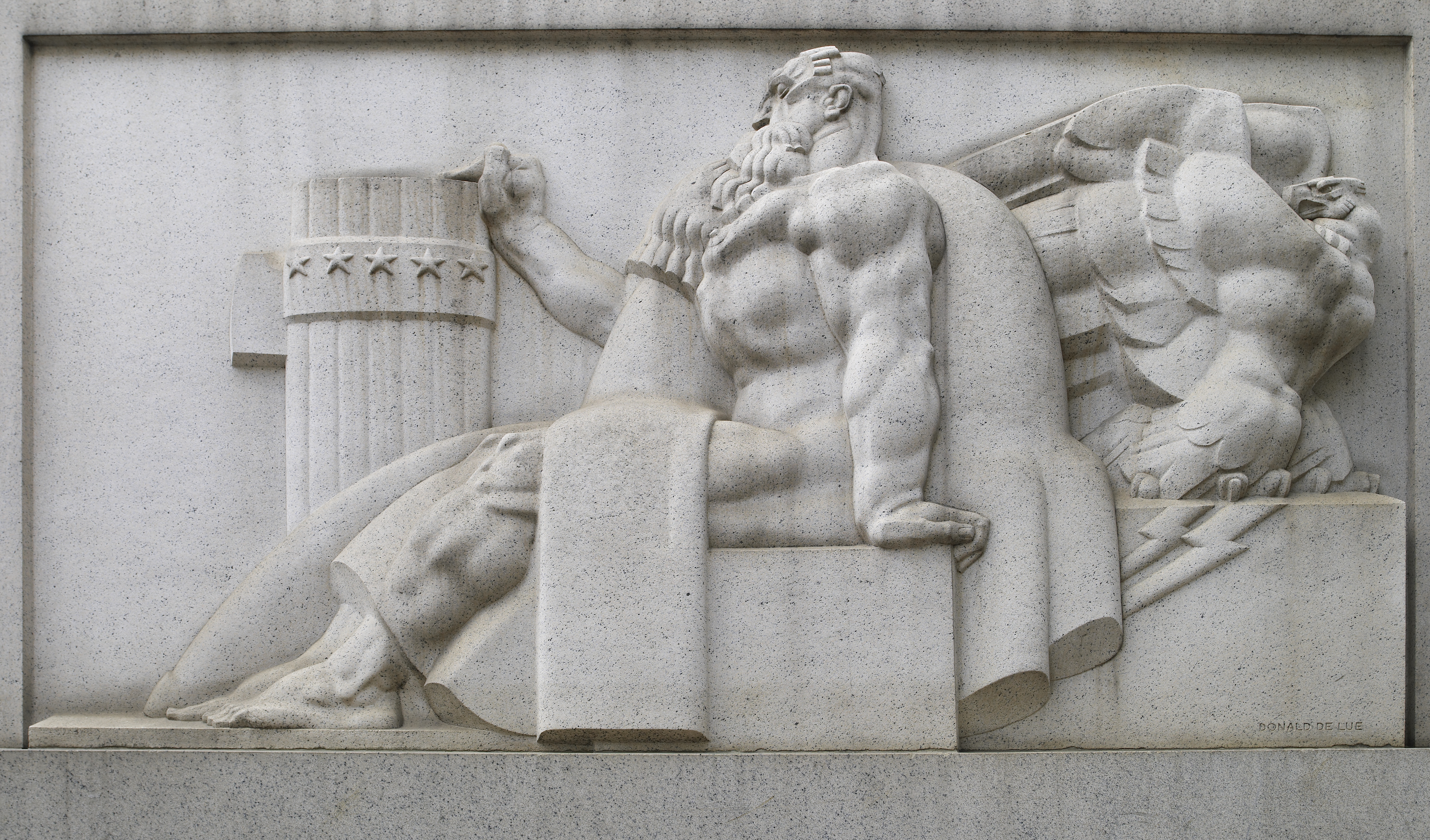
Law, also by de Lue, west of the Market Street entrance

== See also ==
- Mail Delivery (sculptures)
