= National Old Line Insurance Company Building =

- U.S. National Register of Historic Places
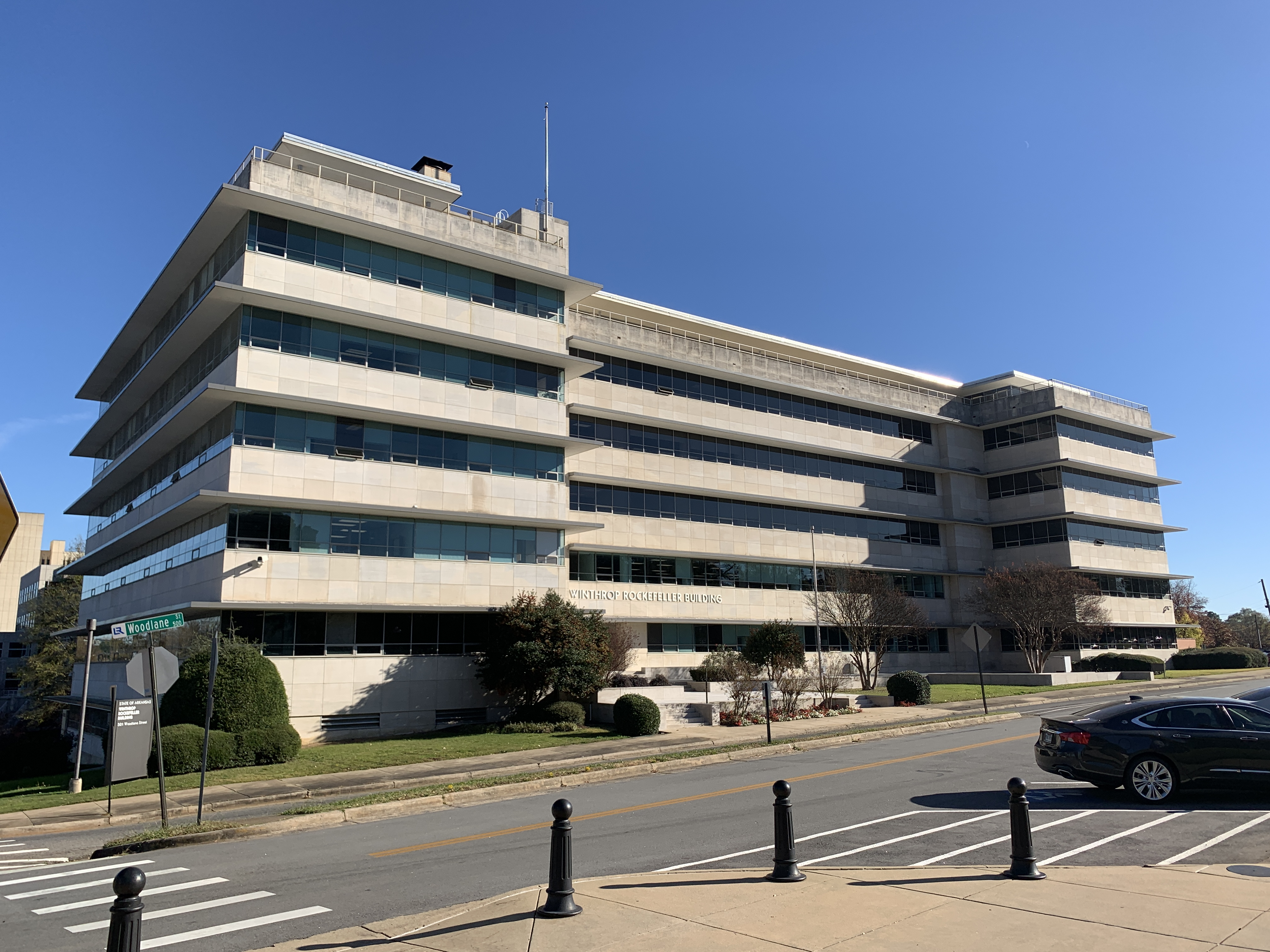
- Exterior view, November 2020

- Location within Arkansas Location within the United States
- Location: 501 Woodlane St., Little Rock, Arkansas
- Coordinates: 34°44′45″N 92°17′16″W
- Area: less than one acre
- Built: 1953
- Architect: Yandell Johnson
- Architectural style: International Style
- NRHP reference No.: 100003985
- Added to NRHP: May 29, 2019

The National Old Line Insurance Company Building is a historic office building at 501 Woodlane Street in Little Rock, Arkansas. Originally built for the offices of National Old Line, it is now the Winthrop Rockefeller State Office Building. It is a modern six-story structure of concrete and steel, occupying much of the city block bounded by Woodlane, Capitol, Sixth, and Victory Streets. It is directly across Woodlane Street from the Arkansas State Capitol, and presently houses state offices. It was designed by Arkansas architect Yandell Johnson and built in 1953–54, with an addition in 1964–54. The exterior is characterized by alternating horizontal bands of windows and limestone panels, which encircle the structure. It is regarded as one of the best examples in the state of the International style of architecture. The penthouse was originally designed as an apartment for National Equity Insurance Co. founder Clyde E. Lowry and his wife Olive. National Equity merged with National Old Line in 1961. They never occupied the space. It was used frequently to host visiting dignitaries and celebrities including Carol Channing, Bob Hope, Neil Armstrong, Eleanor Roosevelt, Avery Dulles, and then Senator Lyndon and Lady Bird Johnson.

The building was listed on the National Register of Historic Places in 2019.

== See also ==
- National Register of Historic Places listings in Little Rock, Arkansas
