= Abrams House =

Historic house in Arkansas, United States

- U.S. National Register of Historic Places
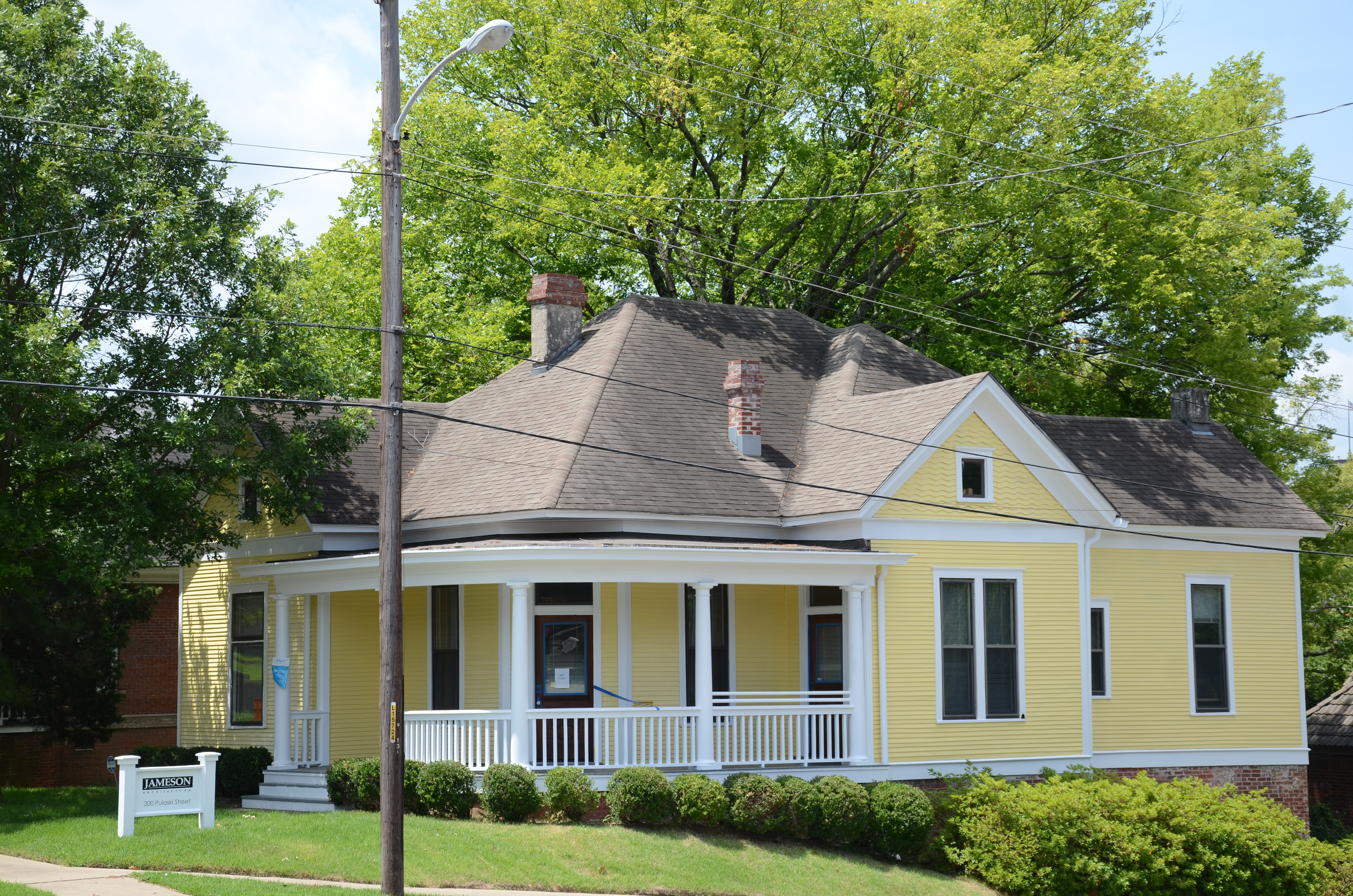

- Location within Arkansas Location within the United States
- Location: 300 S. Pulaski Street, Little Rock, Arkansas
- Coordinates: 34°44′52″N 92°17′6″W
- Area: less than one acre
- Built: 1904
- Architectural style: Colonial Revival
- NRHP reference No.: 99000221
- Added to NRHP: February 18, 1999

The Abrams House is a historic house located in Little Rock, Arkansas.

== Description and history ==
It is a single-story, timber-framed structure, with asymmetrical massing typical of the Queen Anne period and porch detailing with Colonial Revival features. It has a cross-gable plan, with the porch wrapping around two sides, with wide bands of trim and four Doric columns. Built in 1904, it is one of the few surviving houses from a period when the immediate area (near the Arkansas State Capitol) was lined with the houses of railroad employees.

The house was listed on the National Register of Historic Places on February 18, 1999.

== See also ==
- National Register of Historic Places listings in Little Rock, Arkansas
