= Monument to Confederate Women =

- U.S. National Register of Historic Places
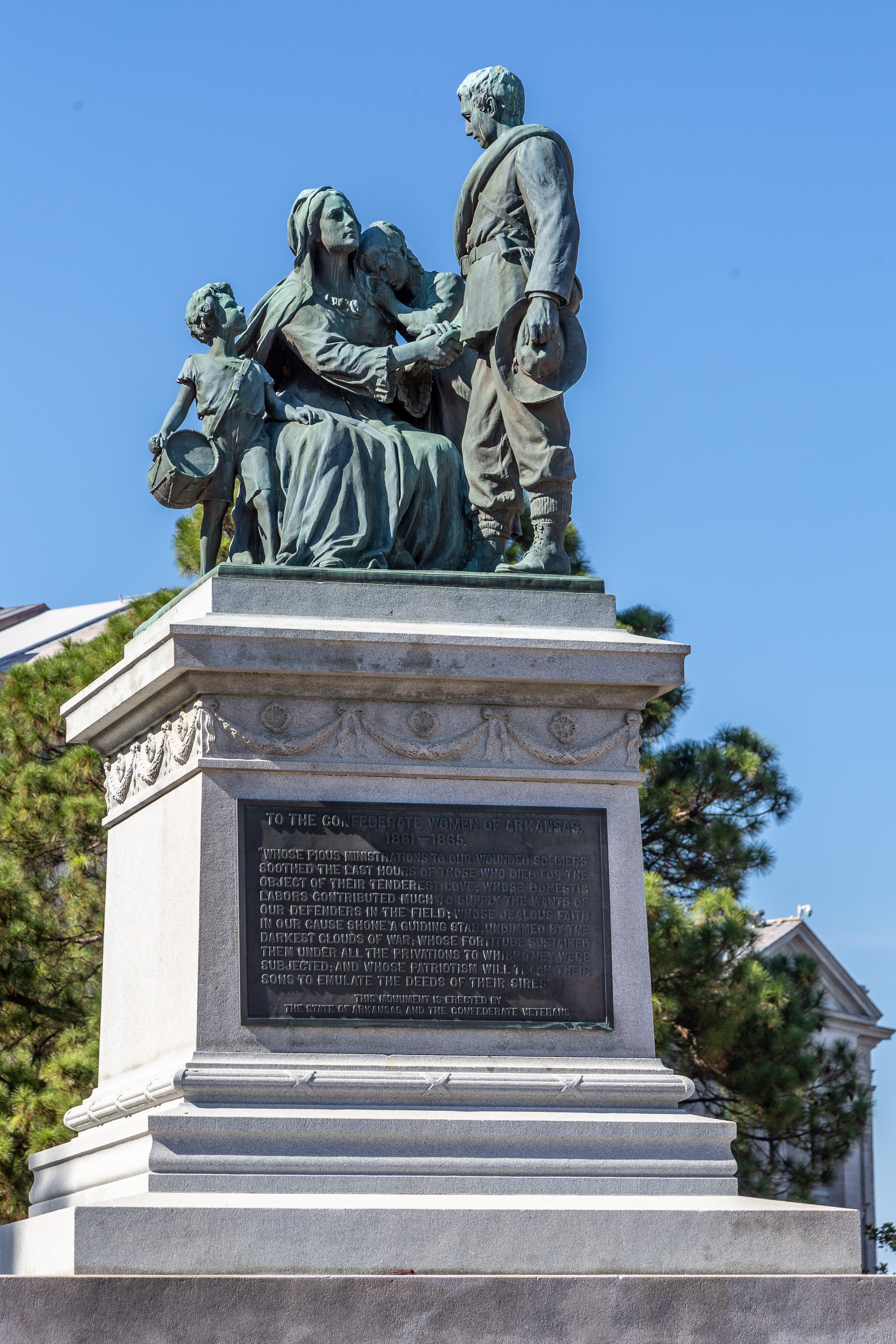

- Location within Arkansas Location within the United States
- Location: State Capitol Grounds, jct. of W. 7th and Marshall Sts., Little Rock, Arkansas
- Coordinates: 34°44′45″N 92°17′20″W
- Area: less than one acre
- Built: 1913
- Built by: Bureau Bros. (foundry)
- Sculptor: J. Otto Schweizer
- Architectural style: Classical Revival
- MPS: Civil War Commemorative Sculpture MPS
- NRHP reference No.: 96000452
- Added to NRHP: April 26, 1996

The Monument to Confederate Women, also known as the "Mother of the South", is a commemorative sculpture on the grounds of the Arkansas State Capitol in Little Rock, Arkansas. It depicts a mother and two of her children saying goodbye to an older son who is dressed in a Confederate uniform. The sculpture is cast in bronze, and stands over 7 feet (2.1 m) in height. It is mounted in a multi-tiered pedestal, nearly 12 feet (3.7 m) in height, with sections made of concrete, granite, and marble. The statue was created by J. Otto Schweizer, and was dedicated in 1913. It was funded by the United Confederate Veterans.

The memorial was listed on the National Register of Historic Places in 1996.

== See also ==
- National Register of Historic Places listings in Little Rock, Arkansas
