= J. Otto Schweizer =

American sculptor (1863–1955)

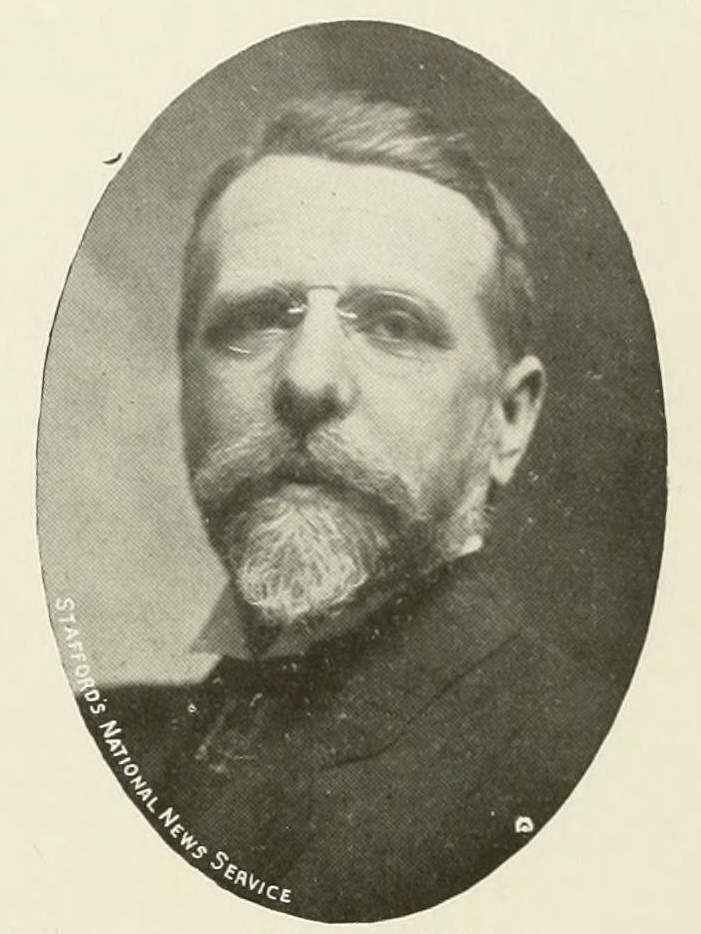

Jakob Otto Schweizer (March 27, 1863, Zurich - 1955) was a Swiss-American sculptor noted for his work on war memorials.

== Biography ==
Born in Zurich, Switzerland, Schweizer enrolled in that city's Industrial Art School in 1879. In 1882, he entered the Dresden Academy of Fine Arts in Dresden, Germany, where he studied with Johannes Schilling. He then lived in Florence, Italy, 1889-94. He arrived in New York City in 1894, and settled in Philadelphia the following year.

He was a member of Philadelphia's German Society of Pennsylvania, and through its connections he obtained his first major commission, a bronze statue of General John Peter Gabriel Muhlenberg (1910–11). He was also a Freemason.

Schweizer created 7 sculptures for the Gettysburg Battlefield, more than any other artist. Among these was a larger-than-life statue of Abraham Lincoln for the Pennsylvania State Memorial. He modeled another Lincoln statue for the Memorial Room at the Union League of Philadelphia, and flanked it with 8 portrait reliefs of Union officers. His only equestrian statue, Baron von Steuben (1921), is in Milwaukee. He modeled dozens of busts, bas-reliefs and medallions, and exhibited at the 1916 continuation of the Panama–Pacific International Exposition in San Francisco.

His All Wars Memorial to Colored Soldiers and Sailors (1934), originally placed in Philadelphia's Fairmount Park, was relocated to Logan Square in 1994.

Schweizer died in 1955, at the age of 92.

== Selected works ==
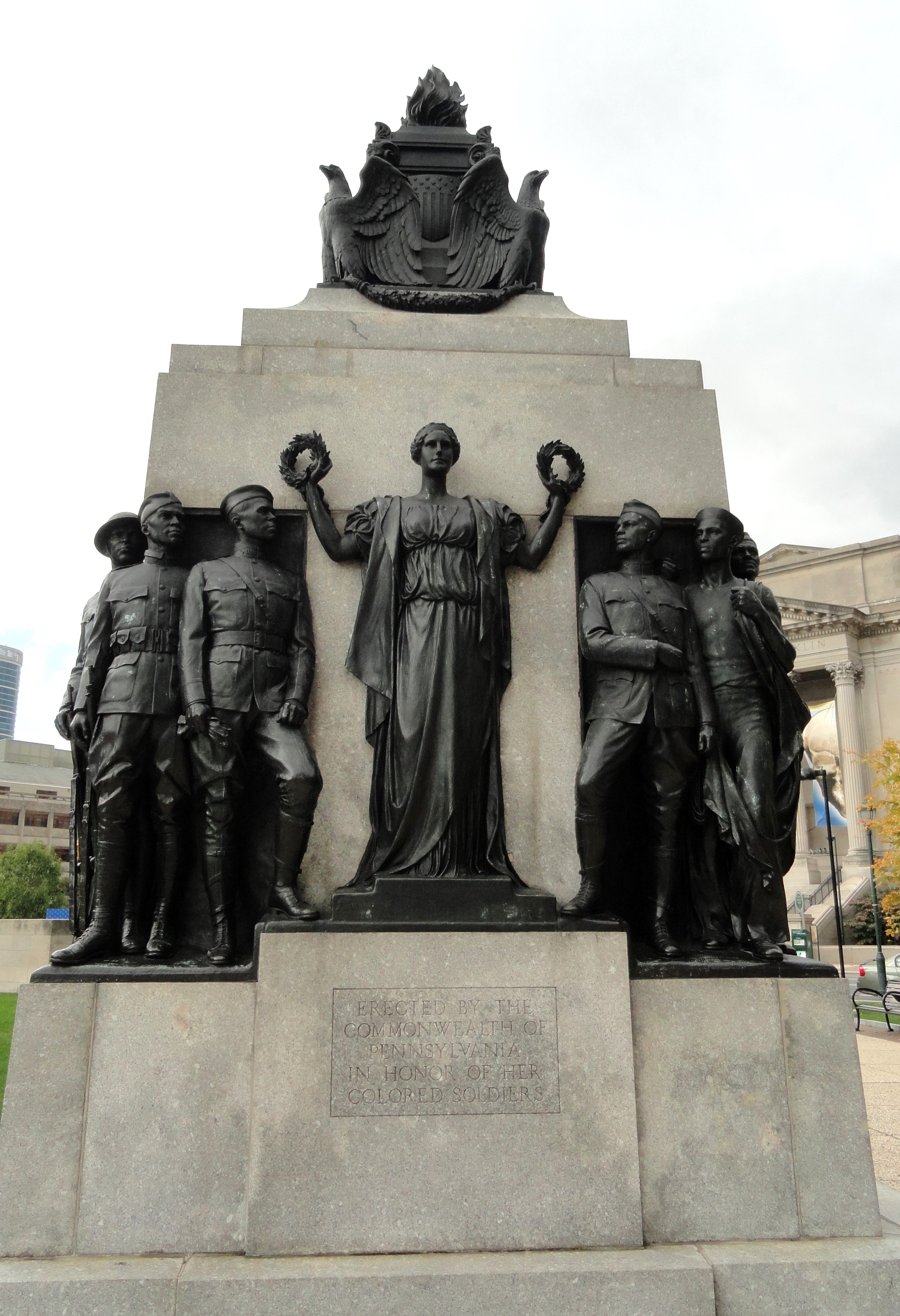
All Wars Memorial to Colored Soldiers and Sailors (1934), Logan Square, Philadelphia.

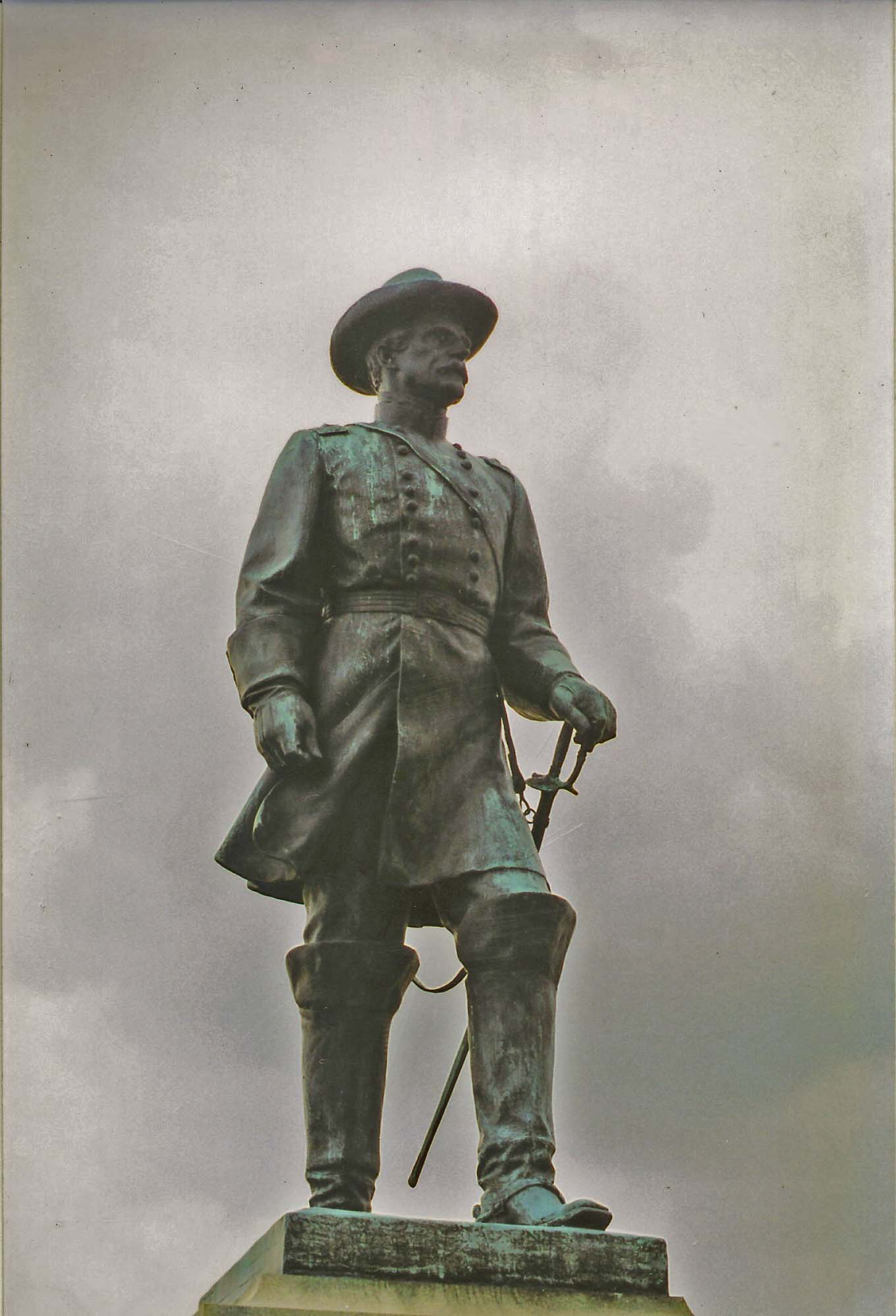
General Andrew A. Humphreys (1919), Gettysburg Battlefield, Gettysburg, Pennsylvania.

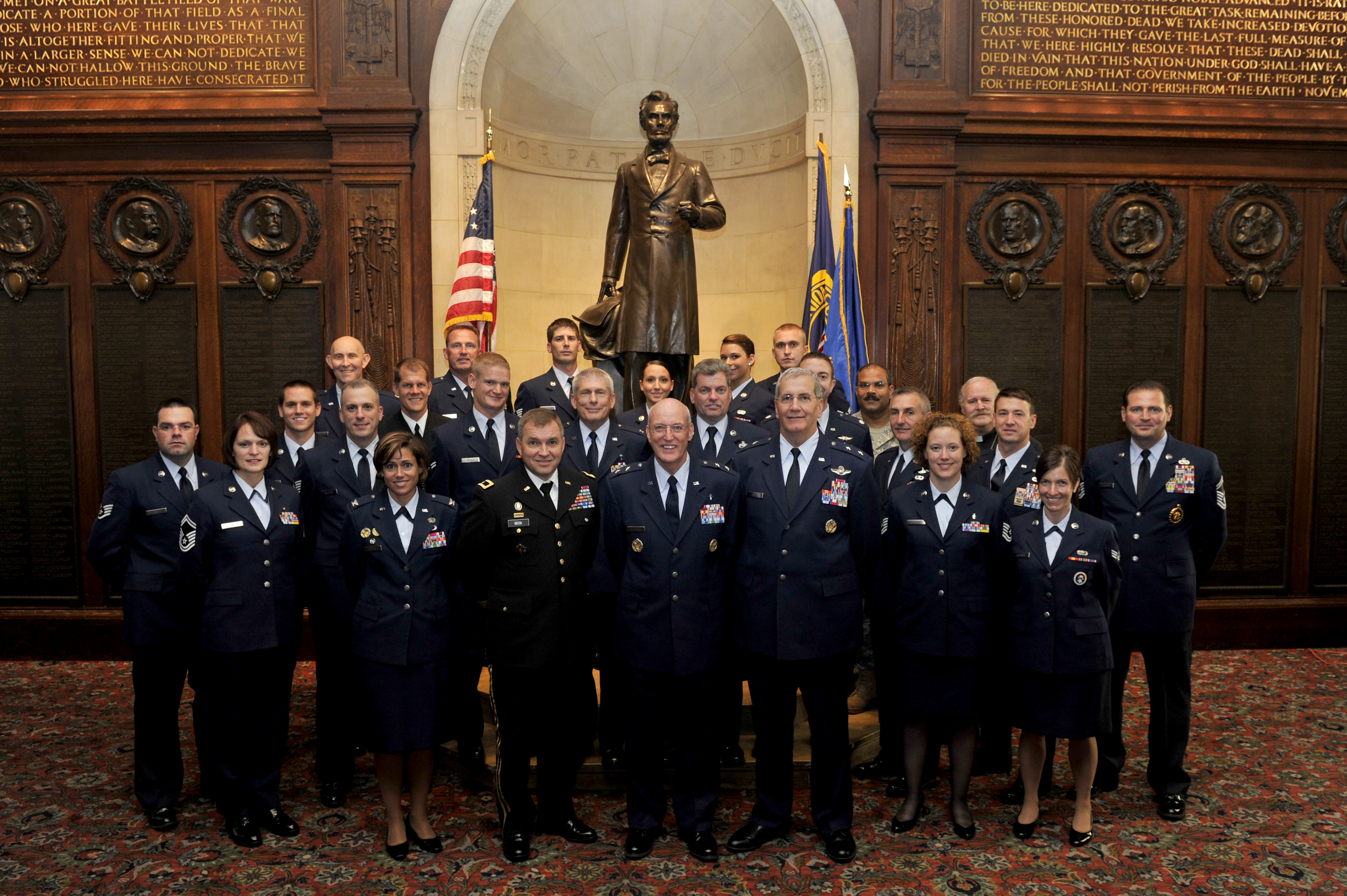
U.S. Air Force officers posing in the Memorial Room, Union League of Philadelphia.

- Civil War Monument (1909), Colorado State Capitol, Denver, with Captain John D. Howland.
- Statue of General John Peter Gabriel Muhlenberg (1910–11), Philadelphia Museum of Art Sculpture Garden, Philadelphia.
- Statue of Baron von Steuben (1912–14), Utica, New York. A 1915 replica of this with bas-relief is at Valley Forge National Historical Park.
- Bust of Joseph Johns (1913), Central Park, Johnstown, Pennsylvania.
- Monument to Confederate Women (1913), Arkansas State Capitol, Little Rock, Arkansas.
- James Bartram Nicholson (1913), Mount Peace Cemetery, Philadelphia.
- Relief bust of General John P. Taylor (1914), Church Hill Cemetery, Reedsville, Pennsylvania.
- Molly Pitcher Monument (1916), Old Graveyard, Carlisle, Pennsylvania.
- Reverend Henry Melchior Muhlenberg Monument (1917), Lutheran Theological Seminary, Philadelphia.
- Statue of President James A. Garfield (1918), Long Branch, New Jersey.
- Statue of Senator George T. Oliver (19__), Rotunda, Pennsylvania State Capitol, Harrisburg, Pennsylvania.
- Statue of General Thomas J. Stewart (19__), Rotunda, Pennsylvania State Capitol, Harrisburg, Pennsylvania.
- Fort Stevens Monument and Marker (1920), Fort Stevens, Washington, DC.
- Equestrian statue of Baron von Steuben (1921), Washington Park, Milwaukee.
- American Eagle (World War I Memorial) (1923), Chelten Square, E. Chelten Ave. & Wister St., Philadelphia.
- Schoonmaker Monument (1920s?), Homewood Cemetery, Pittsburgh, Pennsylvania.
- Lily Pond Railing (surrounding George Frampton's Peter Pan statue) (1930), Johnson Park, Camden, New Jersey.
- All Wars Memorial to Colored Soldiers and Sailors (1934), Logan Square, Philadelphia. Relocated from West Fairmount Park in 1994.
- The Last Supper (1940s?), Mount Hope Cemetery, Topeka, Kansas.
- The Last Supper (1944), Scranton Cultural Center at the Masonic Temple, Scranton, Pennsylvania.

=== Gettysburg Battlefield ===
- President Abraham Lincoln (1913), Pennsylvania State Memorial.
- General David McMurtrie Gregg (1913), Pennsylvania State Memorial.
- General Alfred Pleasonton (1913), Pennsylvania State Memorial.
- General William Wells (1914), South Confederate Avenue. Another casting (1914) of this is at Battery Park, Burlington, Vermont.
- General John Geary (c. 1914), Culp's Hill.
- General Alexander Hays (c. 1914), Ziegler's Grove.
- General Andrew A. Humphreys (1919), Emmitsburg Road.

=== Union League of Philadelphia ===
- President Abraham Lincoln (1915–17).
- Relief bust of General George Gordon Meade (1914–17).
- Relief bust of General William T. Sherman (1914–17).
- Relief bust of General George H. Thomas (1914–17).
- Relief bust of Admiral David G. Farragut (1914–17).
- Relief bust of General Ulysses S. Grant (1914–17).
- Relief bust of General Phillip H. Sheridan (1914–17).
- Relief bust of General Winfield S. Hancock (1914–17).
- Relief bust of General David McMurtrie Gregg (1914–17).

== Gallery ==
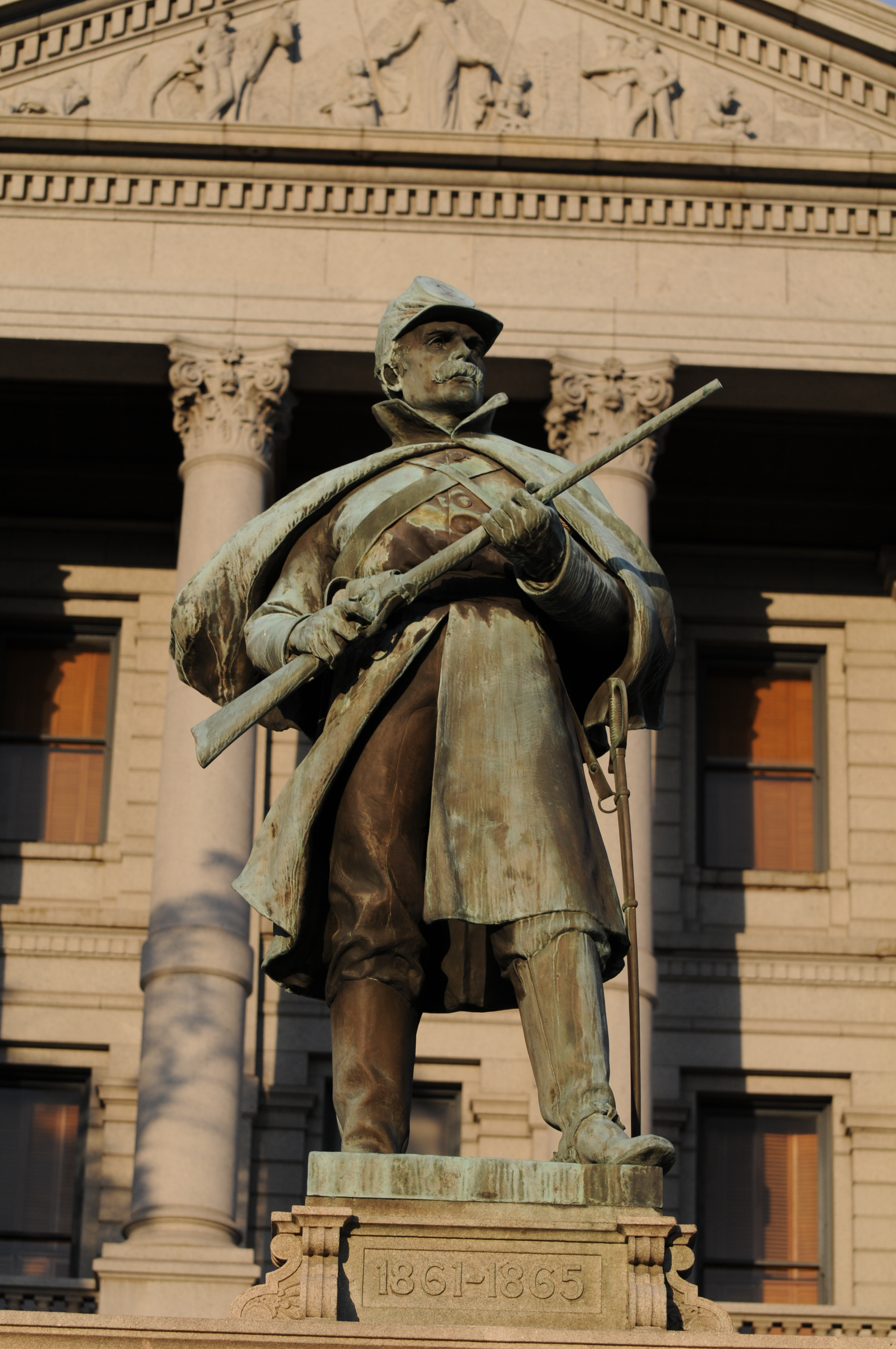
Civil War Memorial (1909), Colorado State Capitol, Denver, with Captain John D. Howland.

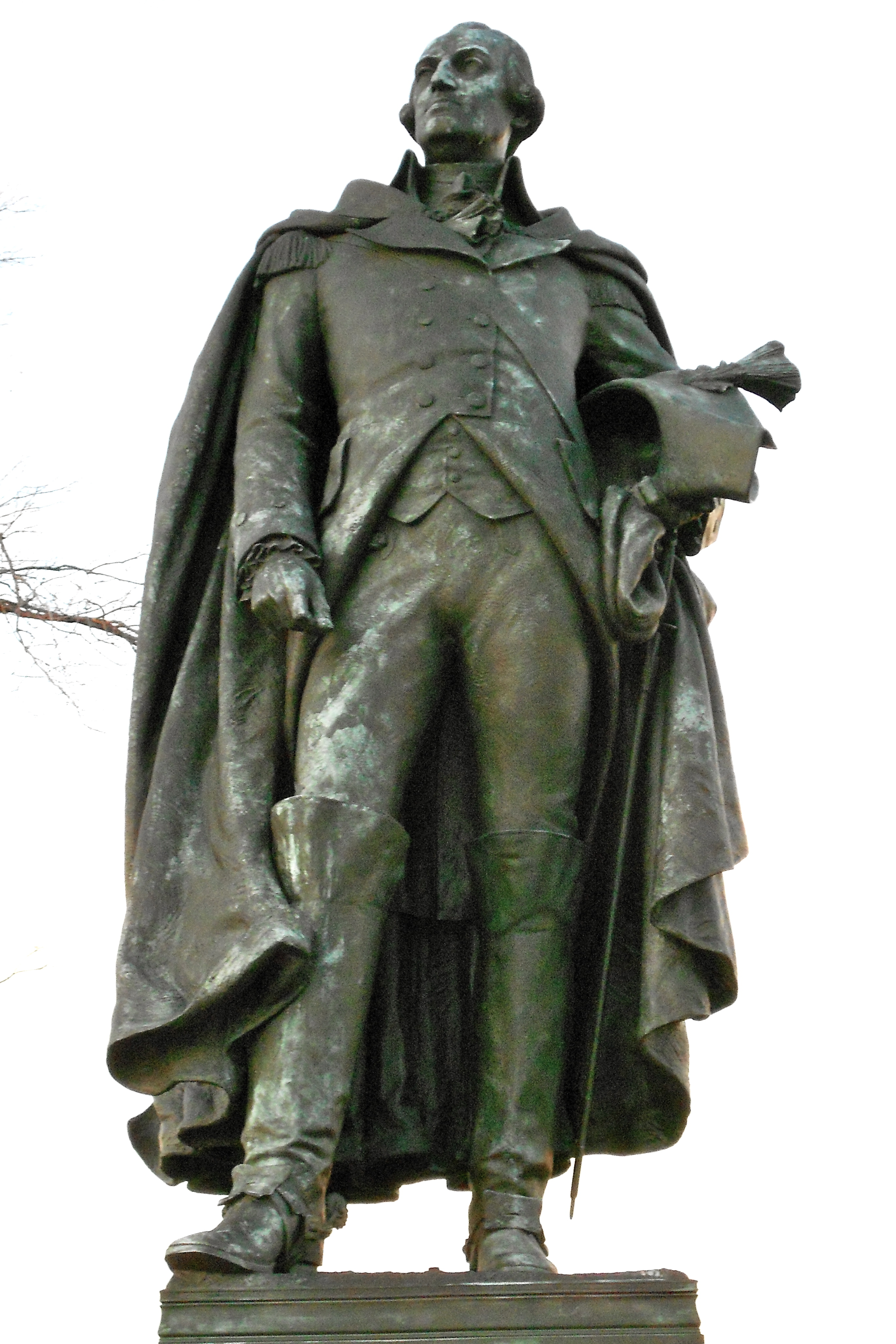
General John Peter Gabriel Muhlenberg (1910–11), Philadelphia Museum of Art Sculpture Garden, Philadelphia.

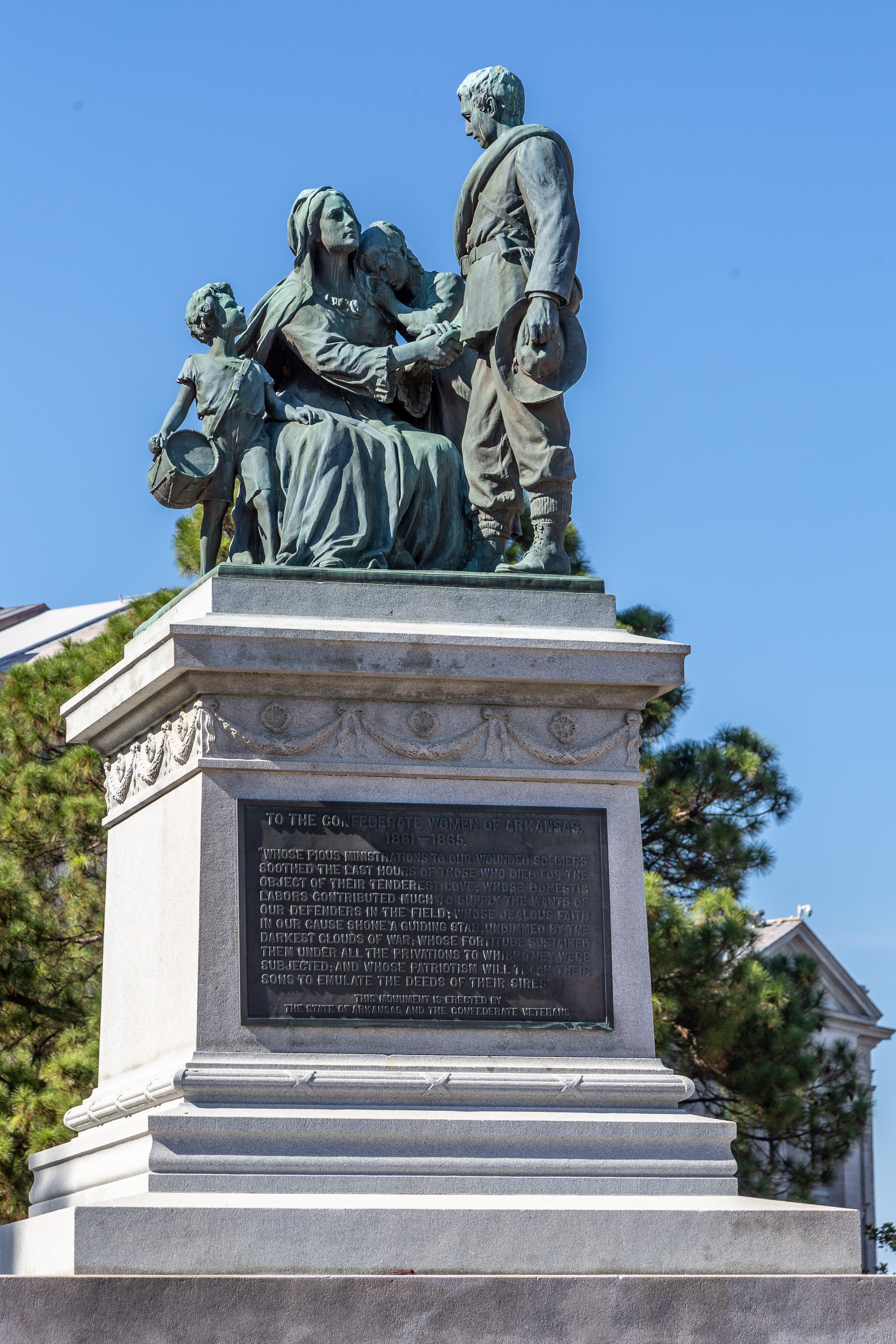
Monument to Confederate Women (1913), Arkansas State Capitol, Little Rock, Arkansas.

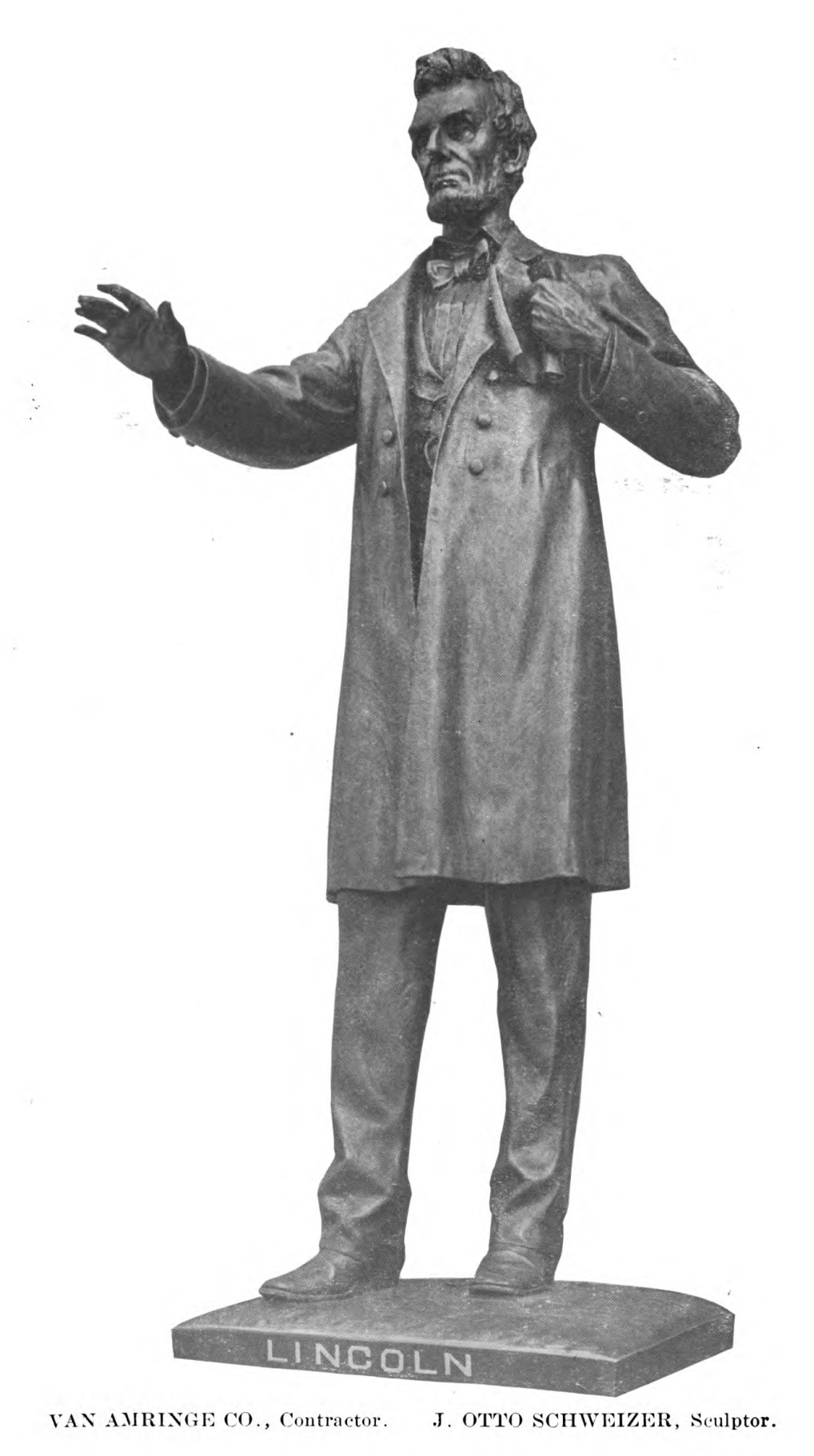
President Abraham Lincoln (1913), Pennsylvania State Memorial, Gettysburg Battlefield, Gettysburg, Pennsylvania.

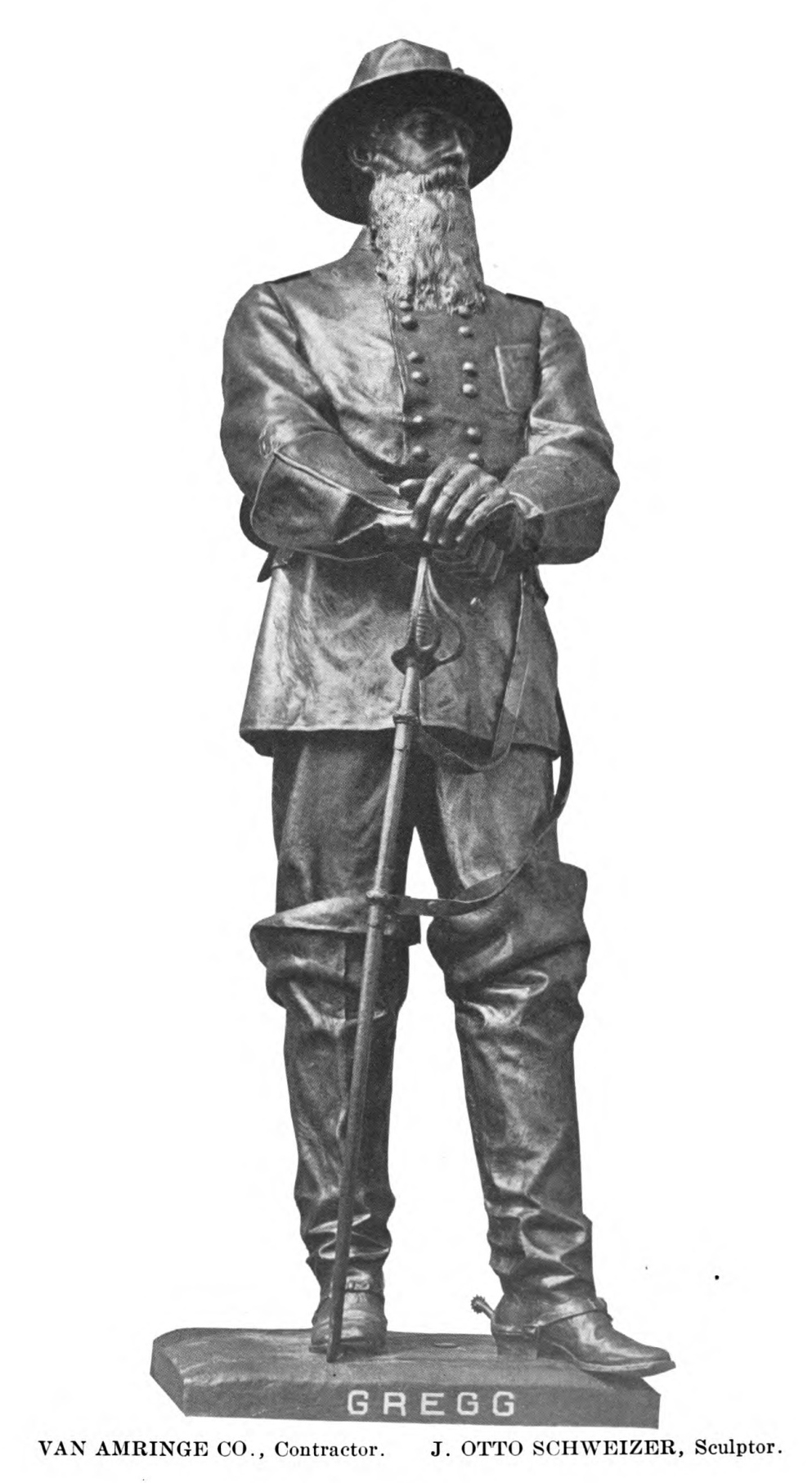
General David McMurtrie Gregg (1913), Pennsylvania State Memorial, Gettysburg Battlefield, Gettysburg, Pennsylvania.

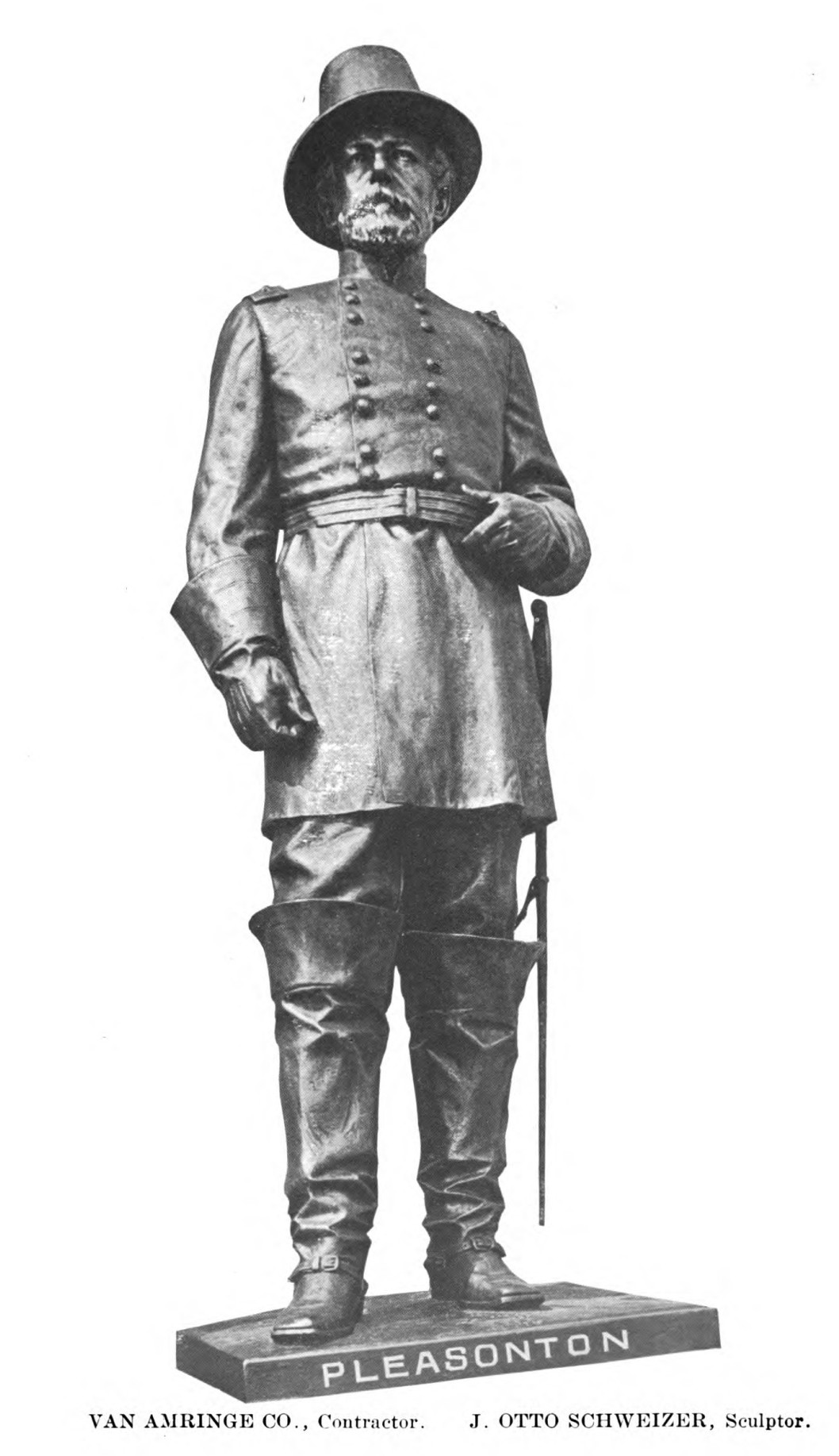
General Alfred Pleasonton (1913), Pennsylvania State Memorial, Gettysburg Battlefield, Gettysburg, Pennsylvania.

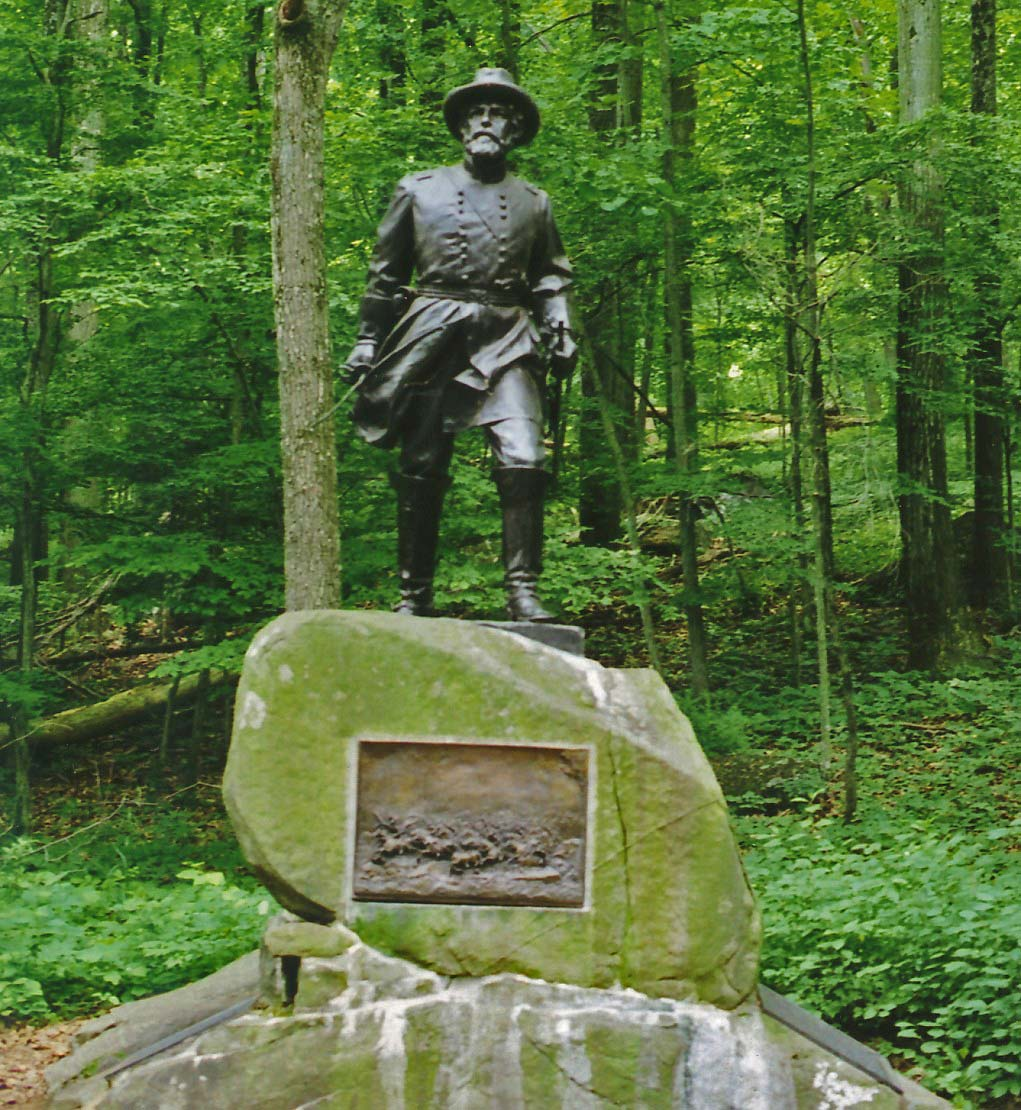
General William Wells (1914), Gettysburg Battlefield, Gettysburg, Pennsylvania. A replica is at Battery Park, Burlington, Vermont.

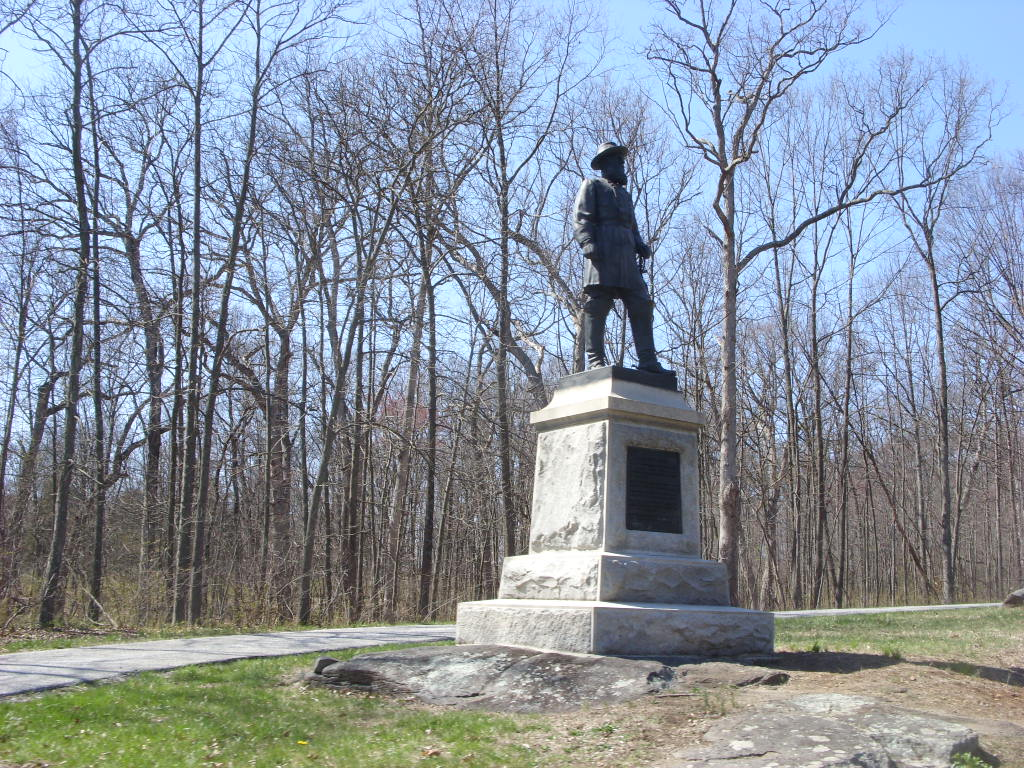
General John Geary (c. 1914), Gettysburg Battlefield, Gettysburg, Pennsylvania.

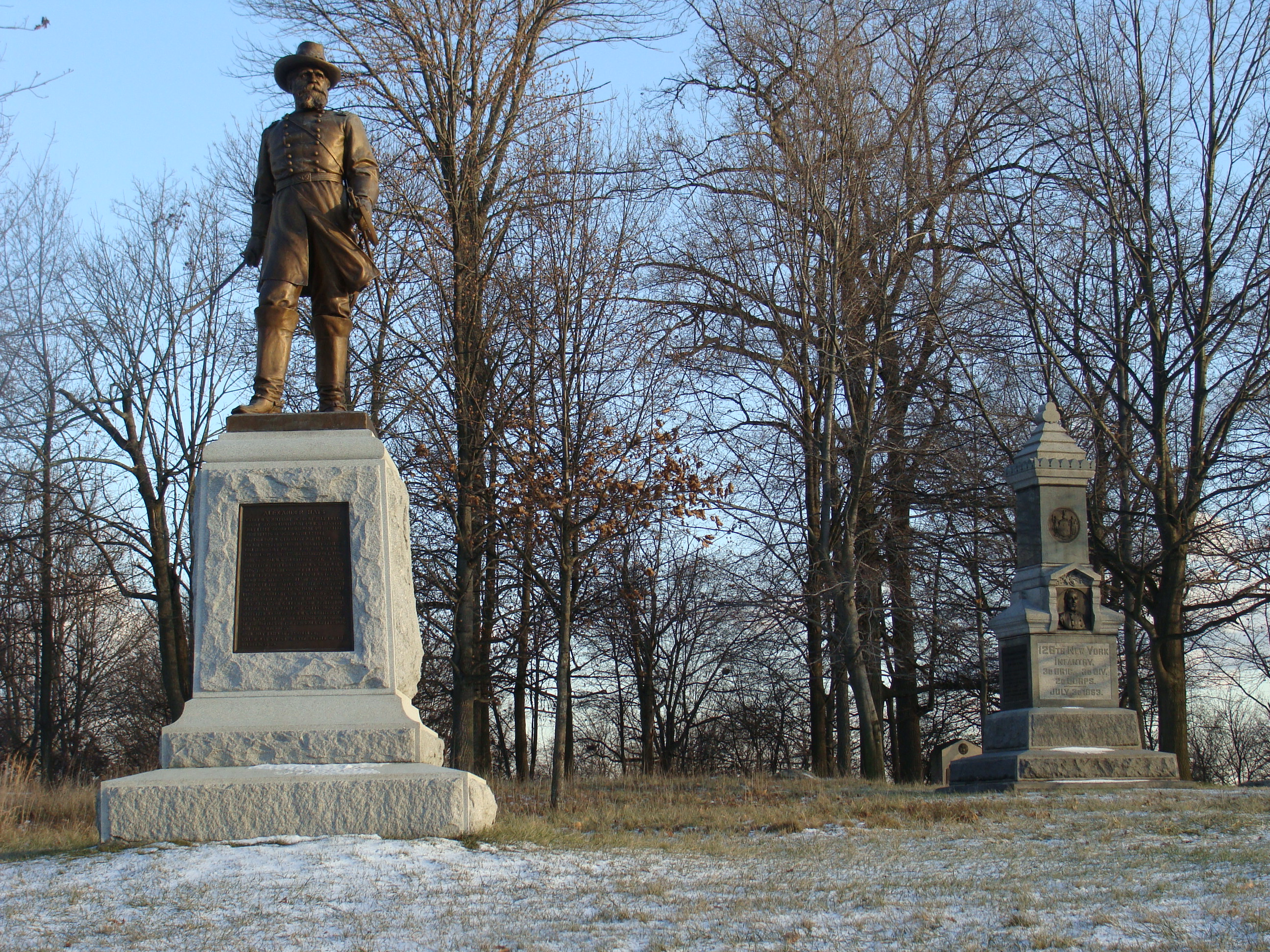
General Alexander Hays (c. 1914), Gettysburg Battlefield, Gettysburg, Pennsylvania.

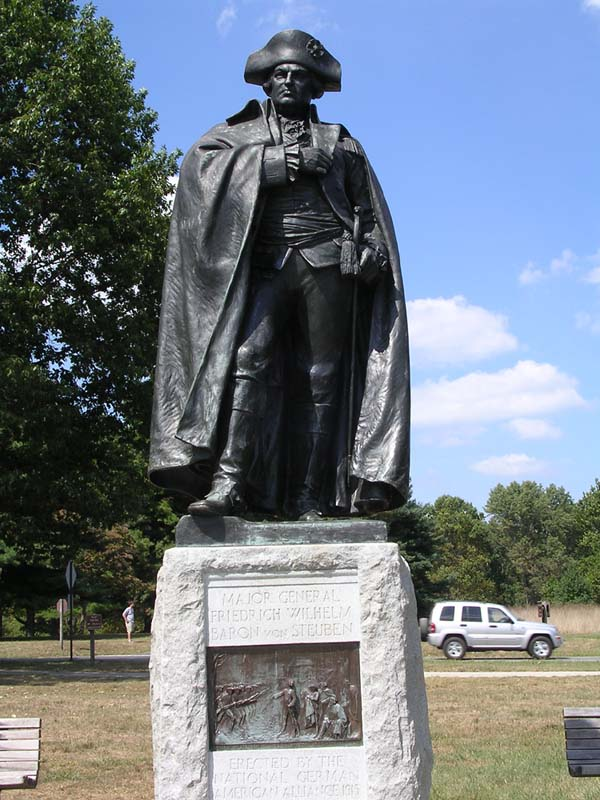
Baron von Steuben (1915), Valley Forge National Historical Park, Valley Forge, Pennsylvania.

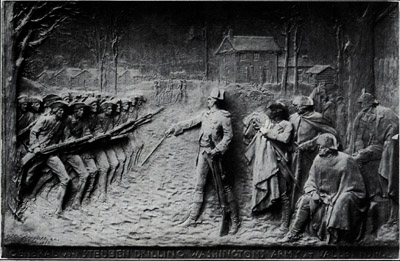
Pedestal bas-relief, Baron von Steuben statue (1915), Valley Forge National Historical Park.

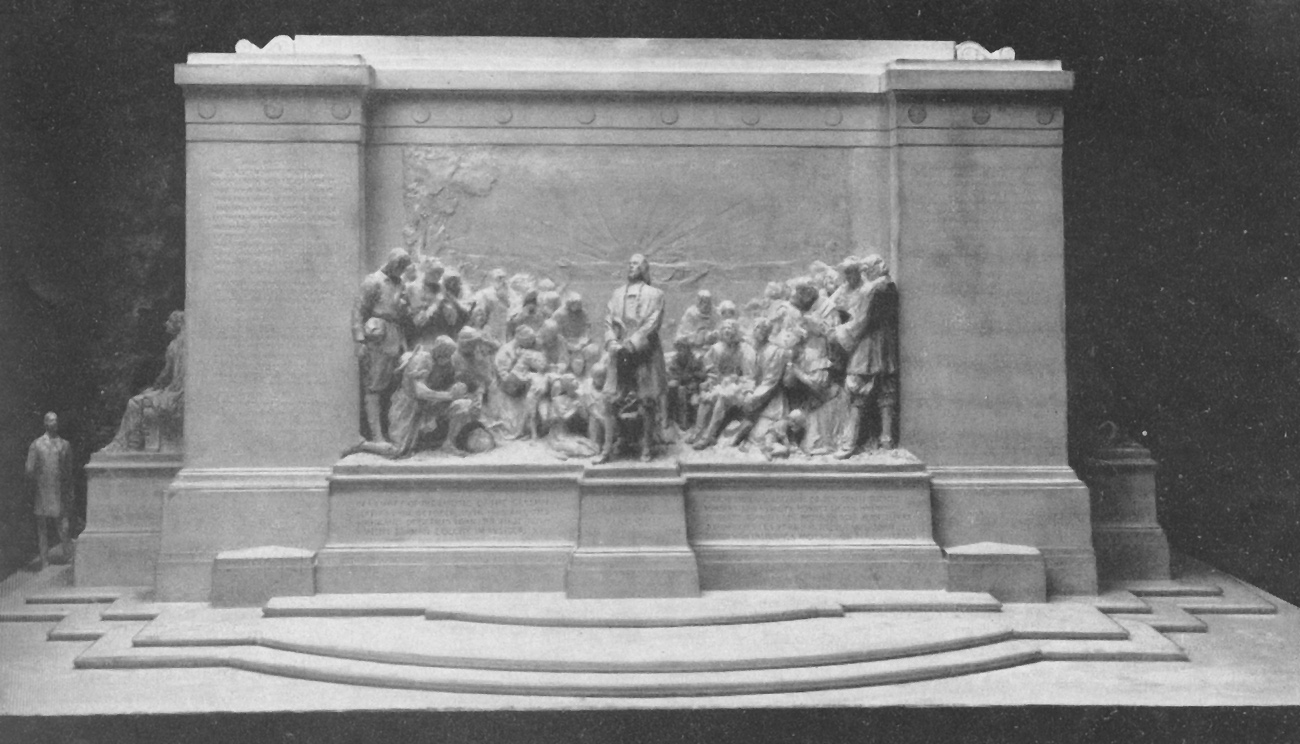
Model for a memorial to Francis Daniel Pastorius (before 1916, unbuilt).

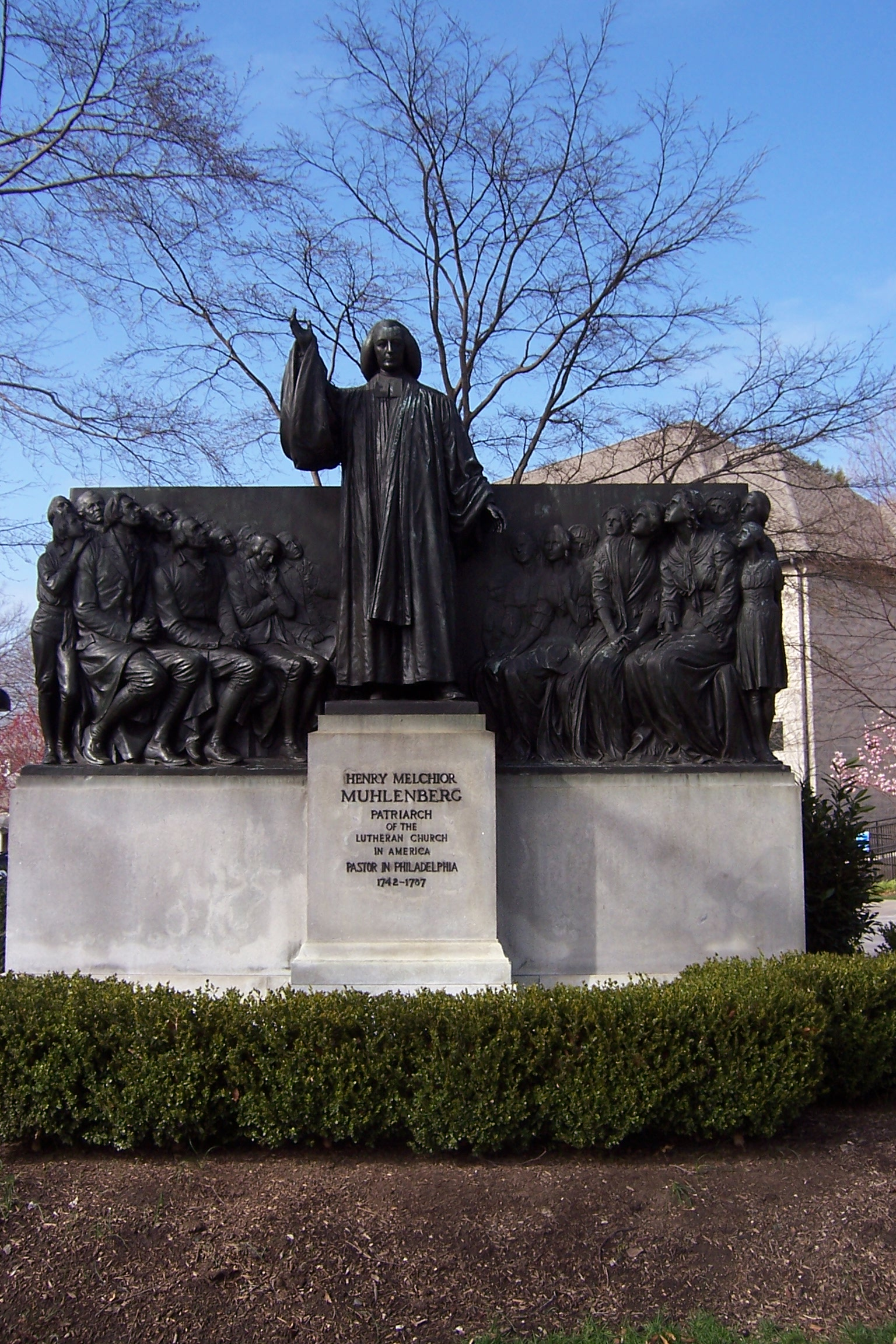
Reverend Henry Melchior Muhlenberg Monument (1917), Lutheran Theological Seminary, Philadelphia.

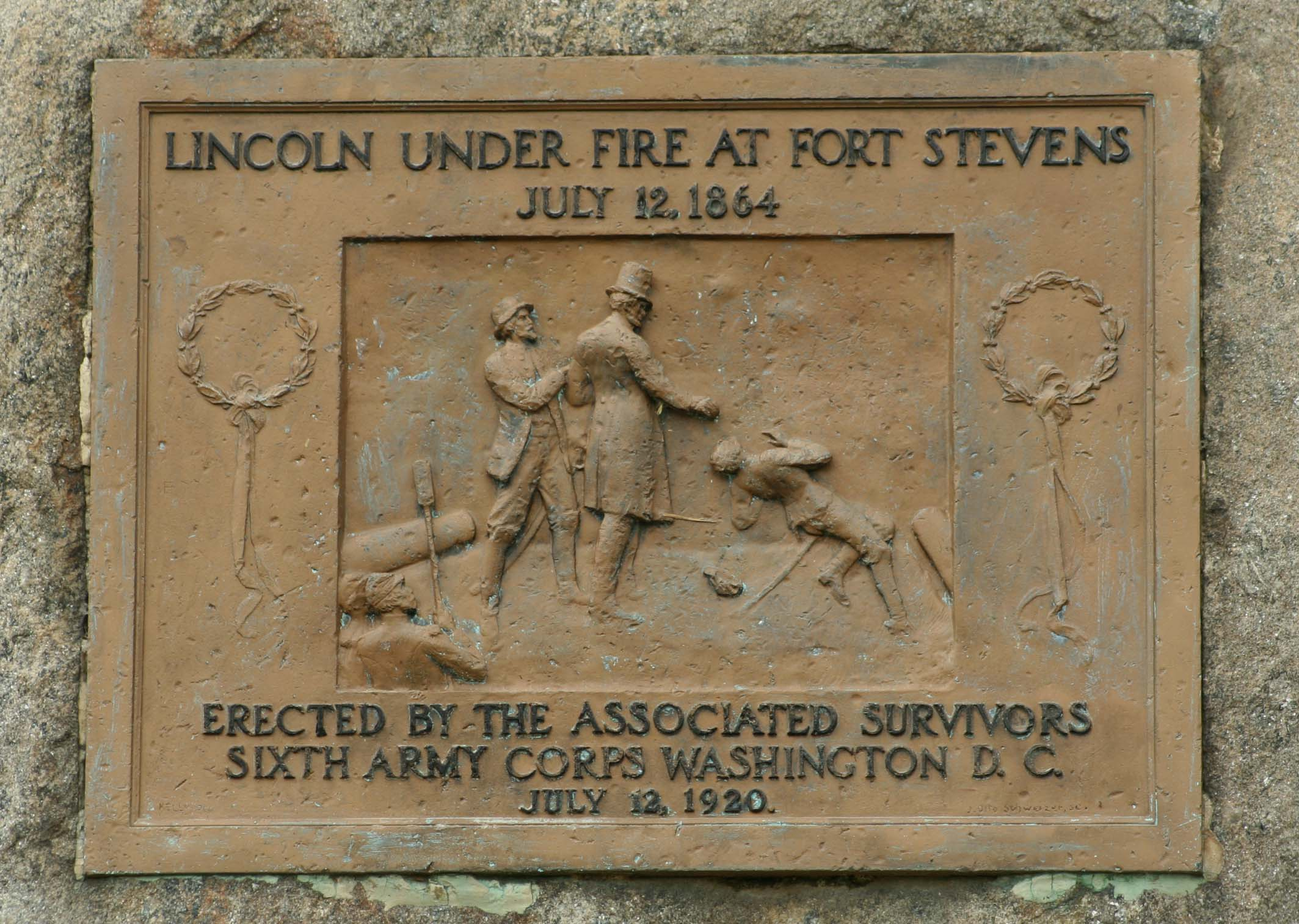
Bas-relief: Lincoln under Fire at Fort Stevens, July 12, 1864 (1920), Fort Stevens, Washington, D.C.

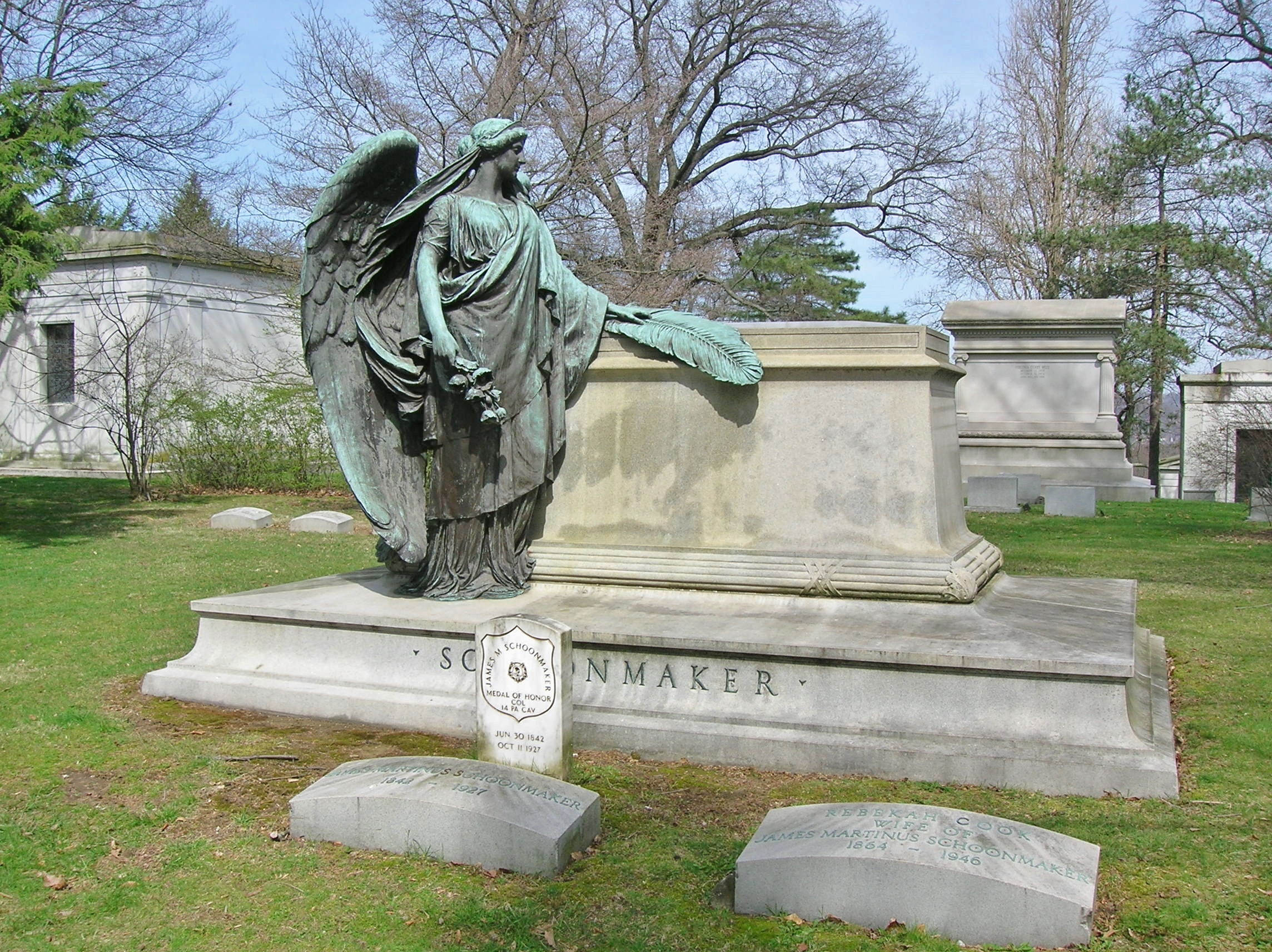
Schoonmaker monument (1920s?), Homewood Cemetery, Pittsburgh.
