= Arkansas Fallen Firefighters Memorial =

- 34°44′48″N 92°17′26″W
- Location: Little Rock, Arkansas
- Designer: Brooks Jackson (architecture), Paula Haskins (statue design), Robert P. Daus (sculptor)
- Beginning date: March 23, 2013
- Dedicated date: March 22, 2014
- Website: http://www.arfallenfirefighters.org/index.php

The Arkansas Fallen Firefighters Memorial is an outdoor memorial installed on the Arkansas State Capitol grounds in Little Rock, Arkansas, in the United States. It was dedicated on March 22, 2014.

== History ==
The 1985 Firefighters Convention launched the Memorial project; however, only $3,900 had been raised by 1994. In 1999, architect Brooks Jackson, a founding member of Jackson Brown Palculit Architects, bid on the project in memory of his grandfather, the superintendent of the Pulaski County Prison Farm, who was shot and killed in the line of duty at the age of 70 in December 1941. Jackson Brown Palculit was the only firm to bid on the project out of 36 firms invited to submit bids.

Artist Paula Haskins designed the memorial's four statues, which were sculpted by retired St. Louis firefighter Robert P. Daus. The statues – "Old Leather Lungs", "The Angel of Mercy", "On the Line" and "Pushin' In" – stand at the center of the Brooks Jackson Memorial Plaza, named in honor of the architect. The memorial also includes the Win Rockefeller Fountain of Faith, honoring the former Lieutenant Governor of Arkansas, who served as finance chairman for the memorial, and his wife, Lisenne. The fountain is incorporated into the fire nozzle held by the "Pushin' In" statue.

The groundbreaking for the memorial took place on March 23, 2013. The $1.2 million memorial was dedicated 364 days later, on March 22, 2014.
