= Steuben Monument =

Artwork by J. Otto Schweizer

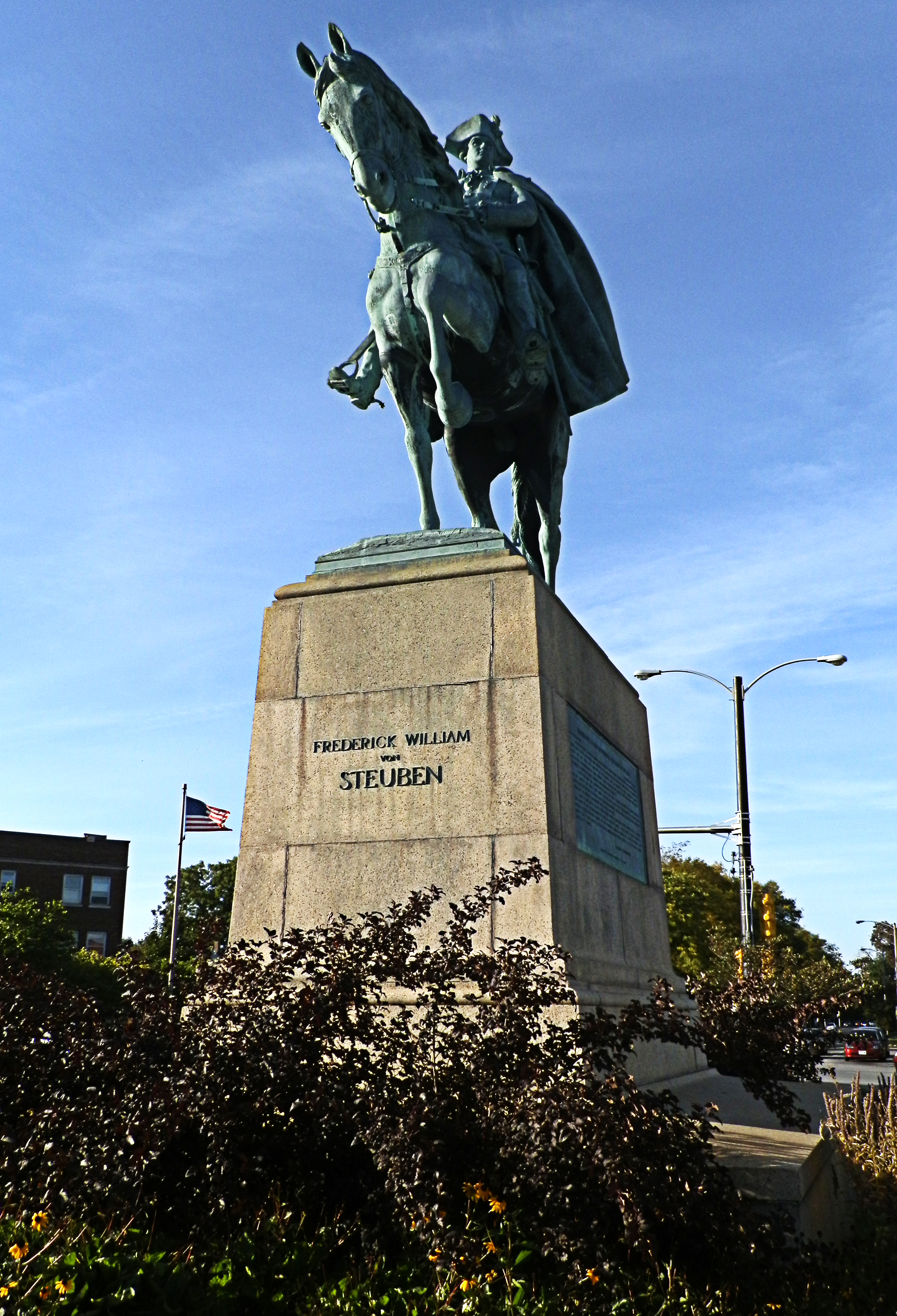
- Artist: J. Otto Schweizer
- Year: 1921
- Type: bronze
- Dimensions: 480 cm (188 in)
- Location: Milwaukee, Wisconsin; 43.057459°N 87.967571°W
- Owner: Milwaukee County Parks Department

The Steuben Monument is a public art work by Swiss American artist J. Otto Schweizer, located on the north side of Milwaukee, Wisconsin. The bronze equestrian sculpture depicts Baron Friedrich Wilhelm von Steuben in his Revolutionary War uniform. It is located at the intersection of West Lisbon Avenue, Lloyd Street, and North Sherman Boulevard.
