= All Wars Memorial to Colored Soldiers and Sailors =

War memorial in Philadelphia, Pennsylvania, U.S.

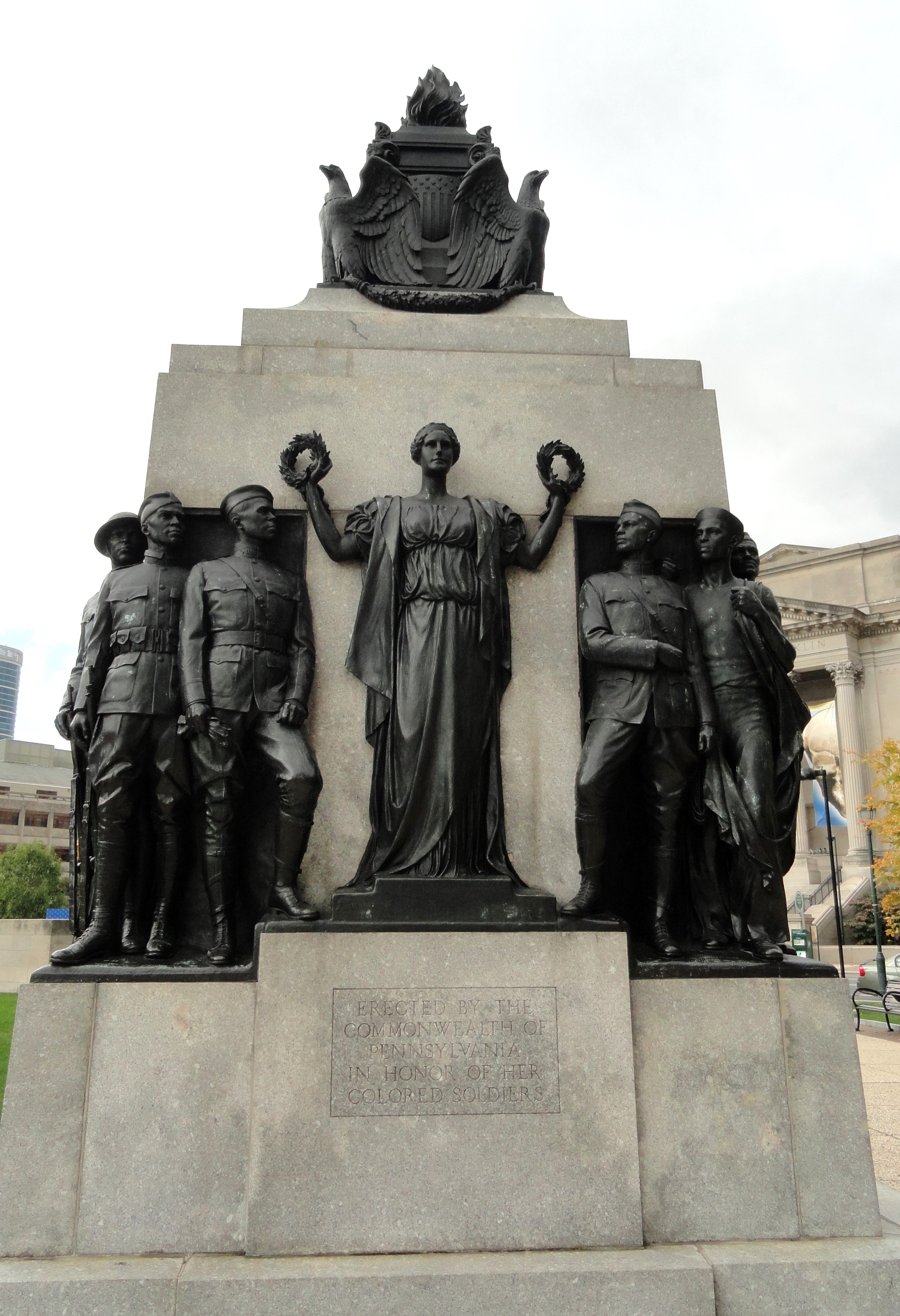

- Location within Philadelphia
- Location: Logan Square, SE corner 20th Street & Benjamin Franklin Parkway, Philadelphia, Pennsylvania
- Coordinates: 39°57′29.9″N 75°10′18.5″W
- Established: Dedicated July 7, 1934; Rededicated November 11, 1994
- Governing body: City of Philadelphia

All Wars Memorial to Colored Soldiers and Sailors is a war memorial in Philadelphia, Pennsylvania that honors the state's African American servicemen who fought in American conflicts from the American Revolutionary War to World War I. Commissioned by the Commonwealth of Pennsylvania in 1927, it was created by sculptor J. Otto Schweizer and dedicated July 7, 1934. In 1994 it was relocated from a remote site in West Fairmount Park to its present prominent site in Logan Square, along the Benjamin Franklin Parkway.

== Description ==
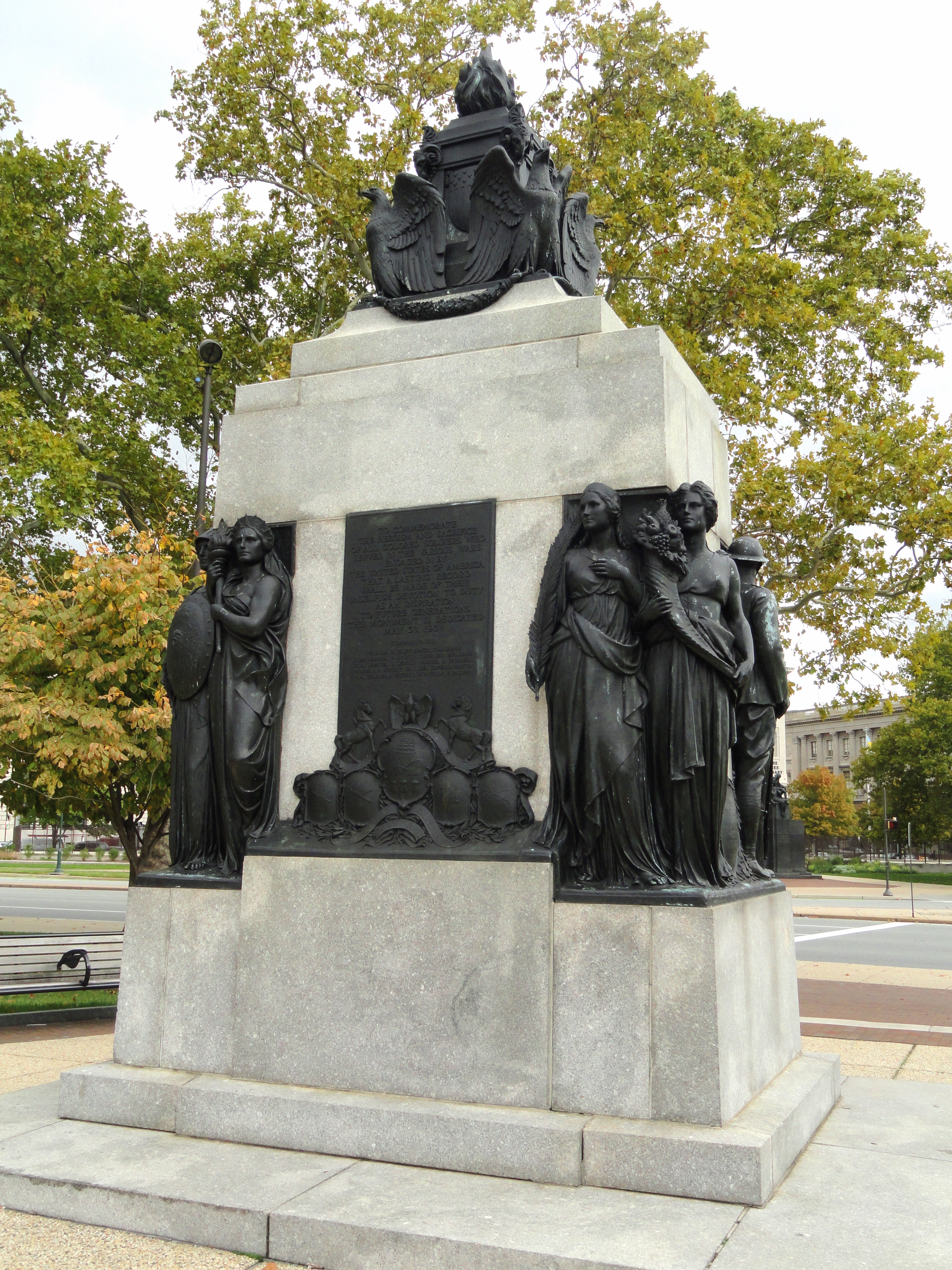
Reverse of the monument.

The monument is approximately 21.5 ft (6.55 m) tall, with a base approximately 17 ft (5.18 m) wide and 13.5 ft (4.11 m) deep. It is made of granite and the sculptures are of bronze.

The front features a "conspicuously Caucasian" female figure of Justice, who holds a laurel wreath in each hand representing Honor and Reward. On her right side are two soldiers and one sailor and on her left are three soldiers, all in World War I uniforms. The reverse features four (again Caucasian) female figures representing War, Liberty, Peace, and Plenty; a dedication plaque, and a bas relief of the Seal of Pennsylvania. The monument is crowned by four American eagles guarding The Torch of Life. All the bronze figures are approximately 6 ft (1.83 m) tall. Justice stands two steps higher than the others, and there is an inscription below her: "Erected by the Commonwealth of Pennsylvania in Honor of Her Colored Soldiers." The bronze dedication plaque on the reverse reads: "To Commemorate the Heroism and Sacrifice of All Colored Soldiers Who Served in the Various Wars Engaged in By the United States of America That a Lasting Record Shall Be Made of Their Unselfish Devotion to Duty As an Inspiration to Future Generations ThIs Monument is Dedicated May 30, 1934", followed by a list of commissioners. On the right side of the monument is a bronze shield listing: "American Revolution / Civil War / Indian Wars", and on the left is a shield listing: "Spanish American War / Philippine Insurrection / World War."

The monument is located in the southwest quadrant of Logan Square, between 20th Street and the traffic circle, and faces the Benjamin Franklin Parkway. The Franklin Institute is to the west, Moore College of Art is to the south, the main branch of the Free Library of Philadelphia is to the north, and the Cathedral Basilica of Saints Peter and Paul is to the east. Nearby are the Aero Memorial by sculptor Paul Manship (a monument to aviators who died in World War I), the Swann Memorial Fountain at the center of the traffic circle (sculptures by Alexander Stirling Calder), and the Shakespeare Memorial (also by Calder).

== History ==
In 1925 Samuel Beecher Hart, an African-American state legislator from Philadelphia, introduced a bill in the Pennsylvania House of Representatives to commission a monument honoring 150 years of service in the U.S. military by Pennsylvania African Americans. The Sesquicentennial Exposition, a world's fair celebrating the 150th anniversary of the Declaration of Independence, was to open in Philadelphia the following year, and Hart's hope may have been that the monument would be one of the fair's attractions. His bill was defeated in 1925, but he resubmitted it in 1927, and it passed. It specified an appropriation of $100,000, but this was reduced to $60,000 in the state senate, then reduced to $50,000 by Governor John Stuchell Fisher. In 1921 Philadelphia had erected twin Civil War monuments – one for soldiers, one for sailors; both modeled by sculptor Hermon Atkins MacNeil and carved by the Piccirilli Brothers – on the newly completed Benjamin Franklin Parkway. The Parkway also was the intended site for the All Wars Memorial.

=== Site wars ===
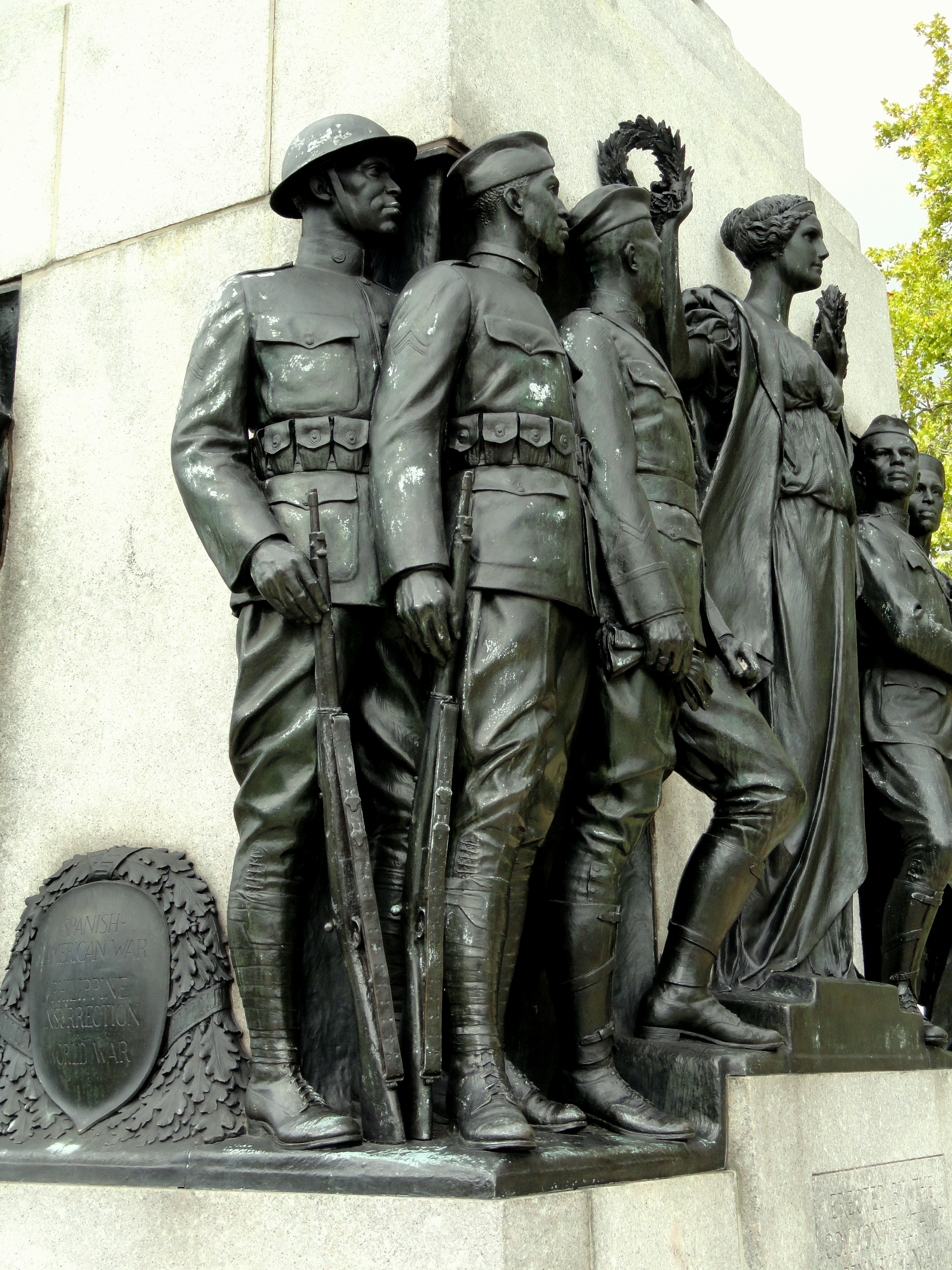
Soldiers.

The bill created a 7-person Colored Soldiers Statue Commission to oversee the monument's completion, and all five of the governor's appointees (which included Hart) were African Americans. Twelve sculptors participated in a design competition, and J. Otto Schweizer was judged the winner. A contract was signed with him in March 1929, but it took five years to agree on a site. Philadelphia's Art Jury ruled against placing the monument on the Parkway, arguing that it needed to "avoid turning the Parkway into an 'Avenue of War Memorials' since most are more or less mediocre, due either to lack of funds or misdirected efforts." Instead, the Art Jury proposed that it be placed in Fitler Square, at 23rd & Pine Streets, a small park in a white, largely-Irish, working-class neighborhood. John Marquess, a prominent African-American leader, protested: "God forbid that we of the Negro group should stand by and permit our patriotism to be insulted." He dismissed Fitler Square as "a wilderness in a God-forsaken section of this metropolitan city. ... Dirty children, drunken bums, pot hounds of sure mongrel strain—these were the lot which sported on the spot where was to be erected a monument to heroic Negro soldier dead." The state commission refused to agree to the Fitler Square site, which left the project at a stalemate.

In early March 1934, with the monument's dedication scheduled for May 30, the Fairmount Park Commission proposed a temporary site on the Parkway with the permanent site to be left undetermined. This compromise was rejected by the Art Jury. City Councilman Henry Trainer, a white Republican, introduced a resolution that the monument be permanently placed on the Parkway, which was approved by a majority in City Council and signed by the mayor. This was a cynical gesture by Trainer and the mayor, since legal authority for placement of Philadelphia monuments rested solely with the Art Jury, but the ploy improved their popularity with black voters and both politicians won re-election. Applying more pressure, W. E. Garrett Gilmore of the Fidelity-Philadelphia Trust Company, owner of an apartment house facing Fitler Square, appealed to the Art Jury in a March 15, 1934 letter: "At the present time we have some very desirable tenants living in these apartments, and we feel that such a statue opposite the apartments would cause us a loss of tenancy." The City Council resolution also raised the ire of other groups whose monuments had been rejected for the Parkway: "The War Mothers and the World War Veterans objected that if their war memorials could not obtain a Parkway site, no one's should, least of all a monument to African American servicemen."

Under attack from all sides, in April the Art Jury tried to pressure the state commission into agreeing to the Fitler Square site. The commission refused, and threatened to erect the monument in another Pennsylvania city. The Art Jury backed down somewhat, and the parties agreed to a compromise site in West Fairmount Park, on Lansdowne Avenue behind Memorial Hall, the art gallery left over from the 1876 Centennial Exposition. The monument's dedication was postponed – its bronze plaque still reads "Dedicated May 30, 1934" – and took place on July 7, 1934. State Representative Hart gave an address at the ceremonies, and his 11-year-old granddaughter Doris was one of six children who pulled cords unveiling the monument.

=== Relocation ===
Over the decades, there were numerous proposals to relocate the monument to a more prominent site, but they were abandoned due to lack of funds.

The Committee to Restore and Relocate The All Wars Memorial to Colored Soldier and Sailors in 1993 began the restoration and relocation process and selected its present Location, based on City the Council Legislation in 1934 of 21st and Vine St. In 1994 the City's Art Commission (descendant of the Art Jury) recommended the relocation of the monument to the Benjamin Franklin Parkway. Philadelphia Mayor Edward Rendell endorsed this, and City Council appropriated $200,000 to make it possible. The intended relocation was announced at a May 9, 1994 press conference attended by State Representative Hart's granddaughter and two granddaughters of the sculptor, J. Otto Schweizer. The monument underwent a thorough restoration, and was re-dedicated on Veterans Day, November 11, 1994. Hart's granddaughter, Doris Jones Holliday, one of the children who had unveiled the monument 60 years earlier, again did the honors.

== Assessment ==
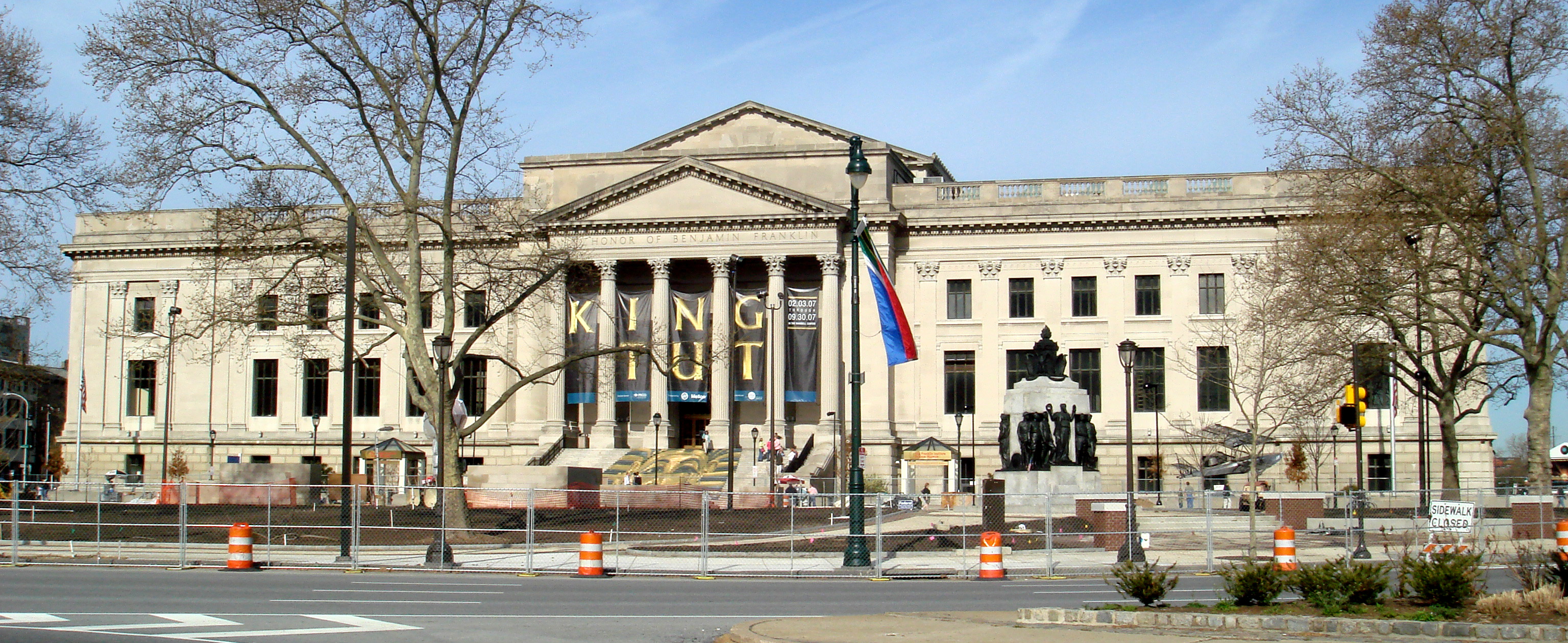
All Wars Memorial to Colored Soldiers and Sailors (right of center) is dwarfed by the Franklin Institute behind it.

Art historian Ilene D. Lieberman notes the great rarity of an early twentieth century civic monument that honors African Americans, or even one that features black figures on an equal or near-equal standing with white figures. She compares the All Wars Memorial to Boston's Robert Gould Shaw Memorial (1884), where sculptor Augustus Saint-Gaudens paid honor to the all-black 54th Massachusetts Infantry Regiment by individualizing the faces of the soldiers. There, the bas-relief black soldiers form a chorus in support of the near-freestanding equestrian statue of Shaw, the white officer on his horse. In the Philadelphia monument the black soldiers and sailors are not a chorus or even supporting players, they are on an equal standing with the white goddesses.

Lieberman reminds us that the All Wars Memorial was conceived, executed and dedicated at a time when the U.S. military remained rigidly segregated, and black soldiers' ability and courage were constantly questioned (or dismissed). "Despite this persistent intimidation on and off the battlefield, African Americans continued to serve in the armed forces, thereby proving their loyalty to a country that still actively discriminated against them."

She sees problems with the relocated monument's siting: Its front, with Justice and the six black soldiers and sailors, faces the Benjamin Franklin Parkway and the busy traffic circle; but its reverse, with the four white goddesses, faces the Franklin Institute and the 20th Street sidewalk, and is much more likely to be viewed by pedestrians and motorists. Unfortunately, like the colossal statue of William Penn atop Philadelphia City Hall, the monument faces northeast, leaving the figures of Justice and the black servicemen in shadow for much of the day.

== See also ==
- List of public art in Philadelphia
- African American Civil War Memorial
