= Confederate Soldiers Monument (Little Rock, Arkansas) =

- U.S. National Register of Historic Places
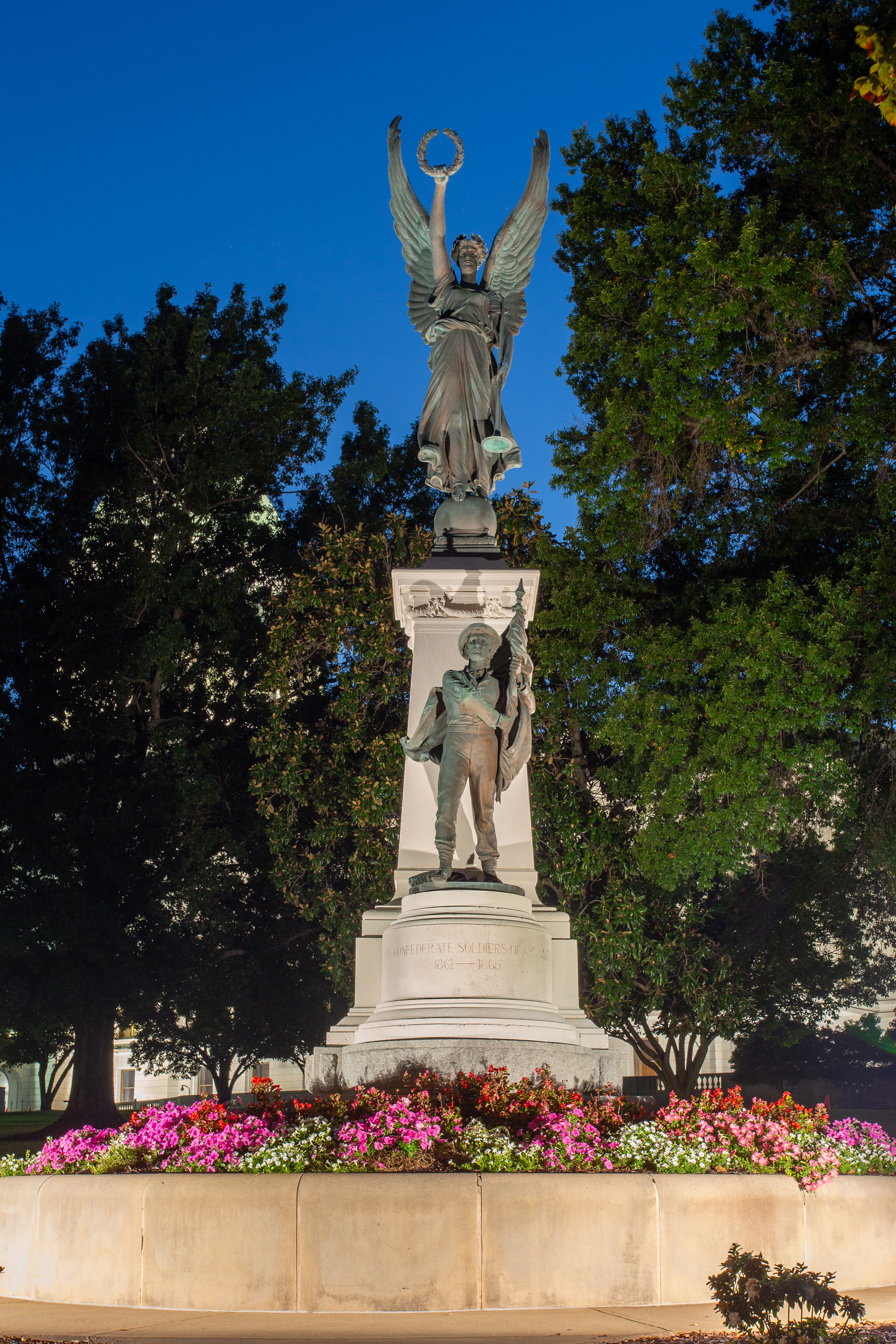

- Location within Arkansas Location within the United States
- Location: State Capitol Grounds, E side of the State Capitol Bldg, 4th St., Little Rock, Arkansas
- Coordinates: 34°44′50″N 92°17′16″W
- Area: less than one acre
- Built: 1905
- Built by: F. W. Ruckstuhl; A. Durenne
- Architectural style: Classical Revival
- MPS: Civil War Commemorative Sculpture MPS
- NRHP reference No.: 96000453
- Added to NRHP: April 26, 1996

The Arkansas Confederate Soldiers Monument, also known as Defense of the Flag, is located on the east side of the Arkansas State Capitol grounds in Little Rock, just off 4th Street. It is a five-tiered marble structure, topped by a bronze statue of an angel standing on a sphere, and a bronze Confederate Army soldier on the front of its fourth tier. It was erected in 1904–05, with funding from a variety of sources, including the state, primarily through the efforts of a consortium of Confederate memorial groups. Originally located prominently near the main eastern entrance to the capitol building, it was later moved to the northeast lawn.

The monument was listed on the National Register of Historic Places in 1996.

== See also ==
- National Register of Historic Places listings in Little Rock, Arkansas
- List of Confederate monuments and memorials
