= Arkansas State Capitol =

State capitol building of the U.S. state of Arkansas

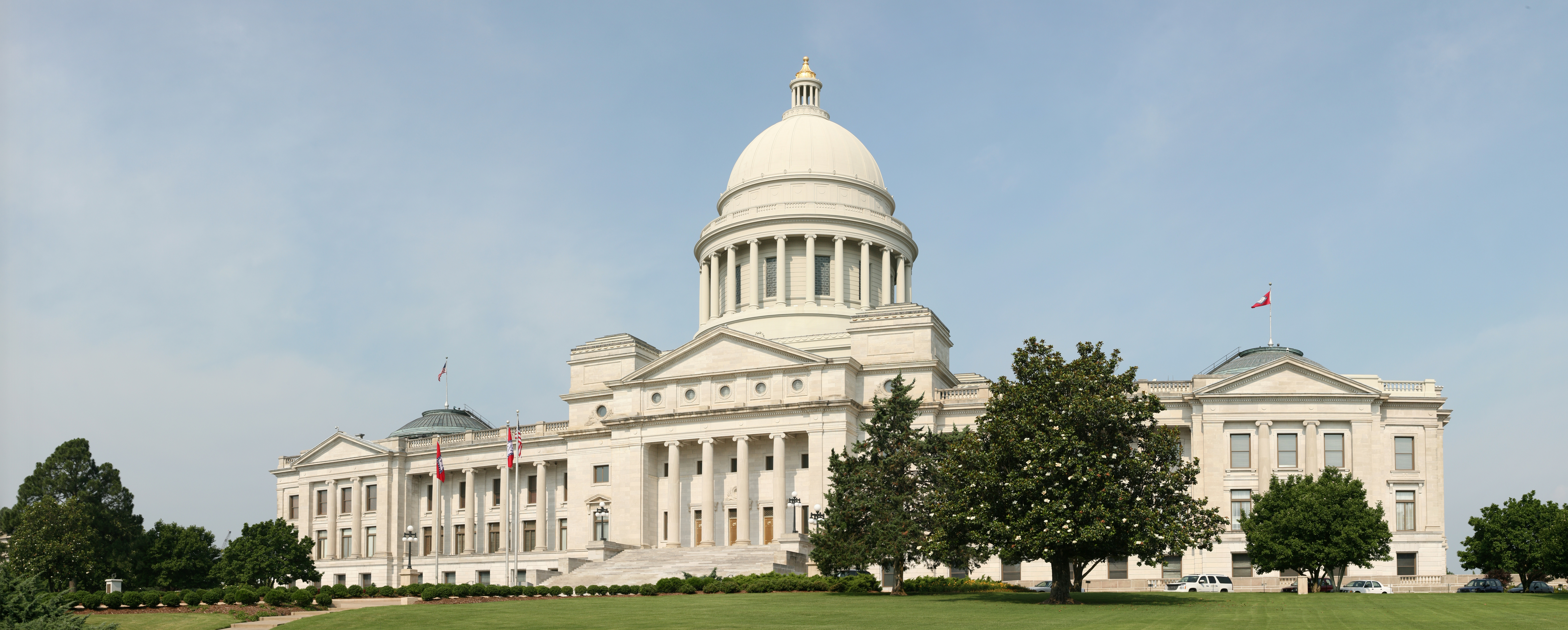
- Main façade of the Arkansas State Capitol
- Interactive map of the Arkansas State Capitol area

General information
- Architectural style: Classical Revival
- Location: 500 Woodlane Street, Little Rock, Arkansas, United States
- Coordinates: 34°44′48″N 92°17′21″W
- Construction started: November 27, 1900; 125 years ago
- Completed: January 1, 1915; 111 years ago
- Cost: US$2,200,000
- Client: State Capitol Commission
- Owner: Arkansas government

Design and construction
- Architect: George R. Mann
- Main contractor: Caldwell & Drake

Website
- sos.arkansas.gov/state-capitol
- Arkansas State Capitol
- U.S. National Register of Historic Places
- NRHP reference No.: 74000494
- Added to NRHP: June 28, 1974

The Arkansas State Capitol, often called the Capitol Building, is the home of the Arkansas General Assembly, and the seat of the Arkansas state government that sits atop Capitol Hill at the eastern end of the Capitol Mall in Little Rock, Arkansas.

== History ==
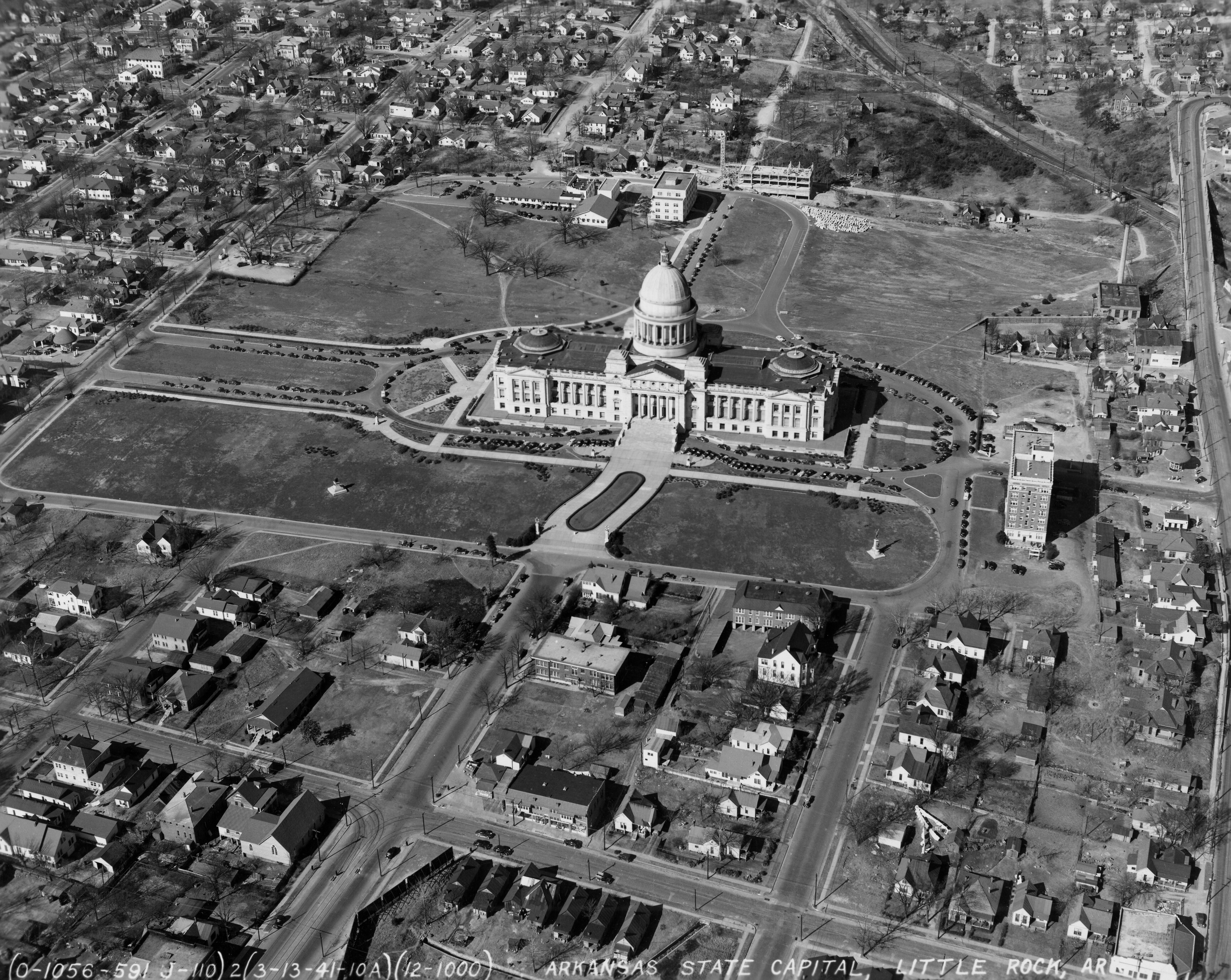
Arkansas State Capitol, 1941

In 1899, the St. Louis architect George R. Mann visited the governor of Arkansas Daniel W. Jones, and presented his drawings of his winning competition design from 1896 for the Montana State Capitol, which had not yet been built in their state capital of Helena. They were hung on the walls of the old Capitol to generate interest in a new building. The drawings' attractiveness eased the passage of the appropriation bills for the new building, and also drew attention to the architect. In 1899, Mann was selected as architect by a seven-member commission that included future governor George W. Donaghey. Donaghey opposed Mann's selection and advocated a national design competition, but the majority of the commission voted for Mann. After Donaghey was elected governor in 1908, he forced Mann off the project and selected Cass Gilbert to finish the Capitol.

Construction took 16 years, from 1899 to 1915. The Capitol was built on the site of the state penitentiary and prisoners helped construct the building. They lived in a dormitory that was left on the Capitol grounds while construction was taking place.

The Capitol foundations were aligned incorrectly by their original builder, future Governor George Donaghey. He centered the building on the centerline of Fifth Street (now Capitol Avenue), but he aligned the building north–south using the still-standing penitentiary walls as a guide without recognizing that Fifth Street was not aligned east–west; like other "east-west" downtown Little Rock streets, it runs parallel to the Arkansas River at a slight angle off true east–west. Therefore, the structure is in a north–south manner from end-to-end, which does not fit the grid street pattern of Little Rock's downtown. This also led to a slight S-curve in the formal entrance walkway between the foot of Capitol Avenue and the front steps of the Capitol.

=== In popular culture ===
Because of its monumental dome, the State Capitol has served as a filming location to stand in for the United States Capitol in Washington, D.C.

- Aired in February 1986, the NBC miniseries Under Siege, directed by Roger Young (director), depicted the bombing of the nation's capitol building. There was controversy within the state after pyrotechnics left surface stains on the dome that remained for several years.
- In 1990, the Arkansas Capitol grounds were featured extensively in external and internal photography for the action film Stone Cold starring Brian Bosworth.
- In 1999, Capitol interiors were used in the filming of Daddy and Them, a comedy-drama written and directed by Arkansas native Billy Bob Thornton.
- God's Not Dead 2 (2016), a faith-based dramas directed by Harold Cronk and starring Melissa Joan Hart, Jesse Metcalfe, David A. R. White, Hayley Orrantia and Sadie Robertson.. Its sequel God's Not Dead: A Light in Darkness (2018) also filmed on the Capitol grounds. It stars David A. R. White, John Corbett, Shane Harper, Benjamin Onyango, Ted McGinley, Jennifer Taylor, Tatum O'Neal, Shwayze and Cissy Houston.

== Architecture ==
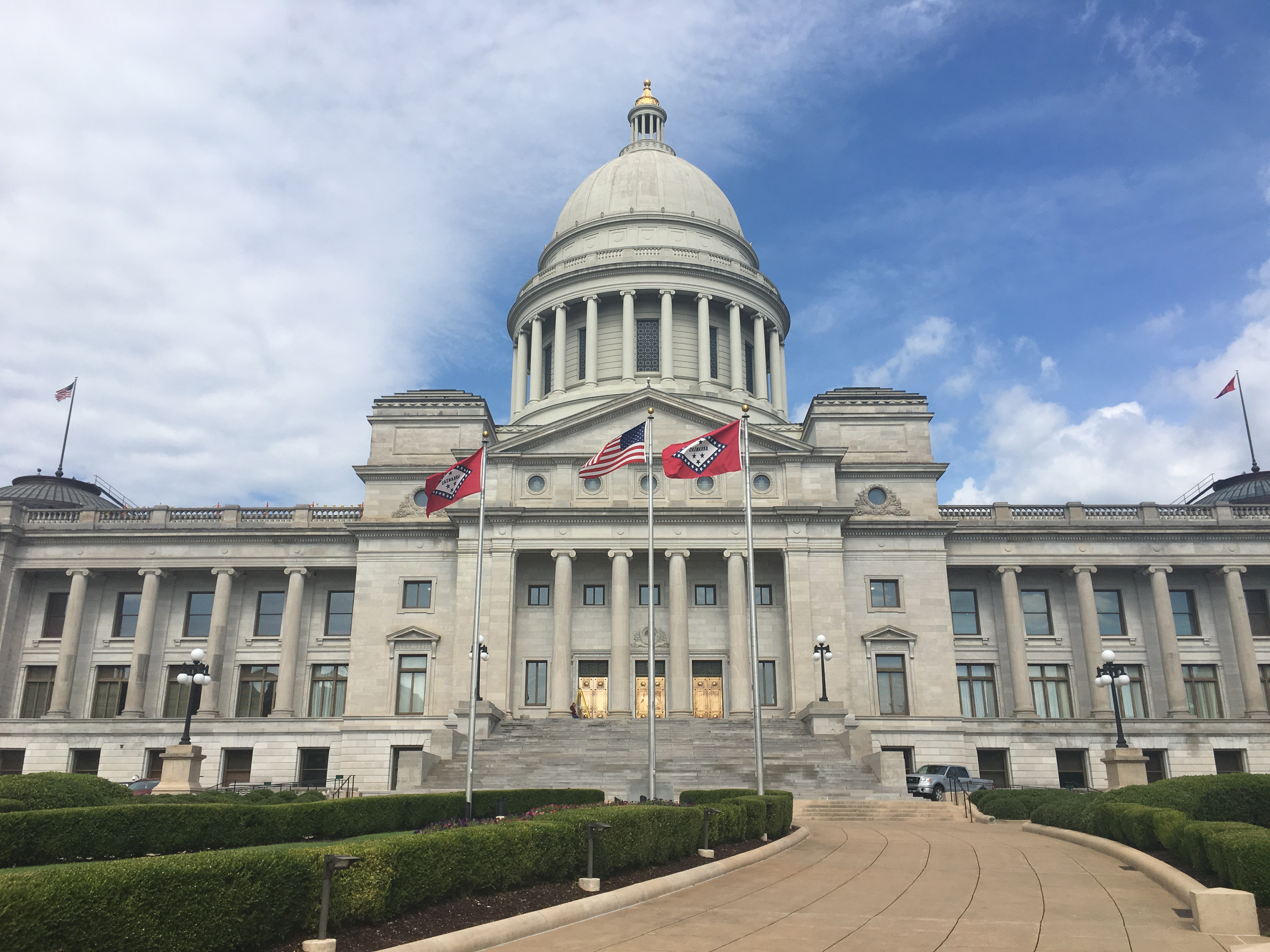
The front of the Capitol

The exterior of the Capitol is made of limestone, which was quarried in Batesville, Arkansas. Though it was initially stipulated a total cost for the envisioned capitol would not to exceed $1 million, total construction cost eventually was $2.2 million (or $320 million in 2014 dollars). The front entrance doors are made of bronze (and have been referred to as Arkansans’ birthright), which are 10 feet (3 metres) tall, four inches (10 cm) thick and were purchased from Tiffany & Company in New York for $10,000. The cupola/dome is covered in 24 karat gold leaf. The government was formerly located in the Old State House. The structure also used Yule marble.

== Monuments and memorials ==
The Arkansas State Capitol grounds has multiple monuments and memorials representing various parts of the state's past and present. They include the Arkansas Fallen Firefighters Memorial, Arkansas Medal of Honor Memorial, Bauxite and Granite Boulders, Confederate Soldiers Monument, Confederate War Prisoners Memorial, Law Enforcement Officers Memorial, Liberty Bell replica, "Little Rock Nine" Civil Rights Memorial, Memorial Fountain, Monument to Confederate Women, Vietnam Veterans Memorial and the controversial Ten Commandments Monument.

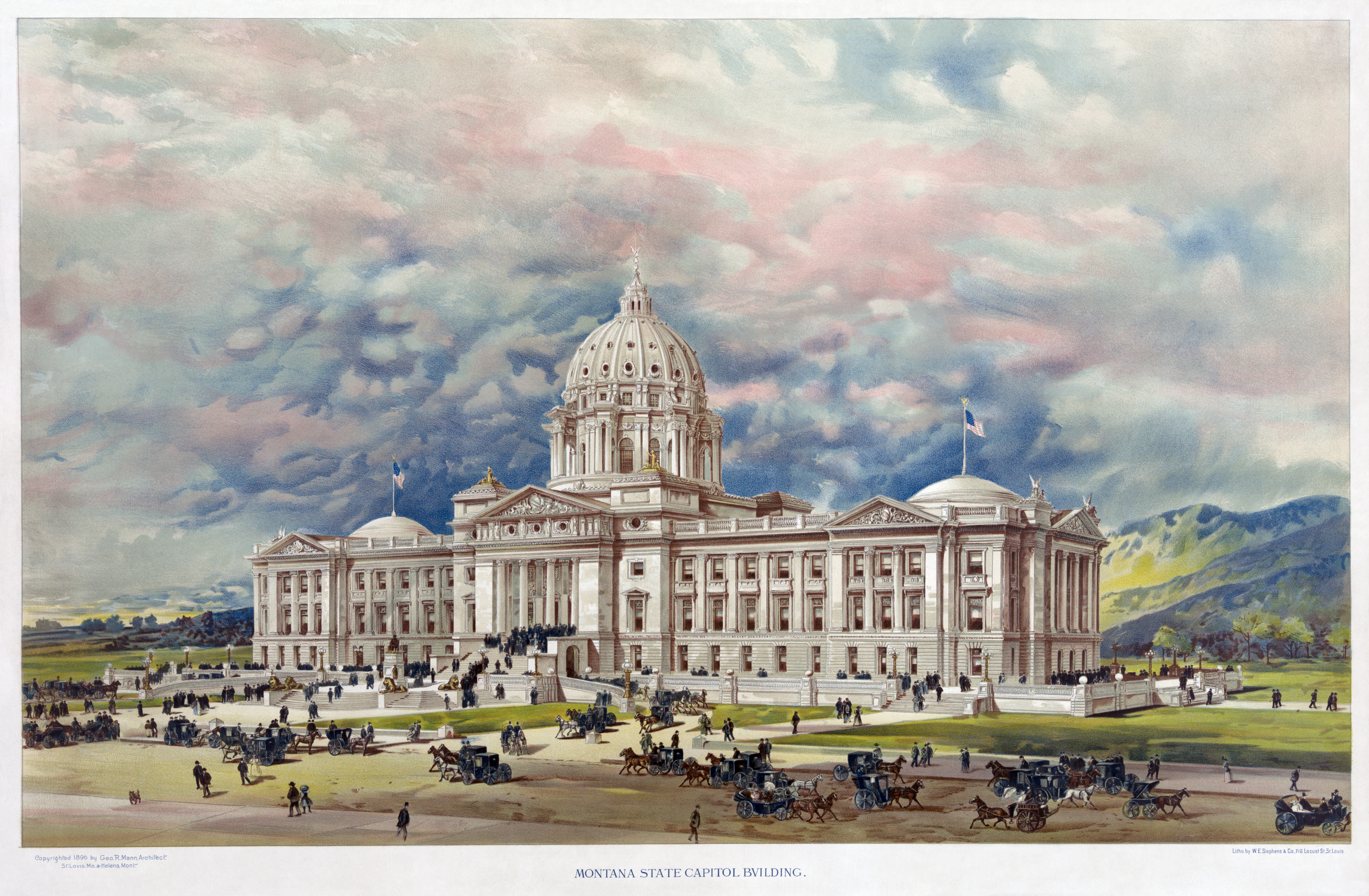
The winning competition design was from 1896 for the planned Montana State Capitol in Helena by George R. Mann, became the model for the Arkansas State Capitol.

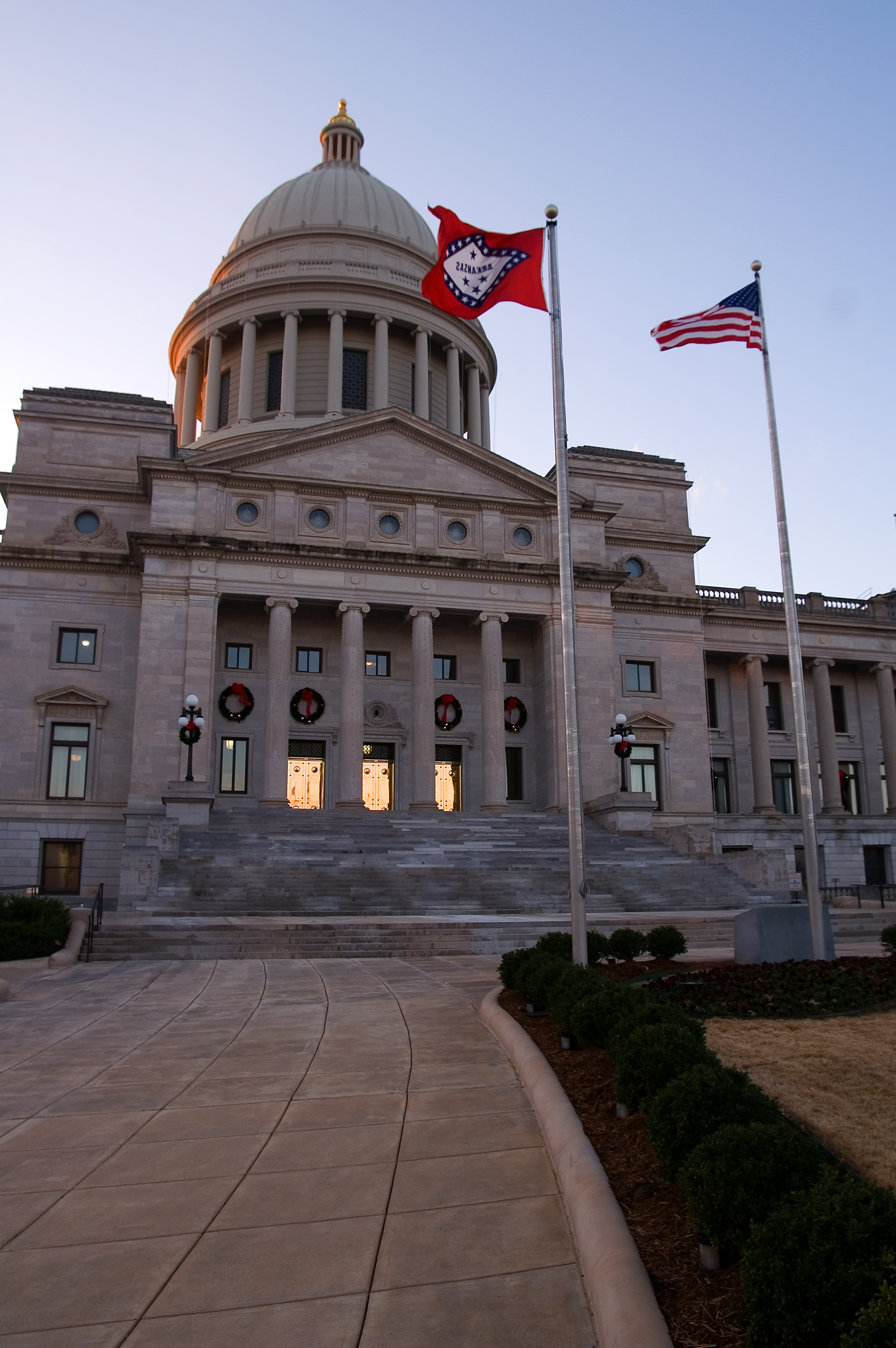
The entrance to the State Capitol

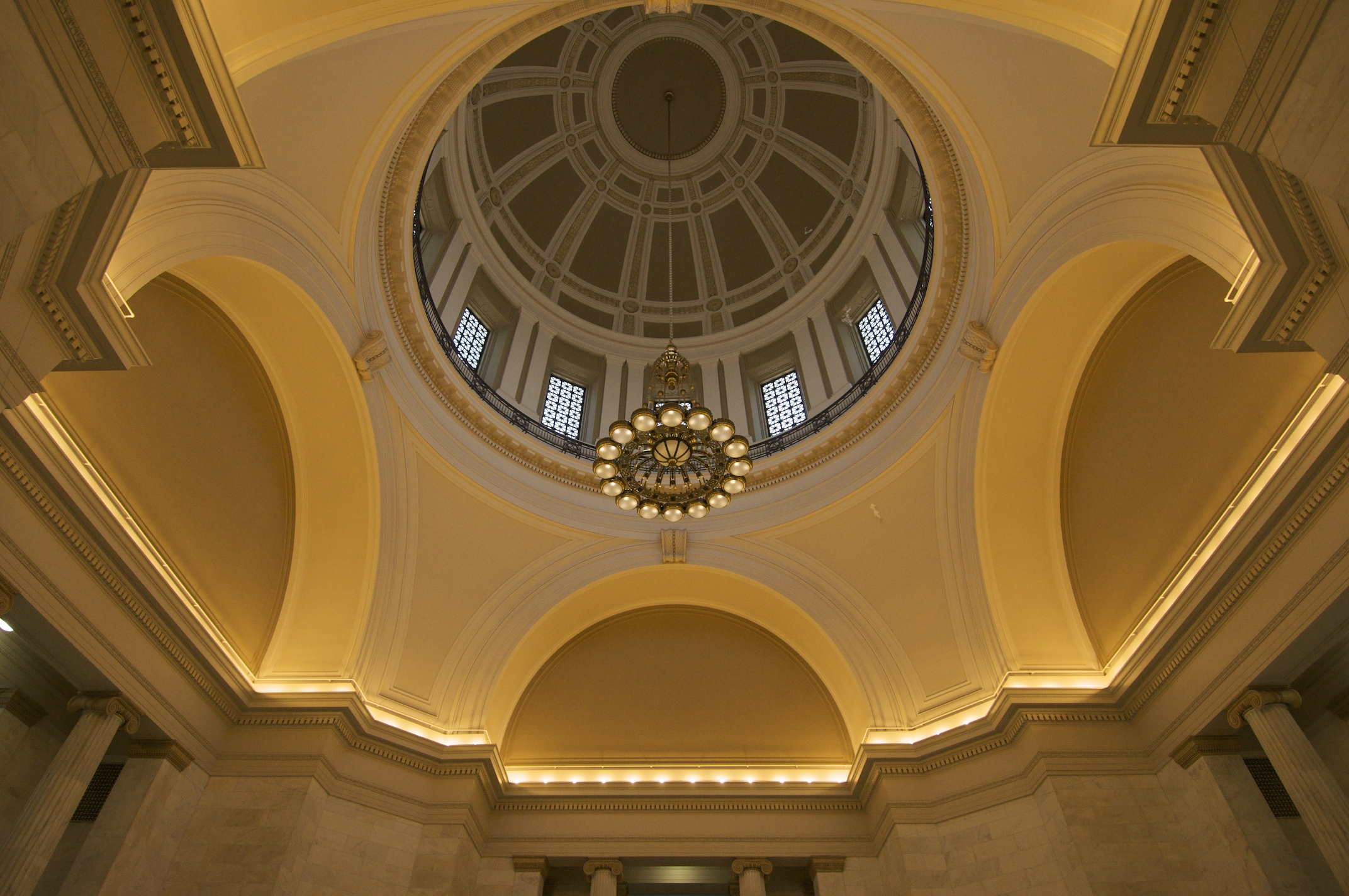
Interior view of the Arkansas State Capitol Dome looking up from the Rotunda.

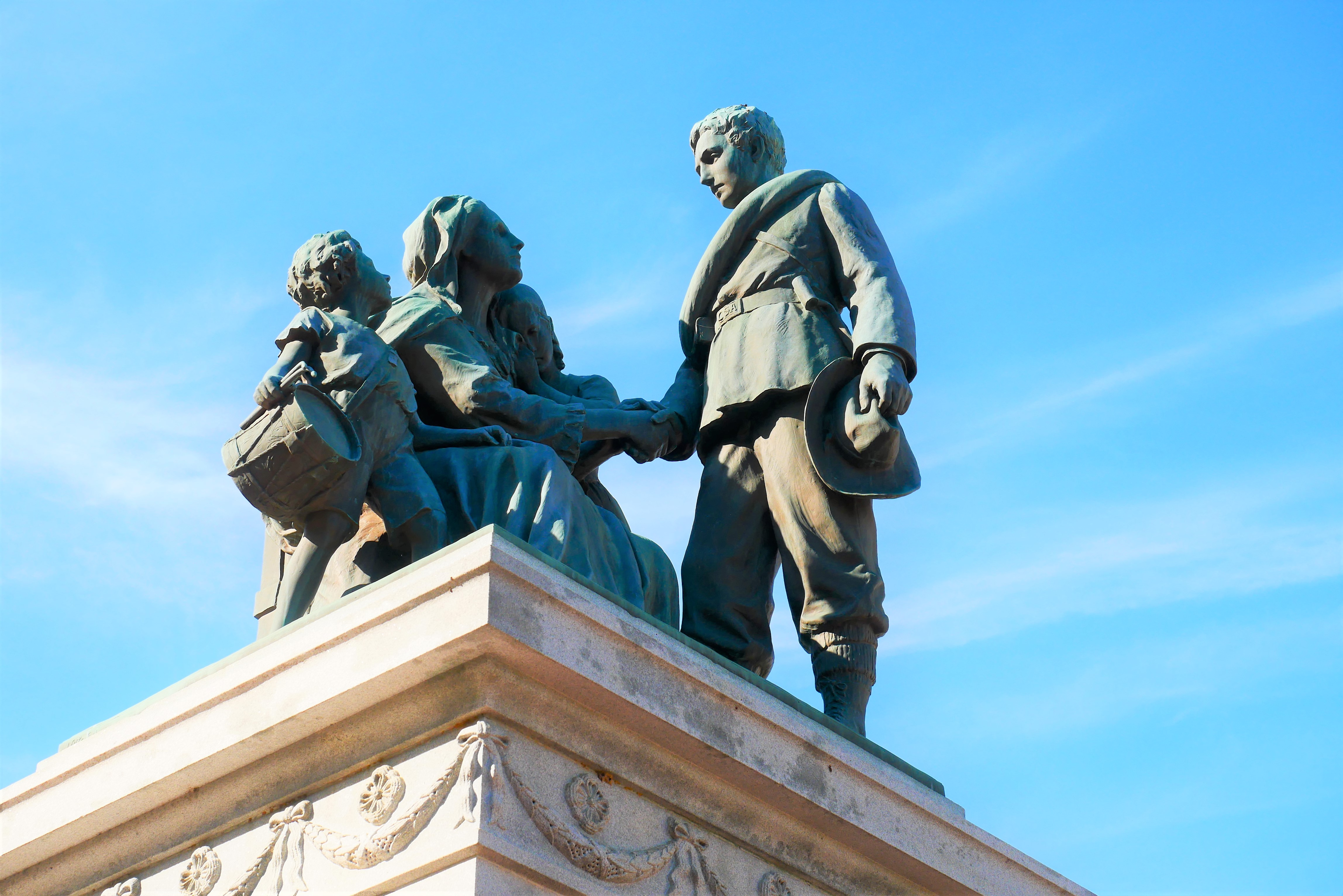
Monument to Confederate Women May 1, 1913 The statue was designed by J. Otto Schweizer. The monument was added to the National Register of Historic Places in 1996.

== See also ==
- List of Arkansas General Assemblies
- List of state and territorial capitols in the United States
