= Samuel Gross =

Samuel Gross may refer to:

- Samuel D. Gross (1805–1884), pioneering American academic trauma physician
  - Samuel Gross (Calder), an 1897 bronze statue by Alexander Stirling Calder
- Samuel Gross (politician) (1776–1839), American congressman from Pennsylvania
- Samuel R. Gross, American law professor
- Samuel Gross (Medal of Honor) (1891–1934), United States Marine Corps corporal and Medal of Honor recipient
- Sam Gross (born 1933), American cartoonist
