= Swann Memorial Fountain =

Fountain by Alexander Stirling Calder

Coordinates: 39°57′28.62″N 75°10′14.95″W

- Fountain of the Three Rivers
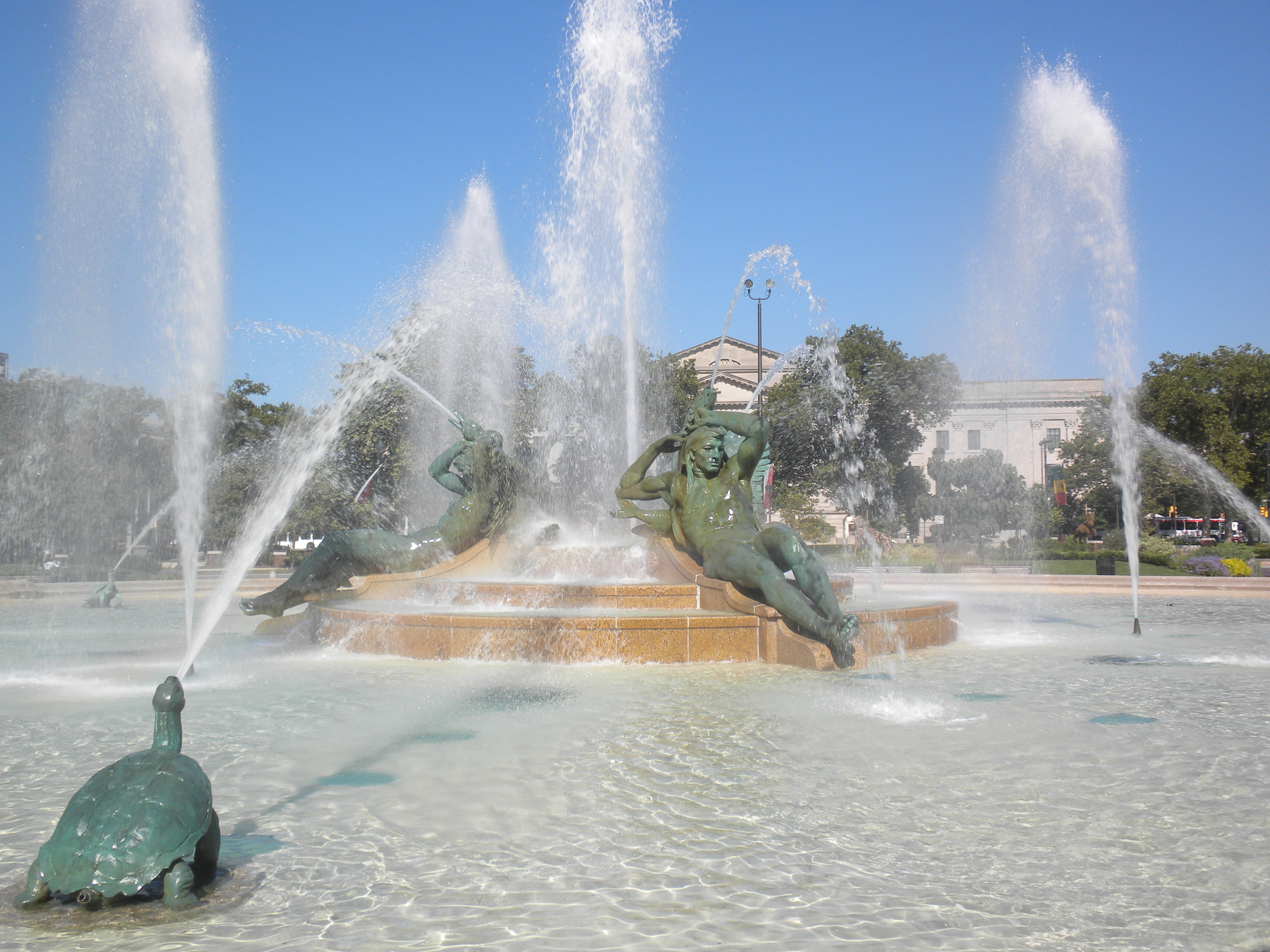
- Artist: Alexander Stirling Calder
- Year: 1924
- Type: Sculpture

Philadelphia Register of Historic Places
- Location: Benjamin Franklin Parkway and 19th St., Philadelphia, Pennsylvania, U.S.

The Swann Memorial Fountain (also known as the Fountain of the Three Rivers) is an art deco fountain sculpture located in the center of Logan Circle in Philadelphia, Pennsylvania, United States.

== Creation ==
The fountain, by Alexander Stirling Calder designed with architect Wilson Eyre, memorializes Wilson Cary Swann, founder of the Philadelphia Fountain Society. The Society had been planning a memorial fountain in honor of its late president and founder. After agreeing that the fountain would become city property, the society was granted the site in the center of Logan Circle.

== Description ==
Adapting the tradition of “river god” sculpture, Calder created large Native American figures to symbolize the area's major streams, the Delaware, the Schuylkill, and the Wissahickon. The young girl leaning on her side against an agitated, water-spouting swan represents the Wissahickon Creek; the mature woman holding the neck of a swan stands for the Schuylkill River; and the male figure, reaching above his head to grasp his bow as a large pike sprays water over him, symbolizes the Delaware River. Sculpted frogs and turtles spout water toward the 50-foot (15 m) geyser in the center, though typically the geyser only spouts 25 ft (8 m). The use of swans is a pun on Dr. Swann's name. Eyre designed the basin and the interlacing water jets, including the central geyser.

== Swimming ==
During warm months, swimming in the fountain is a long-standing Philadelphia tradition. In the summer of 2006, the City of Philadelphia began enforcing a swimming ban with a nearly constant security presence, but the ban was eliminated in 2009.

== Connections to nearby sculptures ==
Besides serving as the center of Logan Square, the Fountain also stands as the midpoint on the Benjamin Franklin Parkway, which includes also sculptures by two other generations of the Calder family. Stirling Calder's father, Alexander Milne Calder, designed the statue of William Penn atop the tower of City Hall at the southeast end, while, at the Philadelphia Museum of Art on the northwest end, the mobile Ghosts is by Alexander Calder, Stirling Calder's son. This led to a local wit referring to the three sculptures as the Father, the Son and the Holy Ghost.

== Nearby vegetation ==
For many years the fountain was framed by a circle of Paulownia trees, which have since been replaced. The garden is planted and maintained by The Pennsylvania Horticultural Society.

== Depictions in music ==
The fountain was mentioned in songs by the pop punk band The Wonder Years. The song "Logan Circle" from their album The Upsides opens with "They turned on the fountain today at Logan Circle"; there are several references to the fountain and the city of Philadelphia in the band's lyrics. It is the subject of the song "Spit Fountain" by Philadelphia emo band Algernon Cadwallader. It is also featured in the Philly level of Tony Hawk's Pro Skater 2 and in an episode of the television show It's Always Sunny in Philadelphia, "Dennis Reynolds: An Erotic Life".

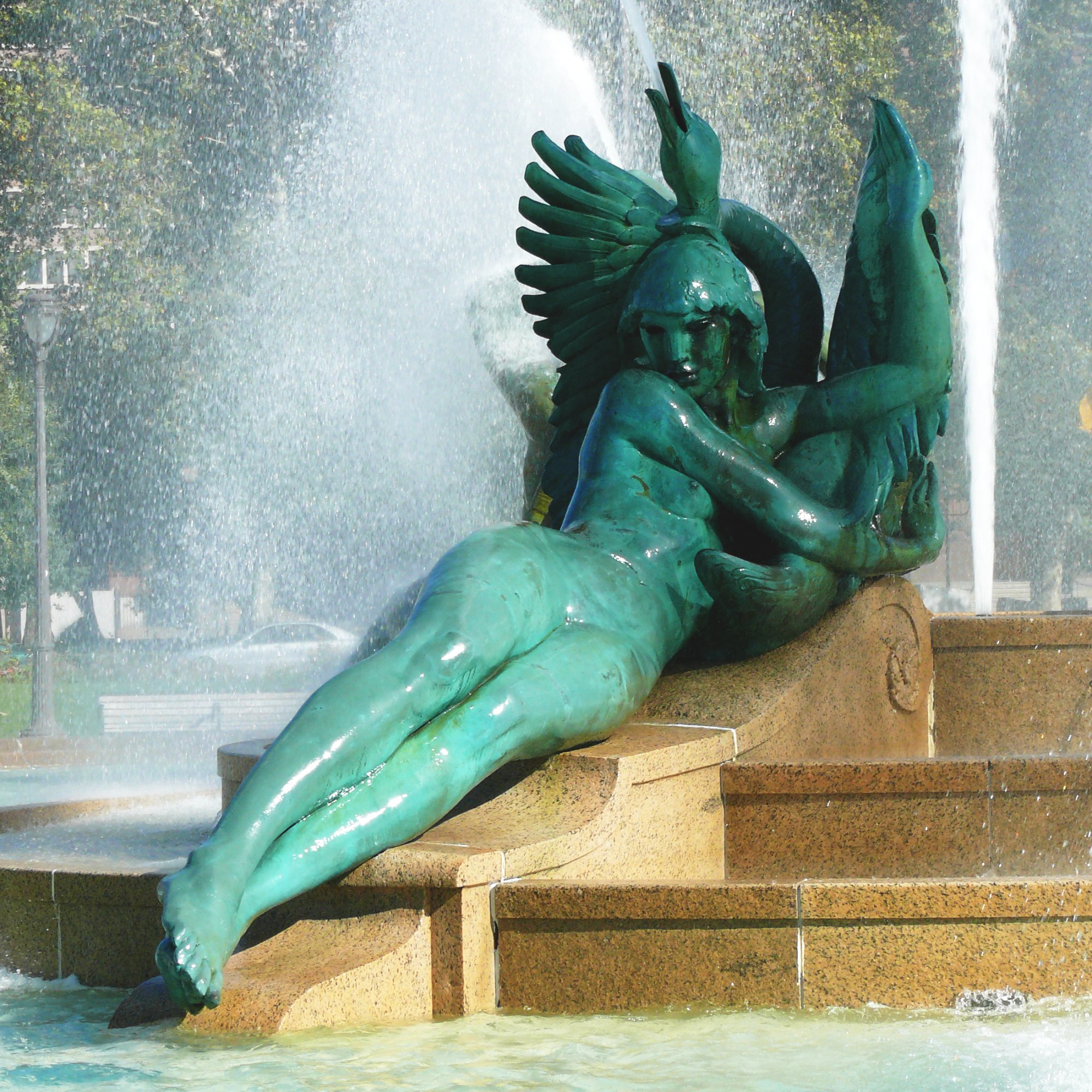
The Wissahickon

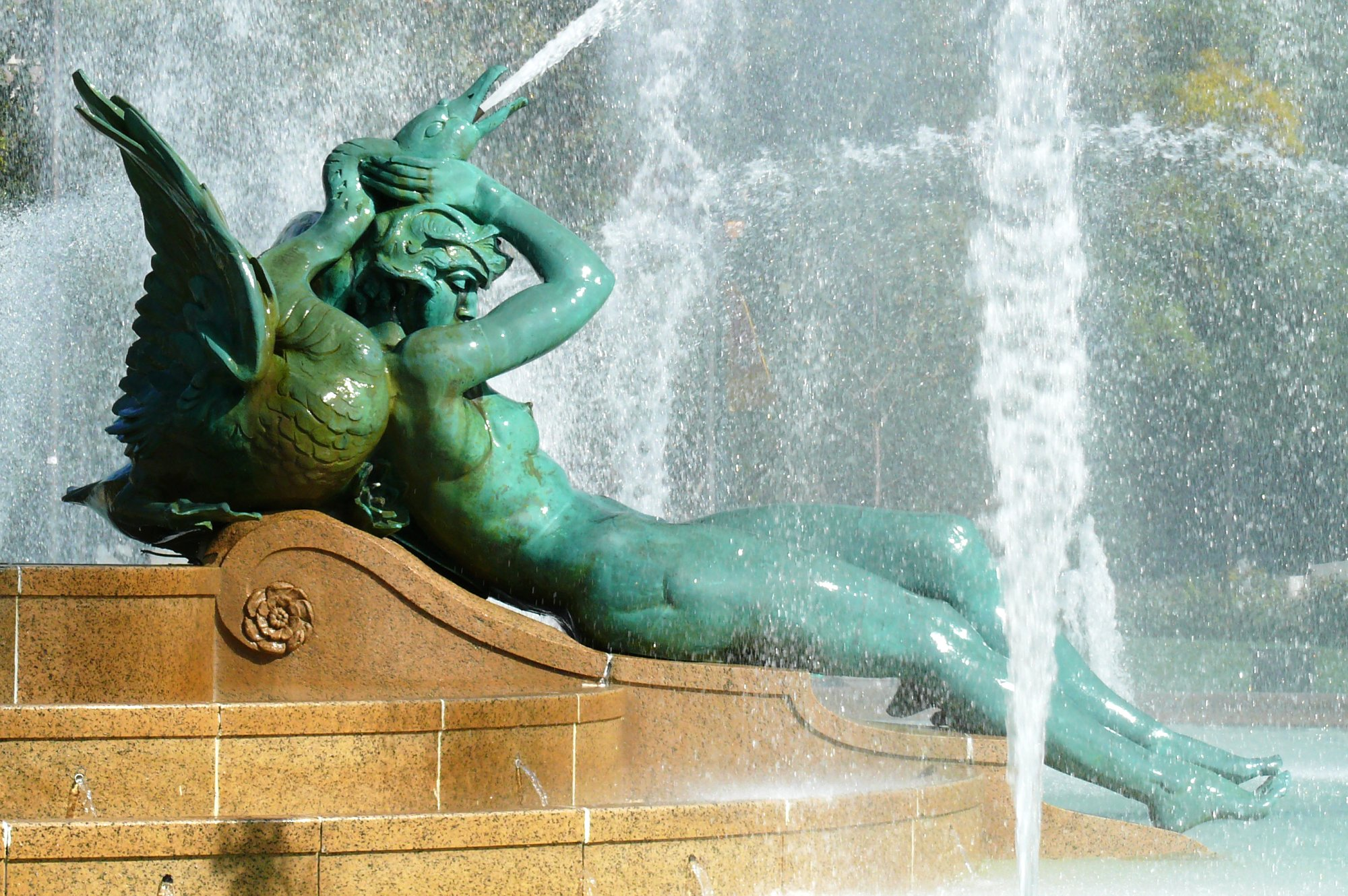
The Schuylkill

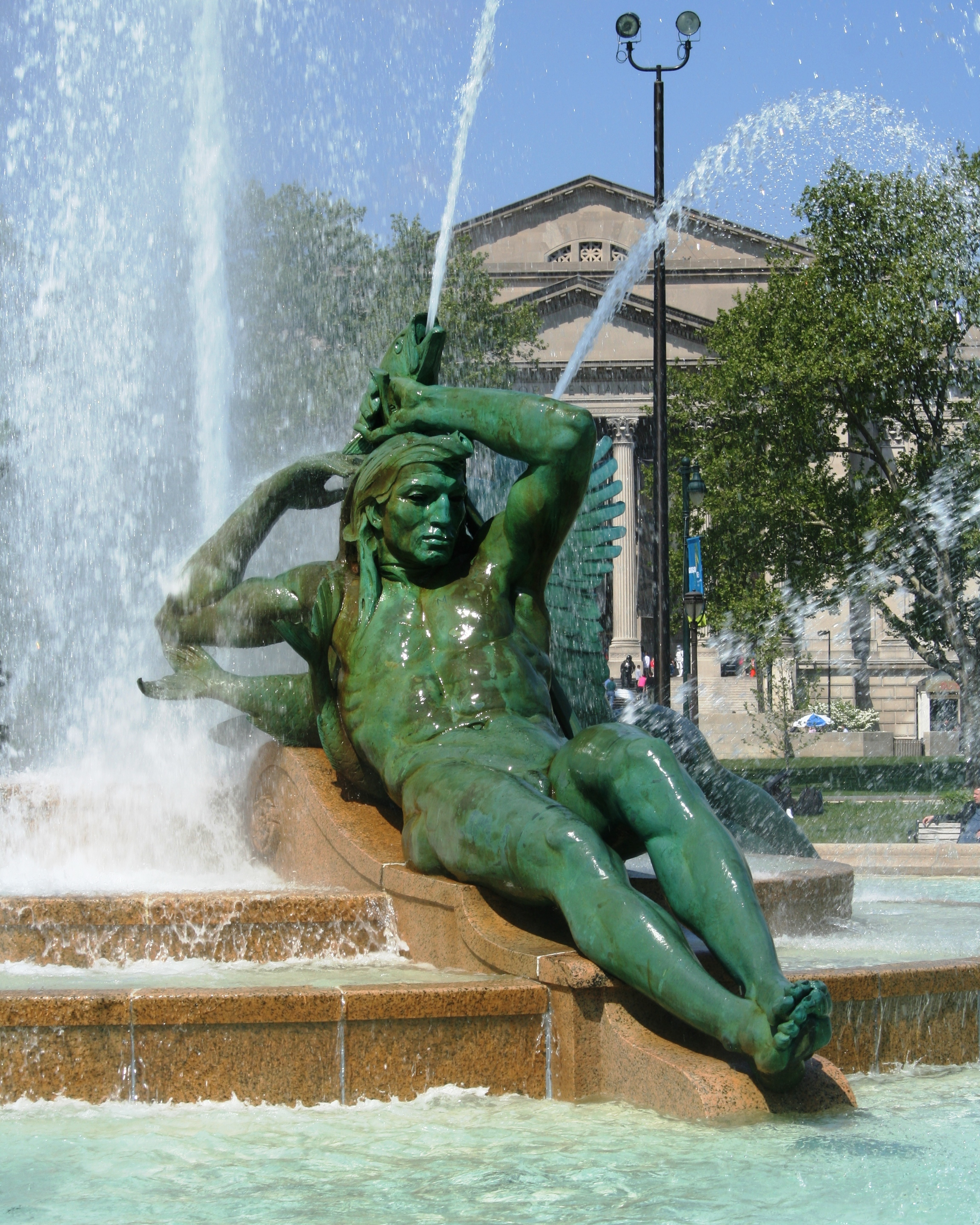
The Delaware

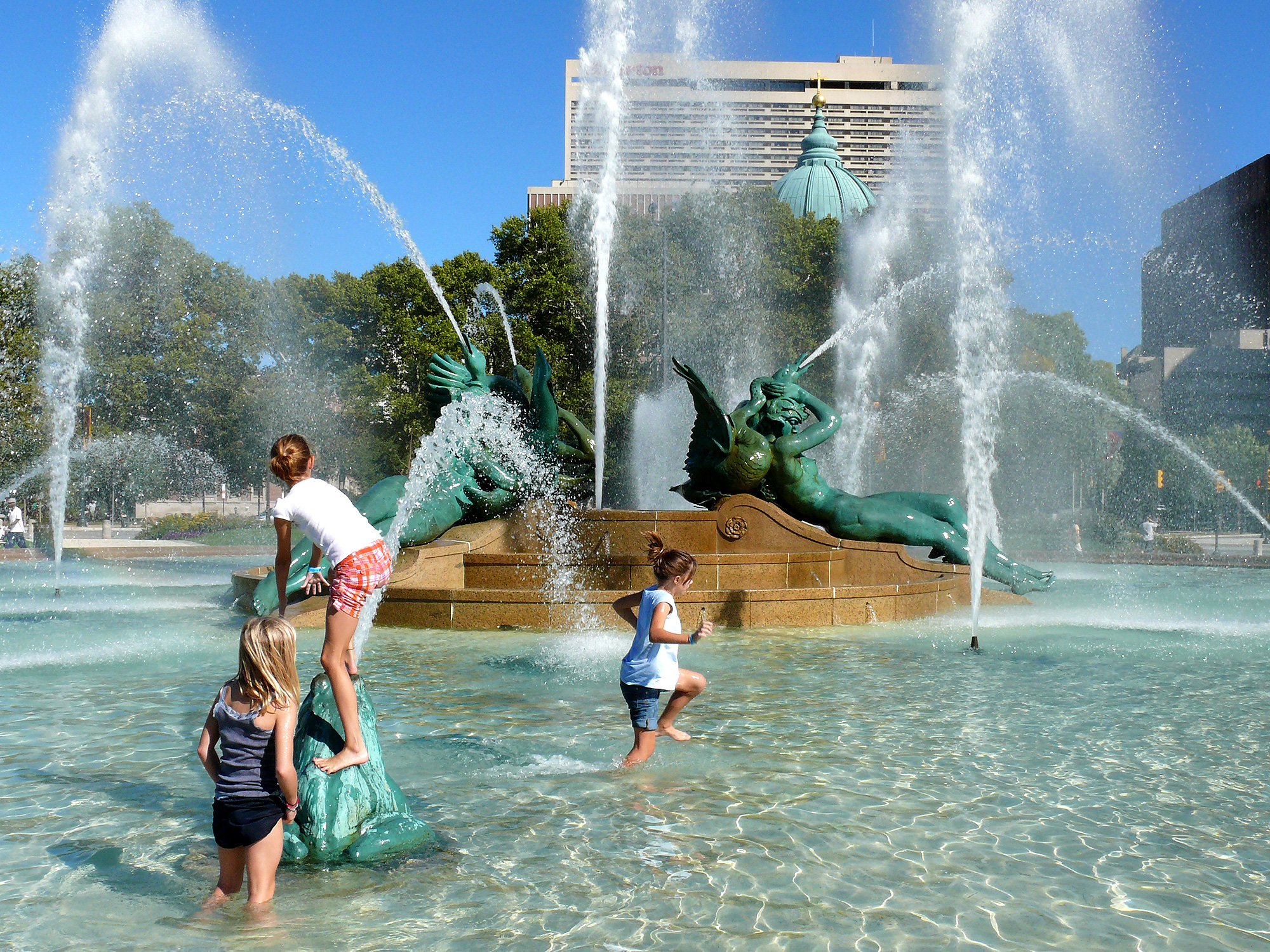
Children playing in the fountain

== See also ==
- List of public art in Philadelphia
- Drinking fountains in Philadelphia
