= Depew Memorial Fountain =

Fountain in Indianapolis, Indiana, US

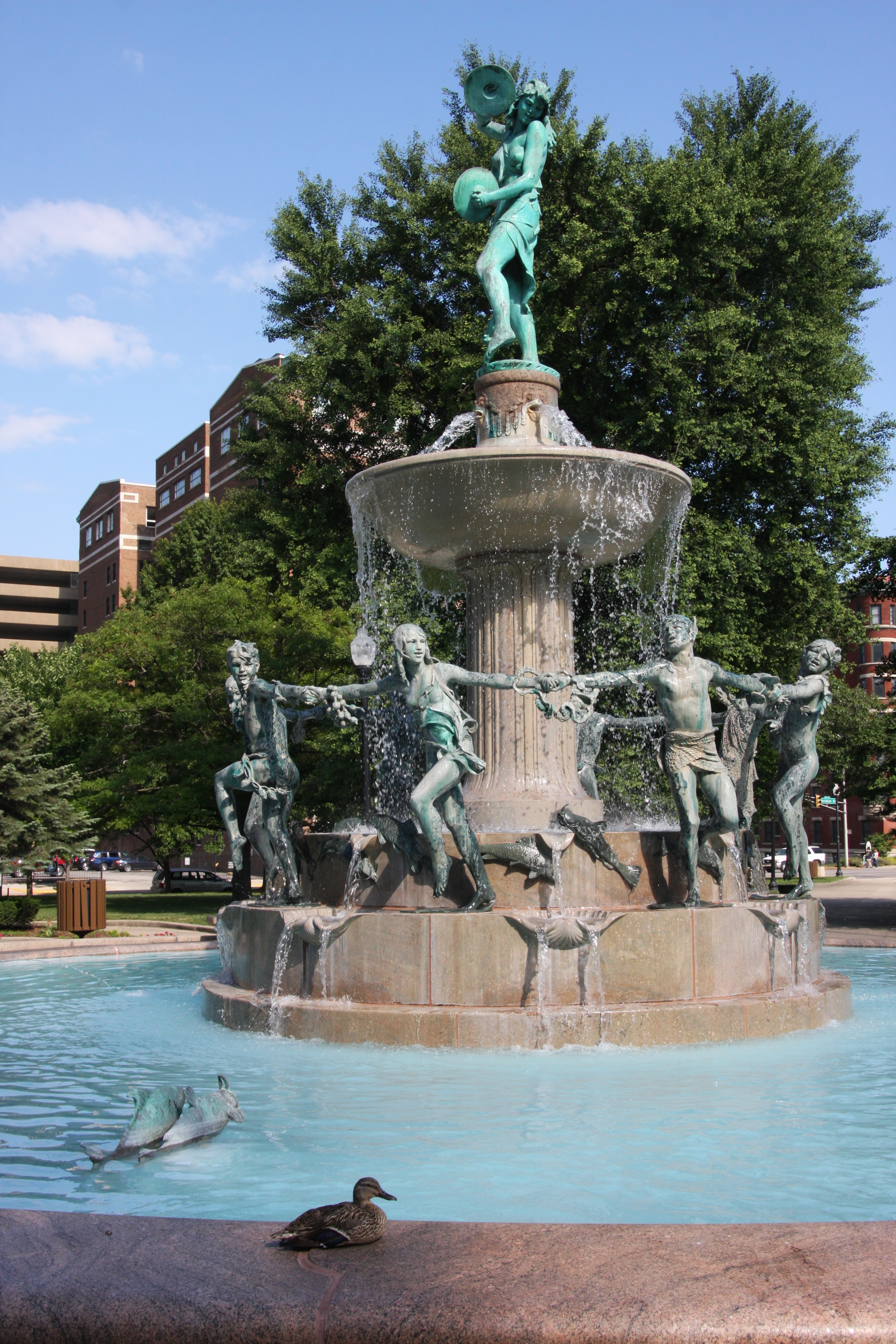
- Depew Memorial Fountain in 2016
- Artist: Alexander Stirling Calder; Karl Bitter; Henry Bacon
- Year: 1915
- Medium: Bronze and granite
- Dimensions: 25 by 45 feet (7.6 m × 13.7 m)
- Location: University Park Indianapolis, Indiana; 39°46′19″N 86°9′25″W
- Owner: City of Indianapolis

Depew Memorial Fountain is a freestanding fountain completed in 1919 and located in University Park in downtown Indianapolis, Indiana, within the Indiana World War Memorial Plaza.

== Description ==
The fountain is composed of multiple bronze figures arranged on a five-tier Stony Creek pink granite base with three basins. The bronze sculptures depict fish, eight children dancing, and a woman on the topmost tier dancing and playing cymbals. The overall dimensions are approximately 25 x 45 x 25 by 45 feet (7.6 m × 13.7 m).

A memorial plaque is located on the south side of the large granite basin. It reads:

Depew Memorial Fountain. A gift to Indianapolis from Emma Ely Depew in memory of her husband Richard Johnson Depew M.D. whose long and honorable life was spent in untiring service to his fellow men.

== Artists ==
- Alexander Stirling Calder (1870–1945, American)
- Karl Bitter (1867–1915, Austrian/American)
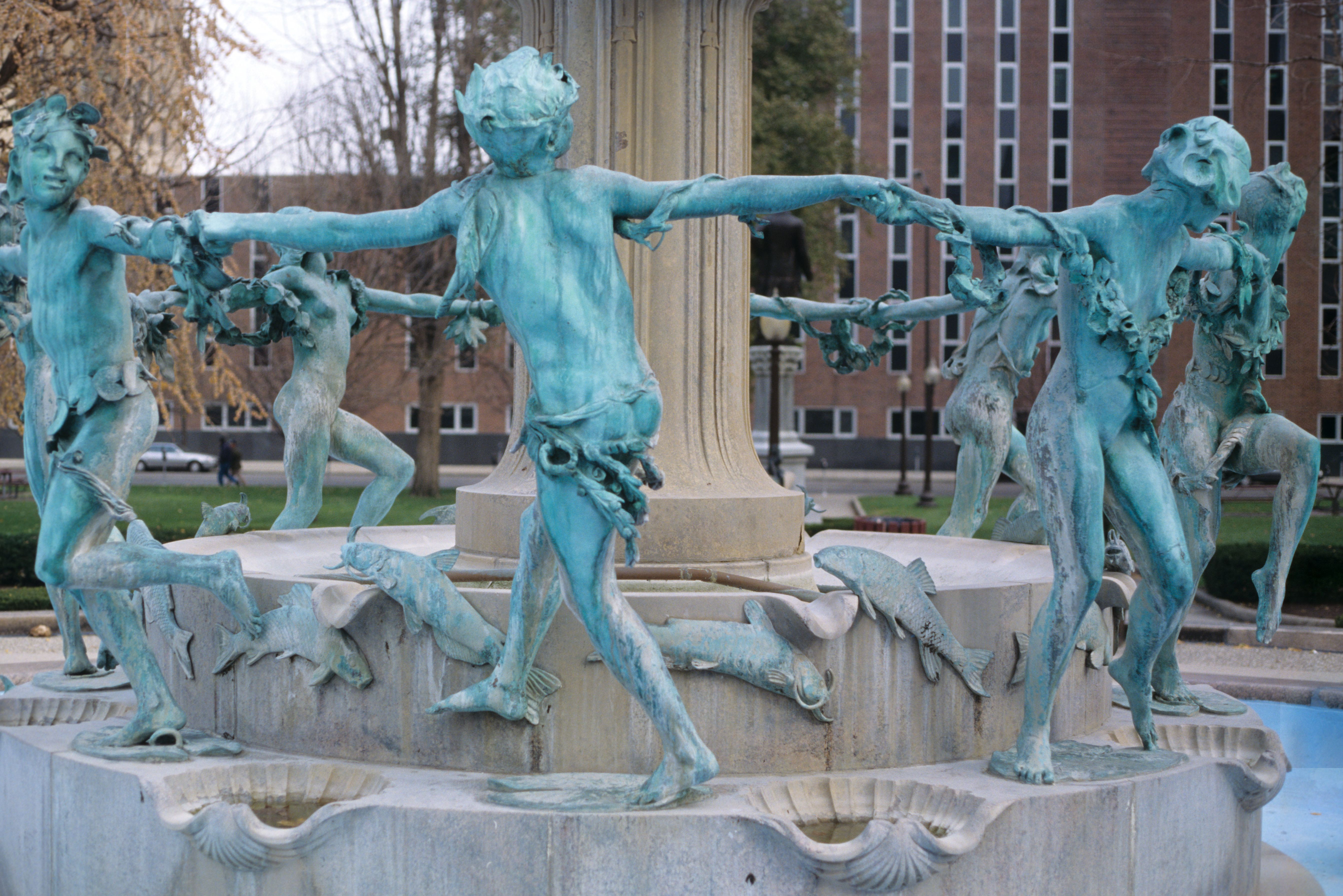
  DePew Memorial Fountain closeup
- Henry Bacon (1866–1924, American)

== History ==
Karl Bitter's maquette for the fountain

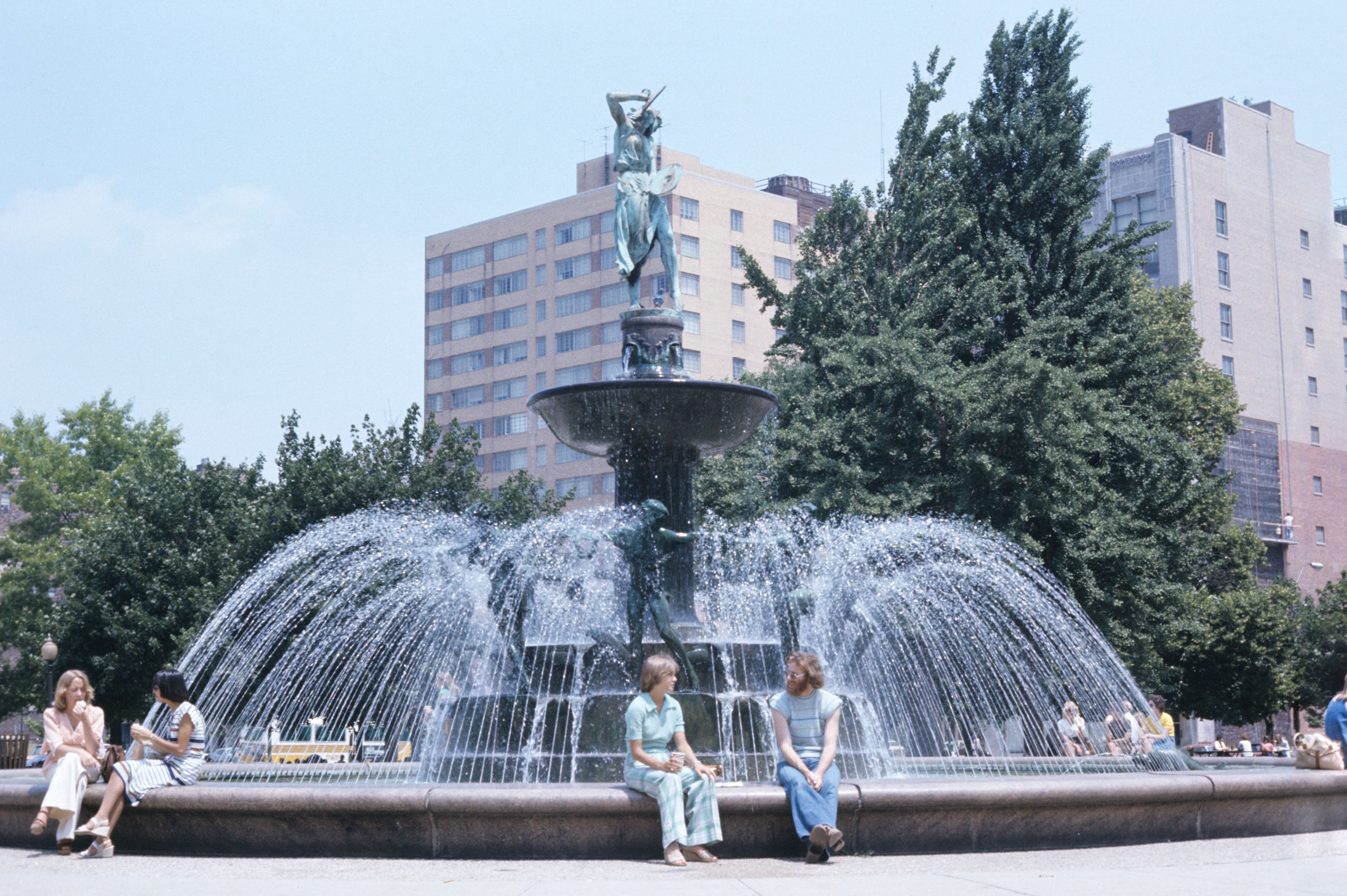
Depew Memorial Fountain in 1977

University Park was redesigned in 1914 by George Edward Kessler for the park and boulevard system he had developed for the city of Indianapolis. Depew Fountain was an original component of the plan and was designed by the sculptor Karl Bitter in the same year.

The Depew Memorial Fountain was commissioned in memory of Dr. Richard J. Depew by his wife, Emma Ely, following Dr. Depew's death in 1887. When Mrs. Depew died in 1913, she had bequeathed $50,000 from her estate to the city of Indianapolis for the erection of a fountain in memory of her husband "in some park or public place where all classes of people may enjoy it."

An information plaque, located on the north side of the fountain, reads:

This fountain is the culmination of work by three noted figures in late-19th-century and early 20th-century public art. The original design was created by Karl Bitter, who was killed in a traffic accident in 1915 before the work could be realized. Following Bitter's overall design, Alexander Stirling Calder created the bronze figures and the fountain. Henry Bacon, a well-known landscape architect, designed the fountain's setting.

In 1926 young women from the Albertina Rasch ballet performed an interpretive dance around the fountain, mimicking the bronze sculptures thereon, to celebrate the 10th anniversary of the fountain.
