= Alexander Stirling Calder =

American sculptor (1870–1945)

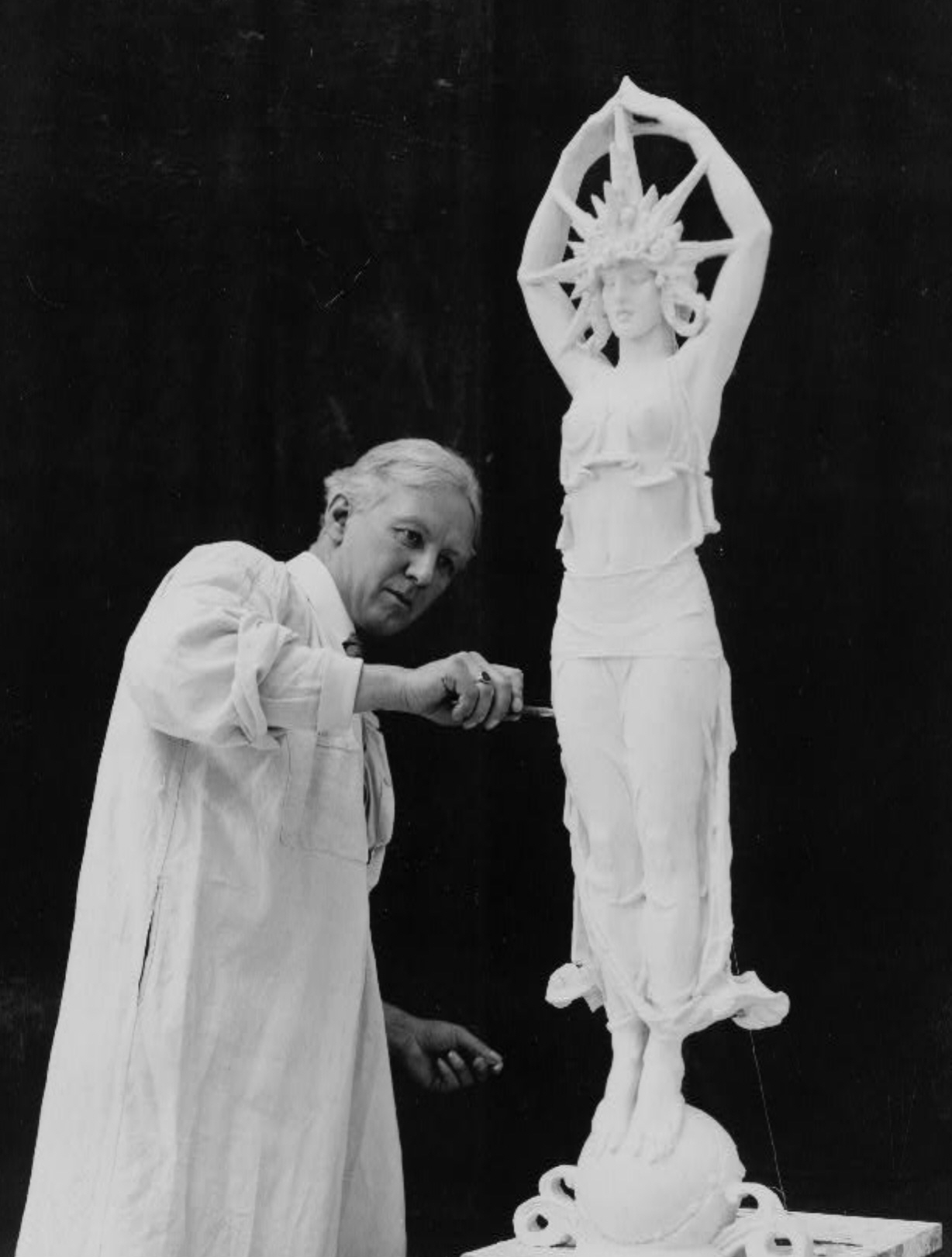
- A. Stirling Calder at work on the Star Maiden (1913). Audrey Munson was the model.
- Born: January 11, 1870; Philadelphia, Pennsylvania, U.S.
- Died: January 7, 1945 (aged 74)
- Resting place: West Laurel Hill Cemetery, Bala Cynwyd, Pennsylvania, U.S.
- Education: Pennsylvania Academy of Fine Arts; Académie Julian; École des Beaux-Arts
- Known for: Sculpture
- Notable work: Samuel Gross Statue; Washington Square Arch; Swann Memorial Fountain; Depew Memorial Fountain; Leif Eriksson Memorial

Alexander Stirling Calder (January 11, 1870 – January 7, 1945) was an American sculptor and art teacher. He won a silver medal at the World's Fair of 1904 for his statue of Philip François Renault and led the sculpture program for the 1915 Panama-Pacific Exposition after the death of Karl Bitter. His notable works include the Samuel Gross statue, George Washington on the Washington Square Arch in New York City, the Swann Memorial Fountain in Philadelphia, the Depew Memorial Fountain in Indianapolis, and the Leif Erikson Memorial in Reykjavík, Iceland.

He taught sculpture at the Pennsylvania Museum School of Industrial Art, the Throop Polytechnic Institute, and the National Academy of Design. His father, Alexander Milne Calder, was a public sculptor best known for the colossal William Penn atop Philadelphia City Hall. His son, Alexander Calder, was one of the most celebrated artists of the twentieth century, most famous for his kinetic mobiles and his monumental stabiles.

== Early life and education ==
Stirling was born on January 11, 1870, in Philadelphia, the oldest of six boys, to sculptor Alexander Milne Calder and Margaret Stirling. He attended city public schools and enrolled at the Pennsylvania Academy of the Fine Arts (PAFA) in Fall 1885, at age 15. He studied under Thomas Eakins for several months, until the teacher's forced resignation in February 1886. He remained at PAFA, studying under Thomas Anshutz and James P. Kelly. Two of his sculptures were accepted for PAFA's 1887 annual exhibition, a rare honor for a student. He worked from 1889 to 1890 as a demonstrator of anatomy at the academy and graduated in 1890.

His father designed and was then in the midst of executing the extensive sculpture program for Philadelphia City Hall. Stirling worked as an apprentice on the project during the summers, and is reported to have modeled an arm for one of the figures. He made his first trip to Europe in Summer 1889, and returned there to study the following year.

Stirling moved to Paris with Charles Grafly in Fall 1890, and studied at the Académie Julian under Henri Michel Chapu. The following year, he was accepted at the École des Beaux-Arts, where he entered the atelier of Alexandre Falguière.

== Career ==
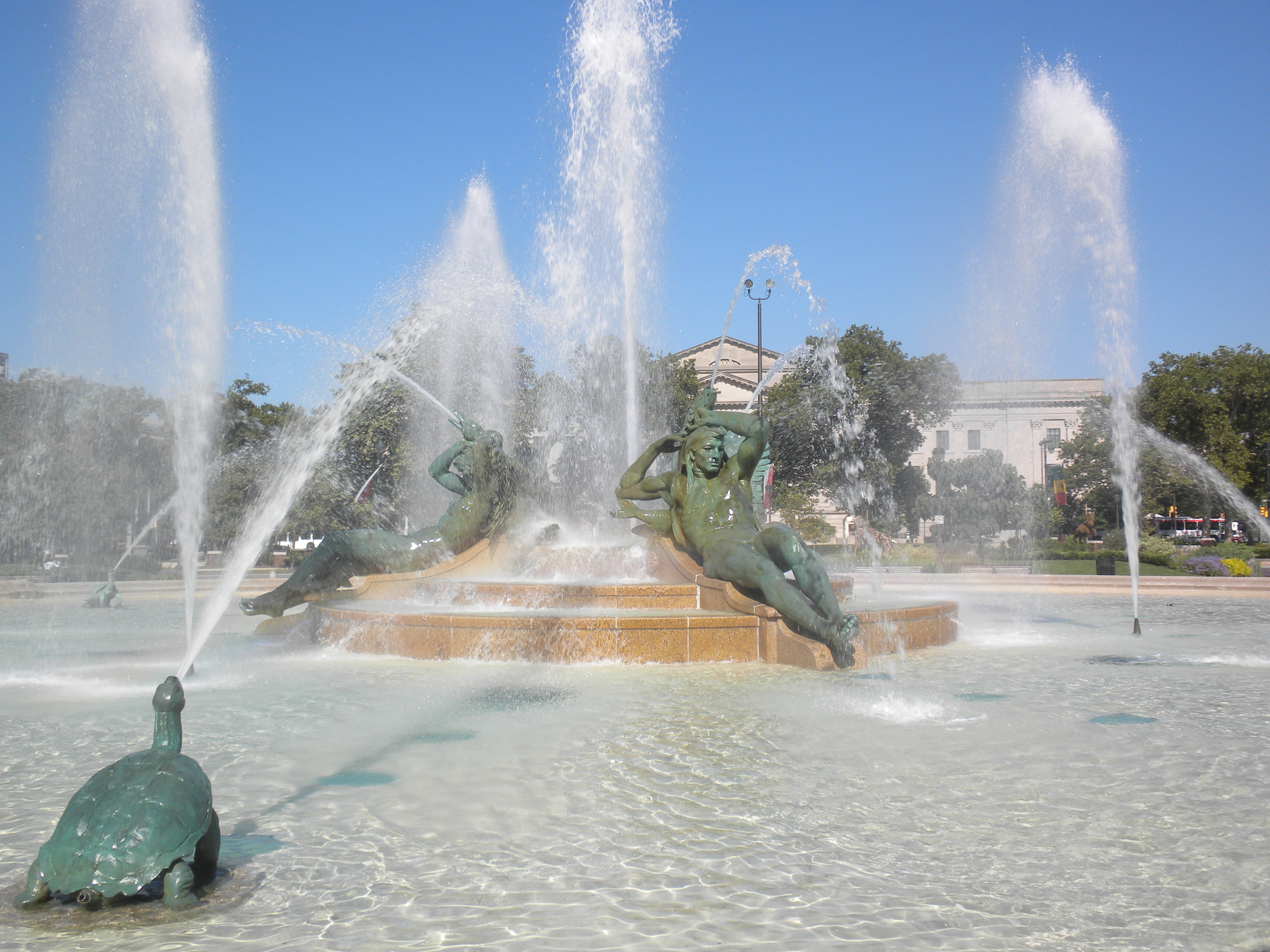
Swann Memorial Fountain in Logan Circle, Philadelphia

In 1892, he returned to Philadelphia and began his career as a sculptor in earnest. His first major commission, won in a national competition, was for the Samuel Gross statue for the National Mall in Washington, D.C. Another early commission was for a set of twelve statues of Presbyterian clergymen for the facade of the Witherspoon Building in Philadelphia.

He worked as an instructor in modeling at the Pennsylvania Museum School of Industrial Art from 1900 to 1906. In 1904, he won a silver medal at the World's Fair of 1904 in St. Louis, Missouri, for his statue of Philip François Renault.

He suffered from tuberculosis and moved to Arizona in 1906 to recover his health. After his health recovered, he moved to Pasadena, California, and his family joined him. In Pasadena, he modeled architectural sculpture for the Throop Polytechnic Institute (now the California Institute of Technology). He returned to the east coast in 1910 and settled in Croton-on-Hudson, New York. He taught at the National Academy of Design from 1910 to 1917 and was elected an academician in 1913.

He was placed in charge of the sculpture program for the 1915 Panama-Pacific Exposition in San Francisco, California, after the death of Karl Bitter. He obtained a studio in New York City and employed the services of model Audrey Munson who posed for him as the model for the Star Maiden statue. For the exposition, Calder completed three massive sculpture groups, The Nations of the East and The Nations of the West, which crowned triumphal arches, and a fountain group, The Fountain of Energy. Following Bitter's sudden death in April 1915, Calder completed the Depew Memorial Fountain in Indianapolis, Indiana.

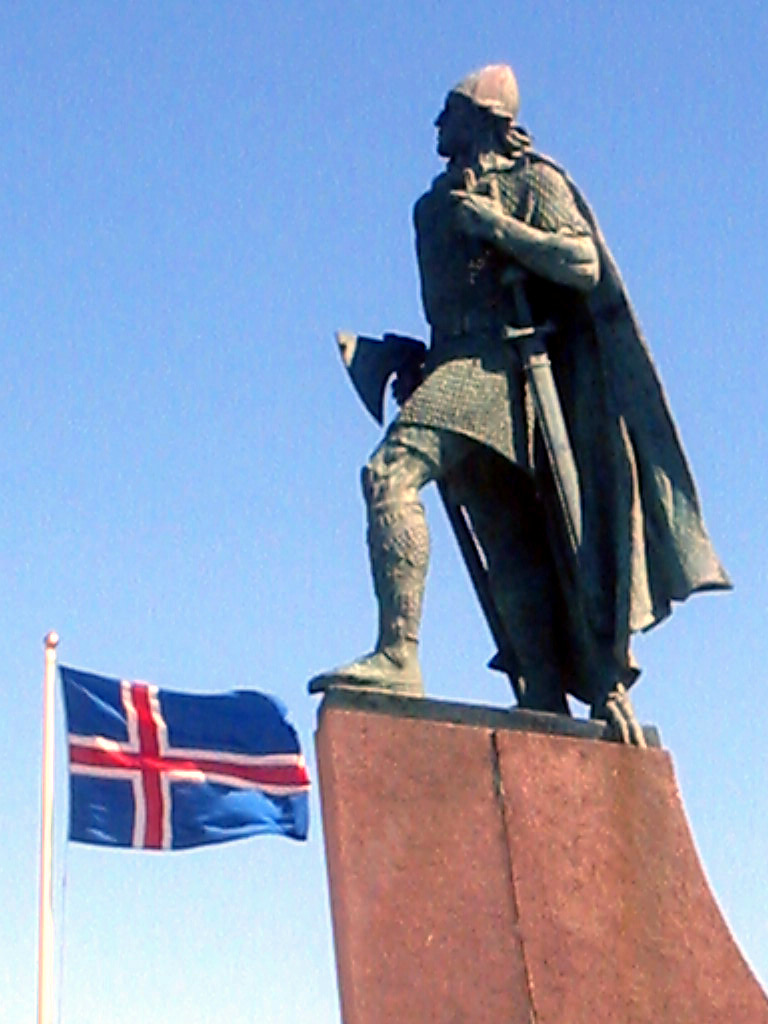
Leif Erikson Memorial, Reykjavík, Iceland

Hermon Atkins MacNeil and Calder were commissioned to create sculptures for the Washington Square Arch in New York City. George Washington as Commander-in-Chief, Accompanied by Fame and Valor (1914–1916) was sculpted by MacNeil; and George Washington as President, Accompanied by Wisdom and Justice (1917–18) by Calder. These are sometimes referred to as Washington at War and Washington at Peace.

He sculpted a number of ornamental works for Villa Vizcaya, the James Deering estate outside Miami, Florida. These included the famous Italian Barge (1917–1919), a stone folly in the shape of a boat, projecting into Biscayne Bay.

He taught at the Art Students League of New York from 1918 to 1922.

Two of his major commissions of the 1920s were the Swann Memorial Fountain in Logan Circle, and the architectural sculpture program for the University of Pennsylvania Museum of Archaeology and Anthropology.

He was one of a dozen sculptors invited to compete in Oklahoma's Pioneer Woman statue competition in 1926–27, which was won by Bryant Baker. In 1927, he was also commissioned by the Berkshire Museum to sculpt the woodwork and fountain of the museum's Ellen Crane Memorial Room in Pittsfield, Massachusetts.

In 1929, he won the national competition for a monumental statue of Leif Eriksson, to be the gift of the United States to Iceland in commemoration of the 1000th anniversary of the Icelandic Parliament.

== Personal life ==
Stirling married portrait painter Nanette Lederer on February 22, 1895, and they lived in Philadelphia for the first decade of their marriage. They had two children. Their daughter, Margaret Calder Hayes, was born in Paris, and their son, the famed sculptor Alexander Calder, was born in Philadelphia.

Stirling died on January 7, 1945, and was interred at West Laurel Hill Cemetery in Bala Cynwyd, Pennsylvania.

== Legacy ==
Works from Alexander Stirling Calder are on display at Calder Gardens, a cultural institution in Philadelphia dedicated to experiencing the works of Alexander Calder. The institution resides on the Benjamin Franklin Parkway, not far from Stirling's own Swann Memorial Fountain and Milne's William Penn (Calder).

== Selected works ==
Title	Image	Year	Location/GPS Coordinates	Material	Height	Notes
Dr. Samuel D. Gross Memorial		1895–1897	Thomas Jefferson University, Philadelphia, Pennsylvania; 39.94794167°N 75.15820278°W	bronze	111 in (280 cm)	Posthumous portrait of Dr. Gross, based on Thomas Eakins's 1875 painting. From 1897 to 1970, the statue stood on the National Mall in Washington, D.C.:
Bust of Major General John F. Hartranft		1898	Smith Memorial Arch, West Fairmount Park, Philadelphia, Pennsylvania; 39.9775°N 75.206667°W	bronze	36 in (91 cm)	Gen. Hartranft was a U.S. Medal of Honor recipient for the First Battle of Bull Run.
Class of 1892 Drinking Fountain (The Scholar and the Football Player)		1900	Quadrangle Dormitories, University of Pennsylvania, Philadelphia, Pennsylvania; 39.950806°N 75.197306°W,	bronze	21 in (53 cm)	Located under the arch at the top of the North Steps.
Overmantel frieze: The Boar Hunt		c.1900	Keil Hall, Mercersburg Academy, Mercersburg, Pennsylvania; 39.8270°N 77.8991°W	carved oak		Modeled by Calder, carved by John J. Maene.
Sewell Cross; Major General William Joyce Sewell Monument		1901	Harleigh Cemetery, Camden, New Jersey; 39.923889°N 75.089722°W	green granite	20 ft (6.1 m)	Modeled by Calder, carved by Leland & Hall Company. Gen. Sewell was a U.S. Medal of Honor recipient for the Battle of Chancellorsville. Calder was awarded PAFA's 1905 Walter Lippincott Prize for the Sewell Cross.
Man Cub: "Sandy" Calder at Age 3		1901–02	Pennsylvania Academy of the Fine Arts, Philadelphia, Pennsylvania	plaster (original lost)	45 in (110 cm)	PAFA purchased Calder's plaster original in 1905, and used it to make a 1906 bronze cast. The plaster was either returned to Calder or lost (by 1941). A 1922 bronze cast is at the Metropolitan Museum of Art.
Sundial		1903–1905	Fairmount Park Horticultural Center, West Fairmount Park, Philadelphia, Pennsylvania; 39.983150°N 75.212600°W	marble	56.5 in (144 cm)	Located in the Sunken Gardens:
Missouri: The Queen of Rivers		1904	Louisiana Purchase Exposition, St. Louis, Missouri	plaster		Calder won a silver medal for his sculpture at the 1904 World's Fair.
Philip François Renault		1904	Louisiana Purchase Exposition, St. Louis, Missouri	plaster		Calder won a silver medal for his sculpture at the 1904 World's Fair.
Calder Cross; William Hickman Harte Memorial Cross		c.1905	Chippiannock Cemetery, Rock Island, Illinois; 41.481667°N 90.577778°W	granite	102 in (260 cm)	Master William Hickman Harte was a Union naval officer who died in the June; 17, 1862 Battle of Saint Charles, following the sinking of the USS Mound City. Fifty years later, Harte's son located his Arkansas grave, and commissioned this cenotaph for their home town cemetery.
Henry Charles Lea Monument		1911	Laurel Hill Cemetery, Philadelphia, Pennsylvania; 40.0042°N 75.1902°W	bronze		Henry Charles Lea was a noted historian. The seated figure is Clio, the Muse of History:
Stretching Girl		c.1911	National Academy of Design, Manhattan, New York City	bronze	36 in (91 cm)	Calder's NAD diploma piece, presented following his election as an Academician in 1913. Robert Henri painted Calder's NAD diploma portrait. Another bronze cast is at the Crystal Bridges Museum of American Art in Bentonville, Arkansas.
An American Stoic: Portrait of Najinyankte		1912	Rhode Island School of Design Museum, Providence, Rhode Island	bronze	28 in (71 cm)	A standing Sioux man wrapped in a blanket.
Star Maiden		1913–1915	Oakland Museum, Oakland, California	bronze	51 in (130 cm)	The Star Maidens were balustrade figures surrounding the Court of the Universe:
Fountain of Energy (destroyed)		1913–1915	Panama–Pacific International Exposition, San Francisco, California	staff		"Energy, the Lord of the Isthmian Way, rides grandly upon the earth. His outstretched arms have severed the lands and let the waters pass. Upon his mighty shoulders stand Fame and Glory, heralding the coming of a conqueror. Energy, the Power of the Future, the Superman, approaches."
Fountain of Energy (destroyed)		1913–1915	Panama–Pacific International Exposition, San Francisco, California	staff		The globe featured a large reclining female figure with the head of a lioness, The Eastern Hemisphere, and a large reclining male figure with the head of a bull, The Western Hemisphere:
Fountain of Energy (destroyed)		1913–1915	Panama–Pacific International Exposition, San Francisco, California	staff		4 sculpture groups were clustered around the globe: The Atlantic Ocean, The Pacific Ocean, The North Sea, The South Sea
Fountain of Energy (destroyed)		1913–1915	Panama–Pacific International Exposition, San Francisco, California	staff		12 Nerieds riding dolphins were spaced around the pool's perimeter:
The Nations of the East (destroyed)		1913–1915	atop The Arch of the Rising Sun, Panama–Pacific International Exposition, San Francisco, California	staff		
The Nations of the West (destroyed)		1913–1915	atop The Arch of the Setting Sun, Panama–Pacific International Exposition, San Francisco, California	staff		Crowning figure: Enterprise
The Nations of the West (destroyed)		1913–1915	atop The Arch of the Setting Sun, Panama–Pacific International Exposition, San Francisco, California	staff		Central figure: The Mother of Tomorrow
Depew Memorial Fountain		1915–1917	University Park, Indianapolis, Indiana; 39.771944°N 86.156944°W	bronze	Crowning figure: 90 in (230 cm)	Calder completed this commission following sculptor Karl Bitter's 1915 death. Bitter's 1915 maquette for the fountain:
George Washington as President, Accompanied by Wisdom and Justice		1917–18	Washington Square Arch, Washington Square, Manhattan, New York City; 40.73099°N 73.99805°W	marble	12 ft (3.7 m)	Sometimes called Washington at Peace. Hermon Atkins MacNeil modeled Washington at War (1914–16). The pair flank the north side of the arch.
The Great Stone Barge (Delights and Terrors of the Sea)		1917–1919	"Villa Vizcaya" (James Deering estate), Coconut Grove, Florida; 25.743753°N 80.210232°W	limestone		Calder's barge sculptures were criticized for being "excessively erotic." The eroded sculptures were used to cast concrete replicas in 1981.
Garden sculpture		1917–1919	"Villa Vizcaya" (James Deering estate), Coconut Grove, Florida; 25.743753°N 80.210232°W	limestone		
The Little Dear with the Tiny Black Swan (Leda and the Swan)		1918–1921	Denver Art Museum, Denver, Colorado	bronze	28 in (71 cm)	A 60.25 in (153.0 cm) version is a promised gift to Crystal Bridges Museum of American Art.
Swann Memorial Fountain (Fountain of Three Rivers)		1920–1924	Logan Circle, Philadelphia, Pennsylvania; 39.95795°N 75.170819°W	bronze	Central figures: 11 ft (3.4 m)	Wilson Eyre, architect. The female allegorical figures represent the Schuylkill River and the Wissahickon Creek. The male Lenni Lenape figure represents the Delaware River.
Naiad with Tragic Mask; Model for a Fountain		c.1920	Pennsylvania Academy of the Fine Arts, Philadelphia, Pennsylvania	painted plaster	16.25 in (41.3 cm)	A bronze cast is at the Reading Public Museum in Reading, Pennsylvania. A larger plaster version is at the Montclair Art Museum in Montclair, New Jersey.
Scratching Her Heel		1921	Metropolitan Museum of Art, Manhattan, New York City	bronze	12 in (30 cm)	Another bronze cast is at the Telfair Museum of Art in Savannah, Georgia.
The Last Dryad		1921	Philadelphia Museum of Art, Philadelphia, Pennsylvania	plaster	70.5 in (179 cm)	A 1926 bronze cast is at the University of California, Berkeley.
Shakespeare Memorial (Tragedy and Comedy, Hamlet and the Fool)		1923–1926	In front of the Free Library of Philadelphia, Logan Square, Philadelphia, Pennsylvania; 39.9595°N 75.171°W	bronze	91.5 in (232 cm)	Gilbert McIlvaine, architect Touchstone and Prince Hamlet: Another bronze cast is at Brookgreen Gardens.
Head of George Bellows		1925	Conner-Rosenkranz Gallery, Manhattan, New York City	plaster	14.5 in (37 cm)	A bronze cast is at the New York Historical Society.
Our Lady and the Holy Child (A Study in French Gothic Style)		1926	St. Mary's of Redford Church, Detroit, Michigan	marble	7 ft (2.1 m)	Located in a niche behind the High Altar.
Pioneer Woman (Self-Reliant)		1926–27	Woolaroc Museum, Bartlesville, Oklahoma; 36.642339°N 96.095964°W	bronze	40 in (100 cm)	One of twelve bronze models created by American sculptors for the 1927; Pioneer Woman statue competition. Bryant Baker won the commission. His heroic-sized Pioneer Woman was dedicated in 1930, in Ponca City, Oklahoma. Calder received a $10,000 honorarium for his model.
Bust of John James Audubon		1927	Hall of Fame for Great Americans, Bronx Community College, Bronx, New York City; 40.858611°N 73.914444°W	bronze		
Leif Eriksson Memorial		1929–1932	Hallgrímskirkja Cathedral, Reykjavík, Iceland	bronze	139 in (3.5 m)	Gift of the United States commemorating the 1000th anniversary of the founding of the Althing, Iceland's parliament. The statue appeared on a U.S. postage stamp and an Icelandic coin. Calder's plaster model is at the Smithsonian American Art Museum. A bronze cast is at the Mariners' Museum in Newport News, Virginia. View from the cathedral's tower, looking west to the Atlantic Ocean:
Cruel Nature: Self-Portrait at Age 60		c.1930	National Portrait Gallery, Washington, D.C.	terra cotta	12.5 in (32 cm)	
Robert Henri: The Painter-Teacher with the Gift of Friendship (Posthumous Bust of Robert Henri)		1934	Pennsylvania Academy of the Fine Arts, Philadelphia, Pennsylvania	plaster (unlocated)	32 in (81 cm)	Calder and Henri (1865–1929) had been friends since 1885, when both were first-year students at PAFA. Calder's widow had a bronze cast made of the bust in 1947, which she donated to PAFA.
Posthumous Bust of John Singer Sargent		c.1934	Bronx Community College, Bronx, New York City	plaster		
Introspection		c.1935		plaster		
Continental Post Rider		1936	William Jefferson Clinton Federal Building, Washington, D.C.	aluminum	51.5 in (131 cm)	
Bust of William Penn		1936	Hall of Fame for Great Americans, Bronx Community College, Bronx, New York City; 40.858611°N 73.914444°W	bronze		
Nature's Dance (The Dance of Life)		1938	Brookgreen Gardens, Murrells Inlet, South Carolina; 33.520556°N 79.099722°W	Indiana limestone	80 in (200 cm)	
Bishop William White		1940	Washington Memorial Chapel, Valley Forge, Pennsylvania; 40.104528°N 75.437944°W	bronze		The Right Reverend White was the first bishop of the American Episcopal Church. Calder's last major commission.
Bust of Winston Churchill		1943		plaster		Inscription: "HAVE FAITH, HAVE HOPE, DELIVERANCE IS SURE." JULY 14, 1941.

=== Architectural sculpture ===
- Twelve cast stone figures of Presbyterian clergymen, Witherspoon Building, Philadelphia, Pennsylvania, 1898–99, Joseph Miller Huston, architect.
  - Six of the figures were removed in 1961, and relocated to the garden of the Presbyterian Historical Society.
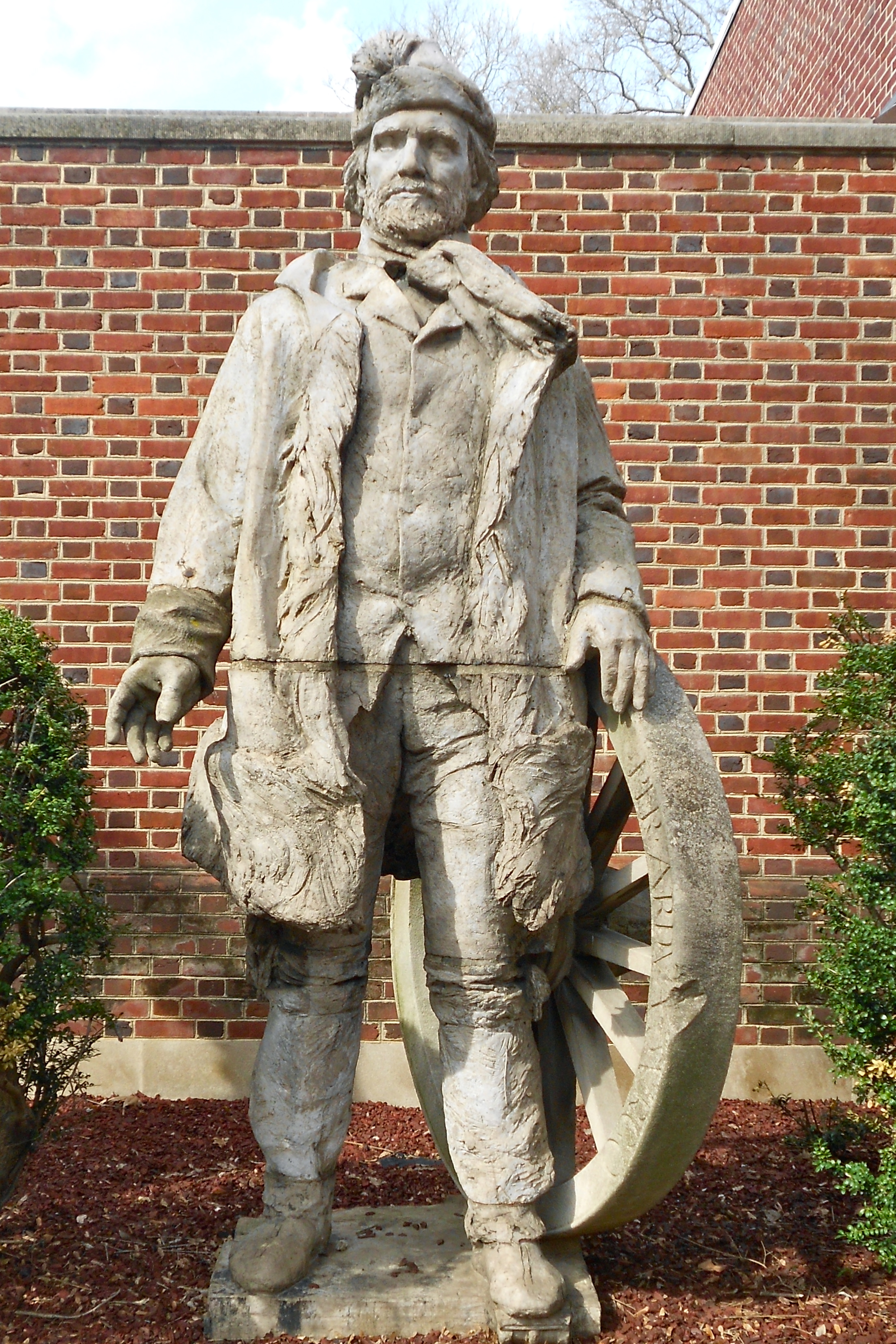
Reverend Marcus Whitman

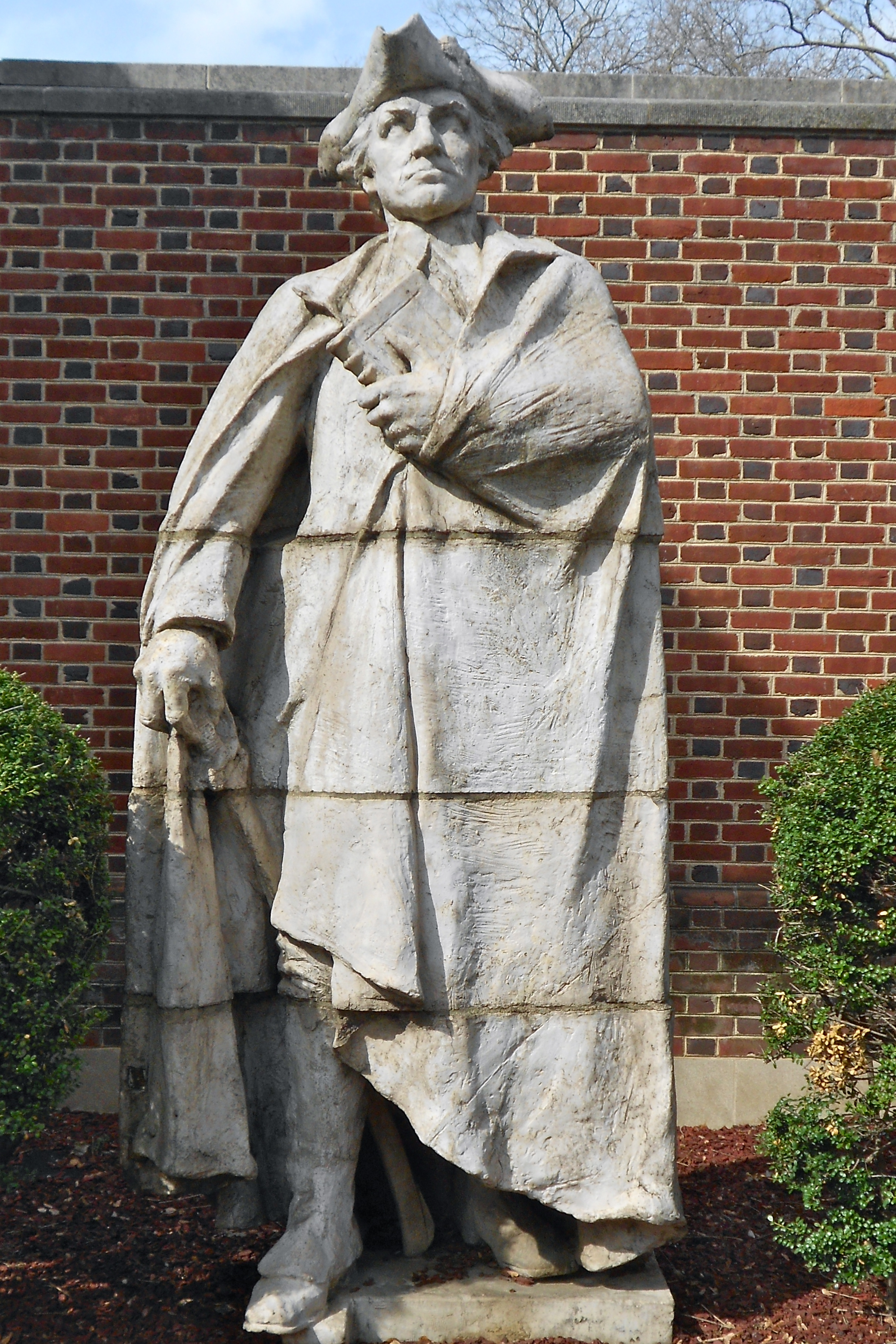
Reverend James Caldwell

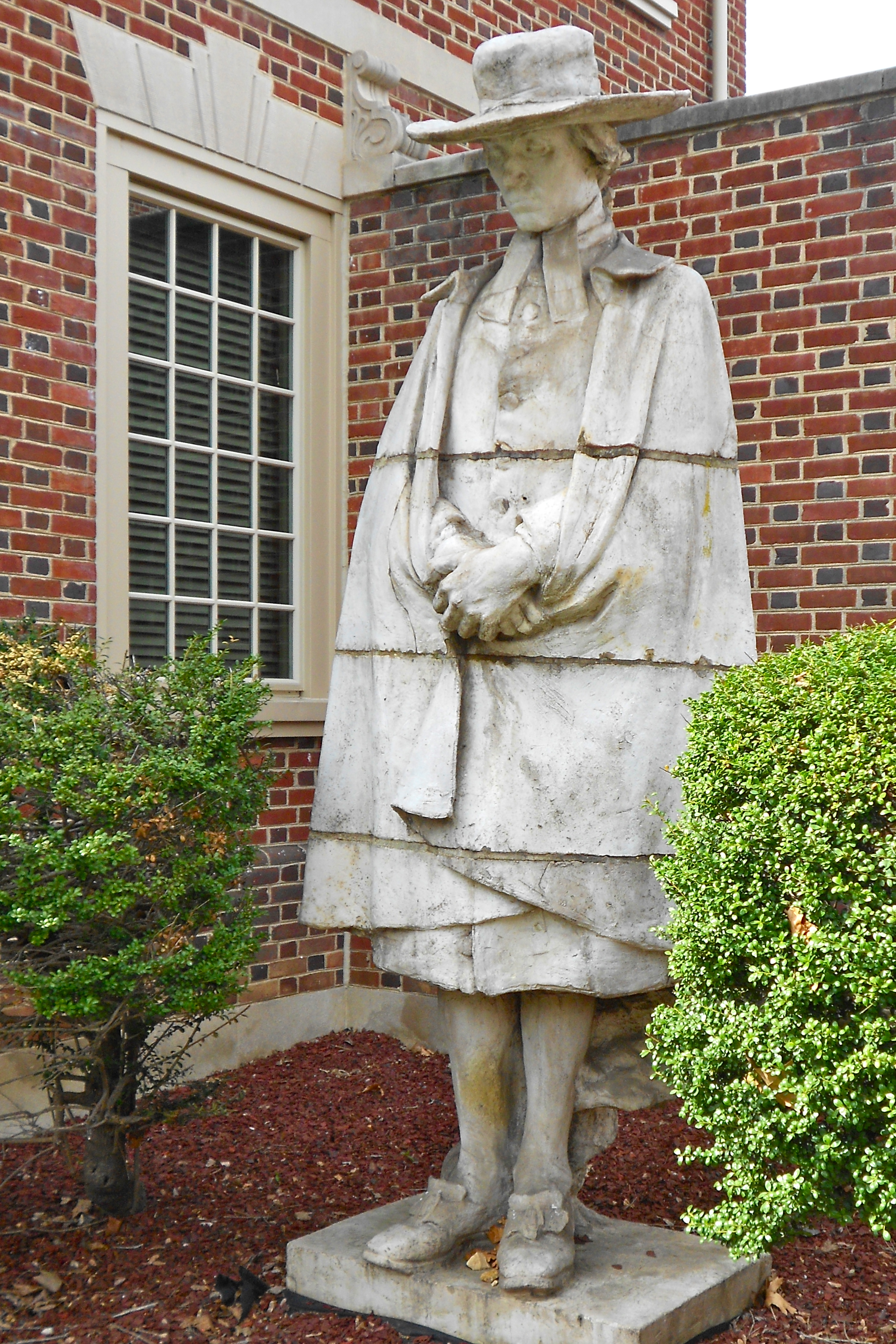
Reverend Samuel Davies

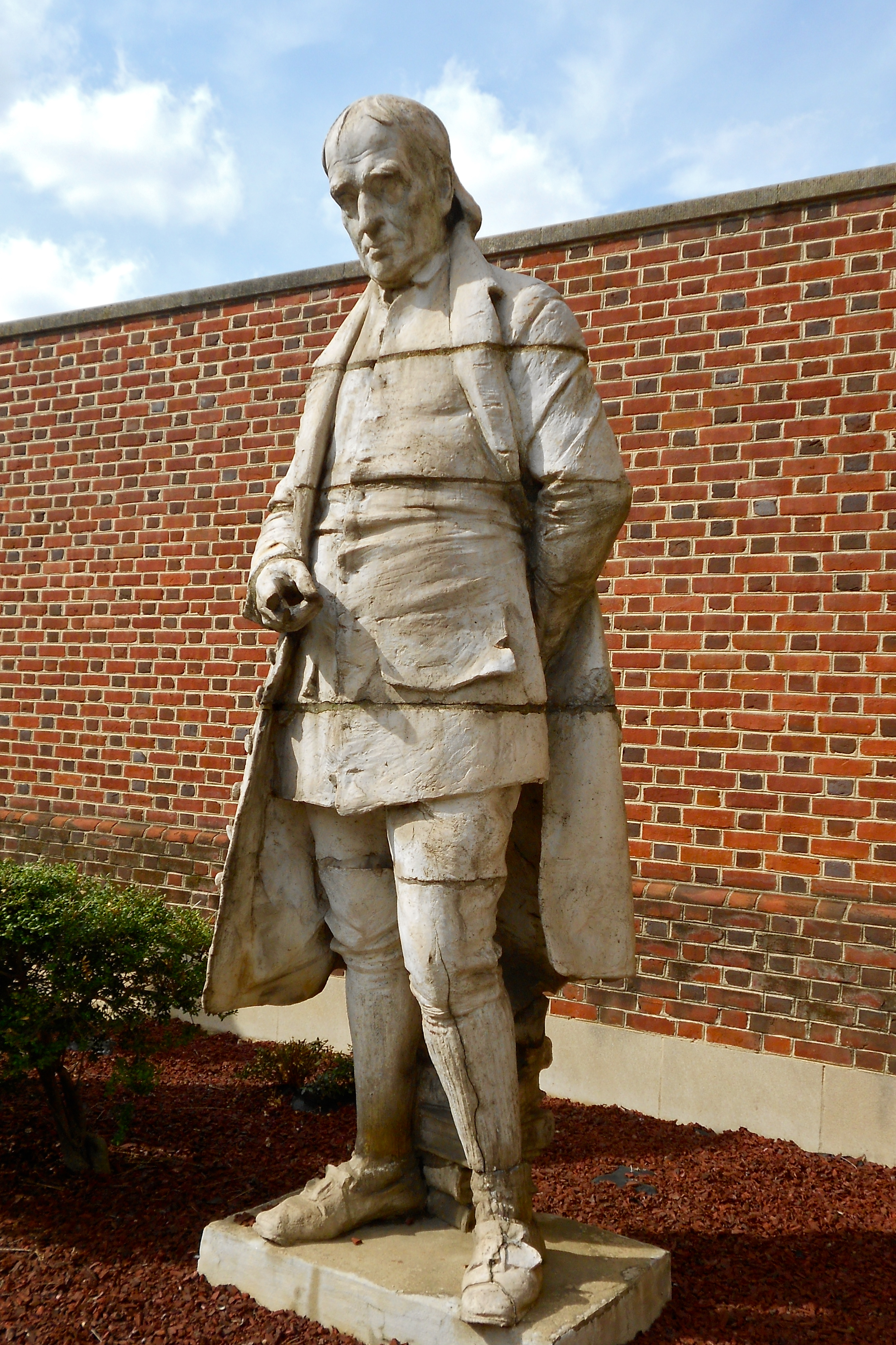
Reverend John McMillan

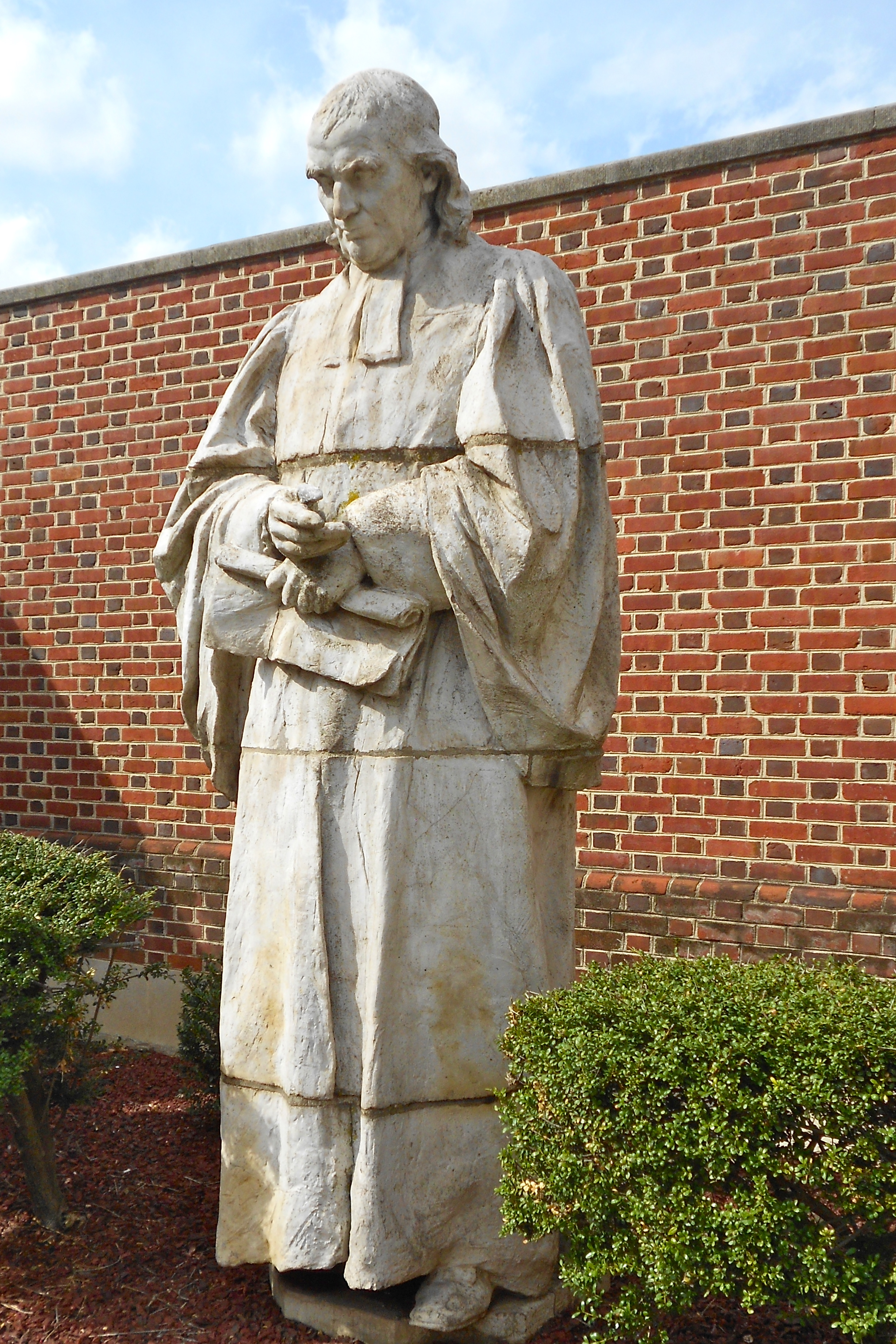
Reverend John Witherspoon

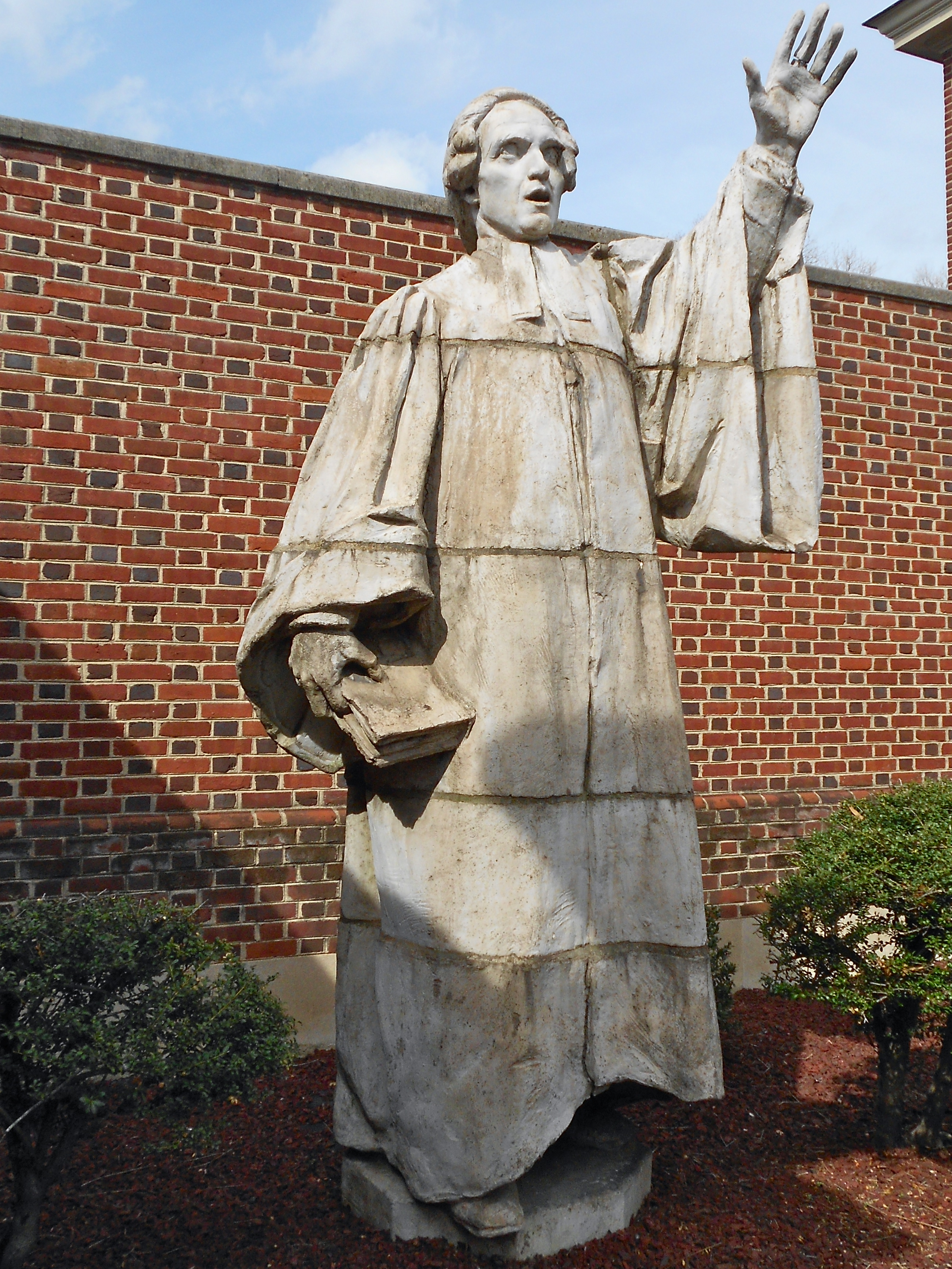
Reverend Francis Makemie
- Six spandrel figures, cast concrete, Throop Polytechnic Institute (now California Institute of Technology), Pasadena, California, 1906–1909, Myron Hart & Elmer Grey, architects.
  - Nature and Art, Energy and Law, Science and Imagination
- Oakland Civic Auditorium, Oakland, California, 1914, John J. Donovan, architect.
  - The Riches of the Earth – Seven terra cotta, half-domed friezes within the arched entrances.Category:Riches of the Earth (1915) by Alexander Stirling Calder – Wikimedia Commons
- Missouri State Capitol, Jefferson City, Missouri, 1924, Tracy and Swartwout, architects.
  - South Frieze, limestone, 6 ft (1.8 m) x 138 ft (42 m), depicts Missouri history in 13 bas relief panels. The frieze flanks the tops of the central portico's columns and continues behind them.
  - North Frieze, limestone, bas relief panels depict Native Americans and Europeans. The frieze flanks the tops of the central columns and continues inside the curved portico.
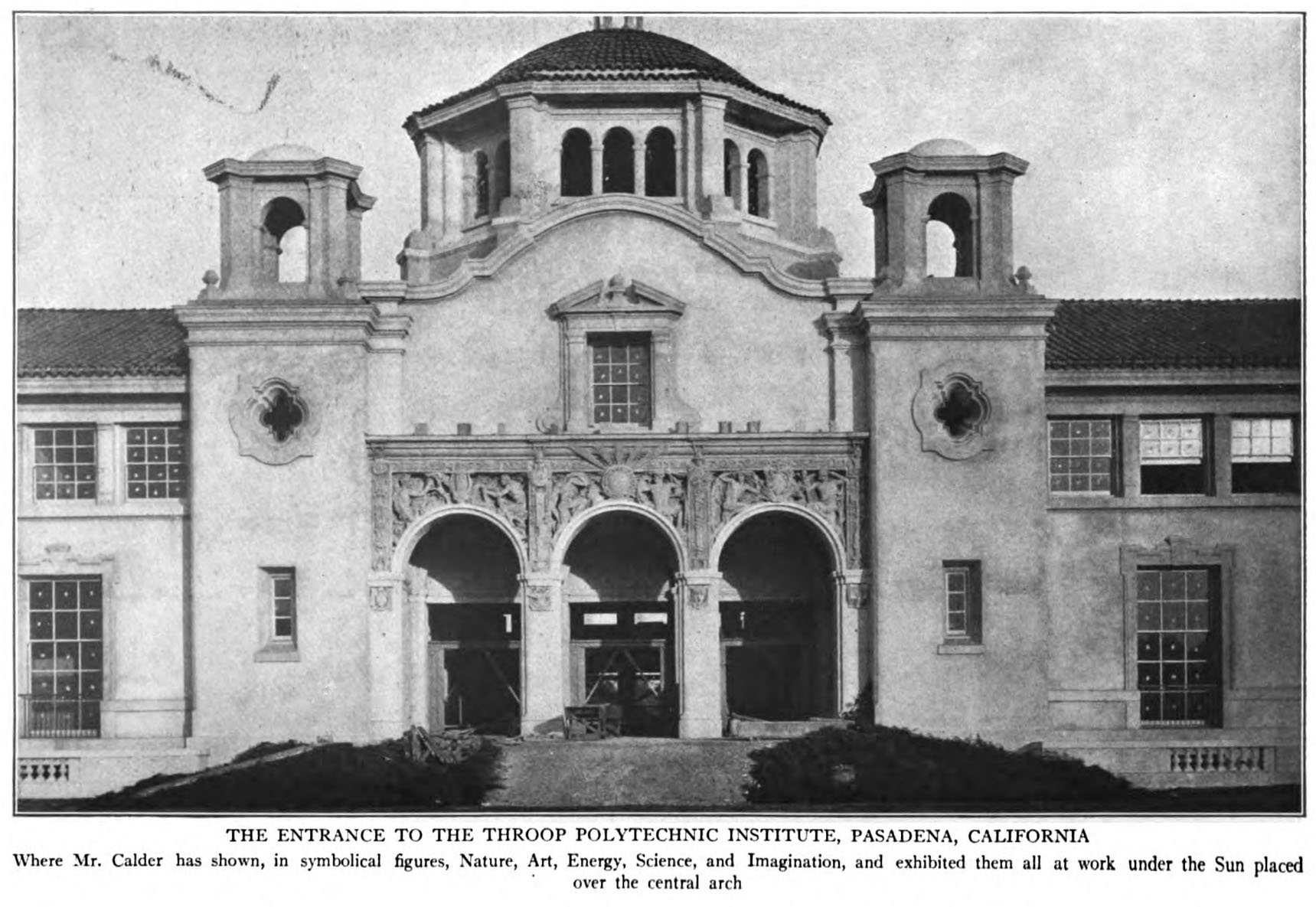
Throop Polytechnic Institute, c.1910.

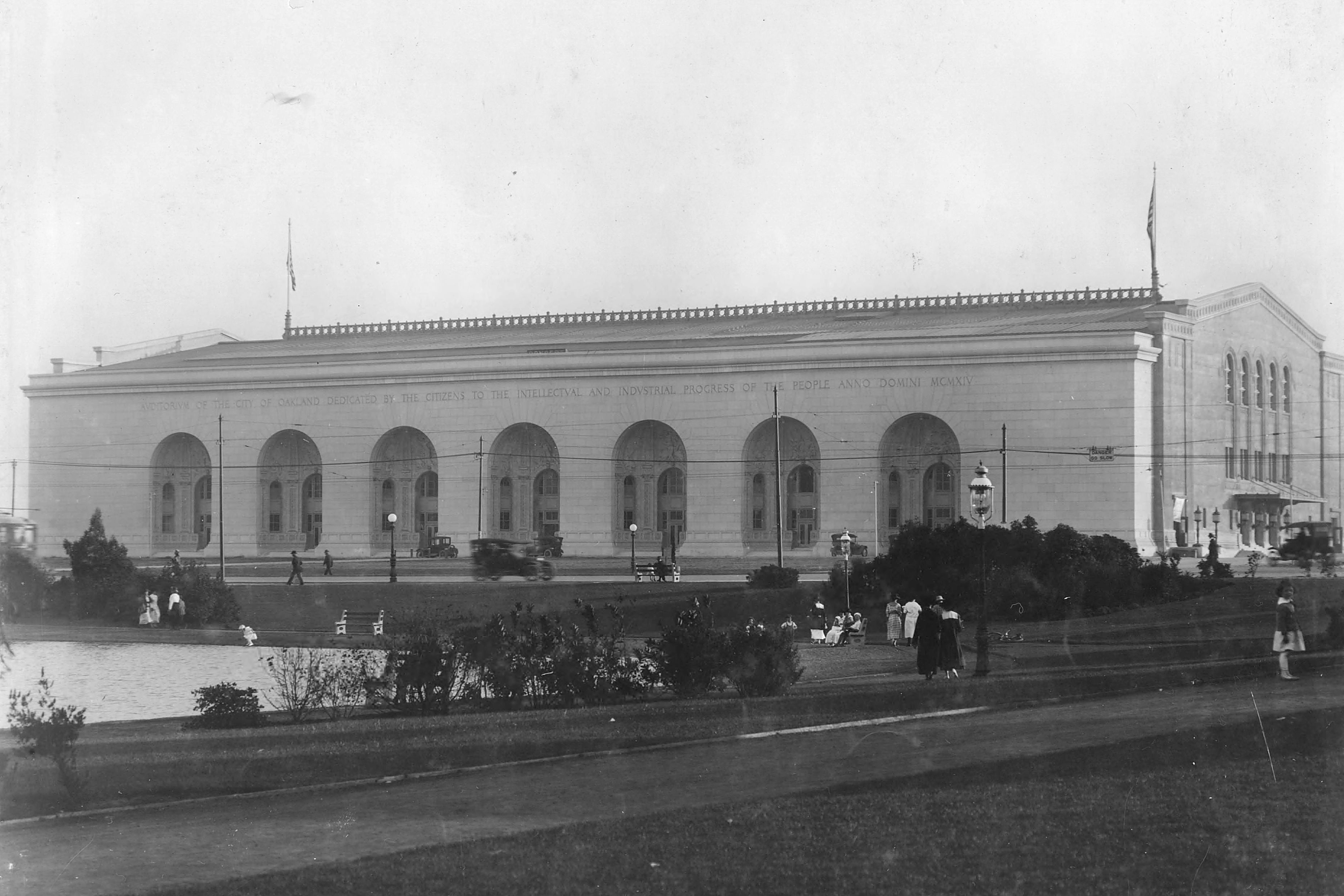
Oakland Civic Auditorium, c.1917

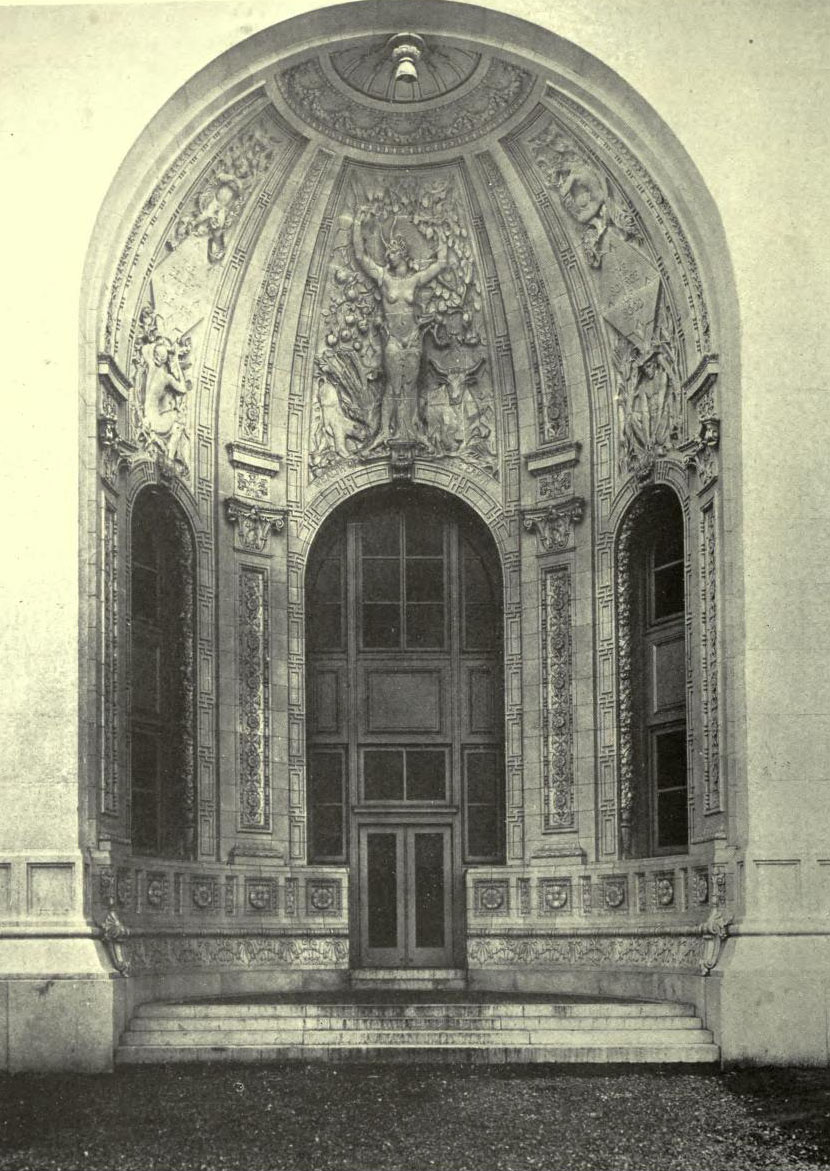
Half-domed frieze

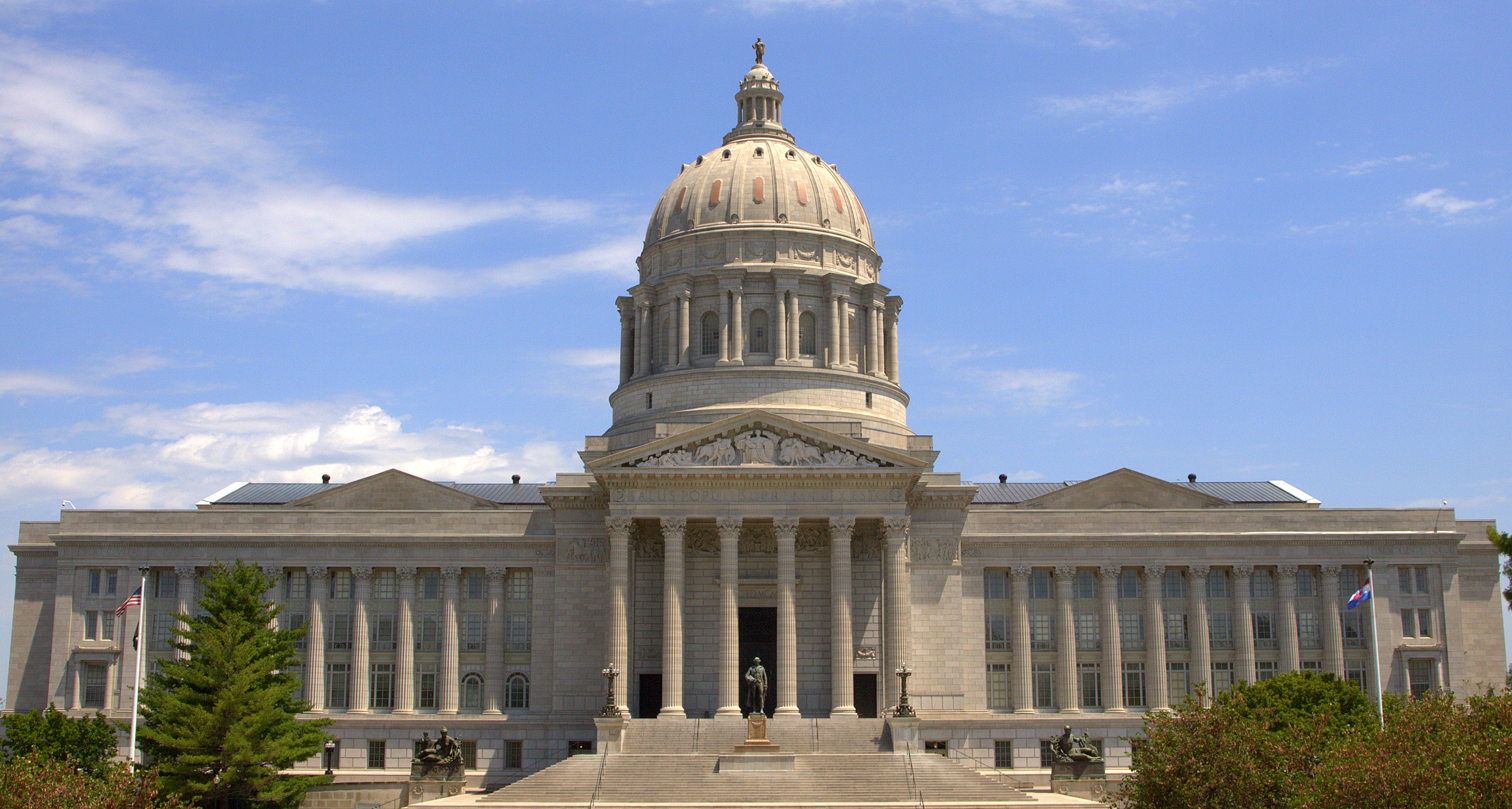
Missouri State Capitol, south façade.

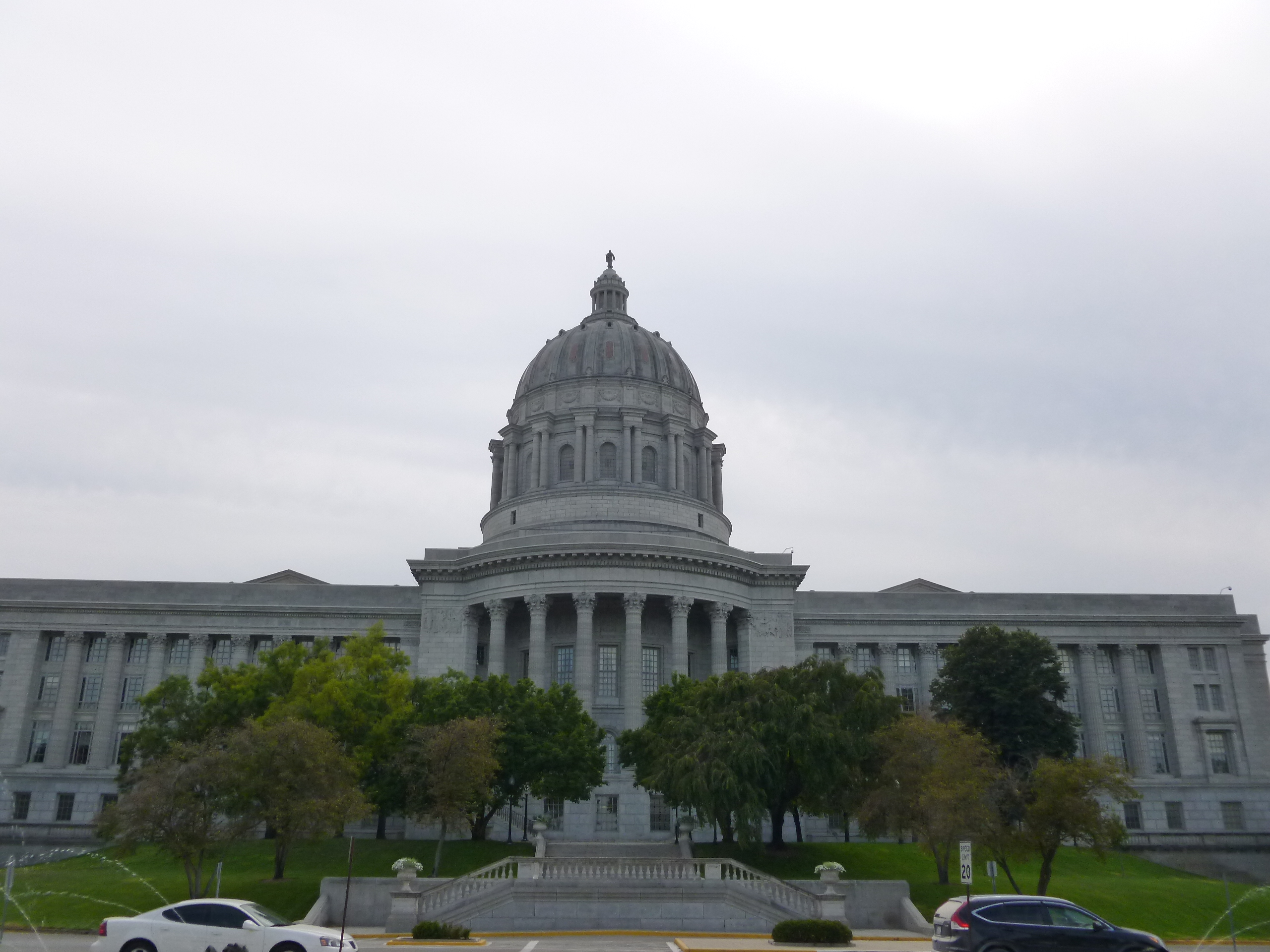
Missouri State Capitol, north facade.
- Four figures of famous actresses, marble, I. Miller Building, Broadway and West 46th Street, Manhattan, New York City, 1927–1929:
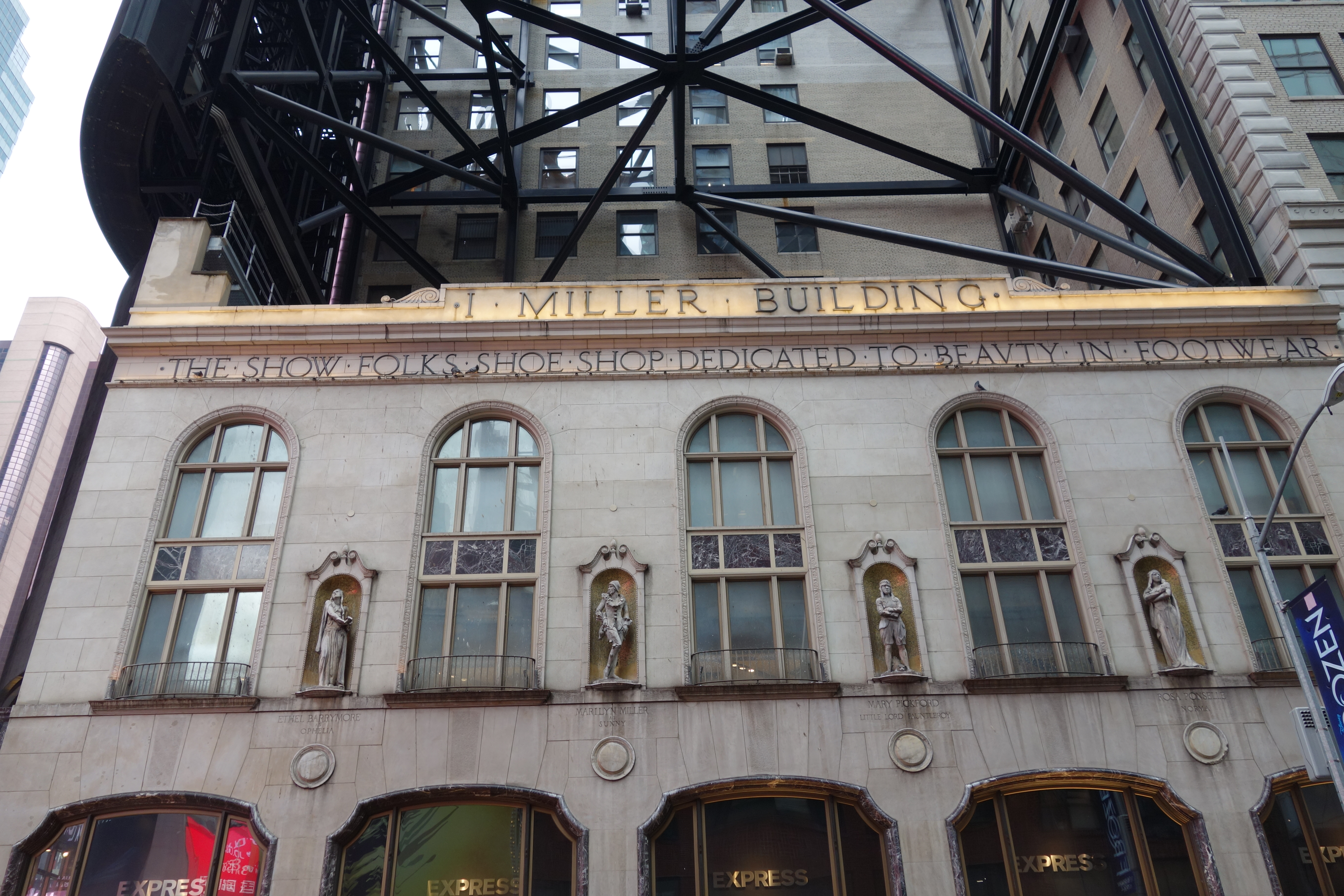
I. Miller Building facade

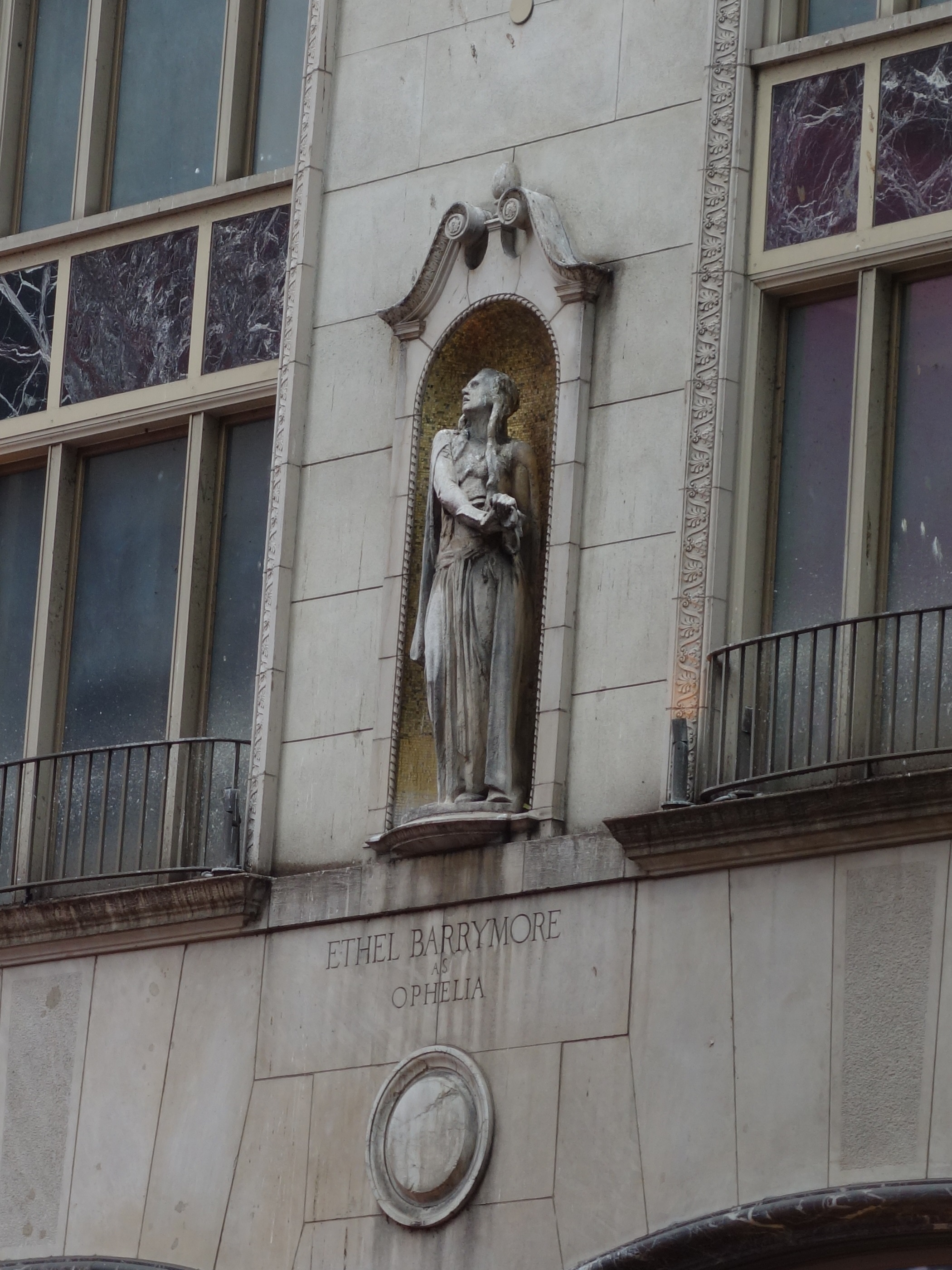
Ethel Barrymore as Ophelia

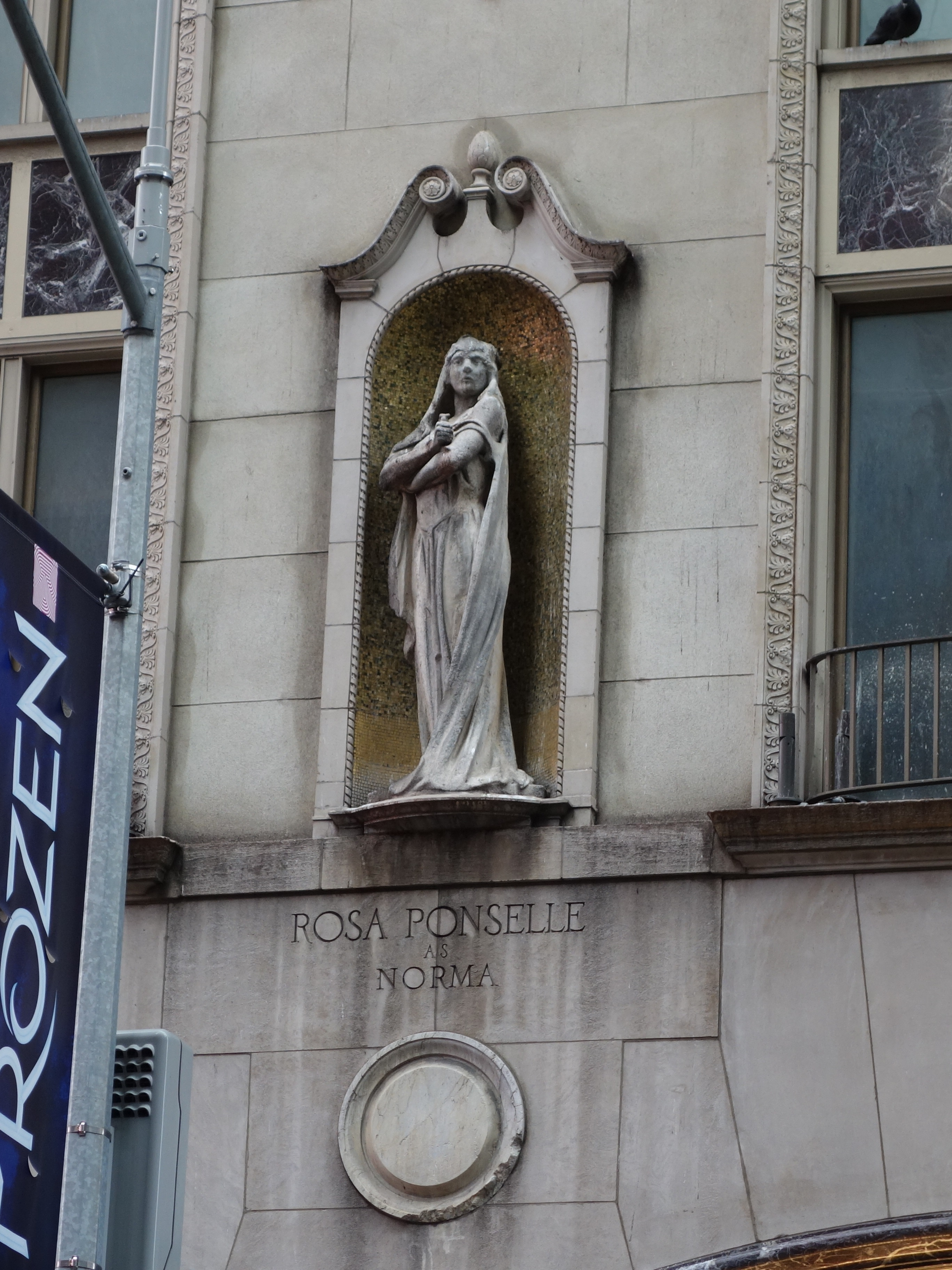
Rosa Ponselle as Norma

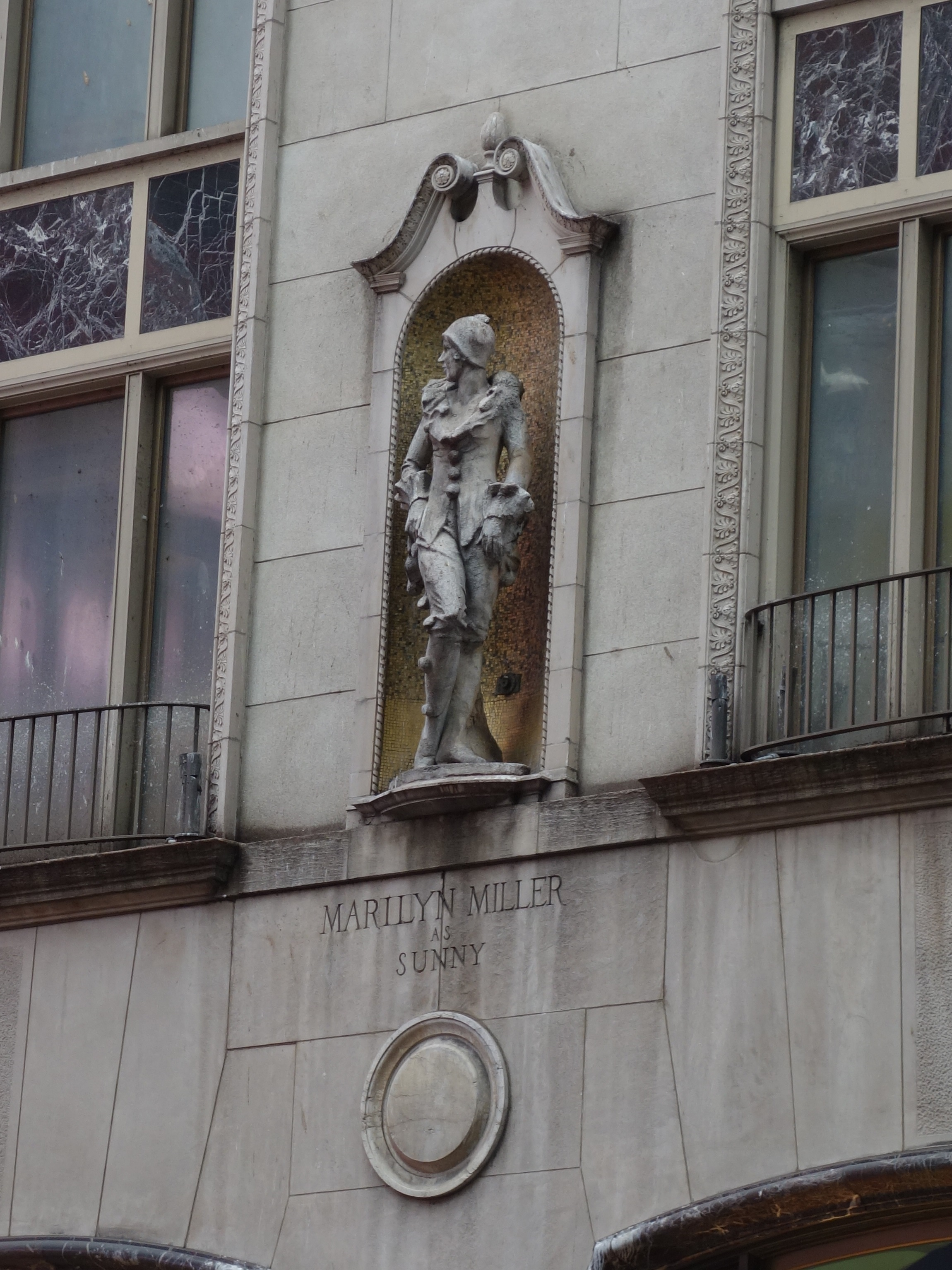
Marilyn Miller as Sunny

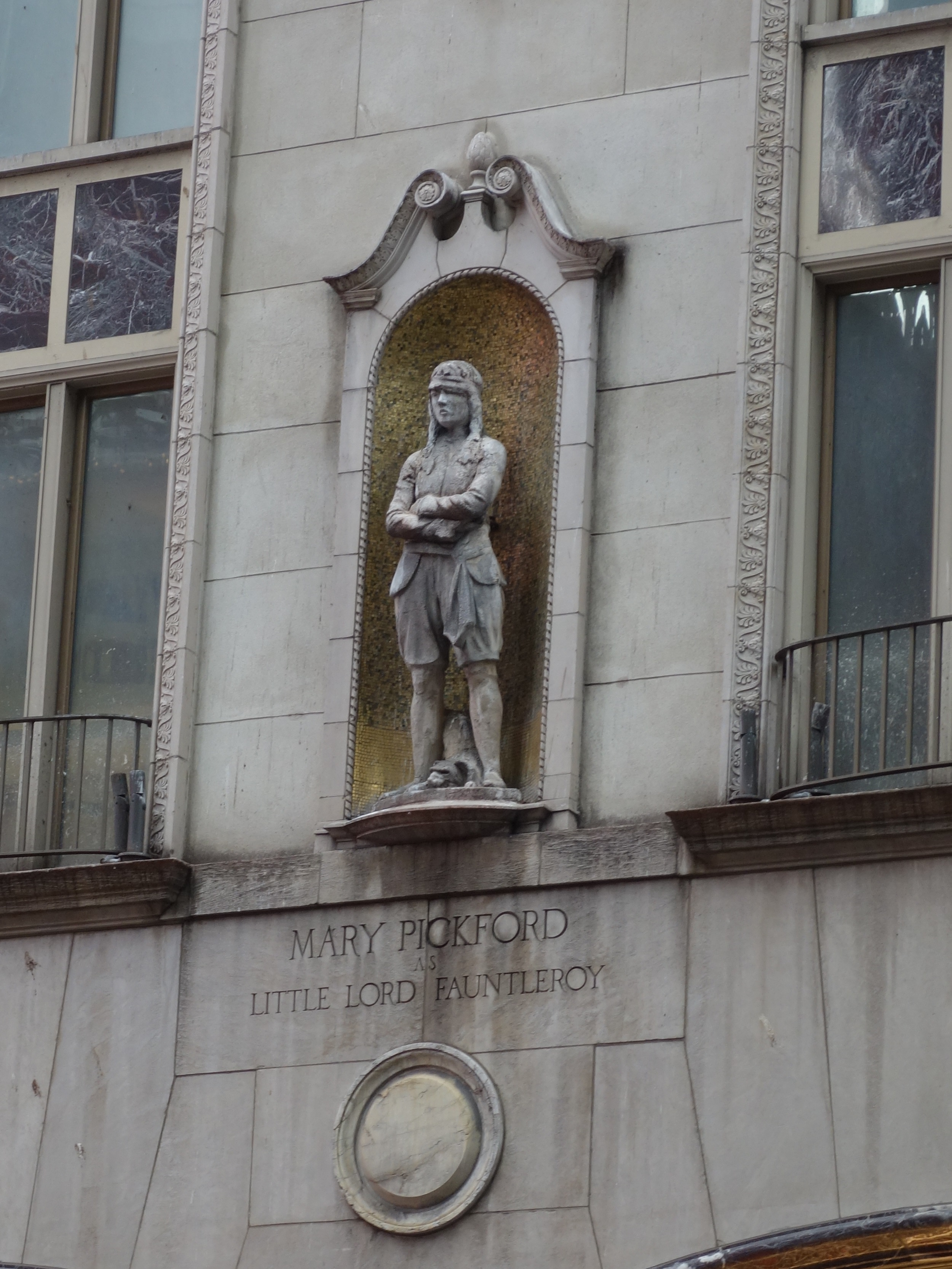
Mary Pickford as Little Lord Fauntleroy

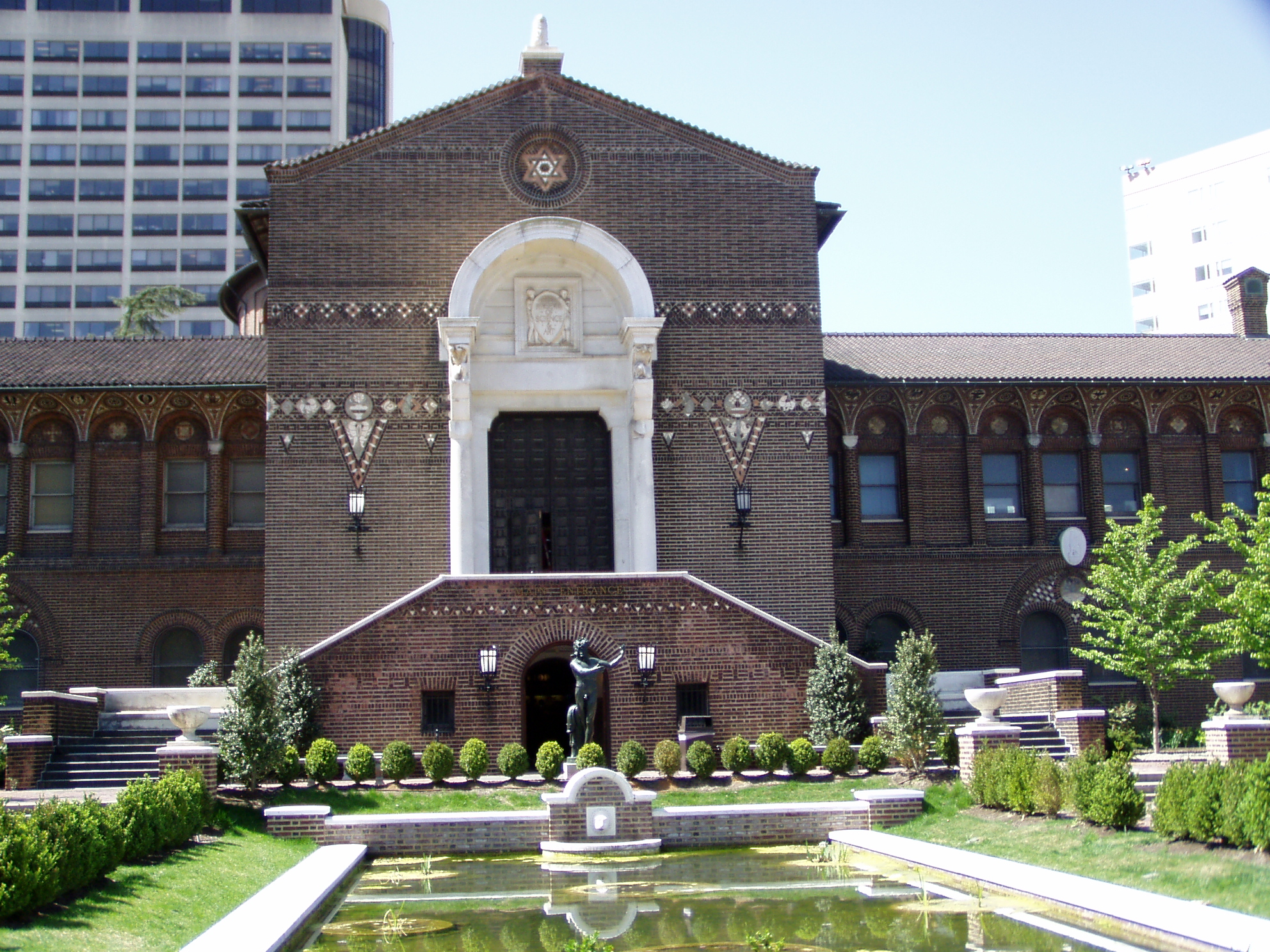
University of Pennsylvania Museum of Archaeology and Anthropology

- Sculpture program for University of Pennsylvania Museum of Archaeology and Anthropology, Philadelphia, Pennsylvania, completed 1931, Wilson Eyre, Frank Miles Day, and Cope & Stewardson, architects:
  - Lion's Head Fountain (1920s).
  - Peacock doorway (1920s).
  - Youth doorway (1920s).
  - Gateposts (1920s): Asia, Africa, Europe, America

=== Medallions ===
- Life as a Dance (c.1938), Metropolitan Museum of Art, Manhattan, New York City
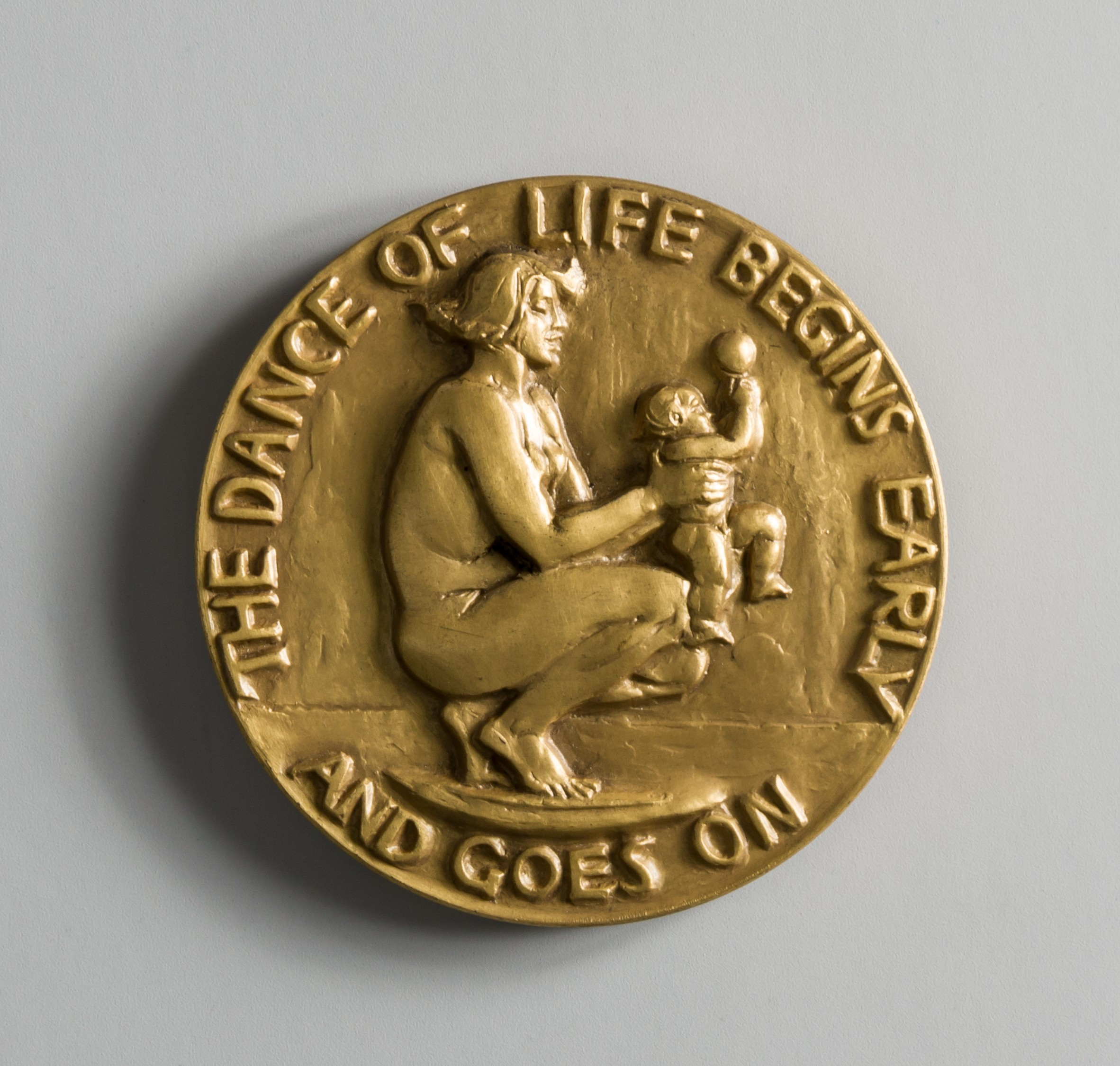

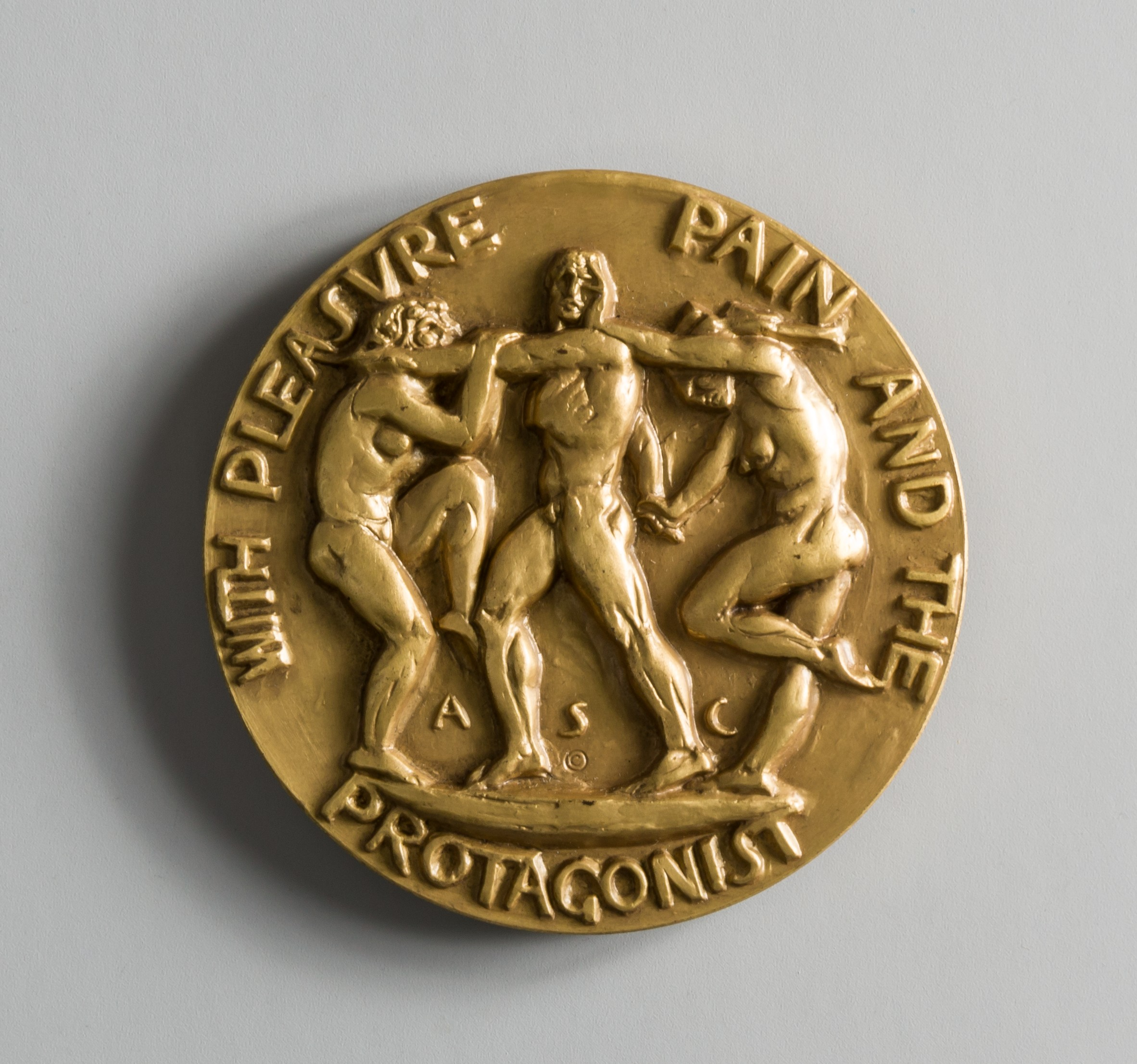
