= Samuel Gross (Calder) =

Sculpture by Alexander Stirling Calder

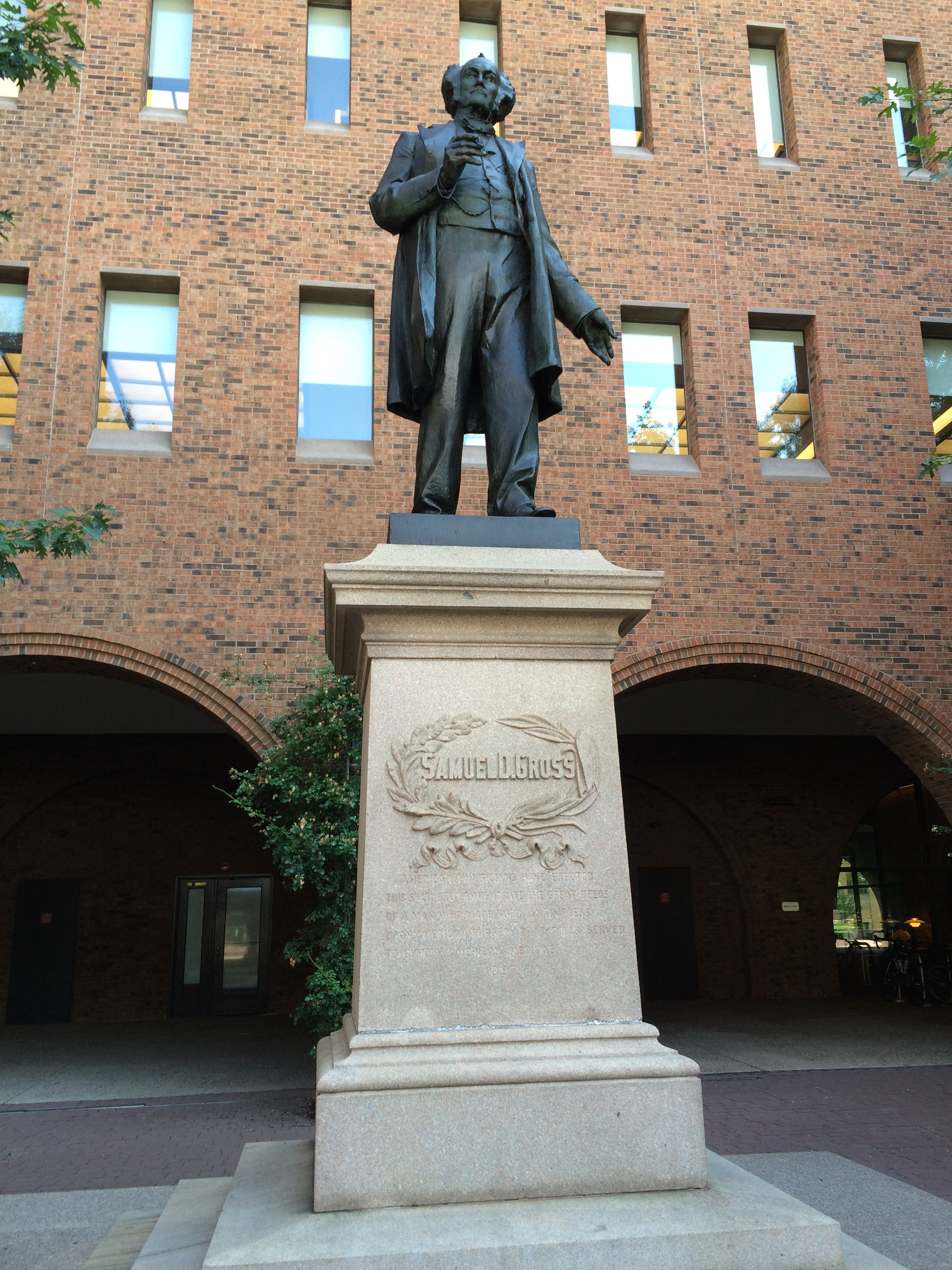
- Artist: Alexander Stirling Calder
- Year: 1897
- Type: Bronze
- Dimensions: 280 cm × 120 cm × 91 cm (111 in × 48 in × 36 in)
- Location: Philadelphia; 39.94806°N 75.15825°W
- Owner: Thomas Jefferson University

Samuel Gross (1897) is a bronze statue by sculptor Alexander Stirling Calder that was created as a monument to the American surgeon Dr. Samuel D. Gross (1805–1884). It was commissioned for and originally installed at the Army Medical School in Washington, D.C., on what is now the National Mall.

In April 1970, it was relocated to the campus of Jefferson Medical College (now Thomas Jefferson University) in Philadelphia, Pennsylvania. It currently stands on the Sidney and Ethal Lubert Plaza, within the square bordered by 10th, Walnut, 11th and Locust Streets.

== History ==
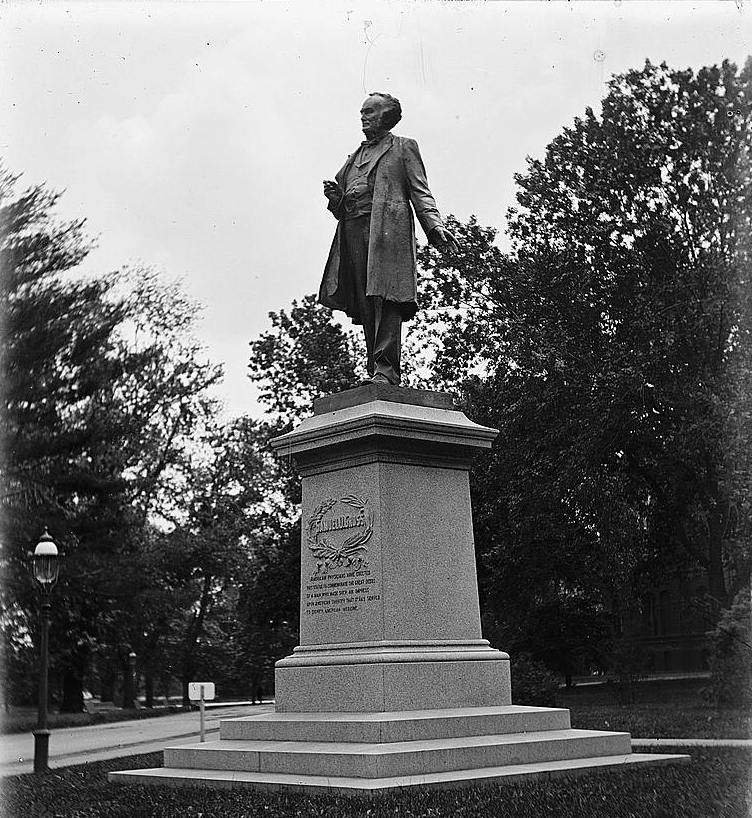
Statue in its original location, beside the Army Medical School in Washington, D.C.

Dr. Gross was considered the greatest American surgeon of his time.He trained more than a generation of surgeons at Jefferson Medical College, and was the author of A Manual of Military Surgery (1861), the military field surgery manual used by the Union Army during the Civil War (and subsequently used by the Confederate States Army).

He later served as president of the American Medical Association and was a founder and the first president of the American Surgical Association.

=== Creation of the statue ===
The formal proposal for a statue of Dr. Gross originated at the September 24, 1891 business meeting of the ASA. By the end of 1892, more than $6,000 had been raised from members of the ASA and the Jefferson Medical College Alumni Association. Members of the AMA also were solicited for contributions:

Mr. Geo. Keil of Philadelphia is in Chicago this week, representing the S. D. Gross Monument Fund, and will call on the leading members of the profession in this city. Twelve thousand dollars is the minimum amount required, and the raising of the amount should not be doubtful. Gentlemen desiring to anticipate Mr. Keil's visit may leave contributions for him at the JOURNAL office, if more convenient.

Calder won the commission for the statue through an 1894 national design competition. He based his likeness of Dr. Gross on photographs that his former teacher, Thomas Eakins, had taken in preparation for the 1876 painting, The Gross Clinic. Other sculptors in the design competition included Charles Grafly and Samuel Murray, fellow former students of Eakins, with whom Eakins also shared copies of the negatives.

Calder completed his larger-than-life-size plaster statue in Philadelphia, and it was shipped to Paris to be cast in bronze at the Jaboeuf & Bezout foundry. Congress appropriated funds for the statue's pink granite base—three square steps and pedestal, 108 in (270 cm) in height—and the completed bronze was shipped to Washington, D.C. The monument was installed at the northeast corner of 9th Street and Independence Avenue, between the Army Medical School and the Smithsonian Institution Building.

The monument's May 6, 1897 dedication was timed to coincide with the Washington, D.C. convention of the Congress of American Physicians and Surgeons. President William McKinley spoke at the ceremony, as did Surgeon General of the U.S. Army George M. Sternberg, and William Williams Keen, Dr. Gross's former student and successor as Professor of Surgery at Jefferson Medical College, and America's first brain surgeon. Dr. Gross's granddaughter and great-grandson unveiled the statue.

=== Relocation ===
In preparation for excavation of the 9th Street Tunnel under the National Mall, the monument was removed and placed in storage in the late 1960s. The Army Medical Museum and Library (formerly the Army Medical School Building) was demolished in 1969, and the Hirshhorn Museum and Sculpture Garden (completed 1974) was built on its site. In April 1970, the statue and its base were relocated to the campus of Jefferson Medical College, where Dr. Gross had gone to medical school and been Professor of Surgery for 28 years.

Alexander Stirling Calder's statue of Samuel D. Gross, which Jefferson retrieved from the warehouses of the Federal Government in Washington, where it had been moved from the Mall during construction of an expressway underpass, was placed to the rear of the Scott Building some months ago. The real question is why Jefferson placed it overlooking the parking lot rather than on the Walnut Street front, as the architects suggested. One assumes that it is to relate eventually to an open area in the center of the block which would result if new construction proceeds along Eleventh and Locust Streets and parking is placed underground.

=== Inscriptions ===
(Sculpture, Lower proper left side):

JABOEUF & BEZOUT FONDEURS A PARIS [a Founder's mark appears]

(Sculpture, Lower proper right side):

CALDER

(Granite base, front):

SAMUEL D. GROSS

American Physicians have erected
this statue to commemorate great deeds
of a man who made such an impress
on American surgery that it has served
to dignify American Medicine

1897

== See also ==
- List of public art in Philadelphia
