= Kahal Kadosh Beth Shalome =

Former Jewish synagogue in Richmond, Virginia, United States

- Hebrew: קהל קדוש בית שלום
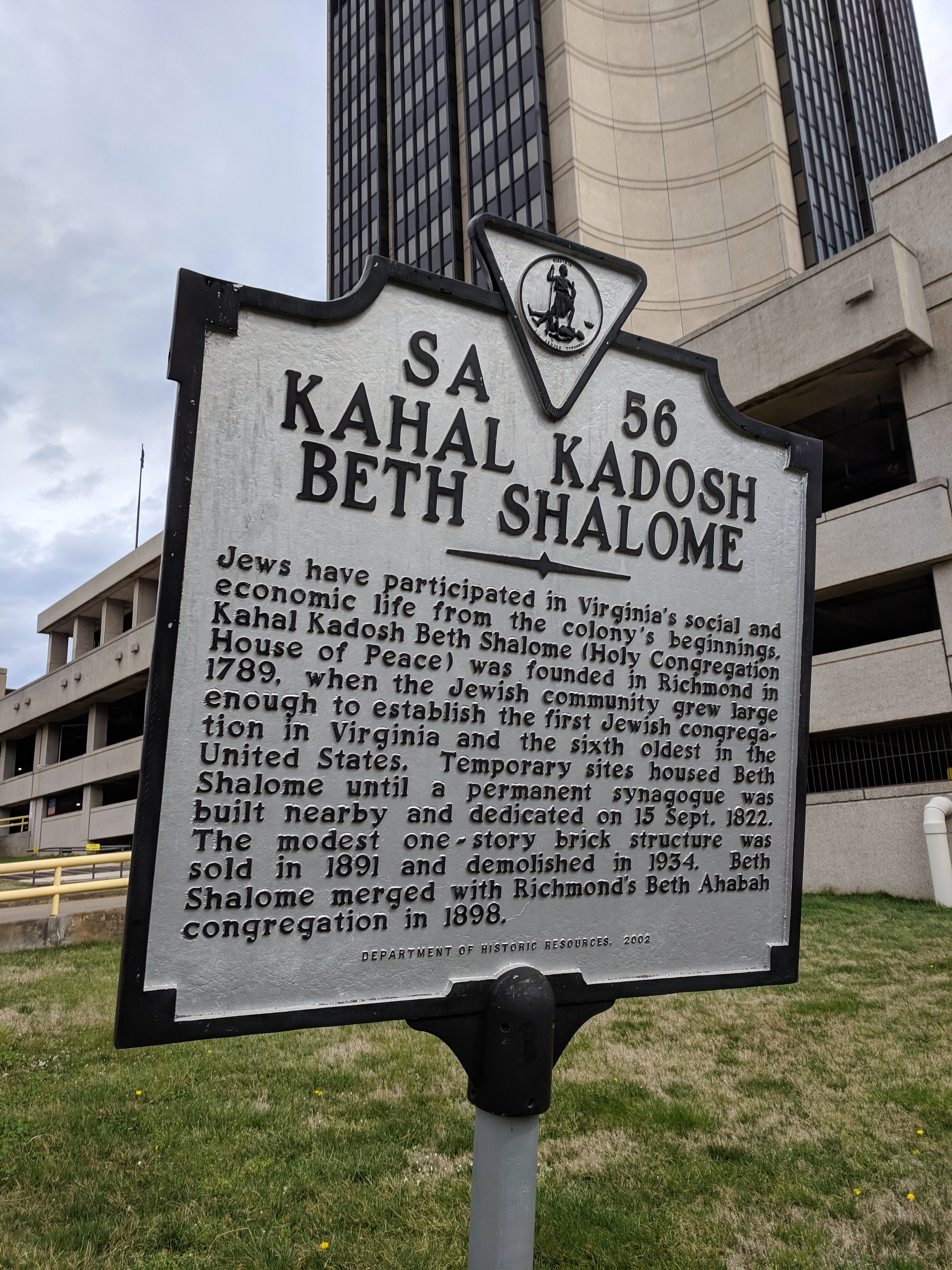
- Kahal Kadosh Beth Shalome historical marker, in 2019

Religion
- Affiliation: Judaism (former)
- Rite: Nusach Sefard
- Ecclesiastical or organizational status: Synagogue (1789–1898)
- Status: Closed and deconsecrated; Merged with Congregation Beth Ahabah (in 1898)

Location
- Location: Richmond, Virginia
- Country: United States

Architecture
- Established: 1789 (as a congregation)

Kahal Kadosh Beth Shalome (Hebrew: קהל קדוש בית שלום, lit. 'Congregation Holy House of Peace') is a former Jewish congregation and synagogue that was located in Richmond, Virginia, in the United States. Established in 1789, the congregation merged with Congregation Beth Ahabah in 1898.

It was the first synagogue built in Richmond; and it was also the first Sephardic Kahal in Virginia. The creation of this community was a natural outgrowth of early immigration to North America and it was one of the first six synagogues built in British Colonies which would become known as United States of America. Kahal Kadosh Beth Shalome received its charter to operate three years after the Virginia General Assembly passed the Virginia Statute for Religious Freedom in 1786.

== History ==
=== Jews in Virginia Colony ===
Virginia Colony emerged from the ashes of the Roanoke Colony. Sir Walter Raleigh was the owner of the charter for the Roanoke/Virginia Colony. Roanoke Colony was financed by Sir Humphrey Gilbert, who drowned in 1583. Sir Humphrey Gilbert's half brother, Sir Walter Raleigh, attained his brother's charter to colonize North America from Queen Elizabeth I on March 25, 1584, and proceeded to fulfill the charter through Ralph Lane and Richard Grenville, Raleigh's distant cousin.

On August 17, 1585, Ralph Lane, along with 107 men, built a fort on Roanoke Island as Grenville sailed back to England for supplies. By April 1586 conditions on Roanoke Island had decayed; the expedition had destroyed a nearby village occupied by indigenous people resulting in retribution against the fortifications on Roanoke Island. As luck would have it, Sir Francis Drake visited the Roanoke Colony on his way back to England in April 1586. Recognizing the dire conditions of the expedition he rescued the remaining members of the Roanoke Island expedition. One of the men in this expedition was named Joachim Gans, a Jew from Prague who was the best metallurgist in all of Europe at that time and the first Jew to set foot in the New World under the British Flag.

=== Earliest arrivals in New World ===
The arrival of a Jewish presence in Virginia Colony, even after Joachinm Gans, predates the arrival of all other Jews. Elias Legarde (a/k/a Legardo) was a Sephardic Jew who arrived at James City on the Abigail in 1621. According to Leon Huhner, Elias was from Languedoc, France, and was hired to go to the Colony to teach people how to grow grapes for wine. Elias Legarde was living in Buckroe in Elizabeth City in February 1624. Elias was employed by Anthonie Bonall. Anthonie Bonall was a French silk maker and vigneron (cultivates vineyards for winemaking), one of the men from Languedoc sent to the colony by John Bonall, keeper of the silkworms of King James I. In 1628 Elias leased 100 acres on the west side of Harris Creek in Elizabeth City.

Elias was not alone; there were others. Josef Mosse and Rebecca Isaake are documented in Elizabeth City in 1624. John Levy patented 200 acres of land on the main branch of Powell's Creek around 1648, Albino Lupo who traded with his brother, Amaso de Tores, in London. Two brothers named Silvedo and Manuel Rodriguez are documented to be in Lancaster County, Virginia, around 1650.

=== Richmond's Revolutionary Jews ===
Richmond was founded in 1737. Dr. John de Sequeyra arrived in Virginia in 1754 from London. Dr. Sequeyra traveled between Mount Vernon, Williamsburg and Richmond in the course of his duties. He was trained as a physician in Holland where he was known as Iohannes Disiqueyra, Dr Siccary, Sequeyra, de Siqueyra, Sequeyea, de Sequera. George Washington was a colonel at the time when he requested the services of Dr. John de Sequeyra to aid his stepdaughter Martha Parke Custis, also known as Patsy Custis. Throughout 1769, Colonel Washington and his wife, Martha Washington, received the assistance of Dr Sequeyra. In 1754, George Washington mounted an expedition across the Allegheny Mountains accompanied by Michael Franks, of Capt Braam's Company, and Jacob Myer of Capt Mercer's Company.

When George Washington was elected president, in 1789, the congregation of Kahal Kadosh Beth Shalome wrote a prayer in Hebrew "Prayer for the government in honor of George Washington, First President of the United States of America by Kahal Kadosh-Beit Shalome (1789)".

In 1791, George Washington wrote a letter to the Hebrew congregations of Philadelphia, New York, Charleston and Richmond, congratulating them on the charter, peaceful construction and dedication of their communities.

Most of the Sephardic Jews and Ashkenazi Jews of Richmond were Scottish Rite Freemasons. The President of Kahal Kadosh beth Shalome, Jacob I. Cohen, was Master of Richmond's Masonic Lodge #53. Another, Solomon Jacobs, served as master of the grand lodge of Virginia Masons from 1810 to 1813. Solomon Jacobs was not alone since nearly all male members of Kahal Kadosh Beth Shalome belonged to Masonic lodge #53.

=== Jews and the Civil War ===
George Jacobs was the congregation's rabbi from 1857 to 1869.

Jacob Ezekiel, father of the future sculptor Moses Jacob Ezekiel, was "a leader of Kahal Kadosh Beth Shalome …and spokesman of the Jews of Richmond. Jews fought on both sides of the U.S. Civil War. A prominent senator from Louisiana, by the name of Judah Benjamin, was Secretary of State for the Confederacy. Gustav Myers encouraged Benjamin to move to Richmond, from Louisiana, since Myers believed "Jews of high station reflected well in the eyes of both the Gentiles and other Jews by serving in visible office".

In 1863 Kahal Kadosh Beth Shalome used much of its own Kahal funds to purchase Confederate war bonds, bearing the signature of Benjamin, Secretary of State of the Confederacy. The ladies of Kahal Kadosh Beth Shalome met daily to make clothing for Confederate soldiers.

=== After the Civil War ===
Assimilation wracked the Sephardic and Ashkenazi communities in Richmond. After the War, Kahal Kadosh Beth Shalome lost many members who fled the area when the Confederate forces burned Richmond, never to return. (Jacob Ezekiel, his business in ruins, moved to Cincinnati, Ohio.) In 1898, Sephardi Kahal Kadosh Beth Shalome merged with Reform Congregation Beth Ahabah, thus ending the presence of a Sephardic house of worship in Richmond.

=== Richmond Jews and founding of Israel ===
At the end of World War II, a group of Jewish businessmen from Richmond, including Israel November and H.J. Bernstein partnered with friends from Virginia Beach to purchase and retrofit the former Chesapeake Bay ferry boat that became known to the world as the SS Exodus ship.

== See also ==
- List of the oldest synagogues in the United States
