= Moses Jacob Ezekiel =

American sculptor (1844–1917)

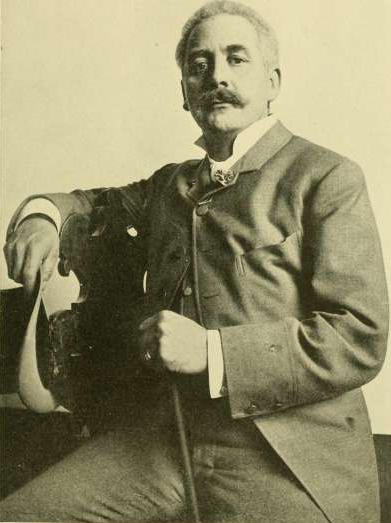
- Ezekiel in 1914
- Born: October 28, 1844; Richmond, Virginia, U.S.
- Died: March 27, 1917 (aged 72); Rome, Kingdom of Italy
- Education: Virginia Military Institute; Medical College of Virginia
- Known for: Sculpture
- Awards: New Market Cross of Honor

Moses Jacob Ezekiel, also known as Moses "Ritter von" Ezekiel (October 28, 1844 – March 27, 1917), was an American sculptor who lived and worked in Rome for the majority of his career. Ezekiel was "the first American-born Jewish artist to receive international acclaim". Ezekiel was an ardent supporter, in both his writings and in his works, of the Lost Cause view of the American Civil War (which he had fought in), asserting that he had "never fought for slavery, but for states' rights and for free trade." In a eulogy, President Warren Harding described him as "a great Virginian, a great artist, a great American, and a great citizen of world fame."

He was a cadet at the Virginia Military Institute (VMI) and served in the Confederate Army during the American Civil War, including at the Battle of New Market.

After the war, he completed his degree at VMI, and a few years later went to Berlin, studying at the Prussian Academy of Art. He subsequently moved to Rome, where he lived and worked most of his life, selling his works internationally, including several commissions in the United States.

He has been described as a "Confederate expatriate" and a "proud Southerner", and the Confederate battle flag hung in his Rome studio for 40 years. The most famous of his monuments is the Confederate Memorial in Arlington National Cemetery, which he thought of as the "crowning achievement of his career." The monument was removed on December 20, 2023; on August 5, 2025, it was announced that the monument would be reinstated.

== Early life ==
Ezekiel was born in Richmond, Virginia, the son of Jacob Ezekiel (1812–1899), an Ashkenazi Jew. His mother, Catherine de Castro Ezekiel, was Sephardic. His grandparents had emigrated from Holland in the early 1800s, settling first in Philadelphia and later in Richmond. His father was a cotton merchant and bookbinder, "a good writer and a well-read man, who possessed the complete works of Maimonides". While in the book-binding business in Baltimore (1833–34), Jacob founded the Hebrew Benevolent Society of Baltimore. Jacob moved to Richmond in 1834, entering the dry-goods business with first one, then another brother-in-law. He was secretary of the synagogue Kahal Kadosh Beth Shalome "and spokesman of the Jews of Richmond". In Cincinnati, Jacob served as Secretary of the Board of Hebrew Union College. He was a charter member of B'nai B'rith.

The seventh child, (Note: He may have been the fifth of 14 children.) Moses had three brothers and eight sisters, (Note: He may have had four brothers and nine sisters.) at least one of which was stillborn. He was brought up as an observant Jew by his grandparents, to whom his parents sent him to live due to financial difficulties. (Note: "My father was so very good-hearted that he ruined himself by signing bonds for some of his relatives who afterwards failed in business. That reduced my parents to absolute poverty for a long time.") They owned a dry-goods store that sold suits and women's dresses for slaves about to be sold. They also owned a few slaves. Moses "was sent to a 'pay' school", that of "old Mr. Burton Davis", and he attended dancing school.

== Virginia Military Institute and the Civil War ==
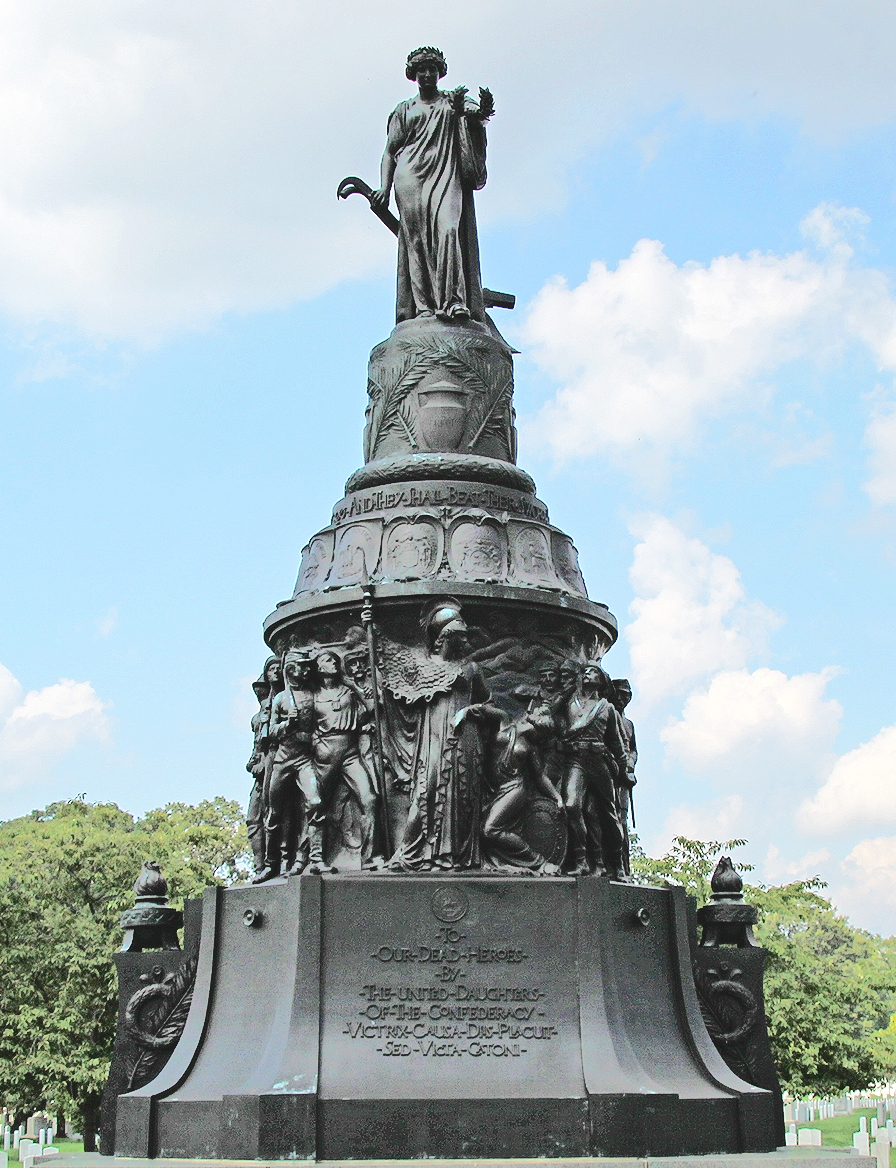
Ezekiel's most famous work, the Confederate Memorial at Arlington National Cemetery in Virginia.

When Fort Sumter was fired upon and Virginia seceded, Ezekiel enrolled in the Virginia Military Institute in Lexington, Virginia, the first Jewish cadet to do so. He was Corporal of the Guard that accompanied the coffin of Stonewall Jackson (a Virginia Military Institute instructor) at his burial in Lexington in 1863.

He and other cadets from VMI marched eighty miles north and fought at the Battle of New Market, providing crucially needed reinforcements against the army of Union General Franz Sigel. Wounded in the fight, he recovered and was reassigned with other surviving cadets to serve as drill instructors for new Confederate recruits. Shortly before the end of the war, he joined a last-ditch effort to defend Lexington during Grant's Richmond-Petersburg campaign. When peace was declared, he returned to VMI to finish his education, graduating in 1866.

== Sculpture ==
He then studied anatomy at the Medical College of Virginia in 1866–68, thinking of becoming a doctor. In 1867–68, he was superintendent of the Richmond Hebrew Sunday School. He moved in with his parents in Cincinnati in 1868; his parents had moved there, where their oldest daughter Hannah lived, after losing their business in Richmond to fire. While not there long, in his memoirs he called Cincinnati his home.

In Cincinnati he began the study of sculpture at the Art School of J. Insco Williams and in the studio of Thomas Dow Jones. Moving to Berlin in 1869, he studied at the Prussian Academy of Art under Professor Albert Wolf.

Needing money, in 1873, during the Franco-Prussian War, he was a war correspondent for the New York Herald, and he was arrested and imprisoned "for a time" as a spy for France. He was admitted into the Society of Artists, Berlin, and at age 29 was the first foreigner to win the Michael Beer Prix de Rome, for a bas relief entitled Israel. The prize of $1,000 provided for two years of study in Rome, but he traveled to Rome by way of the United States, where he had not been for five years, as he had "unexpectedly" received a commission from B'nai B'rith for a monument to religious liberty.

== Rome studio ==
Arriving in Rome in 1874, Ezekiel fell in love with the city, which he soon made his home. It was there that he completed the sculptures and paintings for which he is famous.

Ezekiel's life and studio in Rome were lavish. "He dressed like a dandy and spent extravagantly on entertaining friends, clients, and potential clients." His studio in Rome was in the former Baths of Diocletian, where every Friday afternoon he had open house. It was called "one of the Show Places of the Eternal City, magnificent in proportions and stored with fine art works." and many visitors left descriptions of it.

Among the visitors to his studio were:

- Gabriele d'Annunzio
- Queen of Italy Margherita of Savoy
- General and future President Ulysses Grant
- Franz Liszt
- U.S. ambassador to Italy John Stallo
- Cardinal Gustav Adolf Hohenlohe
- writer Annie Besant
- railroad magnate Melville Ingalls
- engineer Benjamin Hotchkiss, and
- Emperor Wilhelm II of Germany

Here also he made the acquaintance of Franz Liszt and Cardinal Gustave von Hohenlohe, the Papal representative of Austria. Thus, naturally, busts of these two famous men are included in Ezekiel's oeuvre.

A lecture in his studio was attended by 150 people. He also hosted musicales there, where could be heard "the finest music by the greatest talent".

Ezekiel occupied this studio from 1879 to 1910. After 30 years, the government "demand[ed] the possession of this part of the ruins as an adjunct to the National Roman Museum. On leaving there he was given by the municipal authorities the Tower of Belisarius on the Pincian Hill overlooking the Borghese Gardens, which furnished him a home for the rest of his years, while he took a studio and work rooms in the Via Fausta and just off the Piazza del Popolo."

== Personal life ==
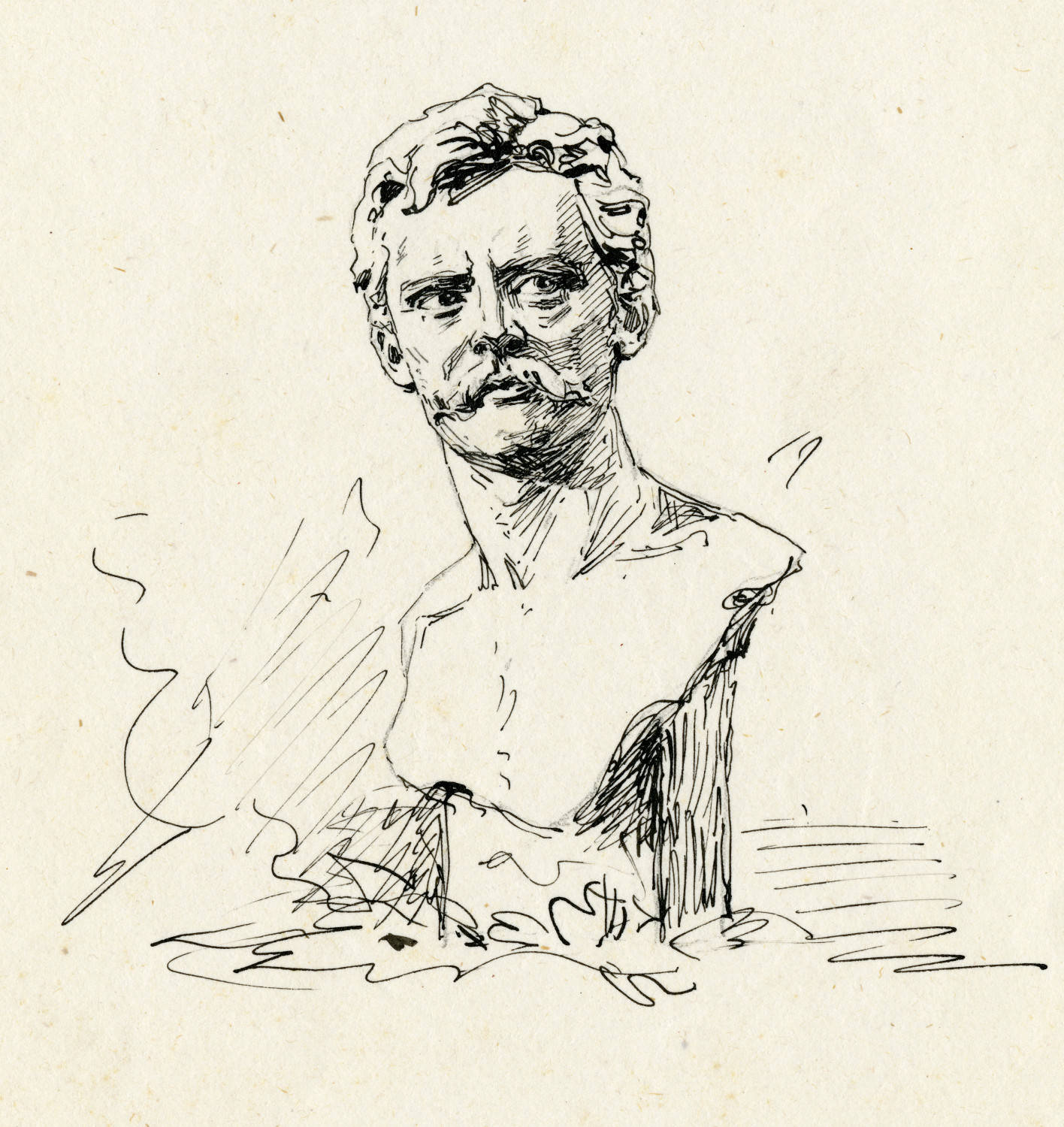
Fedor Encke. Drawing by Moses Jacob Ezekiel.

Although Ezekiel never married, he had a daughter, Alice Johnson (1859–1924). According to a census document of July 14, 1860, Alice Johnson was 10 months old, suggesting she was born in September 1859. She would therefore have been conceived at the beginning of 1859 when Moses was 14. Her mother was Isabella, a "beautiful mulatto housemaid" of his father. After graduating from Howard University, Alice became a schoolteacher and married Daniel Hale Williams in 1898, who was also mixed race. He became a prominent, pioneering heart surgeon. They lived in Chicago for much of his career.

Isabella visited Moses in Rome with Alice, but returned shortly thereafter. Moses never refers to Alice in his Memoirs, and there is no record of any other contact between them.

In 1872, in Berlin, he met Fedor Encke (1851–1926), the "illegitimate grandson of King Friedrich Wilhelm II of Prussia." Encke was a portrait painter later commissioned to do portraits of Theodore Roosevelt and John Pierpont Morgan, among others; he also painted Ezekiel. The pair "traveled together often and socialized with Europe's elites, including Hungarian composer Franz Liszt, French actress Sarah Bernhardt and Queen Margherita of Italy." Encke accompanied Ezekiel on a visit to the United States. According to writer Michael Feldberg, Ezekiel and Encke had "a forty-five year homosexual relationship…that neither acknowledged publicly." About this relationship, Ezekiel was always circumspect in his letters and memoirs, referring to Encke only as his "traveling companion" and "my dear friend."

Biographer Peter Adam Nash, in The Life and Times of Moses Jacob Ezekiel, describes Ezekiel as homosexual, but Nash does not produce any direct evidence for this; Nash's assumption is made from his research of Ezekiel's papers and of their social and historical context. Samantha Baskind's book about Ezekiel, based on six years of archival research and study, does not find any evidence to substantiate this assertion.

== Awards and honors ==
In his lifetime, Ezekiel received numerous honors: he was decorated by King Umberto I of Italy, the "Crosses for Merit and Art" from the German Emperor, another from Prince Frederick Johann of Saxe-Meiningen, and the awards of "Chevalier" (Cavaliere) and "Officer of the Crown of Italy" (1910) from King Victor Emmanuel III of Italy. Ezekiel received the Gold Medal of the Royal Society of Palermo, Italy; the silver medal at the 1904 Louisiana Purchase Exposition in St. Louis, Missouri; and the Raphael Medal from the Art Society of Urbino, Italy.

The honorific "Sir" by which Ezekiel is often referred is technically incorrect, as Ezekiel was never knighted by the monarch of the United Kingdom. More properly, his title was "Cavaliere" Moses Ezekiel, because of his Italian knighthood, or Moses "Ritter von" Ezekiel, because of his German honors. Ezekiel translated his Italian title into the English "Sir" on his visiting cards, resulting in the honorific by which he became known in English-speaking countries.

In 1904, he was presented the New Market Cross of Honor at VMI by the Government of Virginia as one of the 294 cadets who fought at the Battle of New Market.

== Grave ==
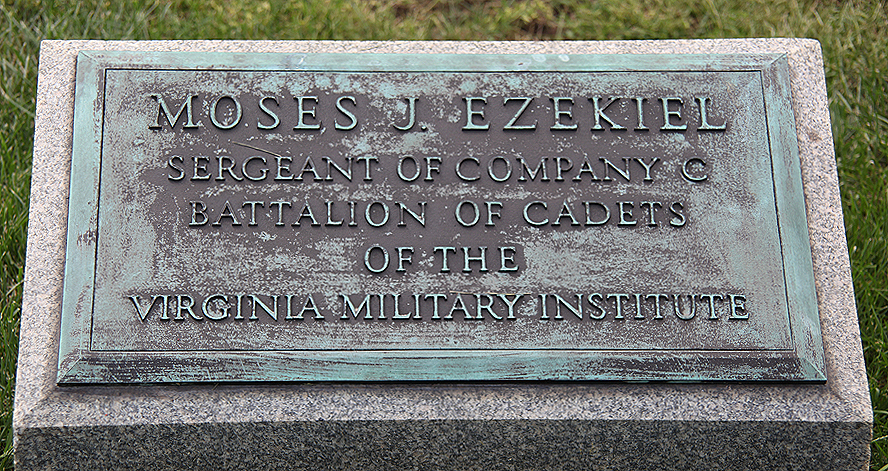
Ezekiel's grave on the north side of the Confederate Memorial at Arlington National Cemetery.

Ezekiel died in his studio in Rome, Italy during the First World War, and was temporarily entombed there. In 1921, he was reinterred at the foot of his Confederate Memorial in Section 16 of Arlington National Cemetery. The inscription on his grave reads "Moses J. Ezekiel Sergeant of Company C Battalion of Cadets of the Virginia Military Institute."

== Legacy ==
=== Critical assessments ===
Compared to Michelangelo in 1876, Ezekiel's fame has not stood the test of time. "Famous in his day, he is almost forgotten now" (1986). According to his biographer Peter Nash, "You wouldn't go to Rome to make new, progressive art." "He could not accept modern art", and "rejected" Rodin, whom he considered "pretentious". After noting the awards he received during his life, Sue Eisenfeld wrote in 2018:

But in death, the art world ignored and forgot him because he never innovated; he emulated the classical style of the previous masters, focusing on the full human figure and historical and allegorical subjects, even when the time for that style had come and gone.

"As was his custom with his monuments, Ezekiel proceeded meticulously to reflect historical accuracy," according to the editors of his memoirs.

[But his works] are utterly devoid of innovations or daring new modes of representation. His prime concern was the literary and historical idea behind the work…. But he failed to realize, like other 19th-century artists, that noble thoughts alone do not guarantee that the works they inspire will be great art… he frequently sacrificed his design to accurate depiction and photographic truth.

=== "Lost Cause" movement ===
Another factor possibly contributing to his relative obscurity may be his devotion to the Confederacy.

Ezekiel's sculptures of Confederate heroes are the most visible manifestation of, and a significant factor in the legitimacy of, the Lost Cause of the Confederacy, which he espoused.

Ezekiel's work has been identified as integral to this sympathetic view of the Civil War. He depicted Confederate leaders, like Stonewall Jackson, or fallen soldiers like the VMI students, as heroes. "But no monument exemplifies the Lost Cause narrative better than Ezekiel's Confederate Memorial in Arlington, where the woman representing the South appears to be protecting the black figures below." According to his relative Judith Ezekiel, "This statue was a very, very deliberate part of revisionist history of racist America." According to historian Gabriel Reich, "the statue functions as propaganda for the Lost Cause.… It couldn't be worse."

On August 20, 2017, in the aftermath of the Unite the right rally in Charlottesville, Virginia — members of Ezekiel's extended family sent a letter to the Washington Post, asking for the Arlington monument's removal:

Like most such monuments, this statue intended to rewrite history to justify the Confederacy and the subsequent racist Jim Crow laws. It glorifies the fight to own human beings, and, in its portrayal of African Americans, implies their collusion. As proud as our family may be of Moses's artistic prowess, we — some twenty Ezekiels — say remove that statue. Take it out of its honored spot in Arlington National Cemetery and put it in a museum that makes clear its oppressive history.

As of December 2023, plans were under way to remove the statue from Arlington, with plans to relocate it to the New Market Battlefield State Historical Park. Ezekiel had a personal link to the New Market site as he fought for the Confederacy and was wounded at this battlefield.

== Works ==
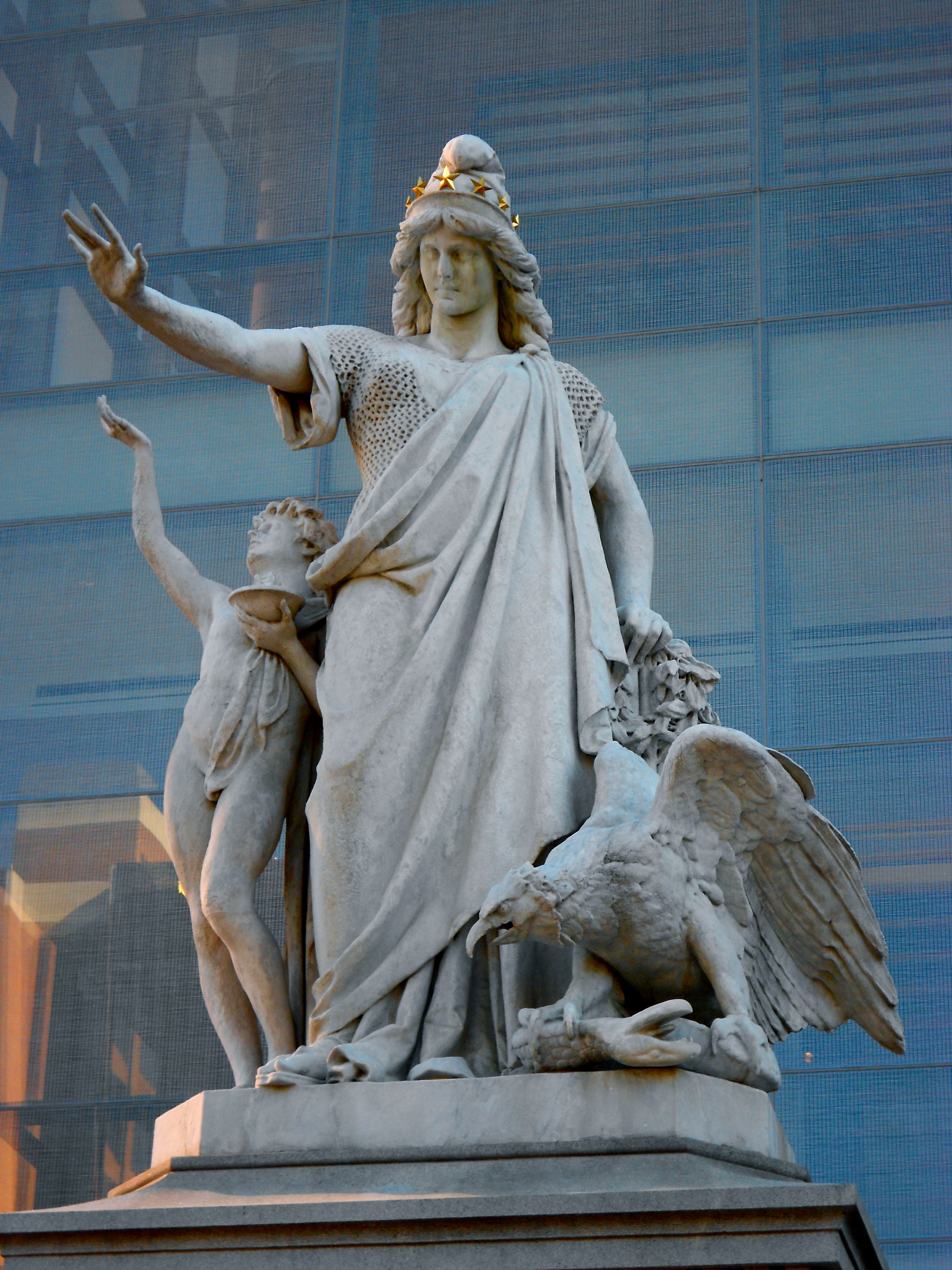
Religious Liberty (1876) in Philadelphia.

In the early 1880s, Ezekiel created eleven larger-than-life sized statues of famous artists. These were installed in niches on the façade of the Corcoran Gallery of Art's original building (later the Smithsonian's Renwick Gallery). In the early 1960s, they were removed to the Norfolk Botanical Garden in Norfolk, Virginia.

Among his other works was a memorial at VMI, Virginia Mourning Her Dead (1903), for which he declined payment. It was installed in the small cemetery where six of the 10 VMI cadets killed at the Battle of New Market are buried. He also created a Confederate memorial which he called New South (1914); it was installed at Arlington National Cemetery. Many of his works were of famous leaders.

One word frequently used by Ezekiel as well as others to describe his statues is "colossal": his "genius often asserts itself in colossal figures and emblematic monuments". His never-built statue of Johns Hopkins, founder of Johns Hopkins University, was to have been over 15 feet (4.6 m) high, with a "colossal" bust of Hopkins, in bronze, 21/2 times life size. His most important statues are huge, and in one case he claimed that it was the largest statue ever made.

Lists of Ezekiel's works are found in the introduction to his Memoirs, in an obituary in Art and Archaeology, and in the New York Times.

Ezekiel was a postwar friend of Robert E. Lee, who recommended he become "an artist", and Ezekiel once remarked "the one work I would love to do above anything else in the world" was a public sculpture of Robert E. Lee. But, despite entering at least four contests to do so, this ambition was not realized.

=== Statues ===
- Religious Liberty (1876), commissioned by B'nai Brith, originally installed in Fairmount Park, Philadelphia, later moved to the National Museum of American Jewish History in the same city. "colossal."
- artists Phidias, Raphael, Durer, Michelangelo, Titian, Murillo, Da Vinci, Correggio, Van Dyke, Canova, Thomas Crawford (1879–1884), originally installed in niches on the façade of the Corcoran Gallery of Art, Washington, DC., later moved to "Statuary Vista", Norfolk Botanical Garden, Norfolk, Virginia. As of 2013 there was a campaign to restore them.
- Spinoza statuette (1883), Hebrew Union College, donated by the artist for fundraising.
- Mrs. Andrew Dickson White (Mary Amanda Outwater) (1889), Sage Chapel, Cornell University
- Christopher Columbus (1892), Arrigo Park, Chicago, Illinois. Bronze, "faced with gold mosaic". Commissioned for the 1893 World's Columbian Exposition (Chicago World's Fair), which Ezekiel attended. Placed over the entrance to the Columbus Memorial building.
- Jesse Seligman (1895)
- Thomas Jefferson (1901), Louisville Metro Hall, Louisville, Kentucky.
  - A 1910 replica is at the University of Virginia, Charlottesville, Virginia.
- Virginia Mourning Her Dead (1903), Virginia Military Institute, Lexington, Virginia. "Colossal."
  - A replica is at the former Museum of the Confederacy, (the American Civil War Museum, Richmond, Virginia).
- Anthony J. Drexel (1904), Drexel University, Philadelphia, Pennsylvania.
- Blind Homer with His Student Guide 1881? (1907), University of Virginia, Charlottesville, Virginia.
- Jennie McGraw Fiske (1908), Sage Chapel, Cornell University
- Stonewall Jackson (1910), West Virginia State Capitol, Charleston, West Virginia.
  - A 1912 replica at the VMI in Lexington, Virginia (moved in 2020)
- Southern, at the Confederate Cemetery on Johnson's Island, Ohio, a 1910 commission from the United Daughters of the Confederacy.
- John Warwick Daniel, (c. 1913), Lynchburg, Virginia.
- Confederate Memorial (1914), Arlington National Cemetery, Arlington, Virginia.
- Edgar Allan Poe (Ezekiel's last work), 1915, Wyman Park, Baltimore, Maryland
- Neptune, date and location unknown, for Nettuno, Italy.
- Napoleon of St. Helena, statue in Rome, Italy.
- Edgar Allan Poe (1917), University of Baltimore, Baltimore, Maryland.

=== Reliefs ===
- Israel, 1873 (Skirball Museum, Los Angeles)
- Jacob Ezekiel, the artist's father, 1874 (Skirball Museum, Los Angeles)
- Catherine Ezekiel, the artist's mother, 1874 (Skirball Museum, Los Angeles)

=== Busts ===
- Bust of Friedrich Hassaurek
- Robert E. Lee (1886), Virginia Military Institute Museum
- Isaac Mayer Wise, Hebrew Union College, Cincinnati
- Goldwin Smith, 1906, Uris Library, Cornell University
- Head of Anthony J. Drexel (1905), Drexel University, Philadelphia, Pennsylvania
- Bust of General Robert E. Lee
- Bust of Percy Bysshe Shelley in the Keats-Shelley Memorial House, Piazza di Spagna, Rome
- Bust of Franz Liszt.
- Bust of Jessica (1880), Smithsonian American Art Museum, Washington, DC.
- Bust of Judith (c. 1880), Cincinnati Art Museum, Cincinnati, Ohio.
- In 1888 he completed a bust of Hopkins professor Charles D. Morris.
- Ecce Homo (1884), Cincinnati Art Museum, Cincinnati, Ohio.
- Bust of Thomas Jefferson (1888), United States Capitol, Washington, DC.
- Christ in the Tomb
- Napoleon at St. Helena
- The Martyr, or Christ Bound to the Cross
- David Singing his Song of Glory
- Judith Slaying Holofernes
- Jessica
- Portia
- the allegorical Jefferson Monument for Louisville, Kentucky, and a replica in front of the University of Virginia at Charlottesville
- Lord Sherbrooke Memorial in Westminster Abbey, London, England
- Senator Daniels at Lynchburg, Virginia
- Bust of Washington ("colossal")) in the Cincinnati Art Museum.
- Eve Hearing the Voice (1876), Cincinnati Art Museum, Cincinnati, Ohio.
- Faith (1877), Peabody Institute, Baltimore, Maryland.
- Marcus Aurelius (1903)
- Marcus Junius Brutus (1903)
- Bust of Governor Andrew Gregg Curtin (1912), Smith Memorial Arch, West Fairmount Park, Philadelphia, Pennsylvania.
- Andrew Dickson White, Uris Library, Cornell University
- Mary Outwater White, Uris Library, Cornell University

== Archival material ==
The American Jewish Archives, in Cincinnati, has a "Moses Jacob Ezekiel Collection." It "includes original and photocopies of Ezekiel's correspondence and writings, photographs of many of his works, biographies, genealogies, memorial tributes, correspondence of Ezekiel's biographers, articles and newsclippings concerning Ezekiel and miscellaneous items."

Virginia Military Institute has two boxes of Ezekiel papers. "Included is correspondence to Virginia Military Institute Superintendent Edward West Nichols and others, 1867 – 1917, some relating to the design of the Battle of New Market memorial sculpture Virginia Mourning Her Dead; pen and ink sketches by Ezekiel (ca. 67 items); the typed manuscript of Ezekiel's autobiography, Memoirs from the Baths of Diocletian, and miscellaneous printed material." Ezekiel's Memoirs, a fundamental source, were unknown until they were rediscovered in the Hebrew Union Archives by the two rabbis, who after much editorial work, prepared them for publication in 1975. They were called "gossipy" but "readable" in a review.

Some additional material is in the archives of Congregation Beth Ahabah, of Richmond, which contains the archive of Jacob Ezekiel's synagogue, Kahal Kadosh Beth Shalome, the Hebrew Union College of Cincinnati, on whose board of directors Jacob was secretary, and the organizations such as B'nai Brith and United Daughters of the Confederacy that commissioned sculptures.

== Gallery ==
Bas relief of Sarah Workum, private collection.

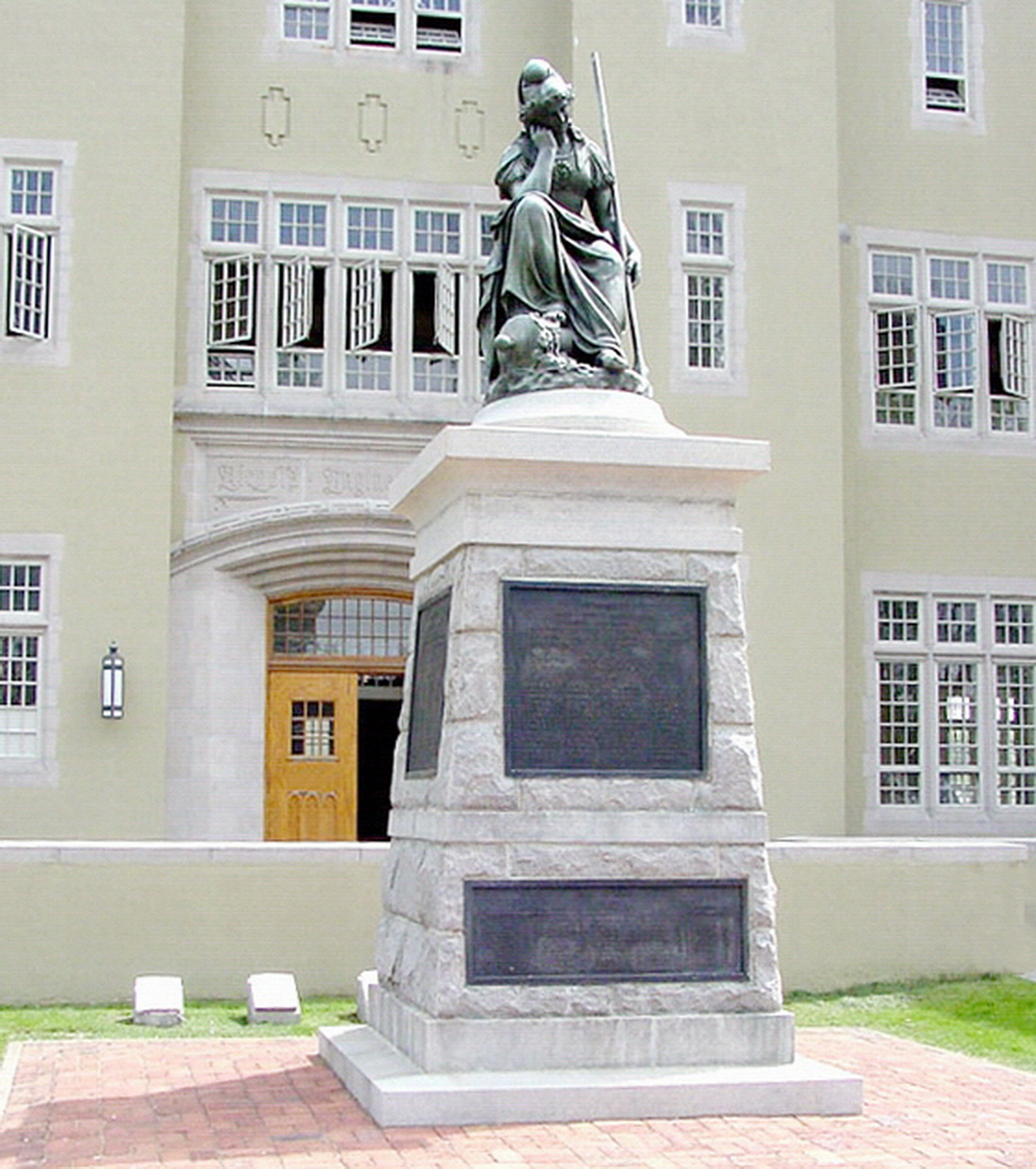
Virginia Mourning Her Dead (1903), Virginia Military Institute, Lexington, VA.

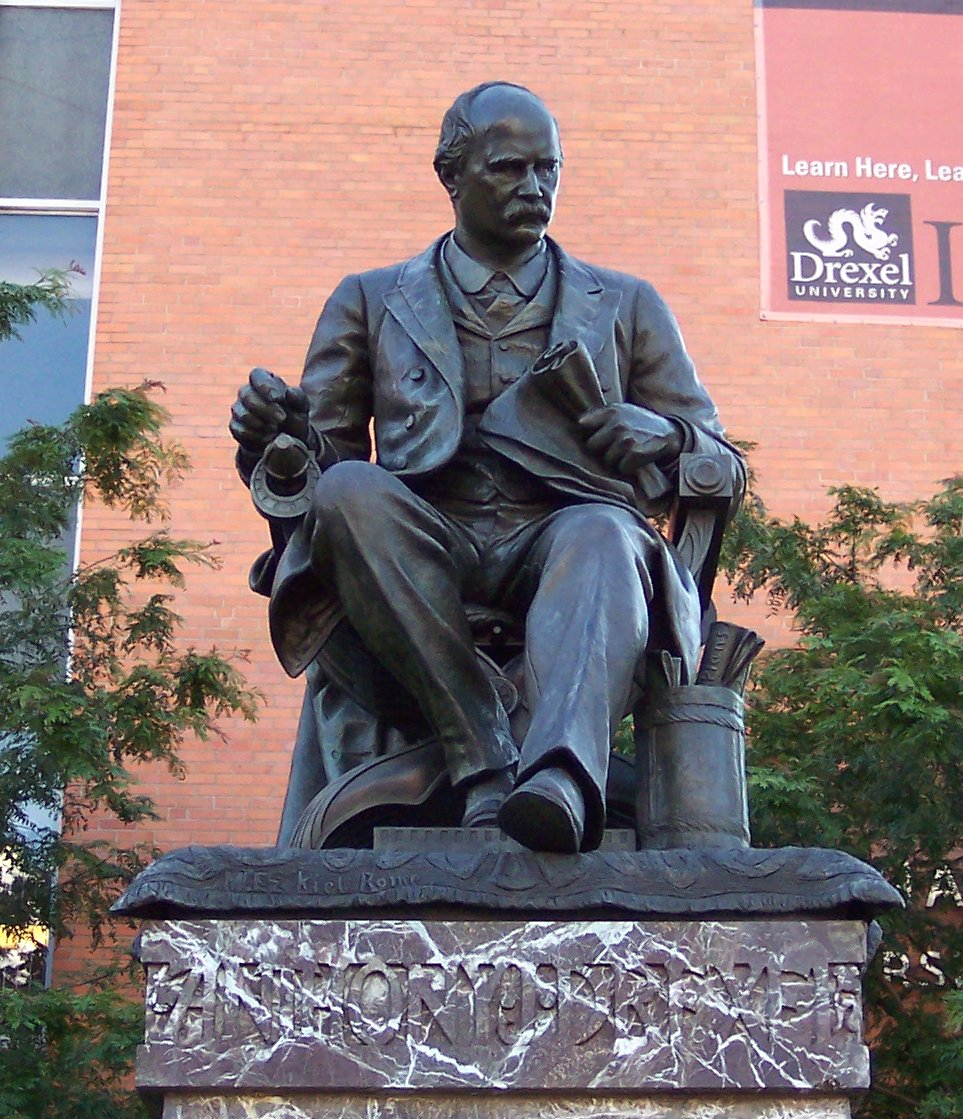
Anthony J. Drexel (1904), Drexel University, Philadelphia, PA.

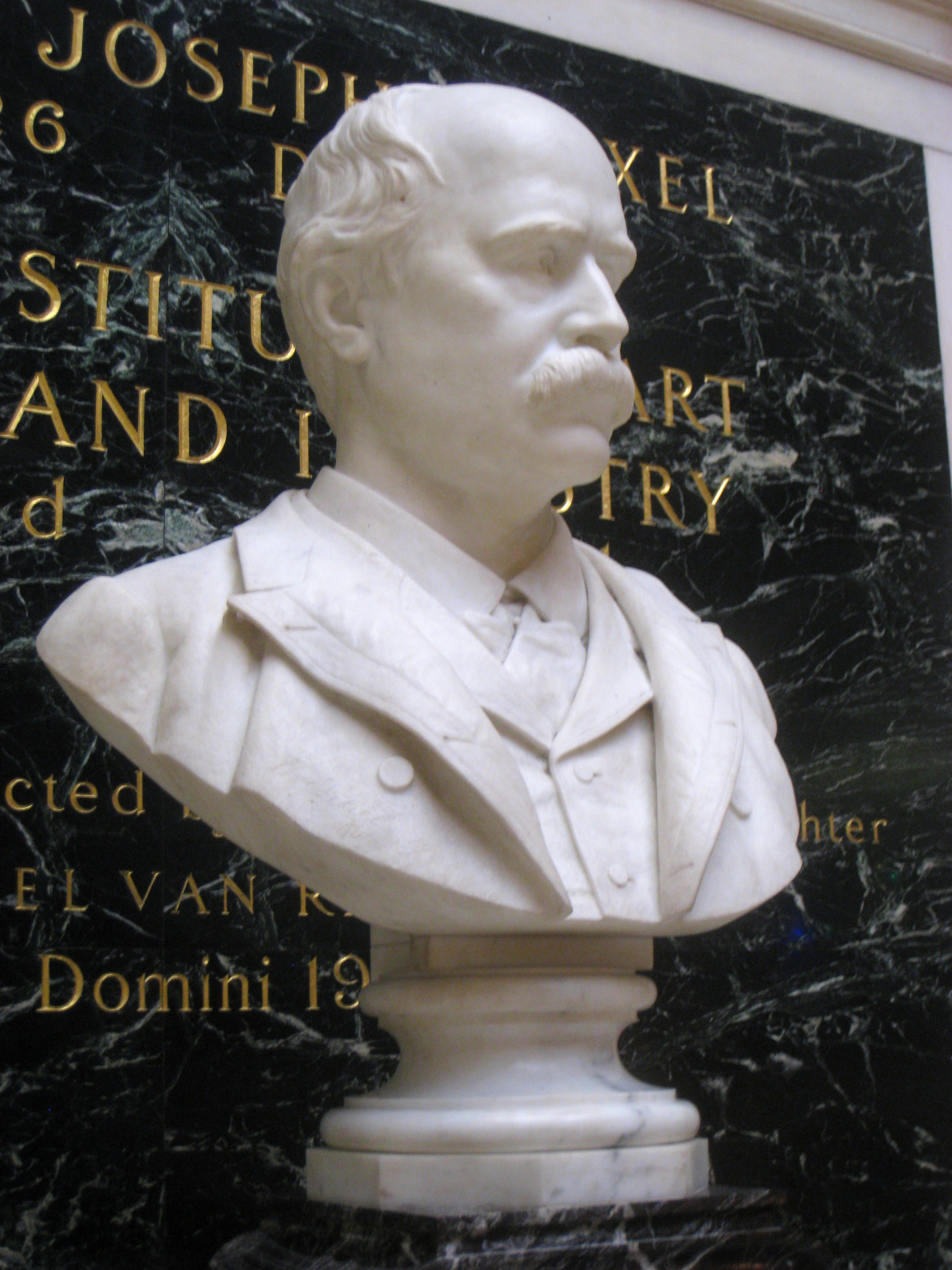
Bust of Anthony J. Drexel (1905), Drexel University, Philadelphia, PA.

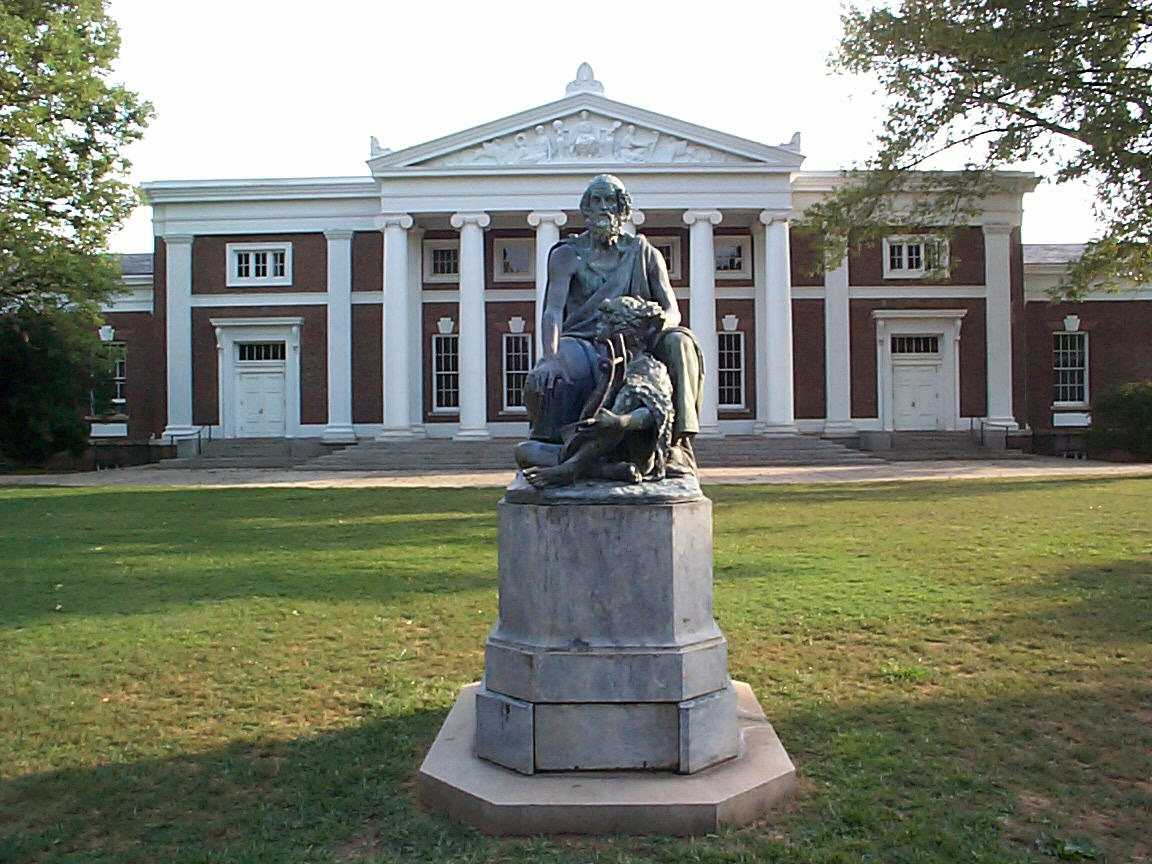
Blind Homer with His Student Guide (1907), University of Virginia, Charlottesville, VA.

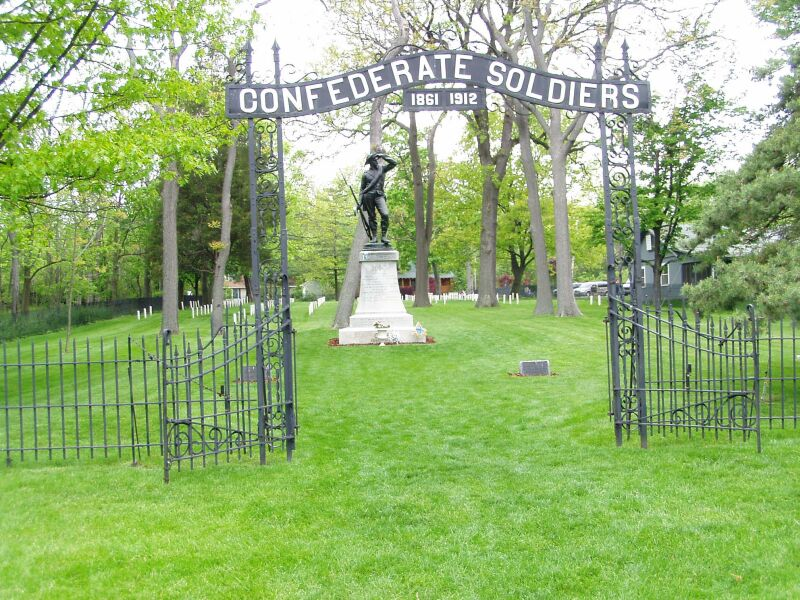
The Lookout (1910), Confederate Cemetery, Johnson's Island, OH.

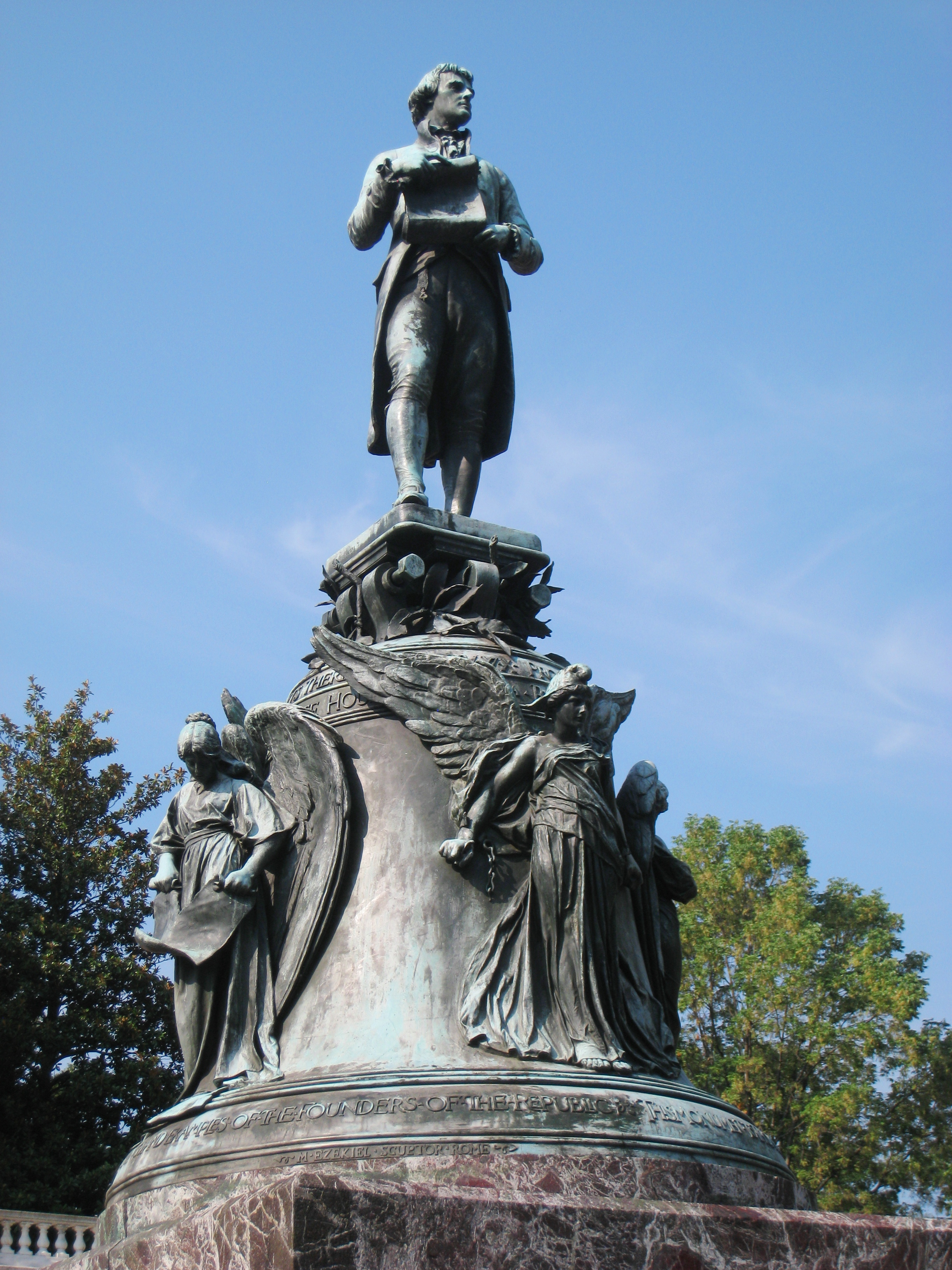
Jefferson Monument (1910), University of Virginia, Charlottesville, VA.

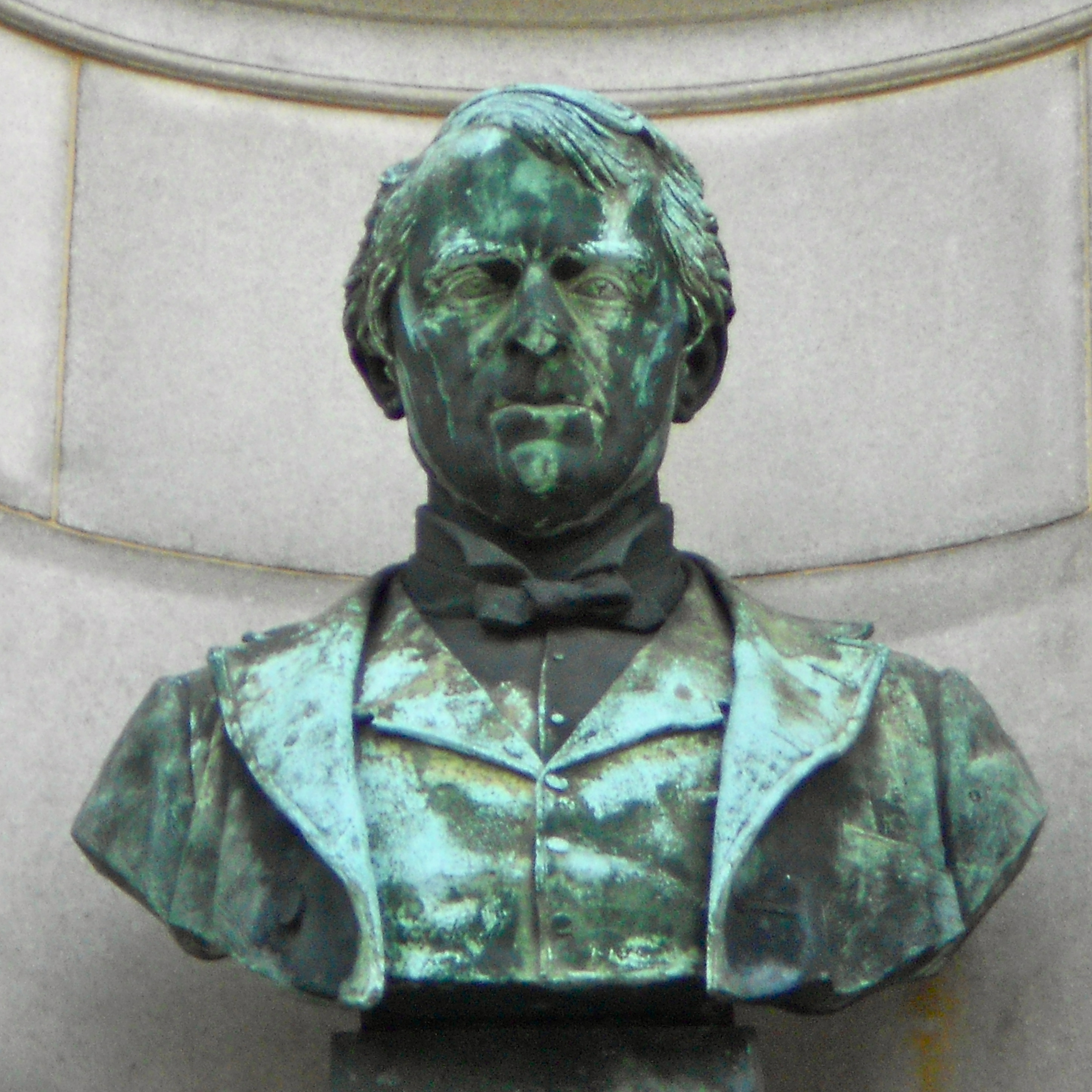
Bust of Andrew Gregg Curtin (1912), Smith Memorial Arch, Philadelphia, Pennsylvania.

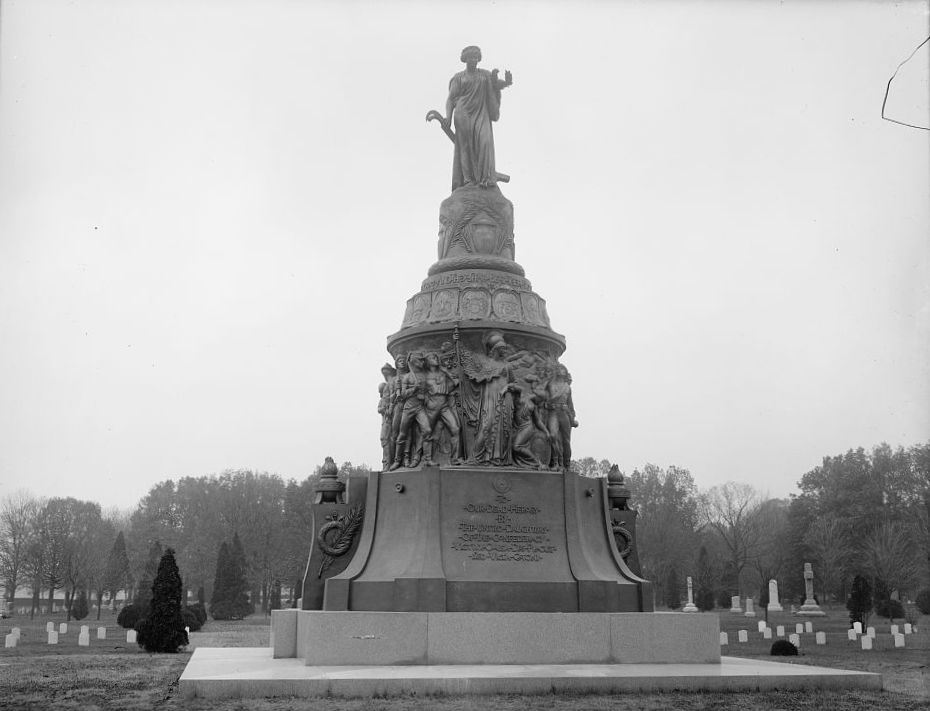
Confederate Memorial (Arlington National Cemetery) (1914), Arlington, VA.

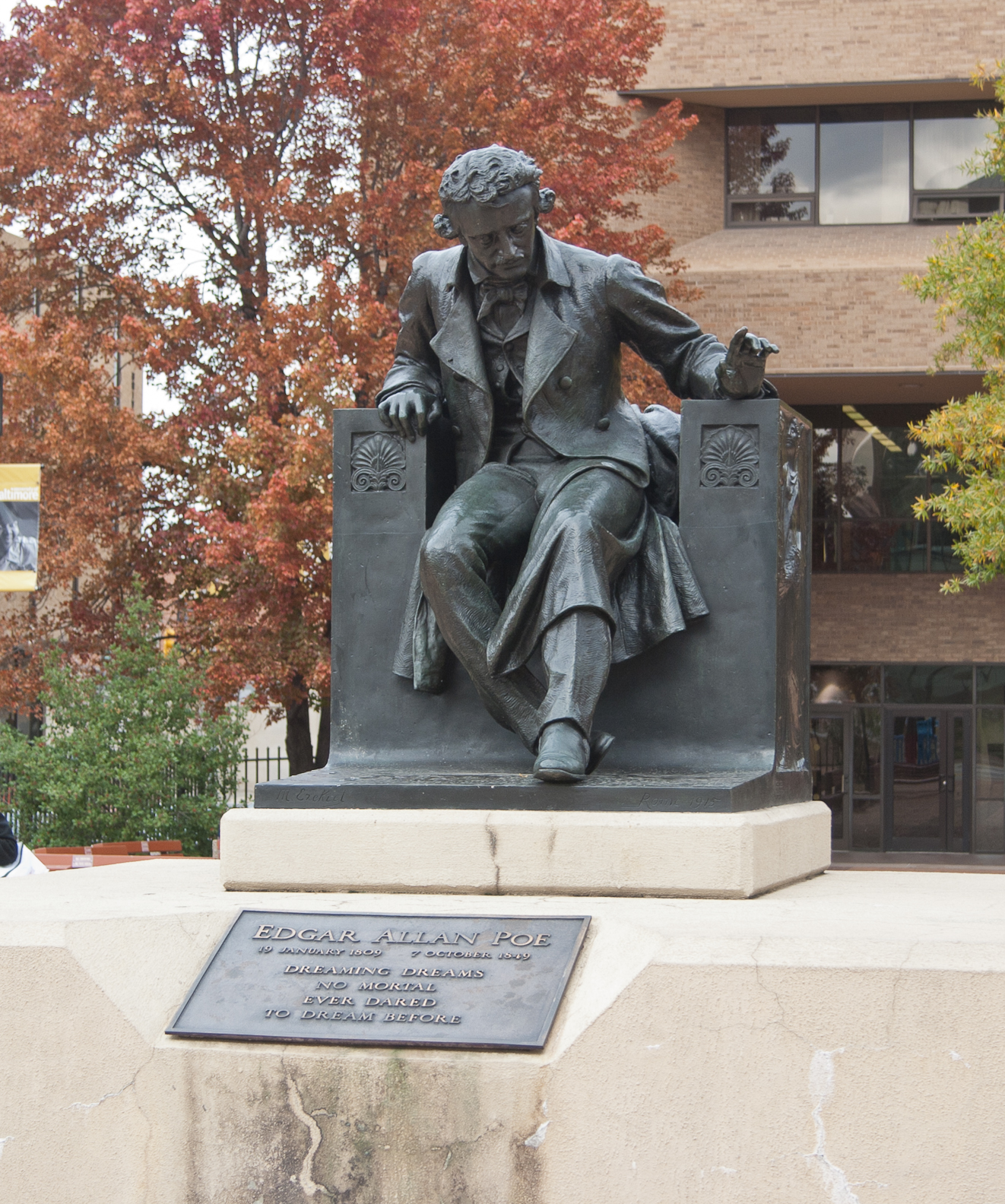
Statue of Edgar Allan Poe (1917), University of Baltimore, Baltimore, Maryland.

'

== In popular culture ==
Ezekiel was portrayed by Josh Zuckerman in the 2014 film Field of Lost Shoes, which depicted the Battle of New Market.

Ezekiel is the sculptor Askol in Carel Vosmaer's novel The Amazon, in which Ezekiel's studio is described in detail, It is also described in Mary Agnes Tincker's The Jewel in the Lotus; "the opening pages depict the studio of Salathiel, the sculptor, the original of which character in the novel was Moses Ezekiel."

A poem about his Israel was written by Pietschmann, of Berlin.

Gabriele d'Annunzio wrote a poem, "To Moie Ezekiel," in 1887.

A description of his studio by Lilian V. de Bosis was published in the May 1891 issue of 'kTye Esquiline.

== See also ==
- Herbert Barbee
- Edmonia Lewis, another American sculptor in Rome

== Bibliography ==
- Baskind, Samantha, "These 11 Marble Sculptures of Iconic Artists Once Decorated One of America’s First Art Museums. What Happened to Them?" Smithsonian Magazine, (2025).
- Baskind, Samantha, “Moses Jacob Ezekiel, Eve Hearing the Voice,” MAVCOR Journal 5, no. 1 (2021).
- Baskind, Samantha, “Moses Jacob Ezekiel's Portrait Bust of Rabbi Isaac Mayer Wise (1899),” American Jewish Archives Journal 73, no. 2 (2021): 18–29.
- Baskind, Samantha, “The Jewish Sculptor of the Confederacy,” Tablet Magazine (January 21, 2021).
- Baskind, Samantha, “An Enduring Monument: Moses Jacob Ezekiel's Religious Liberty (1876).” Weitzman National Museum of American Jewish History, Philadelphia, PA (November 2020).
- Cohen, Stan and Keith Gibson. Moses Ezekiel: Civil War Soldier, Renowned Sculptor, Pictorial Histories Publishing Company, Inc., 2007. ISBN 1-57510-131-9
- "Obituary. Sir Moses Ezekiel". American Art News. March 31, 1917. p. 4.
- Ezekiel, Moses Jacob (1975). Gutmann, Joseph; Chyet, Stanley F. (eds.). Memoirs from the Baths of Diocletian : or Memoirs of a Southern veteran. Detroit: Wayne State University Press. ISBN 978-0-8143-1525-5. "First publication."
- Leepson, Marc. "Sculpting the Cause", Civil War Times Illustrated, Vol. 46, Issue 9, November–December 2007.
- Nash, Peter Adam (2014). The Life and Times of Moses Jacob Ezekiel: American Sculptor, Arcadian Knight. Madison–Teaneck, New Jersey: Fairleigh Dickinson University Press. ISBN 978-1611476712.
- Preston, Margaret J. (June 1883). "The American Sculptor Ezekiel". Lippincott's Magazine of Popular Literature and Science: 620–623.
- "Ezekiel, Sculptor, Arrives: Here to Attend Unveiling of His Statue of Jefferson in Charlottesville". New York Times. May 25, 1910. p. 9.
- Wrenshall, Katharine H. (November 1909). "An American Sculptor In Rome: The Work of Sir Moses Ezekiel". The World's Work: A History of Our Time. XIX: 12255–12263.

== Video ==
- NorfolkTV (October 10, 2013), Moses Ezekiel Statues from the 1800s, City of Norfolk
