= New Market Cross of Honor =

Virginia Military Institute commemorative medal

- Awarded for: Service in the Virginia Military Institute Corps of Cadets at New Market (May 15, 1864) during the American Civil War
- Sponsored by: Virginia Military Institute Alumni Association
- Date: 1904; 122 years ago
- Location: Lexington, Virginia
- Country: United States
- Notable recipients: Moses Jacob Ezekiel

The New Market Cross of Honor was a commemorative medal established in 1904 by the Virginia Military Institute Alumni Association (VMIAA) to honor Confederate veterans who served in the Virginia Military Institute Corps of Cadets at the Battle of New Market (May 15, 1864) during the American Civil War.

== History ==
The New Market Cross of Honor award was presented to the 294 cadets who fought at the Battle of New Market on May 15, 1864, turning the tide of the battle for the Confederacy. The cadets had previously been listed on the Confederate Roll of Honor. A notable recipient was Moses Jacob Ezekiel. A medal was also presented to Eliza Catherine Clinedinst Crim, a New Market resident, who had nursed injured cadets after the battle. Upon her death in 1931, cadets served as the pallbearers and her grave marker said "Mother of the New Market Corps". Since 1962, VMI has awarded a similar "New Market Medal" to distinguished alumni.
