= Jefferson Monument (Louisville, Kentucky) =

Statue in Louisville, Kentucky, US

Coordinates: 38°15′15″N 85°45′34″W

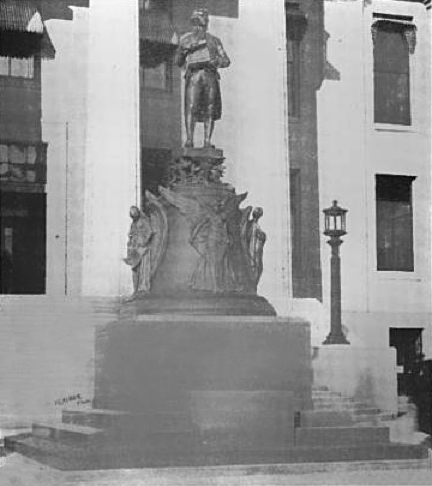
1902 photo of the Thomas Jefferson statue by Moses Jacob Ezekiel in Louisville, Kentucky.

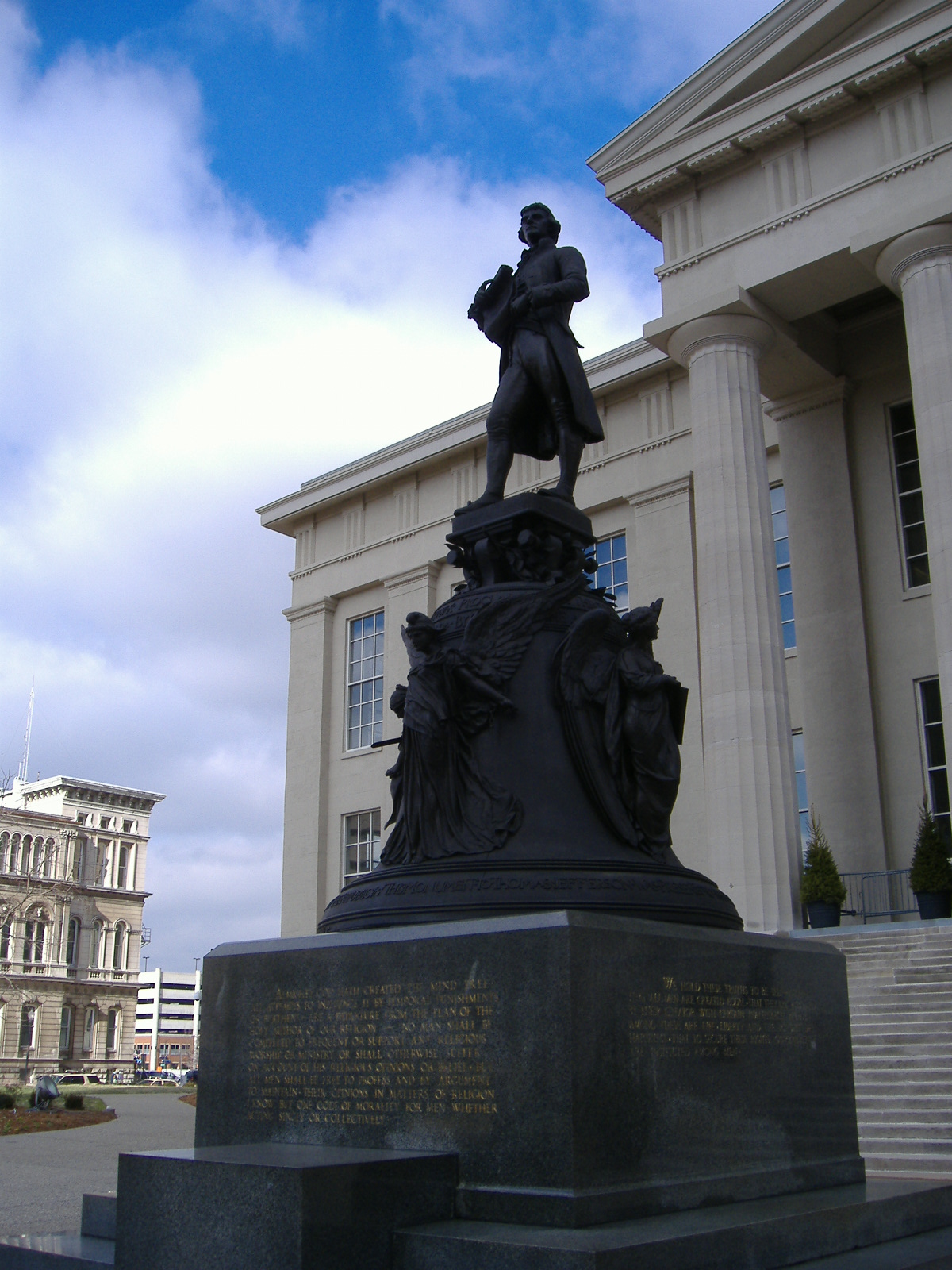
Thomas Jefferson statue in front of the Louisville Metro Hall

The Jefferson Monument is a statue by Moses Jacob Ezekiel located outside the Louisville Metro Hall in Louisville, Kentucky, US.

== History ==
The monument to Founding Father Thomas Jefferson was created in 1899 by Moses Ezekiel. It was commissioned as one of two sculptures for the exterior of the Jefferson County Courthouse; the other statue honors Louis XIV.

The Jefferson statue was presented to the city of Louisville by the Bernheim Brothers, two wealthy, public-spirited businessmen of the city, in November 1901. It was unveiled at ceremonies that included addresses by former Governor of Kentucky William O'Connell Bradley and Mayor Charles P. Weaver. It stands on Jefferson street in front of the Jefferson County Court House, the architecture of the later forming an effective background.

== Description ==
The status of Jefferson is in bronze, 9 feet (2.7 m) high, and represents him at the age of 33 presenting the Declaration of Independence to the Second Continental Congress. The subject is well conceived and executed with power and artistic taste. An original feature is the bronze pedestal, which represents the famous Liberty Bell, the height being 9 feet (2.7 m) with a diameter of nearly 10 feet (3.0 m). On the outside of this bell at four equidistant points are modeled figures, representing Liberty, Equality, Justice and the Brotherhood of Man. The statue symbolizing Liberty shows the Goddess of Liberty starting forward bursting the chains from her arms. She occupies the front of the pedestal and the flowing drapery and vigorous motion of the figure are incisively portrayed. Justice, with bandaged eyes, is shown with drawn sword in one and hand and scales in the other. Equality is typified in female form, represented in the act of casting from her the law of primo-geniture, and treading underfoot the 1765 Stamp Act.

The lower part of the monument is of dark Quincy granite from the Quincy Granite Quarries in Quincy, Massachusetts, all parts highly polished, the die block being 10 square feet (0.93 m^{2}) and 5 feet (1.5 m) high resting on steps or bases laid in sections, the lowest of which is 19 feet (5.8 m) square. The whole is 25 feet (7.6 m) high. Clarke & Loomis of Louisville were the constructing architects, and the bronze was cast in Berlin, Germany. The sculptor is Sir Moses Ezekiel, who designed the granite pedestal and executed the models for statuary at his studio in Rome.

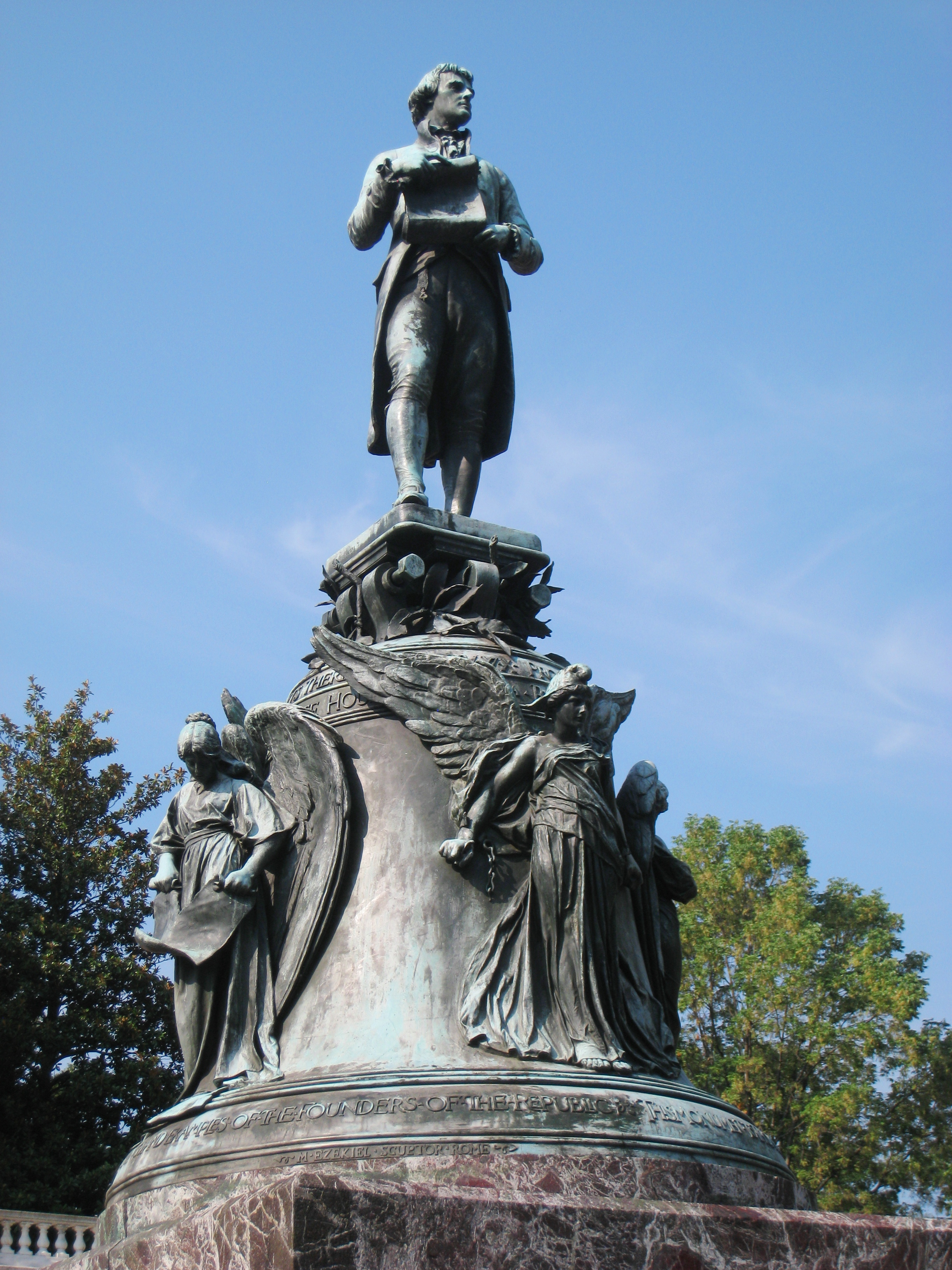
A smaller replica of the Louisville statue, the Thomas Jefferson Monument (1910) by Ezekiel stands at the University of Virginia

A smaller replica of the monument stands at the University of Virginia, which Jefferson founded in 1819.

== See also ==
- List of statues of Thomas Jefferson
- List of sculptures of presidents of the United States
- Jefferson Memorial, Washington, D.C.
