= Jacob Ezekiel =

American merchant (1812-1899)

Jacob Ezekiel (June 28, 1812 – May 16, 1899) was an American merchant and leader of the Jewish community in antebellum Richmond, Virginia. In Cincinnati after the Civil War, he was for many years Secretary of the Board of Hebrew Union College. He was a charter member of B'nai B'rith, the first national Jewish organization in the United States. According to his son Moses, he was a good writer and a well-read man, "a man of cultivation", who possessed the complete works of Maimonides. He was the father of Moses Jacob Ezekiel (1844–1917).

== Background ==
Jacob's grandfather, Eleazar Joseph Israel, was a sofer (Jewish scribe); a Torah he copied is owned by synagogue Mikveh Israel in Philadelphia. His Ashkenazic parents, Ezekiel Jacob Ezekiel and Hannah Rebecca Israel, came from Amsterdam, Holland (a Sephardic center), to Philadelphia; Jacob was born there two years later. Joseph had an elder sister, Martha, born in Holland, and a younger sister Adeline. His mother died when he was six, and he continued growing under the care of his uncle, Michael E. Cohen, who had a family board him. At age thirteen he started a seven-year apprenticeship as a bookbinder. The apprenticeship completed, he set up a book-binding business in Baltimore (1833–34), where he founded the Hebrew Benevolent Society of Baltimore. In 1834 he moved to Richmond, following his father, who had already moved there.

== In Richmond ==
In Richmond, on June 10, 1835, he married Catherine Myers Castro (February 28, 1819 – July 11, 1891), a Sephardic Jew born in Amsterdam, Holland, who came to the United States only four years previously, at the age of twelve. He entered the dry-goods business at 41 Main Street with first one, then another brother-in-law; then he was in the business alone. According to his son Moses, "My father was so very good-hearted that he ruined himself by signing bonds for some of his relatives who afterwards failed in business. That reduced my parents to absolute poverty for a long time." As a result of his financial situation, his son Moses grew up living with Jacob's parents, Moses' grandparents.

The dry-goods store sold, among other things, suits and women's dresses for slaves about to be sold. Jacob and his wife also owned a few slaves; Census records show that in 1850 Jacob owned a female of 55 and four males (69, 19, 12, 11), but none in 1860. He also was a cotton merchant.

Shortly after his arrival he was elected Secretary of Richmond's first synagogue, Kahal Kadosh Beth Shalome, "The Congregation of the House of Peace", which was Sephardic. Later becoming Treasurer as well, he held that office until his departure from Richmond thirty years later.

He was one of the organizers of annual balls "in aid of a Hebrew school fund", the first one of which was in 1847. He was a trustee of the "Hebrew and English Institute of the City of Richmond", incorporated in 1848 but closed three years later "for want of proper patronage". He was also a trustee of the "Hebrew Beneficial Society" of Richmond, chartered in 1851.

In short, Jacob was "spokesman of the Jews of Richmond"; "he was prominently identified in all matters of Jewish interest" in Richmond. It is from his article "The Jews of Richmond" that we learn of their early history, since, as he tells us, records were lost in the Richmond fire of 1864. It was through his newspaper articles and other activities that a local ordinance prohibiting the breaking of Sabbath on Sunday was repealed; in 1849 "he had the state law so emended as to absolve those citizens who observed the Jewish Sabbath from any penalty for violating the Christian Sabbath". "In 1849 Ezekiel secured the enactment of a law by which religious organizations were invested with the rights of incorporated institutions."

Jacob received national publicity for two other incidents: he objected when President Tyler referred to the citizens of the United States as a "Christian people"; Tyler apologized. Also, he spoke out "effectively" against a treaty with Switzerland, preventing its ratification, and against accepting a block of Swiss granite for the Washington Monument, because of Swiss anti-Semitism.

Jacob's "business houses having been burnt", he found it advisable to leave Richmond. His last known advertisement for his business appeared in the January 27, 1867, issue of the Richmond Dispatch. In December 1867 he was a delegate representing Richmond in the Conservative Convention of Virginia, "the Convention of the white people of Virginia, who are the people of Virginia", whose stated "object" was "to organize a white man's party". On April 8, 1868, the family moved as a group to Cincinnati, where his daughter Hannah Workum, wife of wealthy businessman Levi J. Workum, in the wholesale liquor business, had been living for some years. (According to obituaries, Workum was "a model citizen" and "a liberal donor" to the Hebrew Union College; "his private benefactions were large".)

== In Cincinnati ==
Cincinnati at the time of Jacob's move there (1868) was the intellectual capital of American Judaism. Seat of the oldest Jewish congregation west of the Appalachian Mountains, in number of Jews it was second only to New York City. The first Jewish Hospital was there. The second Jewish newspaper in the history of the United States, The Israelite, had been published there since 1854. (The Asmonean, 1849–1858, was the first.) A Jewish printer, to become Bloch Publishing, was there as well. Efforts to create an association of all synagogues were centered there, and in 1873 the Union of American Hebrew Congregations came into existence. Finally, efforts were underway to create a Jewish university, including a rabbinical school; Hebrew Union College opened in 1875. The Manischevitz Company, which automated the manufacture of matzos and made them square, came slightly later, in 1888, and in 1889 the Central Conference of American Rabbis. From the beginning, the College solicited book donations, and it soon owned the largest collection of Jewish books in the world, today (2019) surpassed only by the National Library of Israel. There is a fourteen-page printed catalog of the books Ezekiel donated to the college in 1892.

At the center of this activity was America's most famous and controversial rabbi of the day, Isaac Meyer Wise, who was founder and editor of The Israelite and rabbi of the B'nai Yeshurun congregation from 1854 until his death in 1900. Ezekiel had written to Wise in 1855, expressing an interest in Wise's new and unsuccessful Zion Collegiate Institute project, "a university on the German model with a Jewish theological faculty". After moving to Cincinnati, Ezekiel became Secretary of the Board and Treasurer of Hebrew Union College, the new institution, fulfilling the functions of registrar, from its inception almost until his death.

In Cincinnati, Ezekiel again worked in the dry-goods business, according to the 1870 Census. He became a member of the Kahal Kadosh Bene (or Benai) Israel, whose rabbi was Max Lilienthal, "Corresponding Editor" of The Israelite. At the time of his golden wedding anniversary in 1885, his residence was described as "palatial". He had thirteen living children, thirty-nine grandchildren, and one great-grandchild.

In an editorial after his death, Wise said:

He was one of the very few men I have ever known whose presence in itself was a beneficence. He had merely to live; that in itself brought sunshine into the world of his associates. Even a transient meeting with him made men feel there is good in mankind. I never met him without being the better for it, and his kindly greeting and genial smile were always to me like a benison [blessing] from one I loved. A more gracious presence, and a more lovable nature have seldom been combined. His goodness made itself intuitively felt; and he had not even to speak, for his purity of heart and sincerity of mind seemed fairly to beam from his eyes. There may have been better men than Jacob Ezekiel, I presume he had his share of human frailties; but, I have never yet met another who could so impress the hallowing influence which true goodness inspires. His life was beautiful, and all who knew him are the better for that knowledge. Such a man does not die, as the world is forever brighter and better because of the life he lived in it.

== Writings ==
- Ezekiel, Jacob (1896). "The Jews of Richmond". Publications of the American Jewish Historical Society. Vol. 4. pp. 21–27. JSTOR 43057456.
- Ezekiel, Jacob (1900). "Persecution of the Jews in 1840". Publications of the American Jewish Historical Society. Vol. 8. pp. 141–145. JSTOR 43057569.

== Archival material ==
The American Jewish Archives, in Cincinnati, contains "Correspondence and scrapbooks covering the activities of Jacob Ezekiel and family. Included is material covering Hebrew Union College, Union of American Hebrew Congregations, and Hebrew Benevolent Society of Baltimore, Maryland; articles by Herbert T. Ezekiel; and Jacob Ezekiel's copybooks (1842). Correspondents include Isaac M. Wise, Marcus Jastrow, Frederick De Sola Mendes, and Henry Berkowitz."
