= Religious Liberty (Ezekiel) =

Sculpture by Moses Jacob Ezekiel

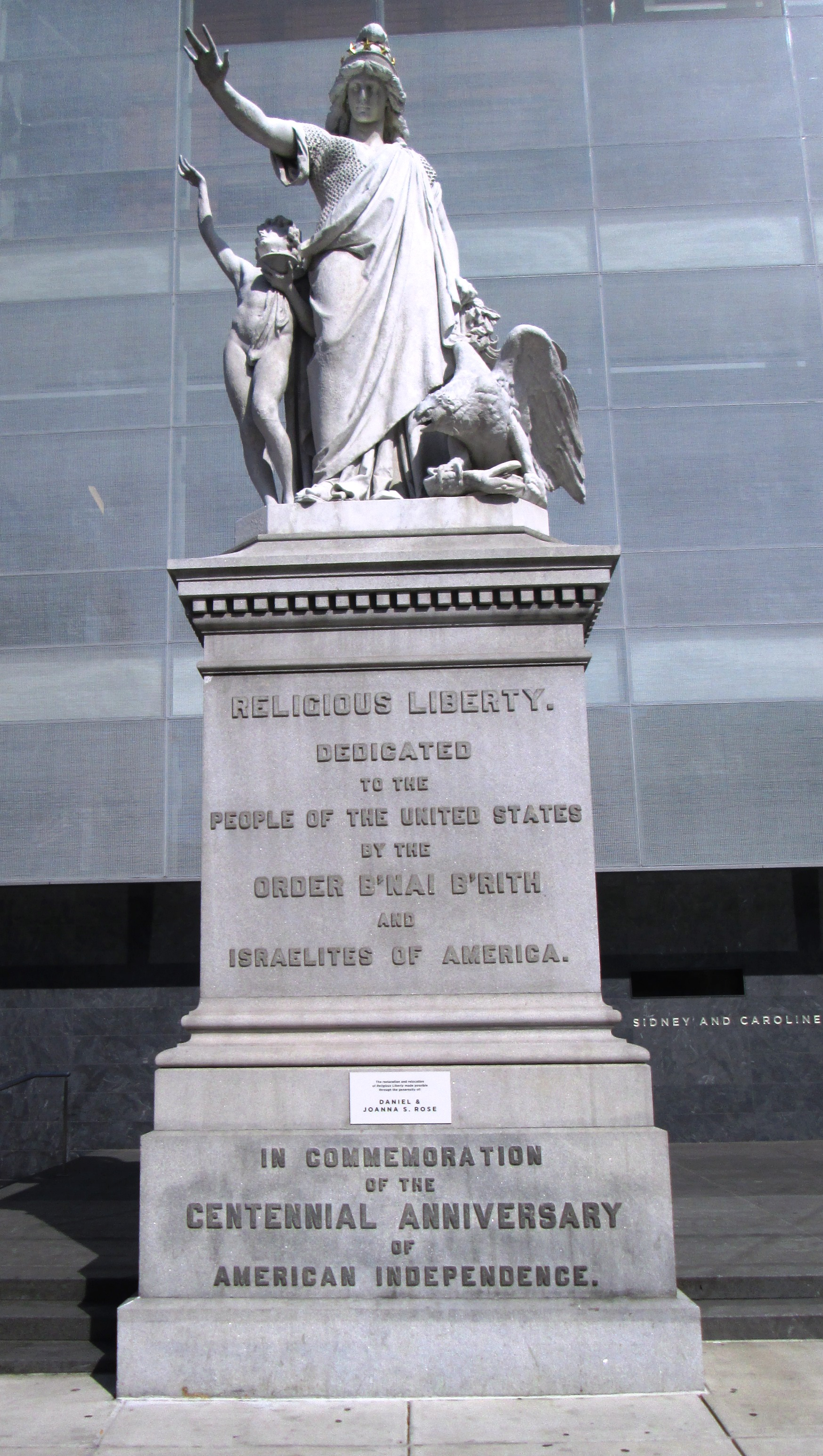
- Religious Liberty, by Moses Jacob Ezekiel, 1876
- Artist: Moses Jacob Ezekiel
- Medium: Marble
- Subject: Goddess of Liberty
- Dimensions: 3.4 m (11 ft)
- Weight: 26,000 pounds
- Location: National Museum of American Jewish History; Philadelphia; 39.95036°N 75.14880°W

Religious Liberty is a sculpture commissioned by B'nai B'rith and dedicated "to the people of the United States" as an expression of support for the Constitutional guarantee of religious freedom. It was created by Moses Jacob Ezekiel, a B'nai B'rith member and the first American Jewish sculptor to gain international prominence. The statue stands 11 feet (3.4 m) high, of marble, and the plinth (base) added another 14 feet (4.3 m). It weighs 26,000 pounds (12,000 kg), and was said to be the largest sculpture created in the 19th century. It was carved in Italy and shipped to Fairmount Park in Philadelphia for the nation's 1876 Centennial Exposition. It was later moved to Independence Mall and currently stands in front of the National Museum of American Jewish History.

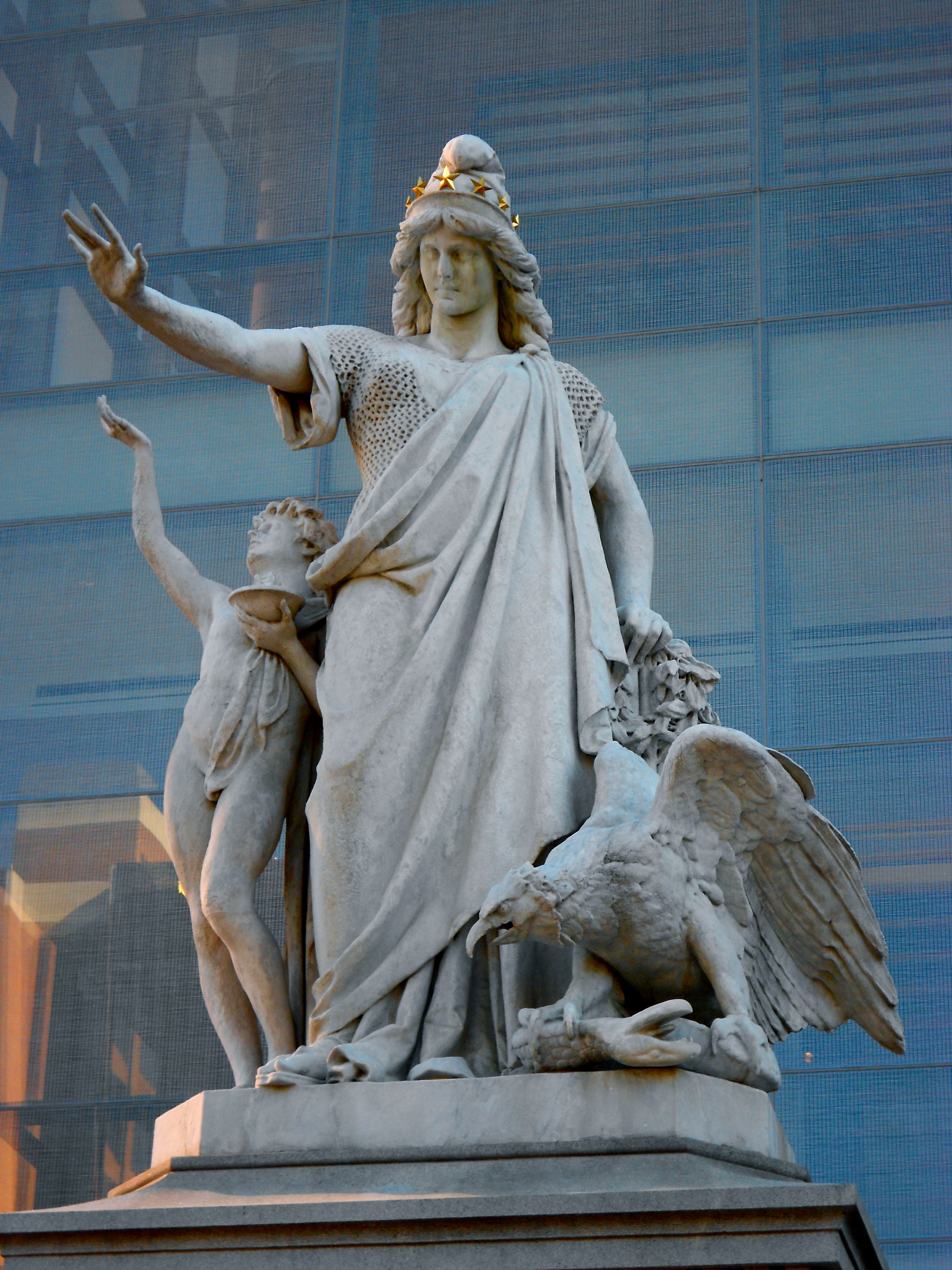
Sculpture of Religious Liberty by Moses Jacob Ezekiel, Philadelphia, 1876

== The meaning of the sculpture ==
It comprises four figures, the principal one representing the Goddess of Liberty, dressed in coat of mail and a mantle, with a shield, having the American flag in relief on her breast. The Phrygian cap on he[r] head is bordered in front with thirteen stars of solid gold. Her right hand rests upon the fasces, the scroll of the constitution and wreath of laurel; her left is extended in gesture, waving off all interference. Under her protecting right arm stands Faith, symbolized by a nude boy, whose head and right hand are raised appealingly to heaven, and whose left hand holds close to Liberty's breast a vessel in which is burning the undying flame of Religion. At the feet of the Goddess, on her left, is Intolerance, represented by a monstrous serpent, part of the body of which is coiled around the fasces, while its head protrudes with gaping jaws from under the garment of Liberty. With outstretched wings, fierce bearing and its talons buried in the neck of the serpent, is the American eagle.

== Creation of the sculpture ==
In his Memoirs, Ezekiel described how the block of marble occupied two freight cars, and took twenty men "several days" to move it from the railway station to his studio, the iron chain of a derrick having snapped. "A great deal of street paving" was necessary afterwards, to repair the damage. He had to knock down part of a wall to get it in his studio, and break it down again to get it out. When it was completed, which took two teams of stonecutters, one working during the day and one at night, for one day he invited the Roman public to see it. He wrote that it made him famous overnight; one newspaper said that it "was perhaps the most important work of art that had been produced in centuries." It led to Ezekiel's introduction to Giuseppe Garibaldi.

== Financial problems ==
The commission was for $20,000 (equivalent to $604,688 in 2025). According to Ezekiel, before obtaining the marble a letter from B'nai Brith informed him that they were unable to raise the money to pay him, and he should abandon the project. Nevertheless, having created the clay model, and this being the first ever Jewish commission for a sculpture, with a guaranteed place at the Centennial Exposition, he decided to continue work. He had to borrow money to pay for its transportation to Philadelphia himself. He did not receive payment until three years afterward, and when the loans and interest had been paid there was nothing left for him.

Documents concerning the commission are held in the B'nai B'rith archives. A program from the ceremonial unveiling is held by the National Museum of American Jewish History.
