= Martha Parke Custis =

Stepdaughter of George Washington and daughter of Martha Washington

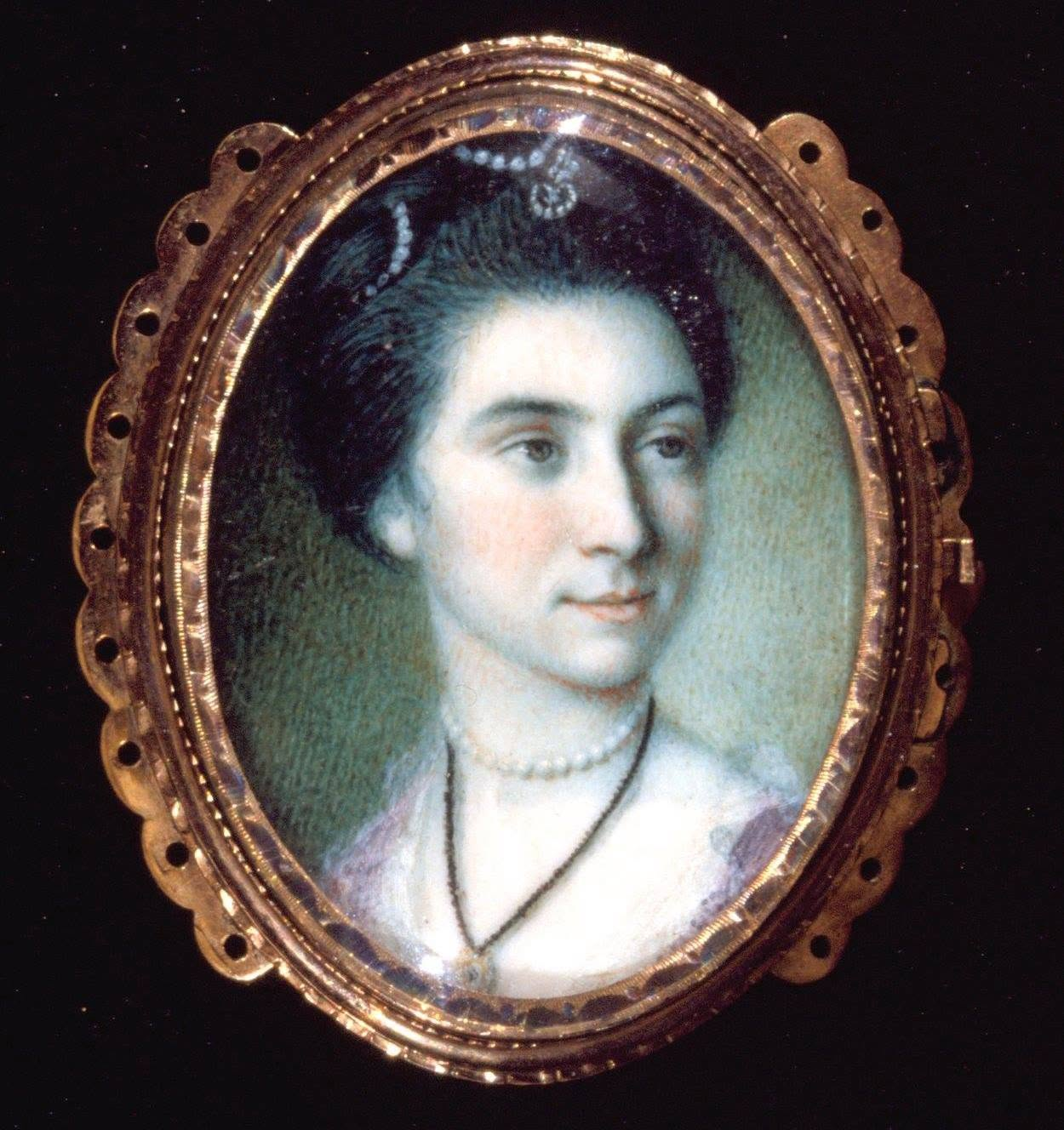
- Portrait by Charles Willson Peale, 1772
- Born: 1756; White House Plantation, New Kent County, Virginia, British America
- Died: June 19, 1773 (aged 17); Mount Vernon, Fairfax County, Virginia, British America
- Resting place: Mount Vernon, Fairfax County, Virginia, U.S.
- Other name: Patsy Custis
- Parents: Daniel Parke Custis; Martha Dandridge
- Relatives: John Parke Custis (brother); Elizabeth Custis Law (niece); Martha Parke Custis Peter (niece); Eleanor Parke Custis Lewis (niece); George Washington Parke Custis (nephew)

Martha Parke Custis (1756 – June 19, 1773) was a stepdaughter of George Washington who died from an epileptic seizure at the age of 17, fifteen years before he was elected as the first president of the United States. She was the youngest child of Martha Custis, who later became known as Martha Washington, and Daniel Parke Custis, who died one year after she was born. She was called "Patsy" by her family.

Analysis of George Washington's diary entries describing Patsy Custis's seizures and the treatments she received have led modern medical historians to conclude that the cause of death was SUDEP, or sudden unexpected death in epilepsy. Her death is considered one of the first well-documented descriptions in history of SUDEP by a witness, who happened to be George Washington.

== Early life ==
Martha Parke "Patsy" Custis was born in 1756 at White House Plantation in Virginia. She was the fourth child of Martha Washington (née Dandridge) and Colonel Daniel Parke Custis. Her eldest brother Daniel Jr. had died at the age of three, before she was born, while her sister Frances died in 1757 at the age of four; both had died of unknown causes. Her father died on July 8, 1757, possibly from a virulent throat infection.

George Washington began courting Martha, who had become one of the wealthiest women in Virginia, in 1758. They married on January 6, 1759, making Patsy, age two, and her brother John "Jacky" Parke Custis, age four, stepchildren of George Washington. As the Washingtons entered into public life together, Martha Washington came to be known by her formal name, while her daughter and namesake was known as "Patsy".

Washington wrote that his role as a stepfather was to be "generous and attentive", and family friends viewed both Martha and George as indulging parents. Patsy herself was a wealthy heiress, with a share of the Custis estate managed by Washington in a guardian account. He recorded purchases of a tortoiseshell comb, gold earrings, a silk coat, black-and-white satin pumps, a pet parrot, and a spinet for her, as well as payment for music lessons. Every year, he ordered a new doll for her, dressed according to the latest fashions in London.

== Epilepsy and treatments ==
Her epilepsy began around the age of five or six. (Note: Some writers have suggested that Patsy's "fitts & fevours" in 1760 were unconnected with epilepsy, given the lack of other records expressing concern, or referring to visits by doctors. See Brady, p. 245.) On September 26, 1760, Martha Washington wrote in a letter that "my dear little girl is much better she has lost her fitts & fevours [sic] both and seems to be getting well very fast". On June 26, 1761, she wrote that she had given Patsy mercury and that it had "worked twice". There are no records of other episodes until January 1768, when she suffered a violent seizure as she was approaching the age of 12. At that time, Patsy fell to the floor while her mother and stepfather were having tea. Dr. William Rumney, a retired surgeon from Alexandria, prescribed "12 powders of unidentified composition, a vial of 'Nervous Drops' and a package of valerian". Her condition had improved by the next morning.

From 1768 onward, her seizures became more frequent and more violent, requiring her mother to look after her full time, and Patsy herself wrote in 1769 that some activities were difficult for her. Rather than keeping her seizures secret, the Washingtons were open about them, which was unusual at the time, and tried to help Patsy live the same kind of life as other girls her age, entertaining friends at Mount Vernon or visiting Williamsburg.

The Washingtons consulted at least seven physicians to treat Patsy, and tried a wide range of treatments. Between February 1768 and June 1772, she was treated regularly for her seizures by Dr. Rumney, who came to Mount Vernon at least ten times. Her other primary physician was Dr. John Johnson of Maryland, who visited only once or twice, but regularly sent medicines from Annapolis in the 1770s. Other doctors who treated her included Hugh Mercer of Fredricksburg, George Steptoe of Westmoreland County, John de Sequeyra, William Pasteur, and Arthur Lee.

Patsy was regularly prescribed herbal remedies and antispasmodic medications including valerian and musk, which did not seem to provide relief. Over time, she was also given ether, powders, "nervous drops", "a large juleep", Peruvian bark or cinchona, plasters of unknown composition, factitious cinnabar, and other decoctions. She took mercury, which was poisonous but often prescribed at the time, as well as purging pills, and also underwent bleeding treatments.

On February 16, 1769, the Washingtons paid blacksmith Joshua Evans to put an "iron ring" on Patsy's finger, based on an English folk belief that a "cramp ring" would alleviate seizures, but it soon became evident that it did not work. In the summer of 1769, the Washingtons took Patsy to the "healing" waters of Berkeley Springs, West Virginia, which did not help her, although it resulted in an introduction to Dr. Johnson through his brother whom they met at the warm springs.

In 1770, Washington kept a record of Patsy's seizures in the margins of his almanac. Between June 29 and September 22 that year, Washington logged 26 seizures, with as many as two in one day. He used notation such as "very bad fit", "1 fit", and "1/2 fit", which may have represented partial seizures. Despite the increase in the number of seizures, the Washingtons encouraged Patsy to keep up her routine activities as much as possible, including playing music and singing for guests at Mount Vernon.

In 1772, Dr. Johnson wrote to Martha Washington that he believed Patsy's condition would improve through "regular moderate exercise", "temperate living", and keeping her body "cool and open" by taking "Barley Water and light cooling Food".

== Death ==
The weather in Virginia was volatile in the summer of 1773, with snow on June 11 and "exceedingly hot" temperatures on June 17. According to George Washington, at a family gathering at Mount Vernon on June 19, Patsy "rose from Dinner about four o'clock in better health and spirits than she appeared to have been for some time." Family letters written by others who were present have provided additional details. Patsy was having a quiet conversation with her brother's fiancée, Eleanor Calvert, after dinner when she went to her room to retrieve a letter from Jacky, who was attending college in New York. Eleanor heard a noise coming from Patsy's room to find her in the midst of a seizure – which Washington described as "one of her usual Fits" – after which she was moved into her bed. Within two minutes, wrote Washington, Patsy was dead "without uttering a word, a groan, or scarce a sigh".

Patsy Custis died at around five o'clock on June 19, 1773, at the age of 17. In a letter to her brother Jacky, George Washington wrote, "yesterday removed the Sweet Innocent Girl into a more happy and peaceful abode than any she has met with in the afflicted Path she hitherto has trod." Washington referred to the family's "distress" and described "This sudden, and unexpected blow" as having reduced Martha "to the lowest ebb of Misery". Given the extremely hot weather, Patsy needed to be buried the following day. A coffin was built overnight by a carpenter from Alexandria; a funeral service was read at Mount Vernon by Reverend Lee Massey, rector of Truro Parish; and Custis was buried "in an old brick vault close to the river".

== Retrospective diagnosis ==
In 1999, an article in Epilepsia noted that the Washingtons' correspondence and diary entries from 1760 and 1770 described Patsy's "fits and fever". Authors DeToledo, DeToledo, and Lowe raised that it was unclear "whether Patsy had a febrile illness that increased her predisposition for seizures or whether she had prolonged seizures that resulted in elevation of body temperature", but suggested that the latter was more likely. As circumstantial evidence, they pointed out that "the periods of increased seizures spanned over several months"; that "the remedies prescribed to her during these episodes were aimed at the treatment of seizures and not fever"; and that "she seemed to have protracted postictal states, suggesting that convulsions were prolonged".

In 2004, neurologist Michael J. Doherty wrote in Epilepsy & Behavior that "It is exceedingly uncommon for patients with epilepsy, regardless if they had a seizure or not, to be dead within 2 minutes of appearing normal." In Doherty's assessment, Custis's death was a case of sudden unexpected death in epilepsy, noting that "patients with refractory epilepsy are more likely to die of SUDEP." He argued that her death may be "one of the first well-documented, witnessed descriptions of SUDEP, unwittingly penned by George Washington."

== See also ==
- Epilepsy#History
- Sudden unexpected death in epilepsy
