= Congregation Beth Ahabah =

Jewish body in Richmond, Virginia

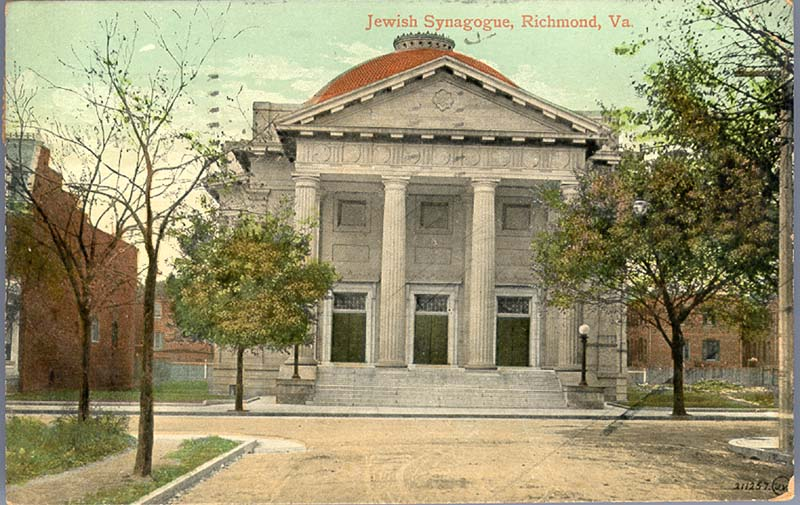
- Early 20th century postcard of the current synagogue

- Location in Virginia

Religion
- Affiliation: Reform Judaism
- Ecclesiastical or organisational status: Synagogue
- Status: Active

Location
- Location: 1121 West Franklin Street, Richmond, Virginia
- Country: United States
- Coordinates: 37°33′05″N 77°27′20″W

Architecture
- Architects: Noland and Baskervill
- Type: Synagogue
- Style: Roman Revival
- Established: 1789 (as Kahal Kadosh Beth Shalome)
- Groundbreaking: March 4, 1904
- Completed: December 9, 1904

Specifications
- Dome: One
- Materials: Stone

Website
- bethahabah.org
- Congregation Beth Ahabah
- U.S. National Register of Historic Places
- U.S. Historic district – Contributing property
- NRHP reference No.: 72001528

Significant dates
- Added to NRHP: September 14, 1972
- Designated CP: West Franklin Street Historic District

Congregation Beth Ahabah (meaning "House of Love") is a Reform Jewish synagogue at 1121 West Franklin Street, Richmond, Virginia, in the United States. Founded in 1789 by Spanish and Portuguese Jews as Kahal Kadosh Beth Shalome (meaning "Holy Congregation, House of Peace"), it is one of the oldest synagogues in the United States.

== History ==
When the congregation was founded, there were 100 Jews in Richmond's population of 3,900. After meeting for some years in leased space, the congregation built its first synagogue in 1822. It was a handsome, if modest, one-story brick building in Georgian style.

The community grew and in 1841 the Ashkenazi members founded a new congregation called Beth Ahabah. In 1846 Beth Ahabah established the first Jewish school in Richmond, and 1846 built a synagogue at Eleventh and Marshall Streets. The Congregation moved toward Reform in 1867 with discussion of acquiring an organ, the decision to switch to family pews (mixing men and women) and allowing women to join the choir. Beth Ahabah joined the Reform Movement Union of American Hebrew Congregations in 1875. A new building was erected, also at Eleventh and Marshall, in 1880. In 1898 K.K. Beth Shalome formally merged with Congregation Beth Ahabah.

On March 4, 1904 the congregation laid the cornerstone for its present building, known as the Franklin Street Synagogue. The building was dedicated on December 9, 1904. The domed, Neoclassical synagogue was designed by the Richmond-based firm of Noland and Baskervill (now Baskervill), who also designed nearby St. James' Church and the wings of the Virginia State Capitol. The synagogue has 29 stained glass windows. Most notable is a window on the building's eastern wall created and signed by the Louis Comfort Tiffany Studios in 1923. It depicts Mt. Sinai.

The congregation maintains the Hebrew Cemetery of Richmond, including the Cemetery for Hebrew Confederate Soldiers, as well as the original site of the 1789 Franklin Street Burial Grounds, which was the first Jewish cemetery in Virginia.

== Beth Ahabah Museum ==
Congregation Beth Ahabah is the home of the Beth Ahabah Museum & Archives, located at 1109 West Franklin Street. Established in 1977, the museum's focus is the history and culture of Richmond's Jewish community and the Southern Jewish experience. Three galleries feature changing exhibits. The museum is open from Sunday through Thursday.

== Notable members ==
- Bret Myers (born 1980), soccer player and professor
