= John de Sequeyra =

Portuguese-born American physician and writer (1712–1795)

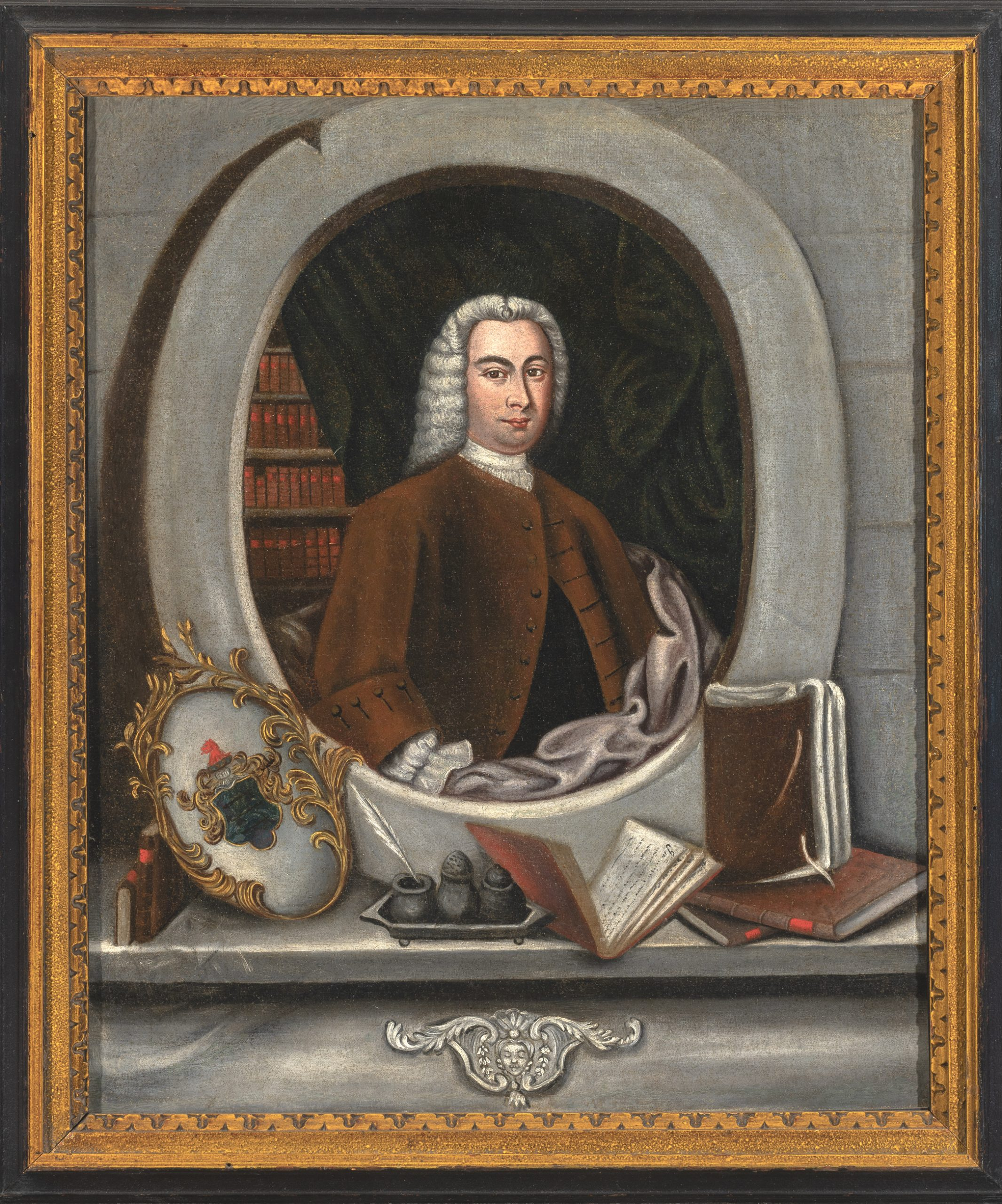
- Portrait attributed to William Dering, c. 1745–49
- Born: João de Sequeira c. 1712; Lisbon, Portugal
- Died: 1795 (aged 82–83); Virginia, United States
- Occupations: Physician, writer

John de Sequeyra (c. 1712 – c. 1795) was a Portuguese-born American physician and writer. Born in Lisbon into a Portuguese Jewish family, he moved to the British colony of Virginia in 1745 and earned a living practising medicine. Sequeyra was the author of a group of writings on the various diseases in Virginia and the first visiting physician of the Hospital for the Maintenance of Idiots, Lunatics, and Persons of Insane or Disordered Minds in Williamsburg, Virginia.

== Family and early life ==
João de Sequeira was born in Lisbon around 1712 into a New Christian family from Rio de Janeiro. His father was Francisco Machado de Sequeira (later Abraham de Sequeira Machado), a physician who was arrested in Rio de Janeiro in 1706 and taken to Lisbon two years later. His Inquisition's trial lasted until June 1709. Francisco Machado de Sequeira moved to London in the early 1730s, where he was circumcised and took a Jewish name, Abraham de Sequeira Machado. Sequeira Machado became a member of Bevis Marks Synagogue in London.

== Medical career ==
Sequeyra studied medicine in the University of Leiden beginning in 1736 and received his degree in 1739 with a dissertation entitled "De Peripneumonia vera", which he dedicated to his older brother "Joseph Henry de Siqueyra, M.D., physician to the Portuguese in the East Indies and chief physicist to the Viceroy of Goa". In 1745, he moved to Williamsburg, Virginia, where he practiced medicine. Between 1745 and 1781 he compiled a manuscript entitled "Diseases in Virginia." He was a physician who attended about 85 households during a smallpox epidemic of 1747/8.

In 1769, Colonel George Washington, as he was known then, frequently called in Dr. Sequeyra to treat his stepdaughter "Patsy," daughter of Martha Park Custis. Patsy suffered from increasingly debilitating epileptic seizures which eventually led to her death. In 1773, the first insane asylum in the Thirteen Colonies, the Hospital for the Maintenance of Idiots, Lunatics, and Persons of Insane or Disordered Minds, was built in Williamsburg, Virginia, and it remains in operation to this day. Dr. John de Sequeyra was the first visiting physician attached to the facility. In 1774, he became one of the directors of the hospital. So accomplished in caring for the residents, was Dr. Sequeyra, that when he retired in 1795 it took two doctors to back-fill his position.

== Tomatoes ==
John Hill once wrote – "Those who are us'd to eat with the Portuguese Jews know the value of it"; he was speaking of the tomato. John Custis IV, a Williamsburg resident, sent a letter to Peter Collinson, in 1741, inquiring about this thing called a "tomato". Tomatoes made their way to Colonial America by way of the West Indies Slave Trade – it was a staple food of the slaves who learned to discern the poisonous varieties from the edible varieties.

Thomas Jefferson himself informs us that introduction of the tomato as an edible fruit is due to the work of Dr. John de Sequeyra.

== Works ==
Three writings on medical matters written by Sequeira are known, which remained in manuscript until the 20th century. One is an annual report on the diseases in Virginia, published by Harold Gill in 1972. Six years later, Gill published another Sequeira's writing on the same subject, a king of a short summary of the annual reports. In 1997, Sarah McEntee wrote a BA thesis on Sequeyra and included the transcription of a third manuscript, a list of prevailing diseases in Virginia, including their description, symptoms and therapies.
