= The Vision of Endymion =

Painting by Edward Poynter

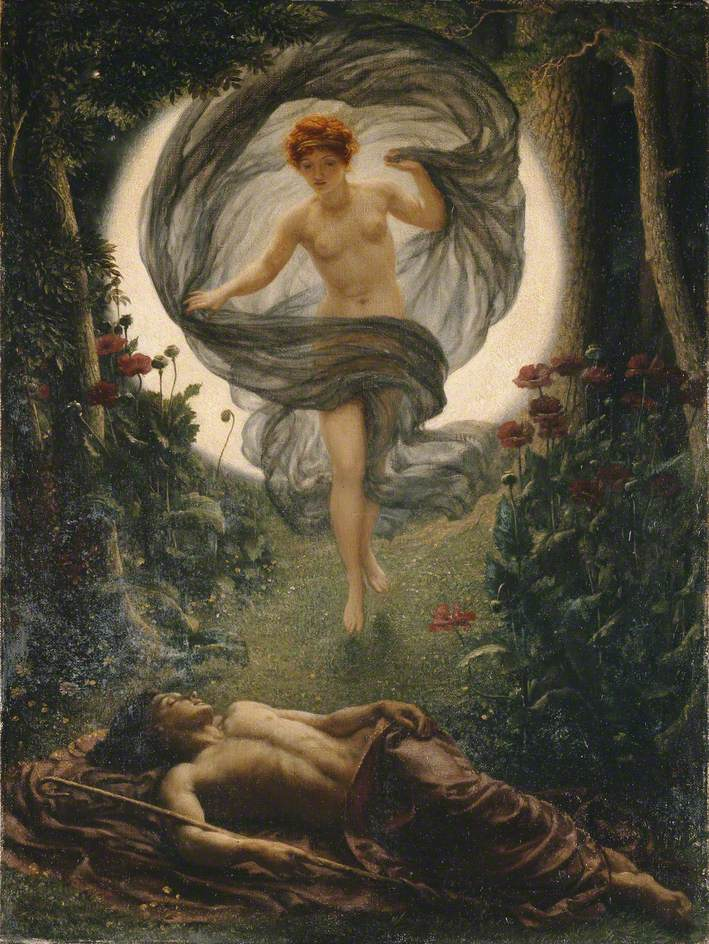
- Artist: Edward Poynter
- Year: 1902
- Medium: Oil on canvas, history painting
- Dimensions: 50.8 cm × 38.1 cm (20.0 in × 15.0 in)
- Location: Manchester Art Gallery, Greater Manchester

The Vision of Endymion is a 1902 history painting by the British artist Edward Poynter. Depicting a scene from Greek mythology, it shows the shepherd Endymion asleep on Mount Latmus as Diana approaches and falls in love with him.

Poynter was at the time President of the Royal Academy, having succeeded John Everett Millais in 1896. It was displayed at the Royal Academy Exhibition of 1902 at Burlington House in London. The painting was acquired by the Manchester Art Gallery in 1904 and remains in its collection. A 1913 version of the painting is in the Bristol Museum and Art Gallery.

== Bibliography ==
- Kestner, Joseph A. Mythology and Misogyny: The Social Discourse of Nineteenth-century British Classical-subject Painting. University of Wisconsin Press, 1989.
