= Portrait of the Duchess of Portland =

Painting by John Singer Sargent

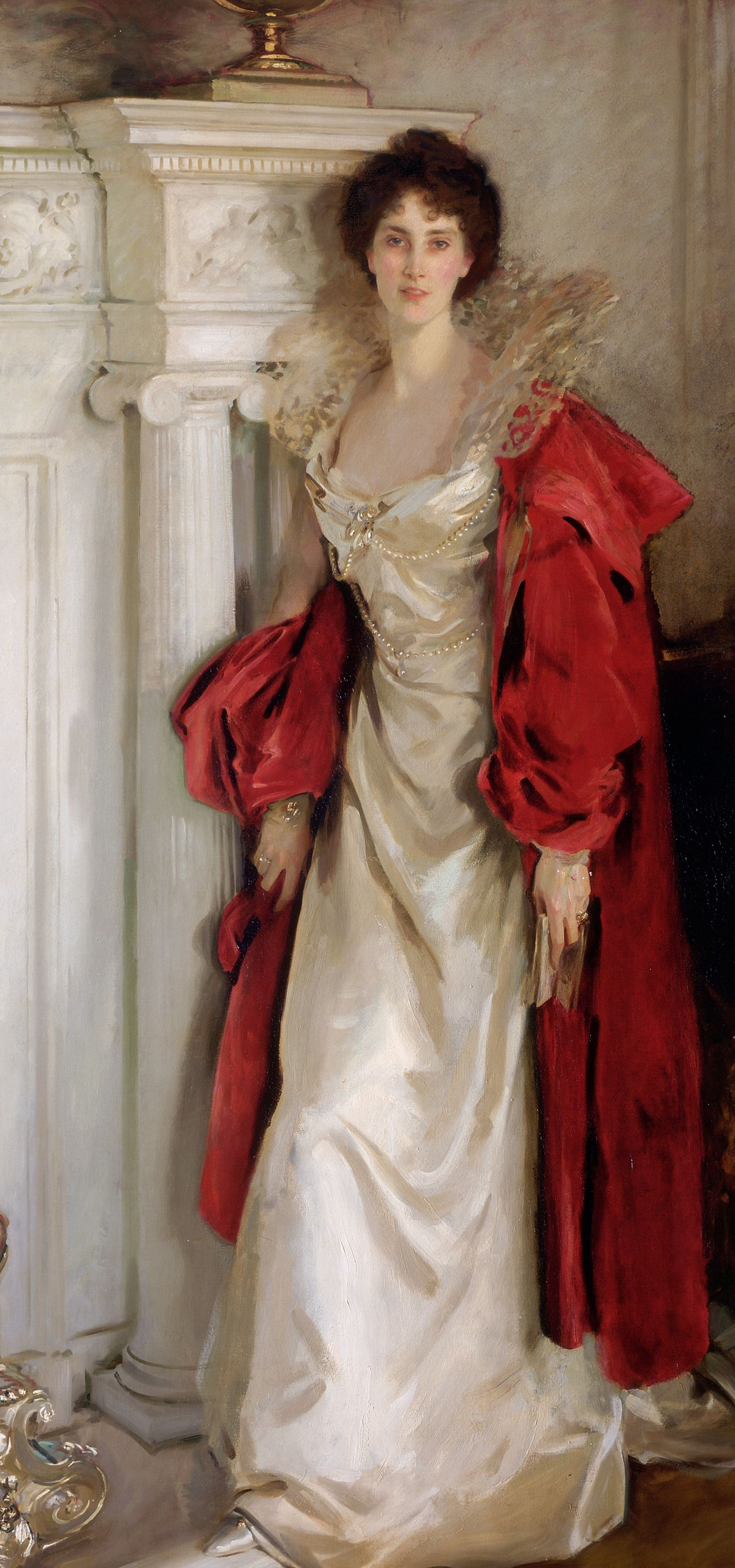
- Artist: John Singer Sargent
- Year: 1902
- Type: Oil on canvas, portrait painting
- Location: Welbeck Abbey, Nottinghamshire

Portrait of the Duchess of Portland is a 1902 portrait painting by the Anglo-American artist John Singer Sargent. It depicts the British aristocrat Winifred Cavendish-Bentinck, Duchess of Portland, particularly noted for her animal welfare activism. She is shown at full-length in the fashionable style of the Edwardian era. It was produced at the Duchess' country residence of Welbeck Abbey in Nottinghamshire rather than at Singer Sargent's studio. The painting was commissioned by her husband the Duke of Portland as a companion picture to his own 1900 portrait by the artist. The picture was displayed at the Royal Academy Exhibition of 1902 held at Burlington House in London. It remains part of the Portland Collection today.

== See also ==
- List of works by John Singer Sargent

== Bibliography ==
- Hall, Michael. Treasures of the Portland Collection. Harley Foundation, 2016.
- Lomax, James & Ormond, Richard. John Singer Sargent and the Edwardian Age. Leeds Art Galleries, 1979.
- Ratcliff, Carter. John Singer Sargent. Phaidon, 1983.
