= Three Ladies Adorning a Term of Hymen =

Painting by Joshua Reynolds

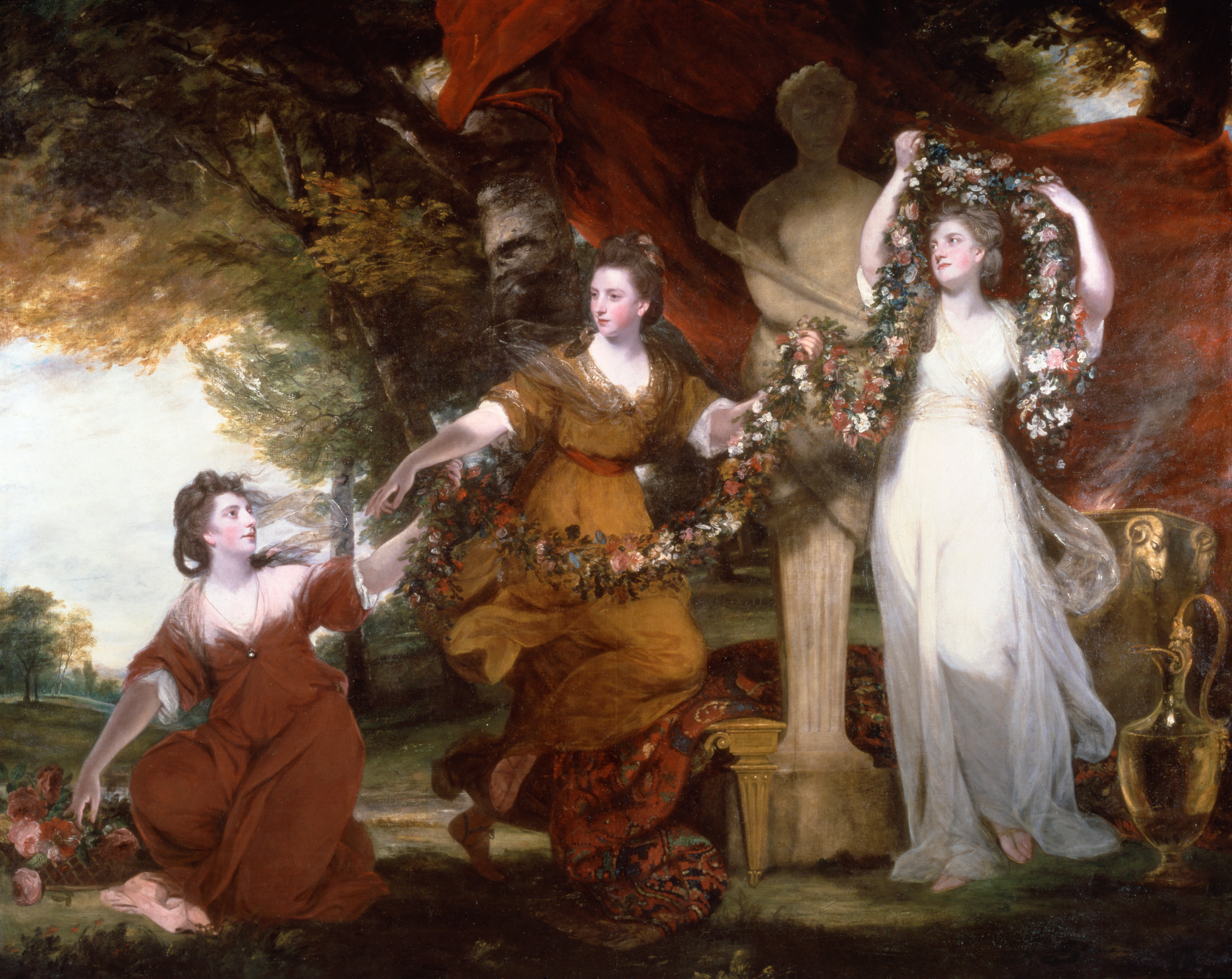
- Artist: Joshua Reynolds
- Year: 1773
- Type: Oil on canvas, portrait painting
- Dimensions: 237.7 cm × 290.8 cm (93.6 in × 114.5 in)
- Location: Tate Britain; London

Three Ladies Adorning a Term of Hymen is a 1773 portrait painting by the British artist Joshua Reynolds. It depicts Barbara, Elizabeth and Anne the three daughters of the Irish politician Sir William Montgomery. They are shown adorning a statue of Hymen with a garland of flowers, thereby symbolising their desirability for marriage. Their depictions echo that of the Three Graces and the work is sometimes known as The Irish Graces.

The picture was displayed at the Royal Academy Exhibition of 1774 at Somerset House in London. In 1837 the painting was given to the National Gallery as part of the bequest of the Irish peer the Earl of Blessington. Today it is in the collection of the Tate Britain in Pimlico. John Singer Sargent drew on the composition of the painting for his 1902 work The Acheson Sisters.

== Bibliography ==
- Cohen, Michael. Sisters: Relation and Rescue in Nineteenth-century British Novels and Paintings. Fairleigh Dickinson University Press, 1995.
- Wendorf, Richard. Sir Joshua Reynolds: The Painter in Society. Harvard University Press, 1998.
- Wood, Gillen D'Arcy. The Shock of the Real: Romanticism and Visual Culture, 1760–1860. Palgrave, 2001.
