= Royal Academy Exhibition of 1902 =

1902 art exhibition in London

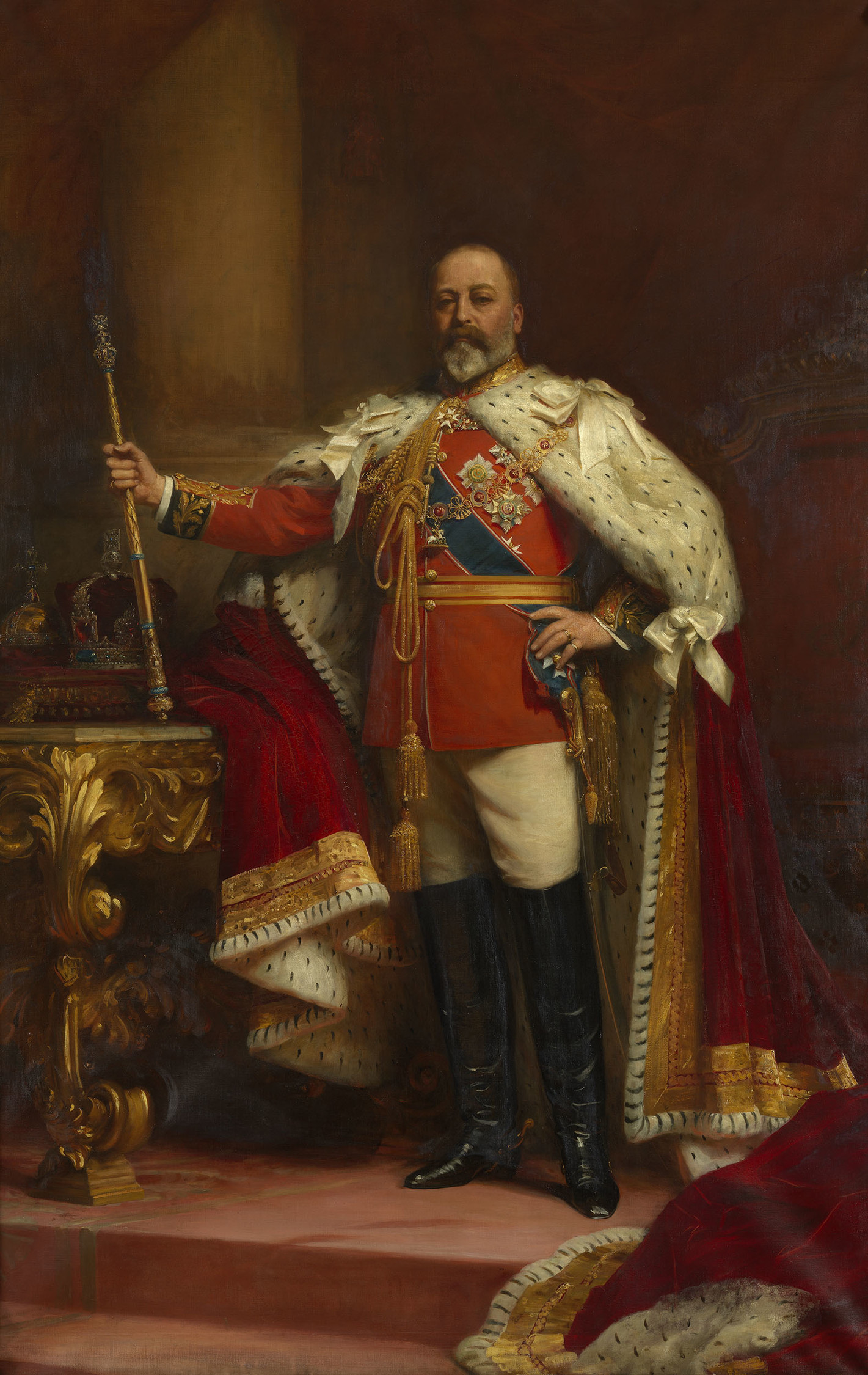
Coronation Portrait of Edward VII by Luke Fildes

The Royal Academy Exhibition of 1902 was the hundred and thirty forth annual Summer Exhibition of the British Royal Academy of Arts which was held at Burlington House in London's Piccadilly from 5 May to 4 August 1902. It marked the first full exhibition of the Edwardian era, as the previous Exhibition of 1901 had been overshadowed by mourning for Queen Victoria.

A centrepiece of the exhibition was the Coronation Portrait of Edward VII by Luke Fildes which showed the new monarch in his full regalia and had been painted during the winter months. The slightly delayed Coronation of Edward VII and Alexandra took place on 9 August, just after the Exhibition had closed. Another well-received painting of the king displayed was The Reception of the Moorish Ambassador by Edward VII at St James's Palace by John Seymour Lucas.

In general, the exhibition was noted for its portraiture, which was seen to return to the dominance it had shown during the eighteenth century and Regency era. In particular John Singer Sargent displayed eight portraits. These included The Acheson Sisters and Lord Ribblesdale. It was the last time works by the animal painter Thomas Sidney Cooper featured. He had displayed paintings at the Royal Academy for seventy consecutive exhibitions since the Royal Academy Exhibition of 1833.

Alfred Munnings displayed his breakthrough work The Vagabonds, later described as his magnum opus. Walter Langley of the Newlyn School of artists displayed A Cornish Idyll. The veteran of the Victorian era William Powell Frith displayed a genre painting In the Conservatory.

== Gallery ==
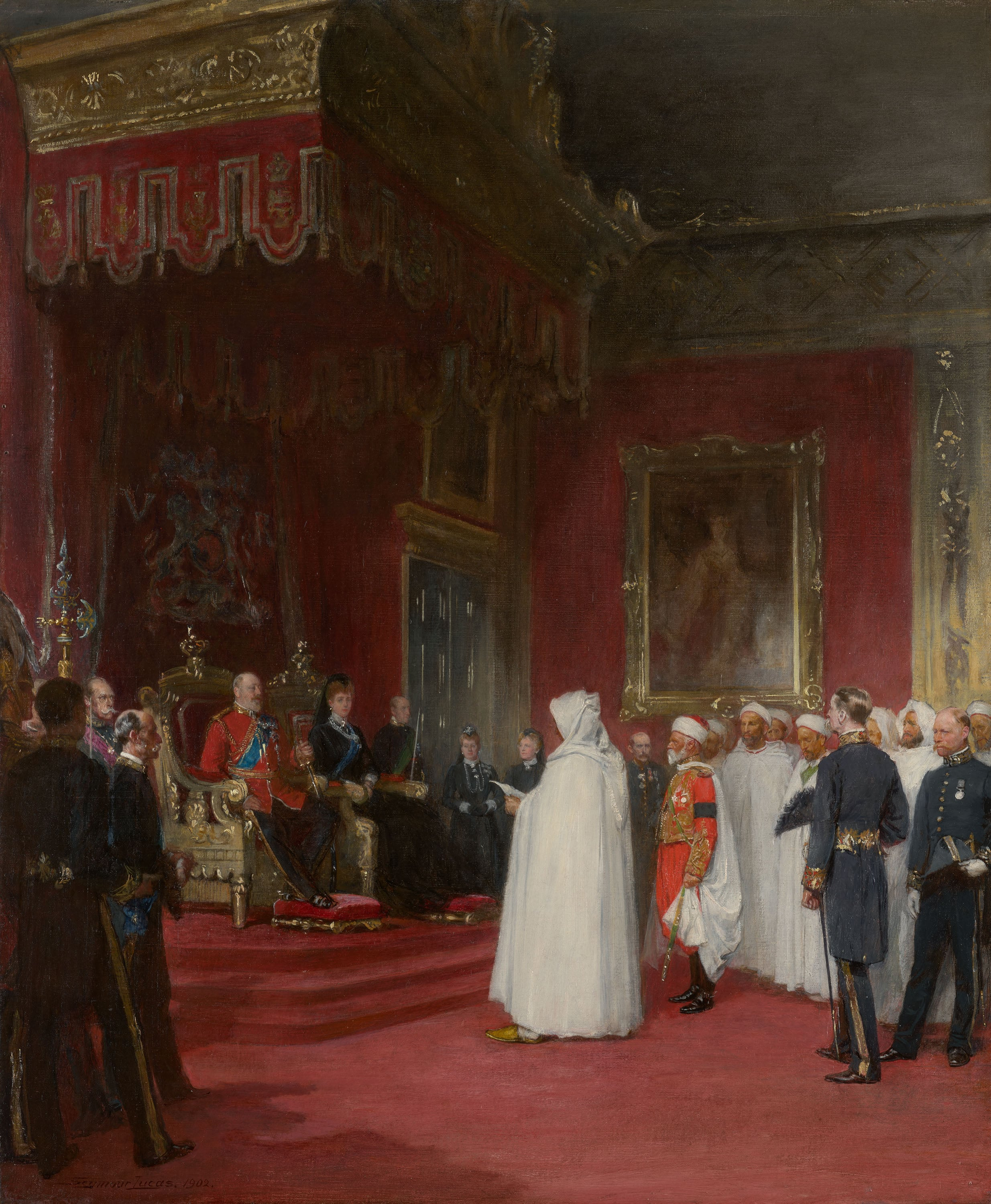
The Reception of the Moorish Ambassador by Edward VII at St James's Palace by John Seymour Lucas

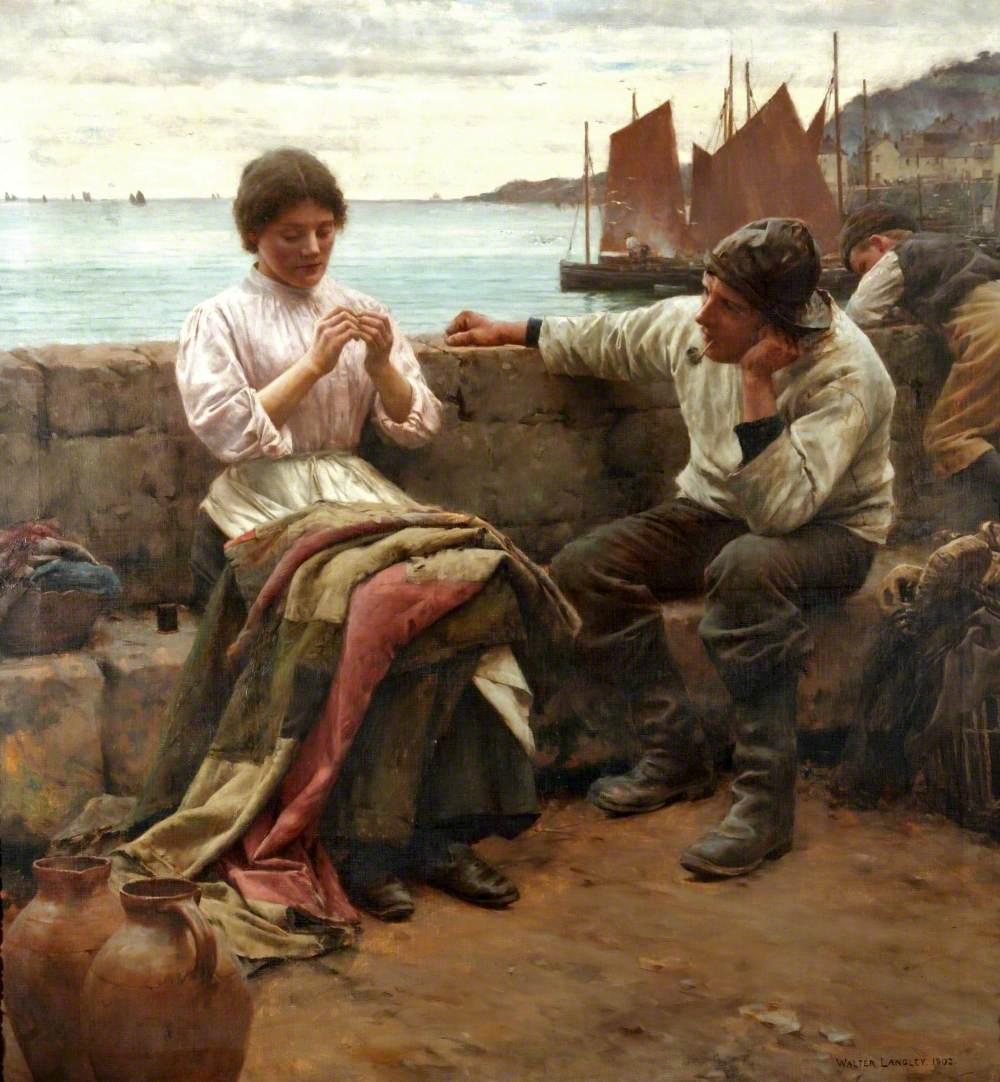
A Cornish Idyll by Walter Langley

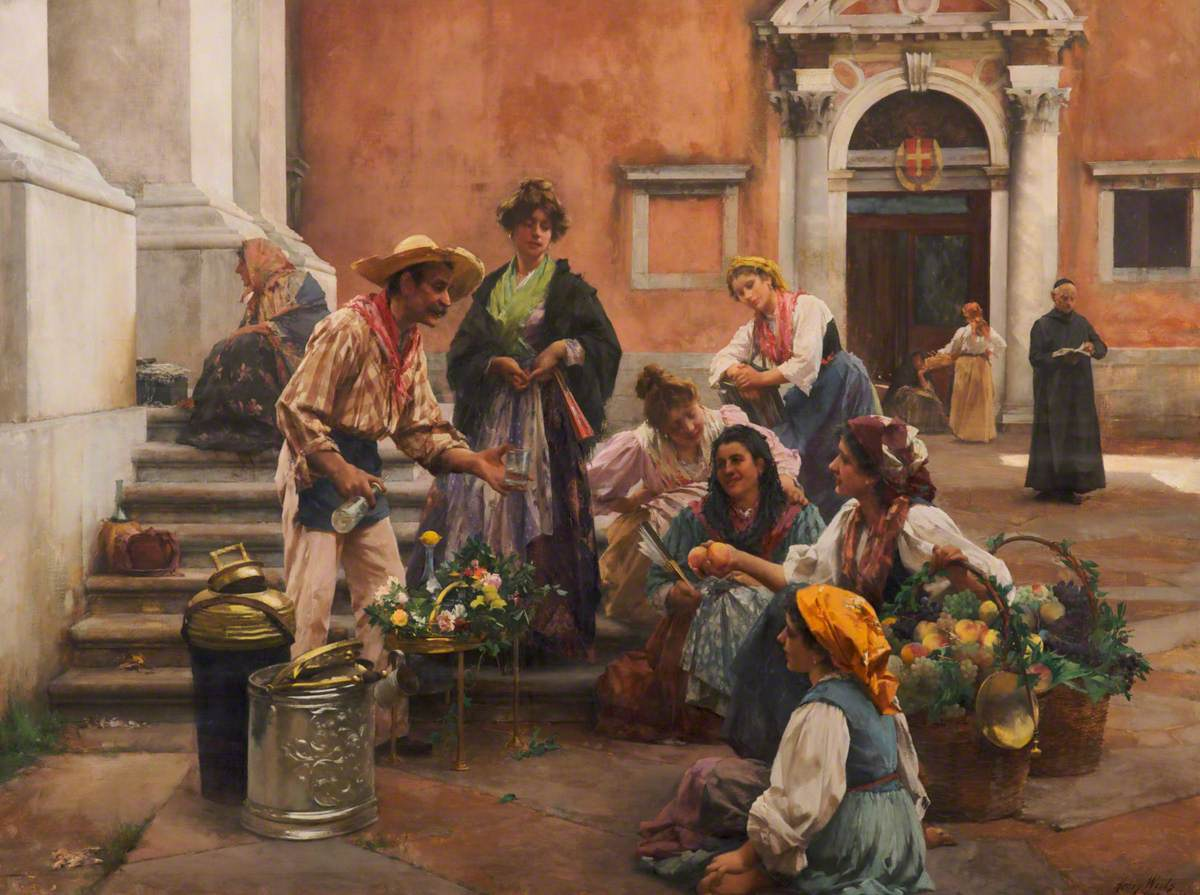
A Venetian Water Seller by Henry Woods

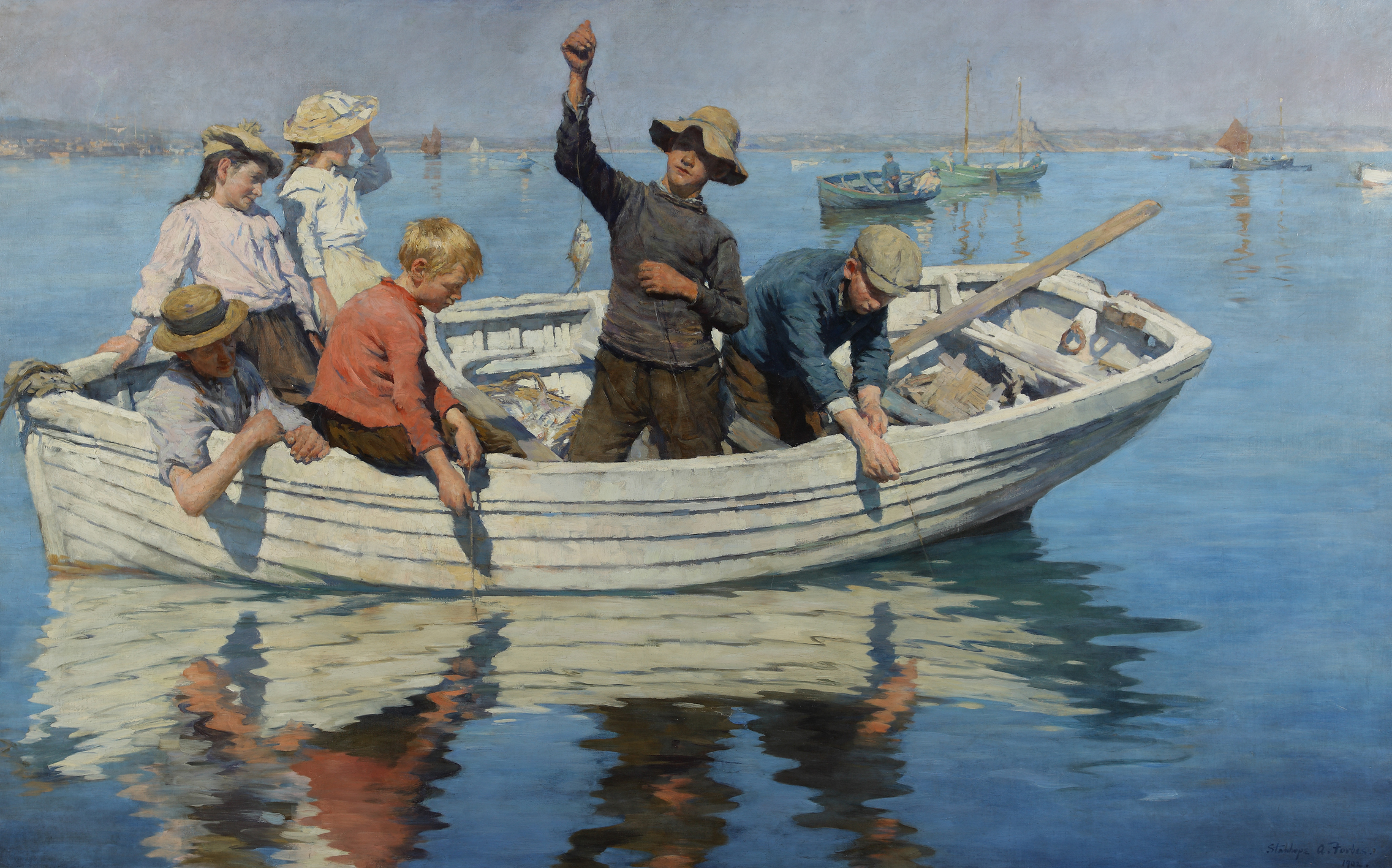
Chadding in Mount's Bay by Stanhope Forbes

Lighting Up Time by Stanhope Forbes

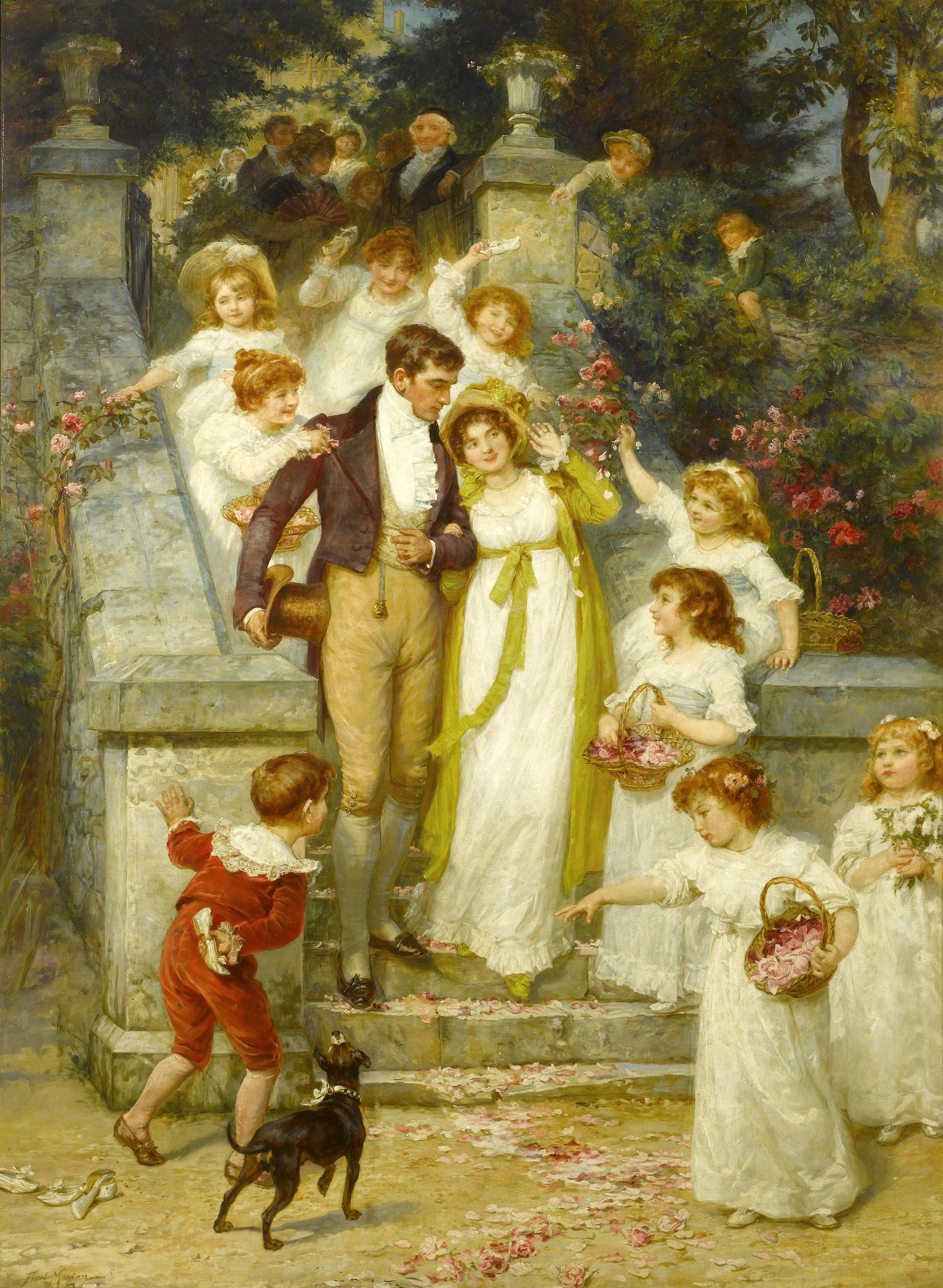
Off for the Honeymoon by Frederick Morgan

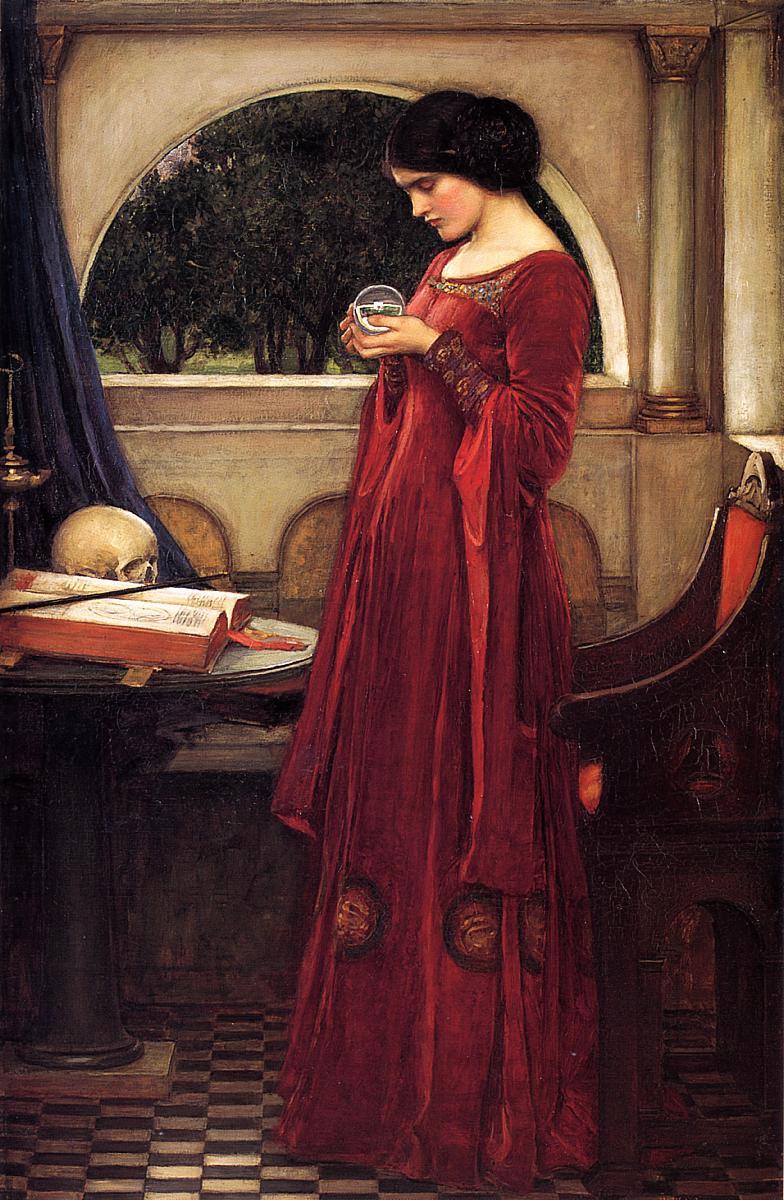
The Crystal Ball by John William Waterhouse

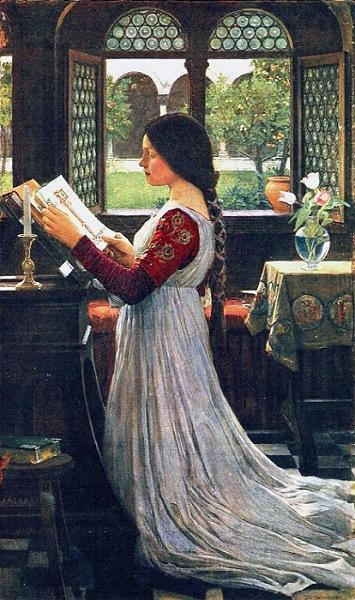
The Missal by John William Waterhouse

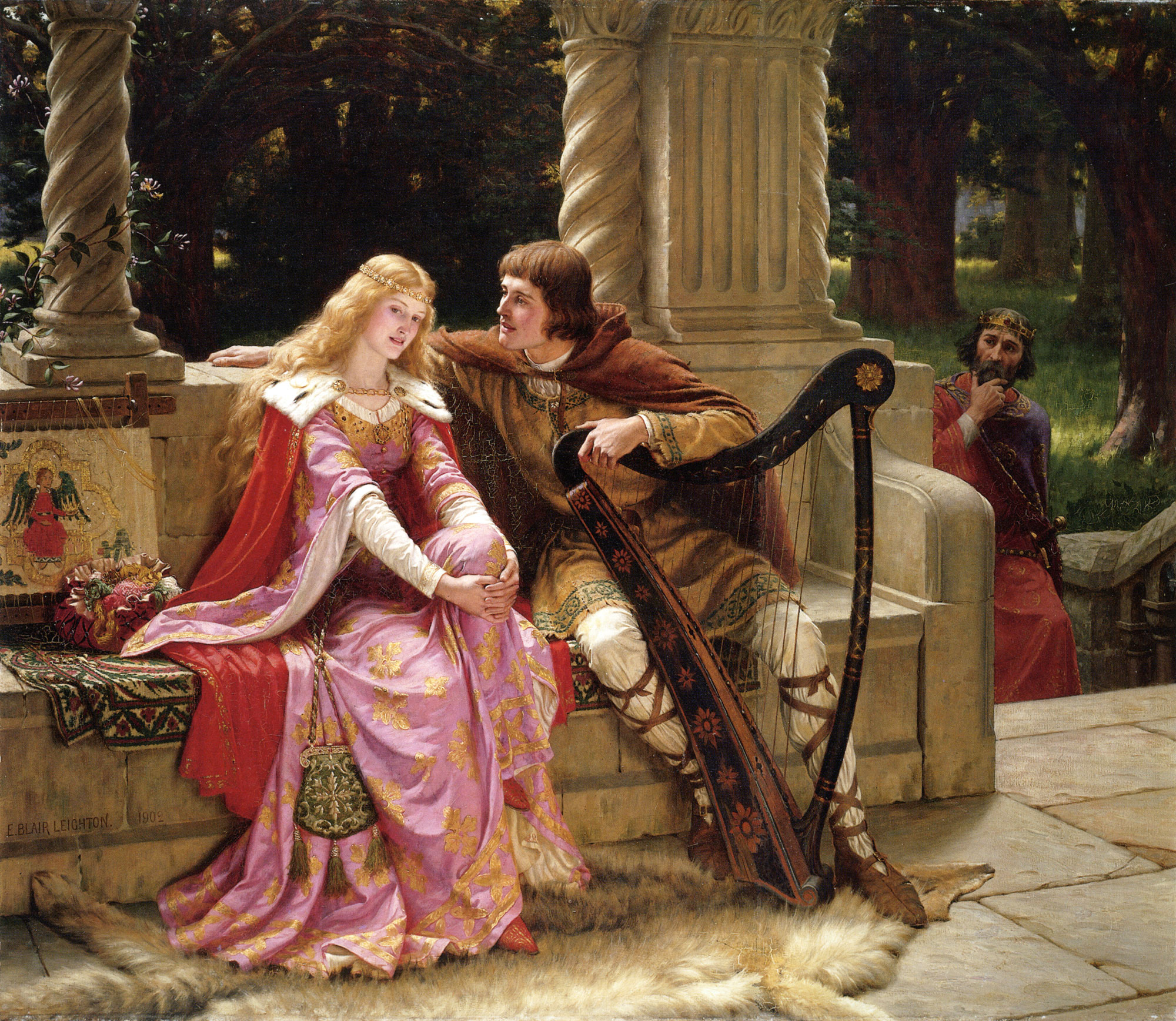
The End of the Song by Edmund Blair Leighton

Bolton Abbey by David Murray

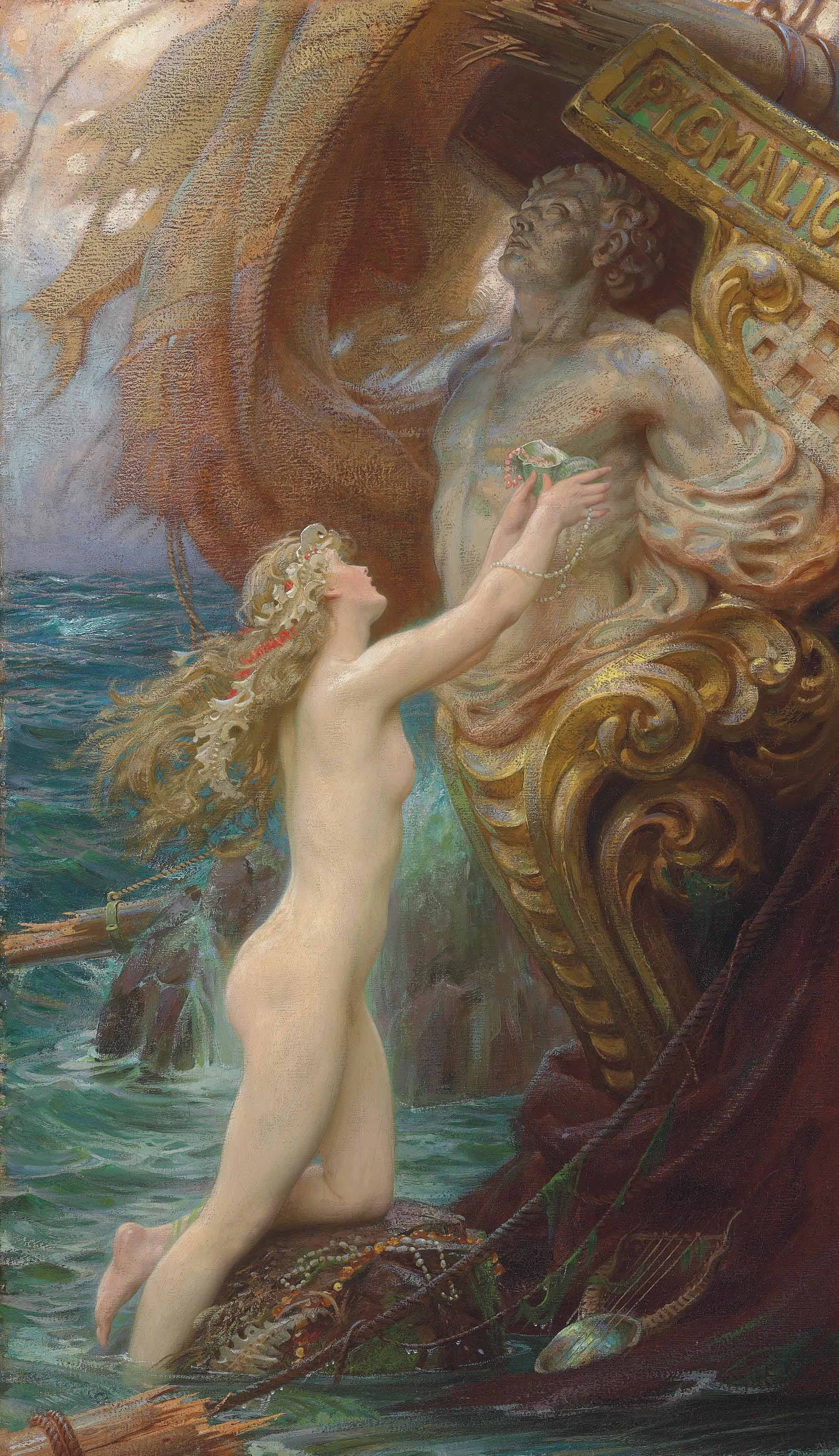
A Deep Sea Idyll by Herbert James Draper

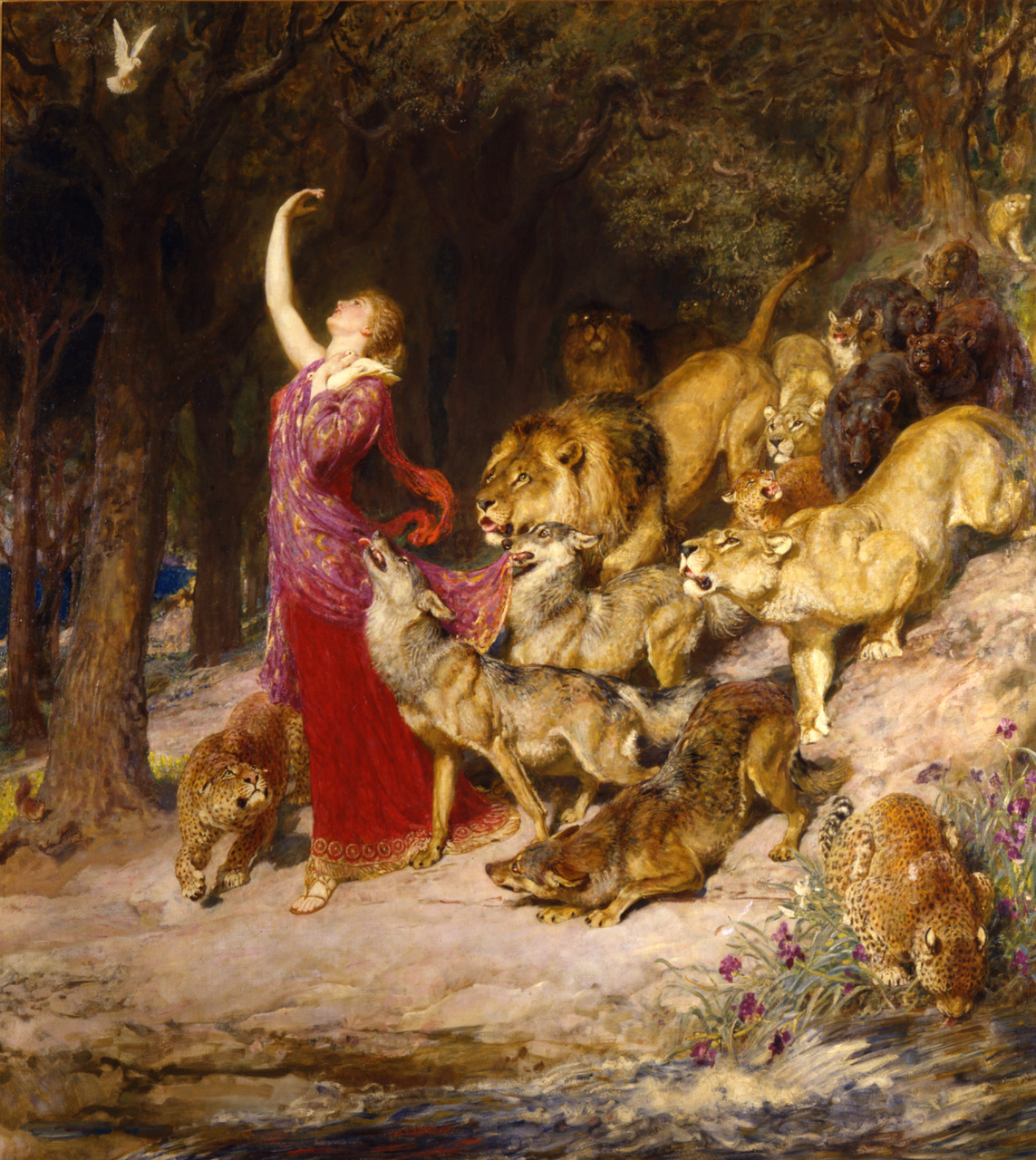
Aphrodite by Briton Rivière

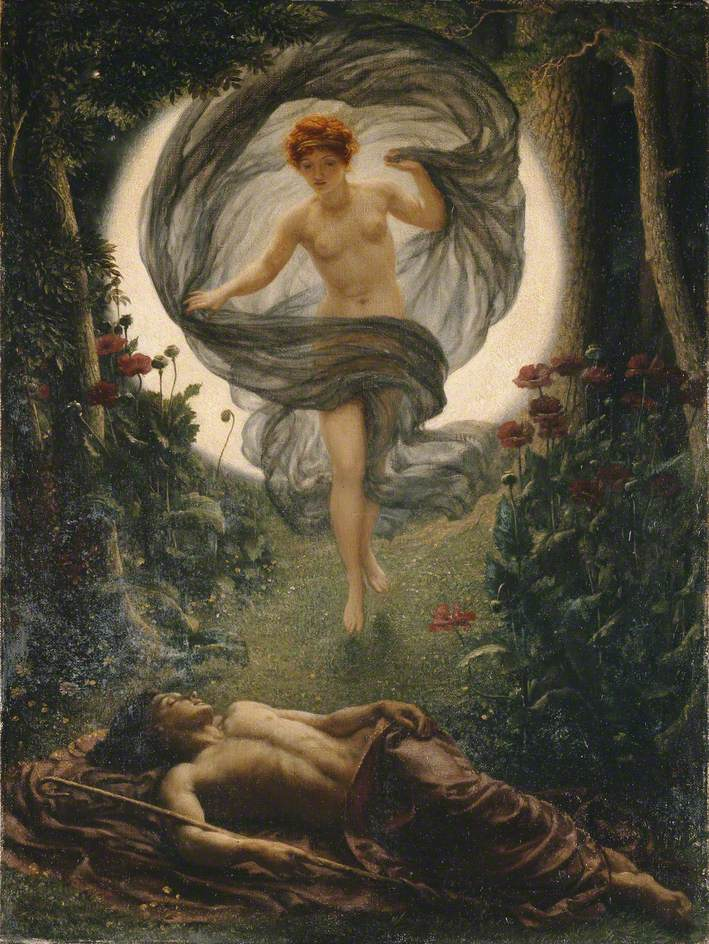
The Vision of Endymion by Edward Poynter

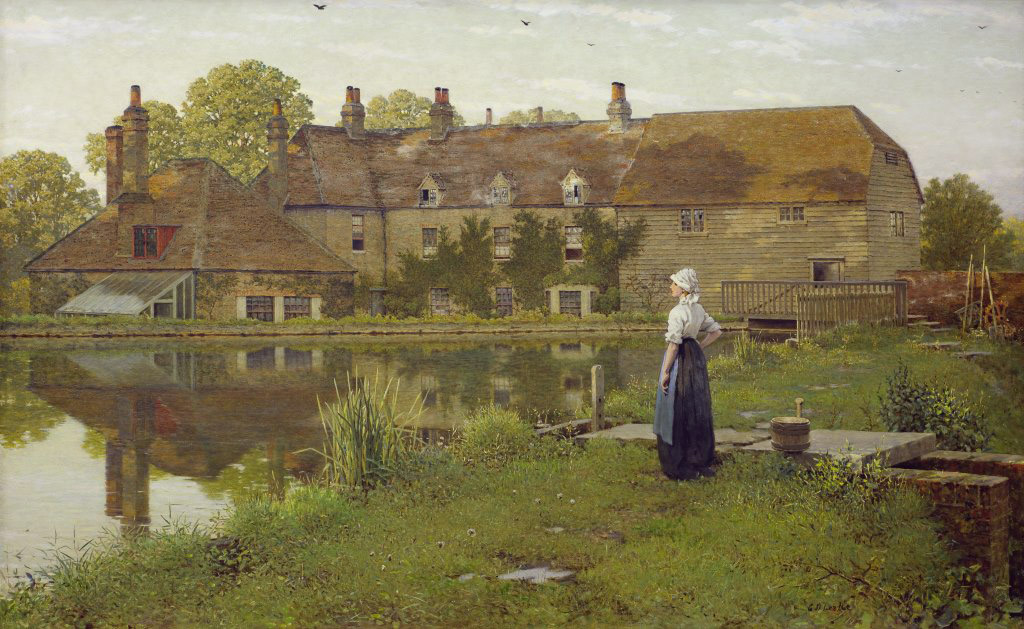
The Last Ray by George Dunlop Leslie

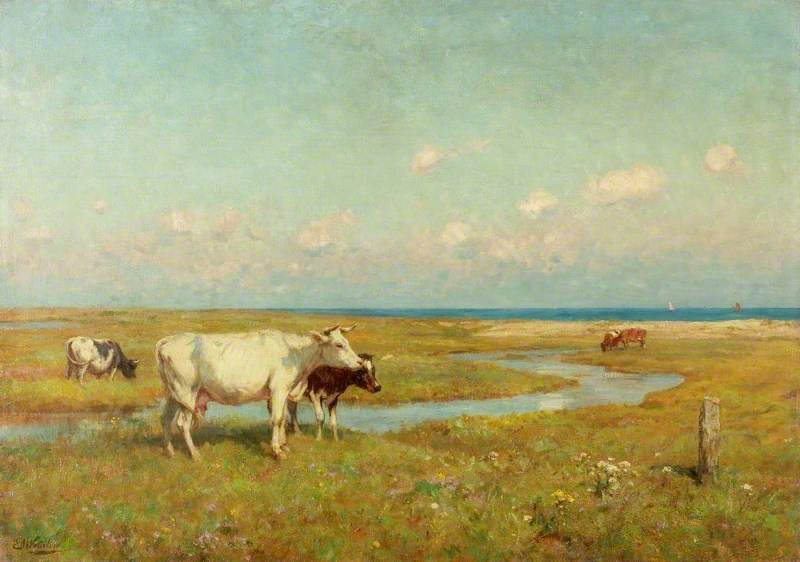
In Suffolk Marshes by Ernest Albert Waterlow

Washington's Farewell to the Army by Andrew Carrick Gow

Absence Makes the Heart Grow Fonder by Marcus Stone

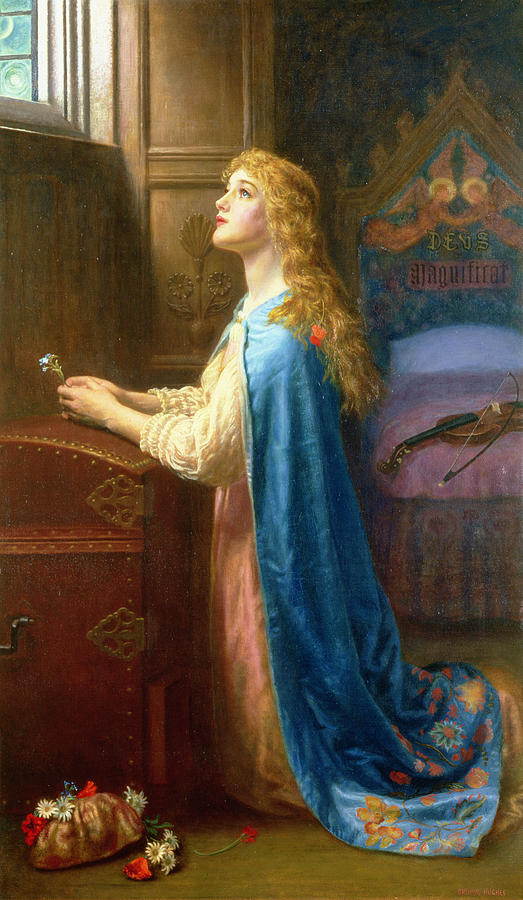
Forget Me Not by Arthur Hughes

Homewards by George Clausen

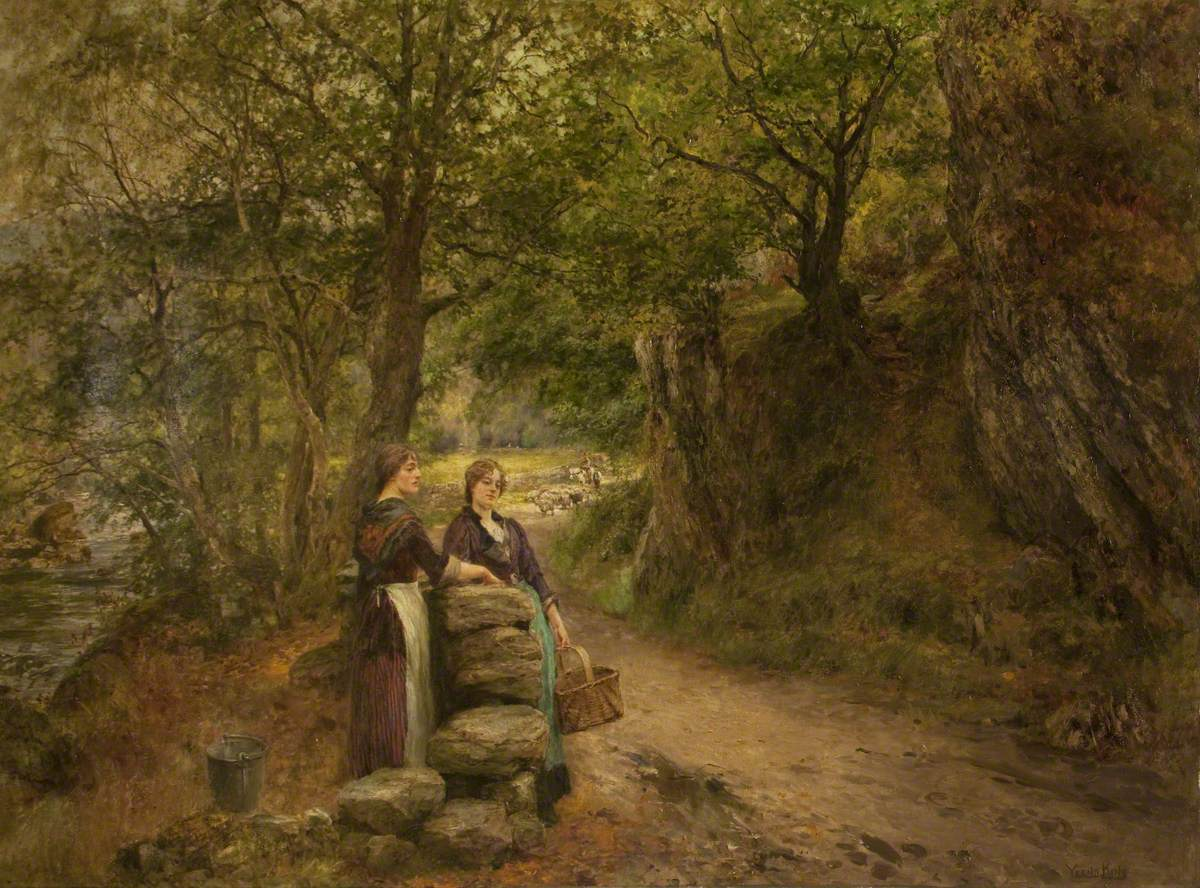
Market Morning by Yeend King

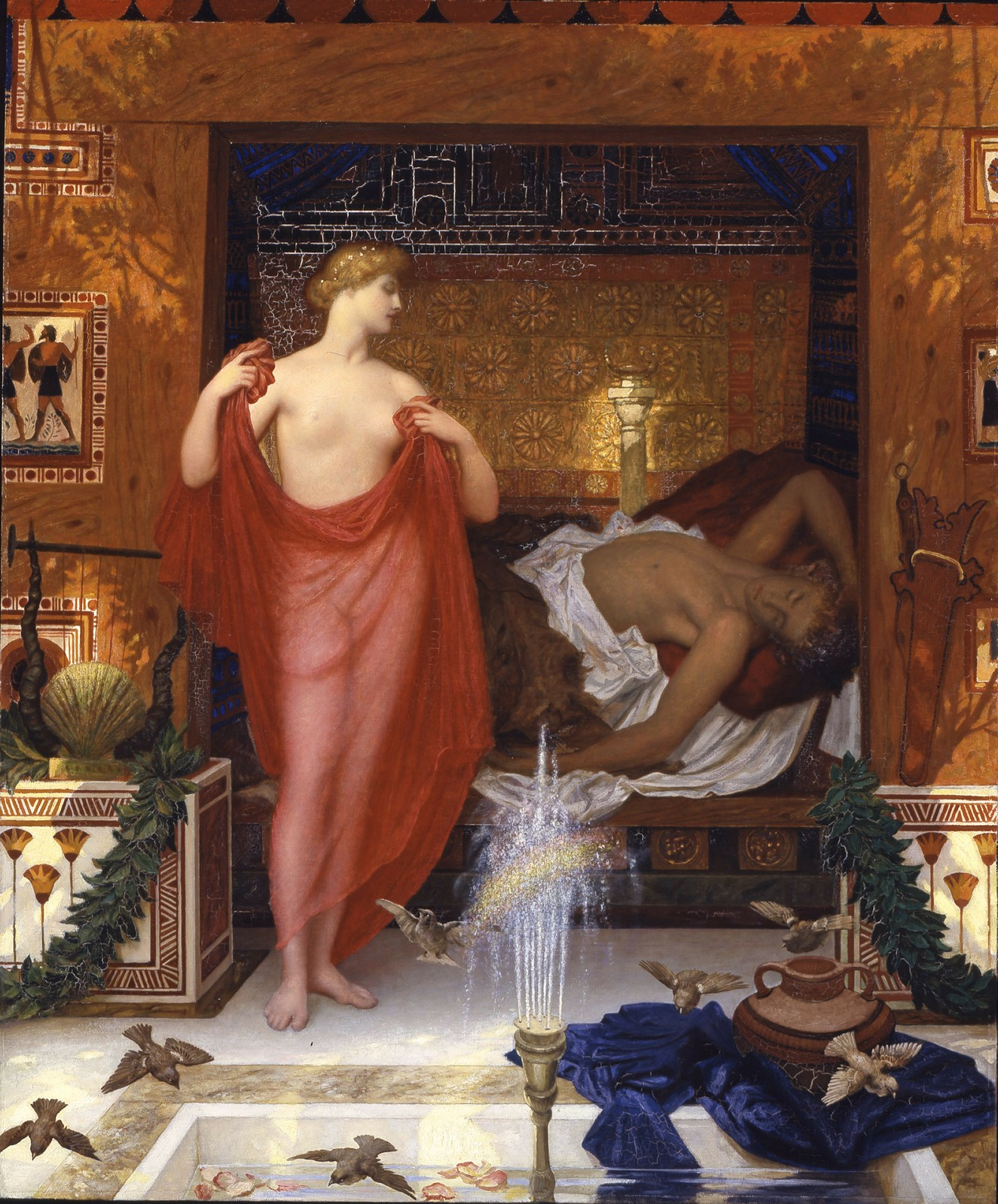
Hera in the House of Hephaistos by William Blake Richmond

Salmon Fishing on the Dee by Joseph Farquharson

Through the Crisp Air by Joseph Farquharson

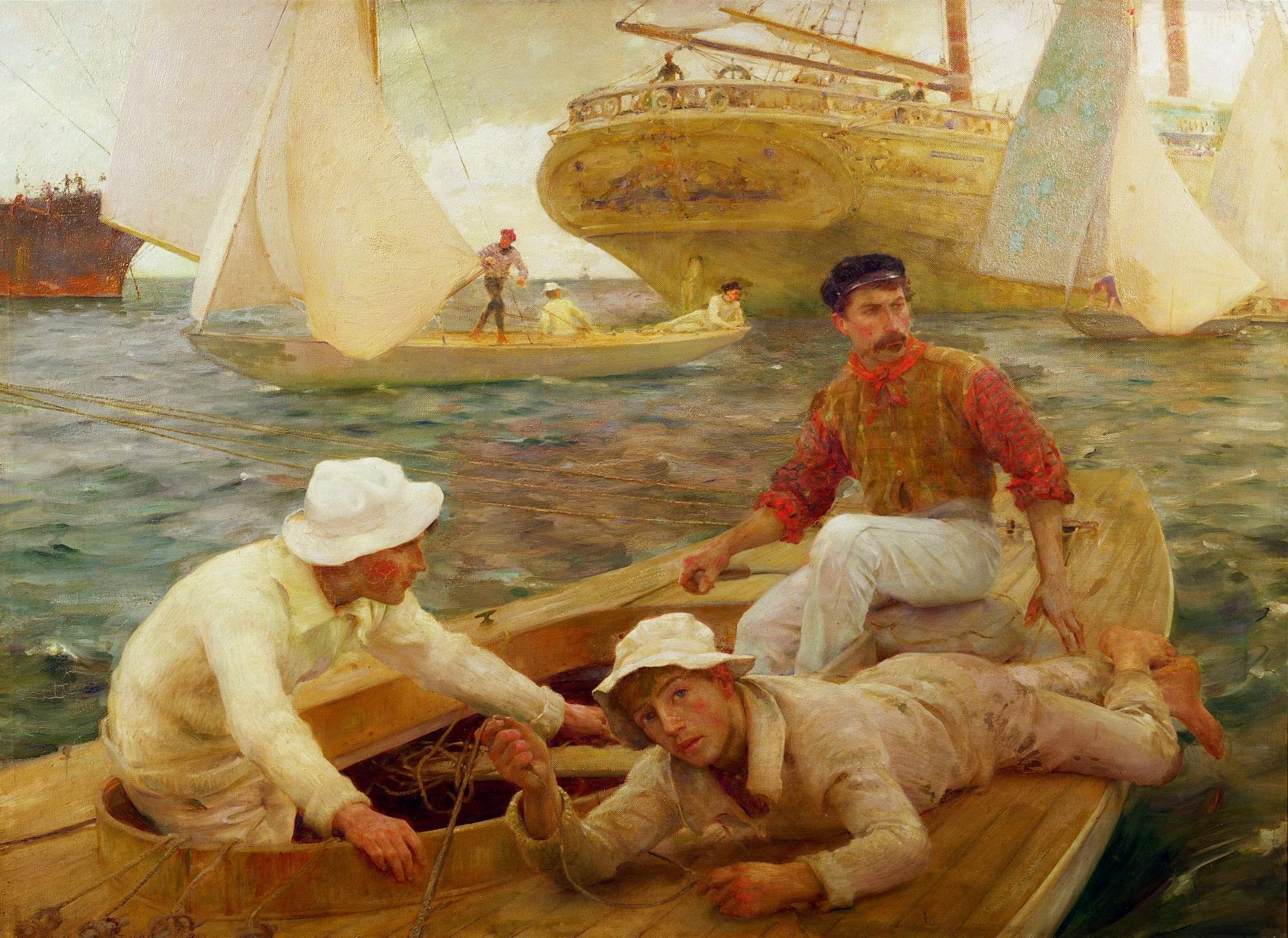
The Run Home by Henry Scott Tuke

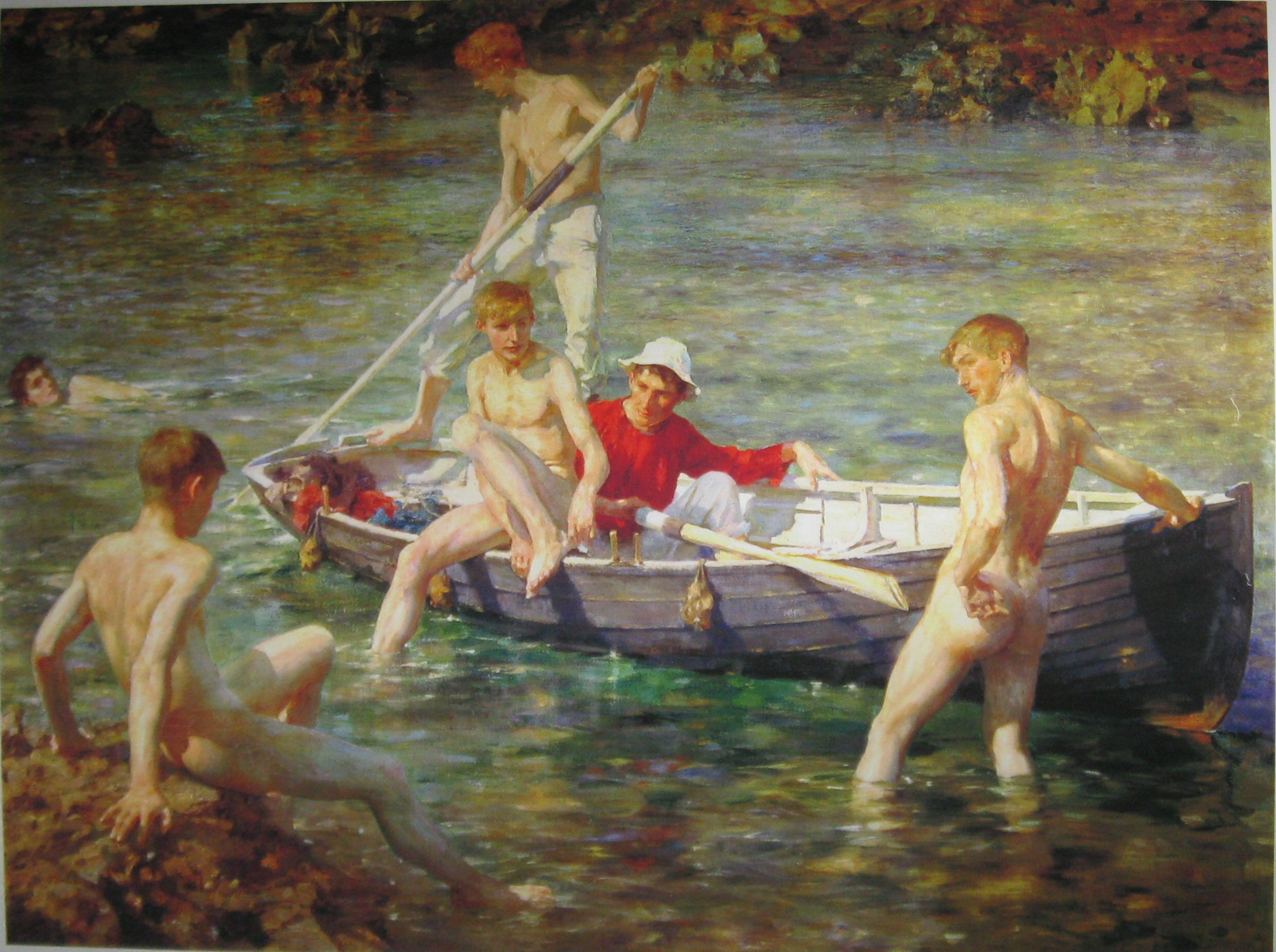
Ruby, Gold and Malachite by Henry Scott Tuke

An idyll of Como by Alfred East

The Valley of the Lambourne by Alfred East

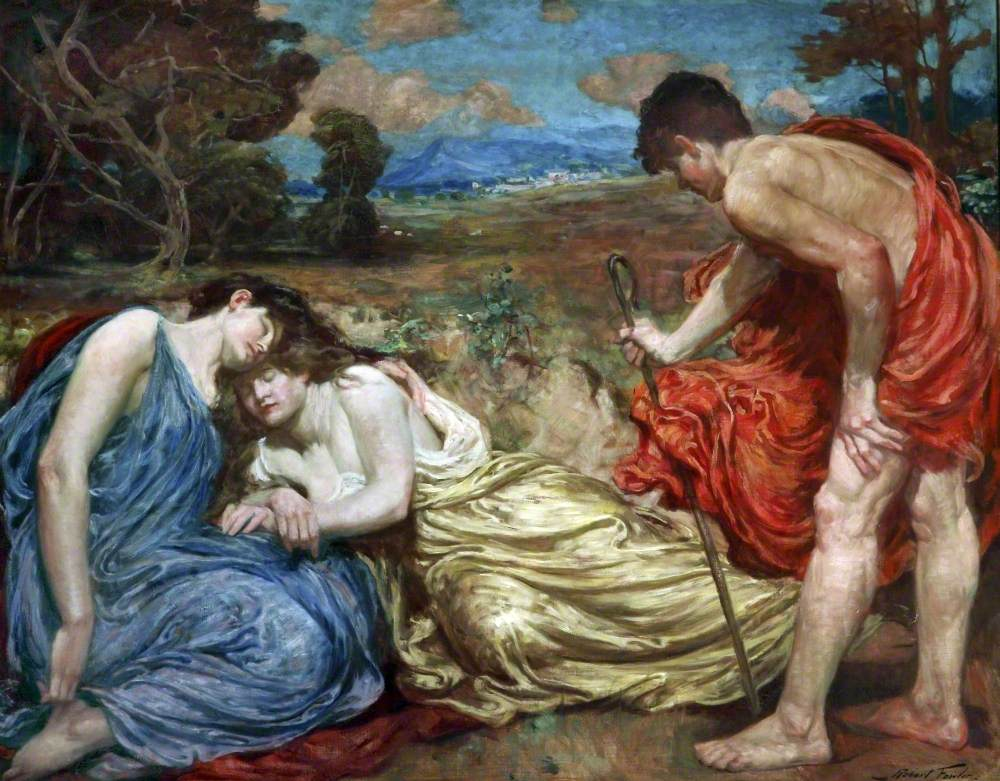
Sleeping Nymphs Discovered by a Shepherd by Robert Fowler

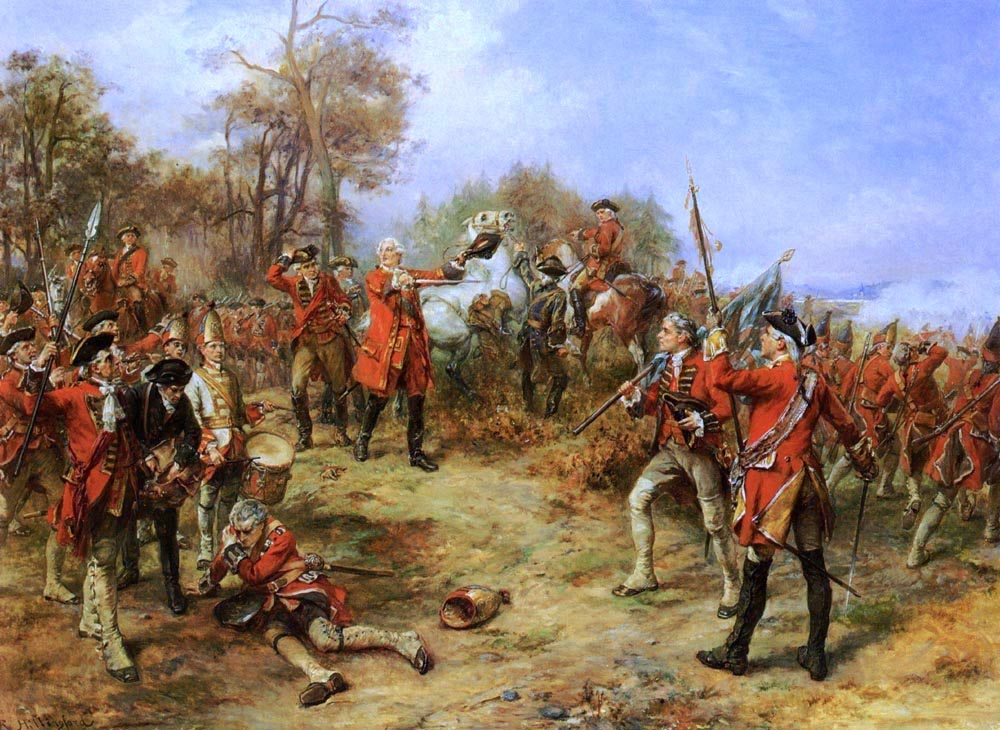
George II at the Battle of Dettingen by Robert Alexander Hillingford

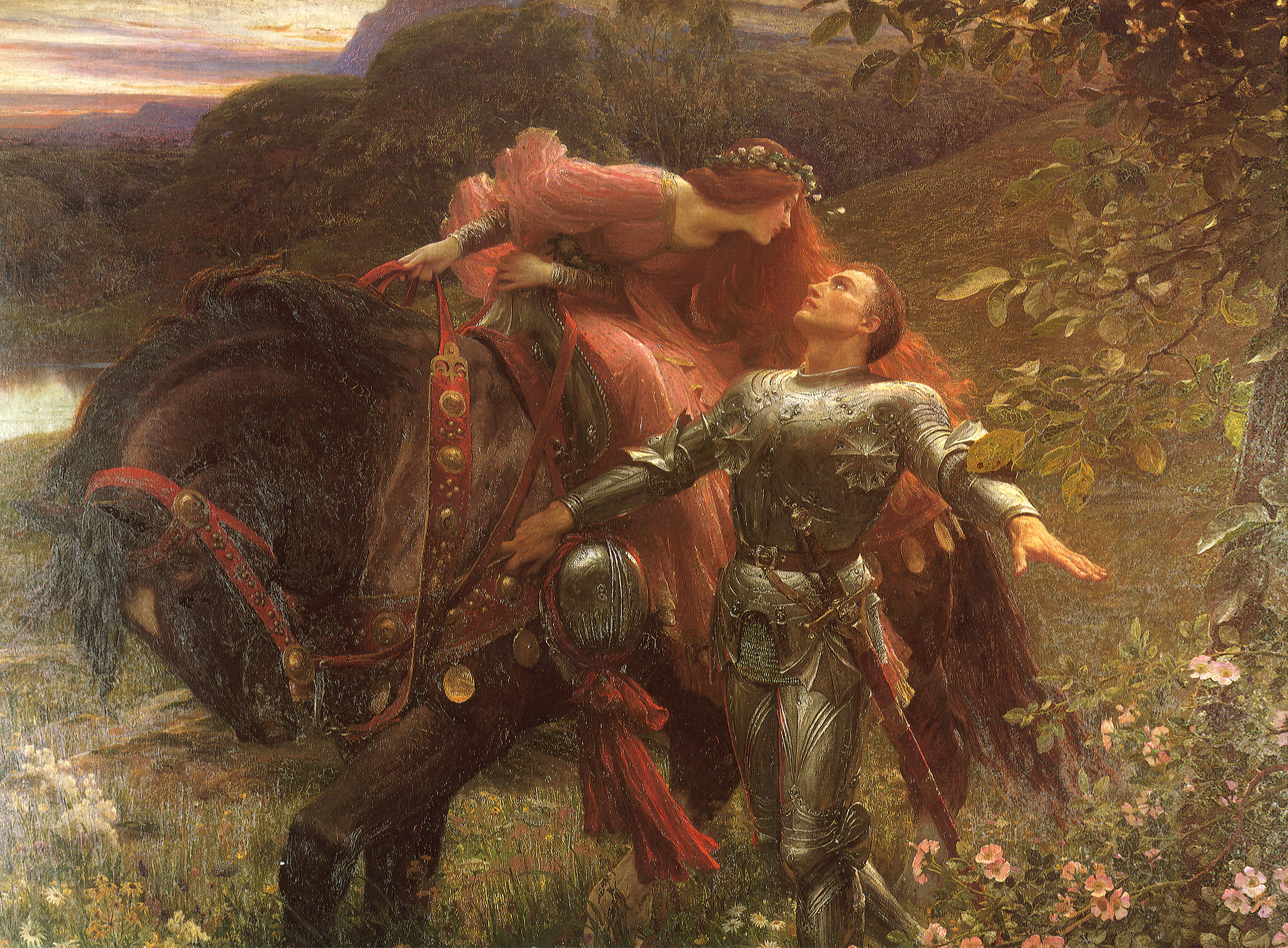
La Belle Dame sans Merci by Frank Dicksee

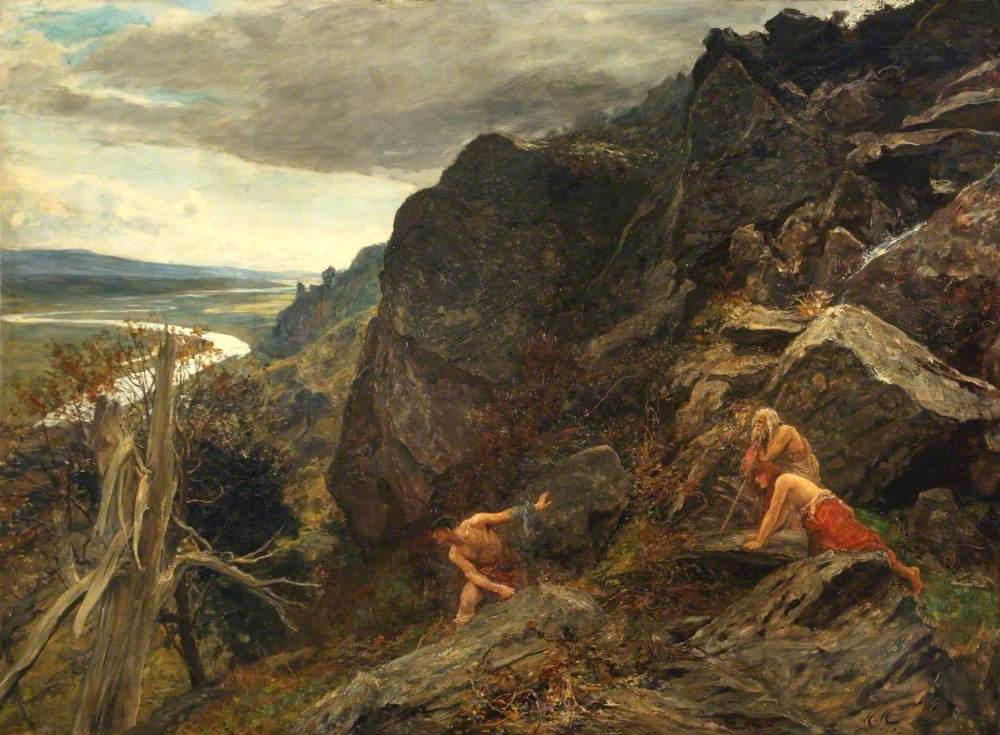
Watching the Invaders by Hubert von Herkomer

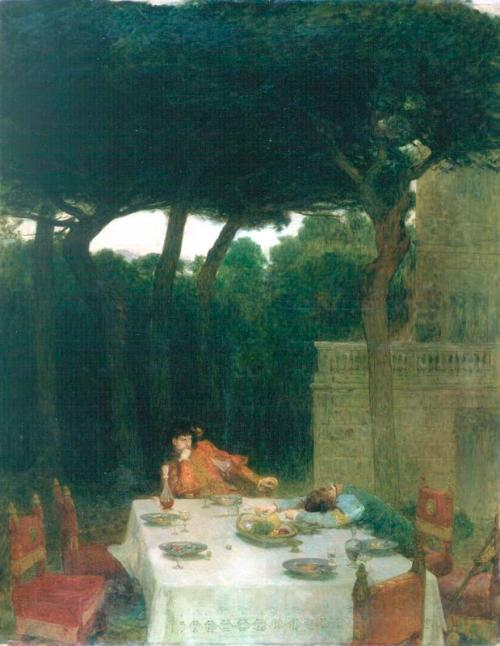
The Borgia by William Quiller Orchardson

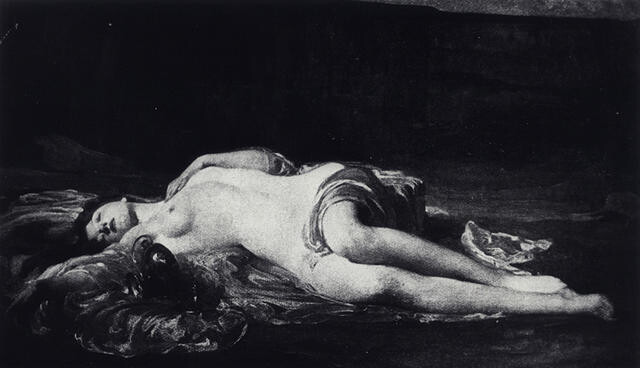
Psyche by Solomon Joseph Solomon

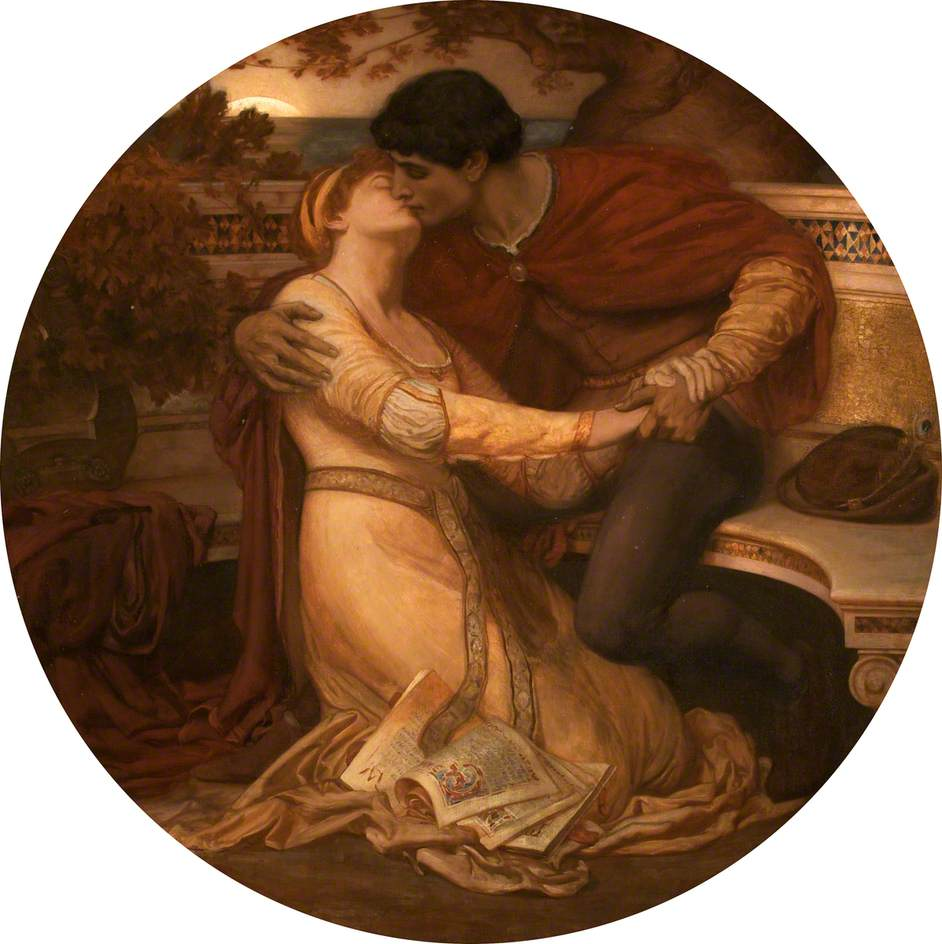
Paolo and Francesca by Christopher Williams

=== Portraits ===
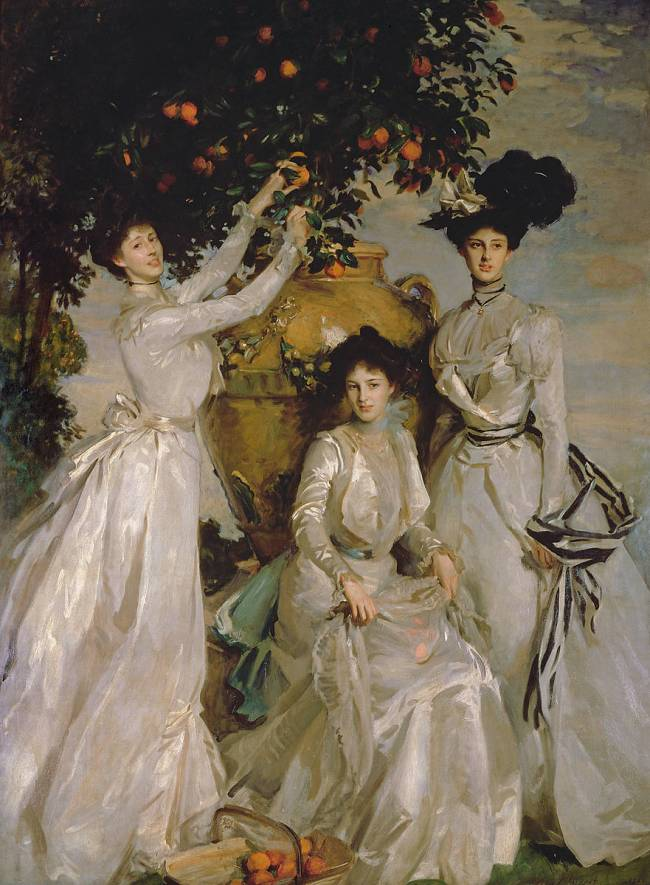
The Acheson Sisters by John Singer Sargent

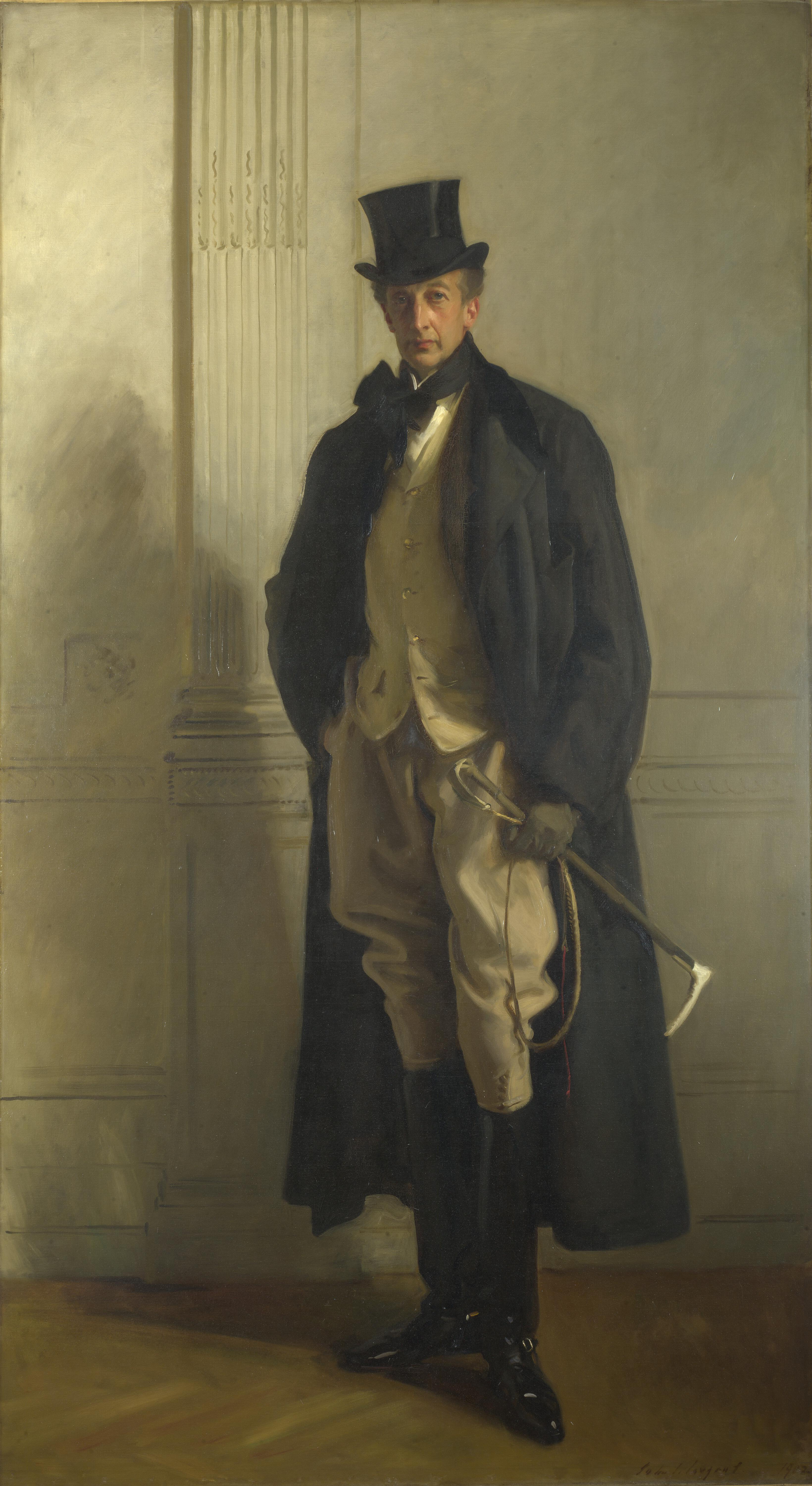
Portrait of Lord Ribblesdale by John Singer Sargent

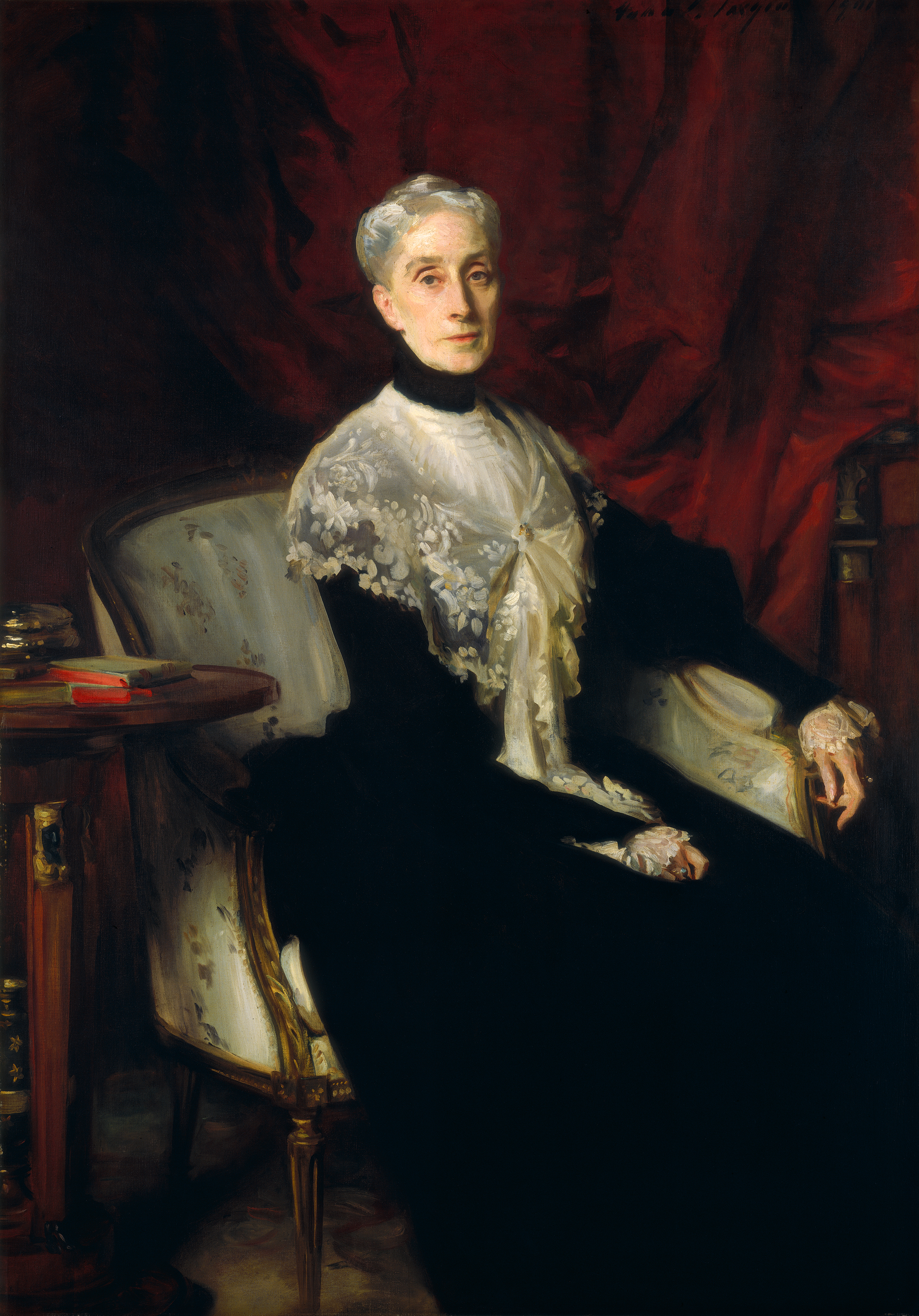
Portrait of Ellen Peabody Endicott by John Singer Sargent

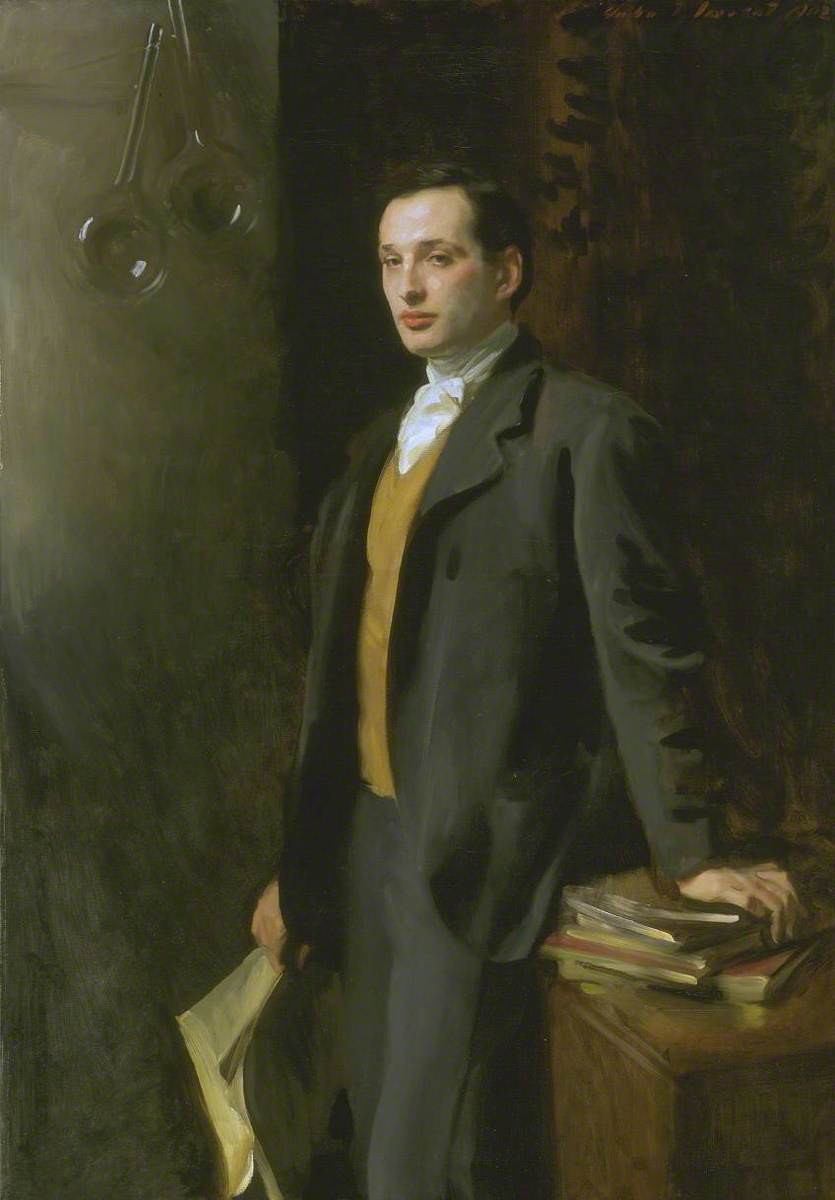
Portrait of Alfred Wertheimer by John Singer Sargent

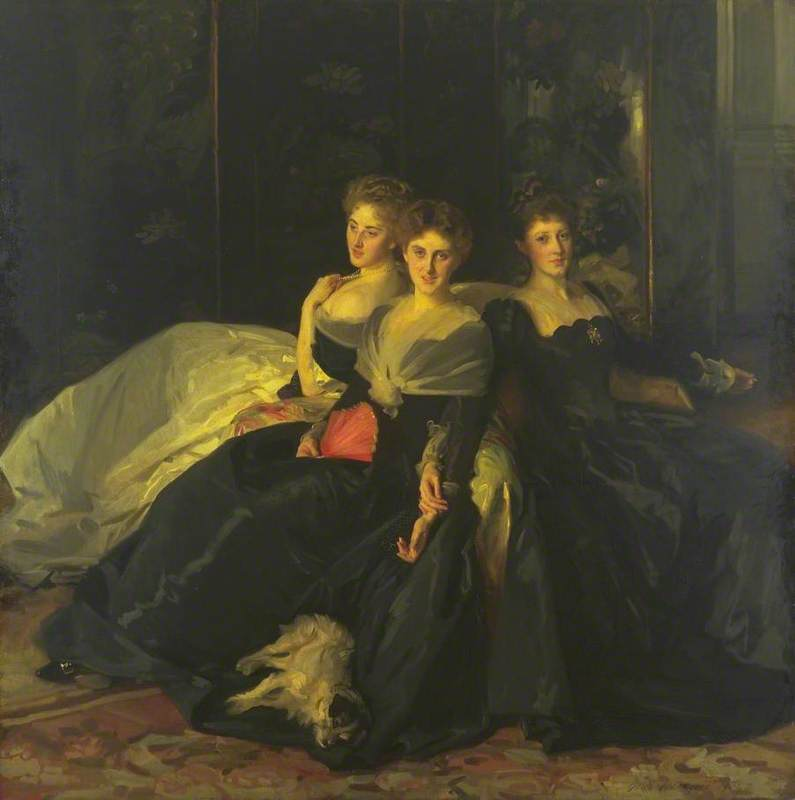
The Misses Hunter by John Singer Sargent

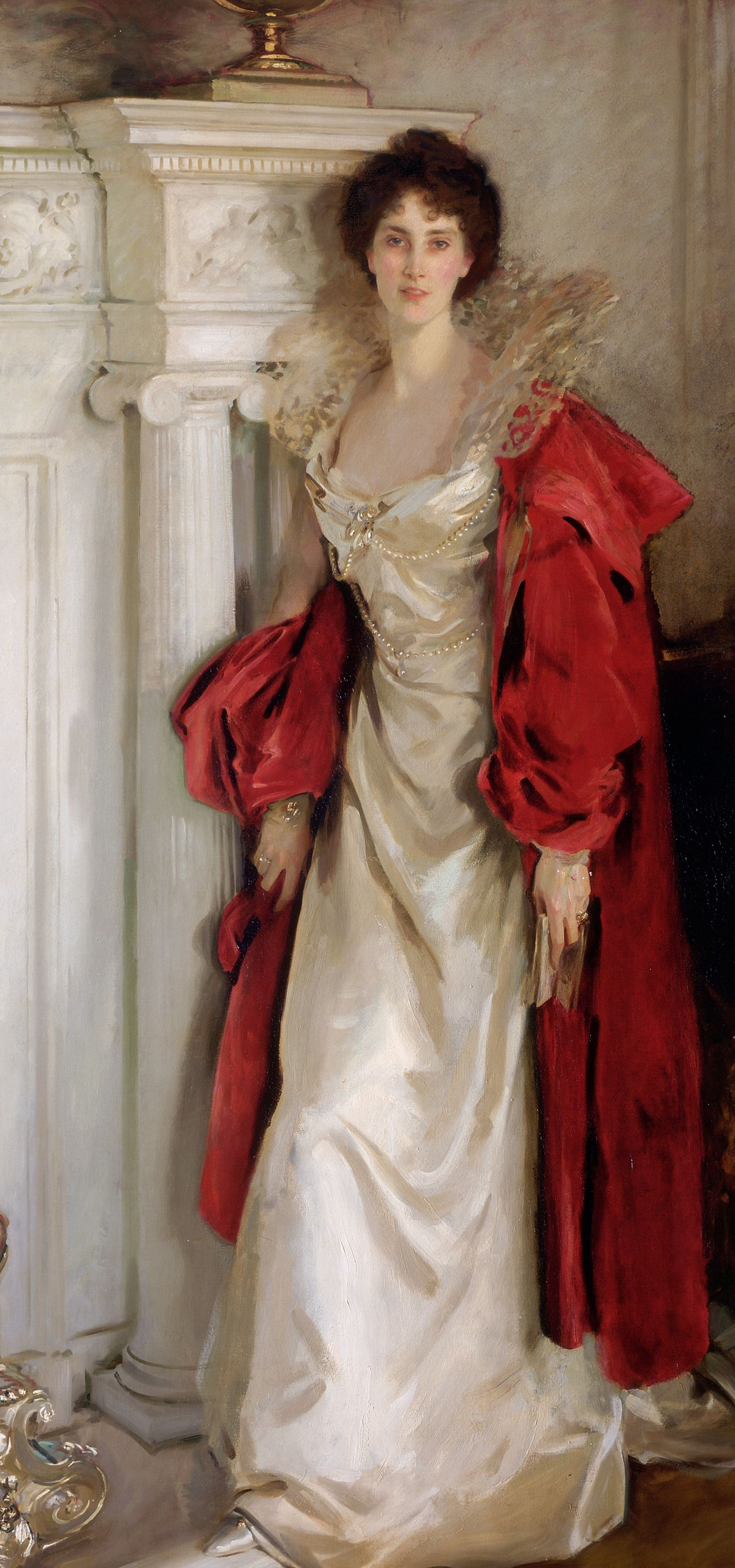
Portrait of the Duchess of Portland by John Singer Sargent

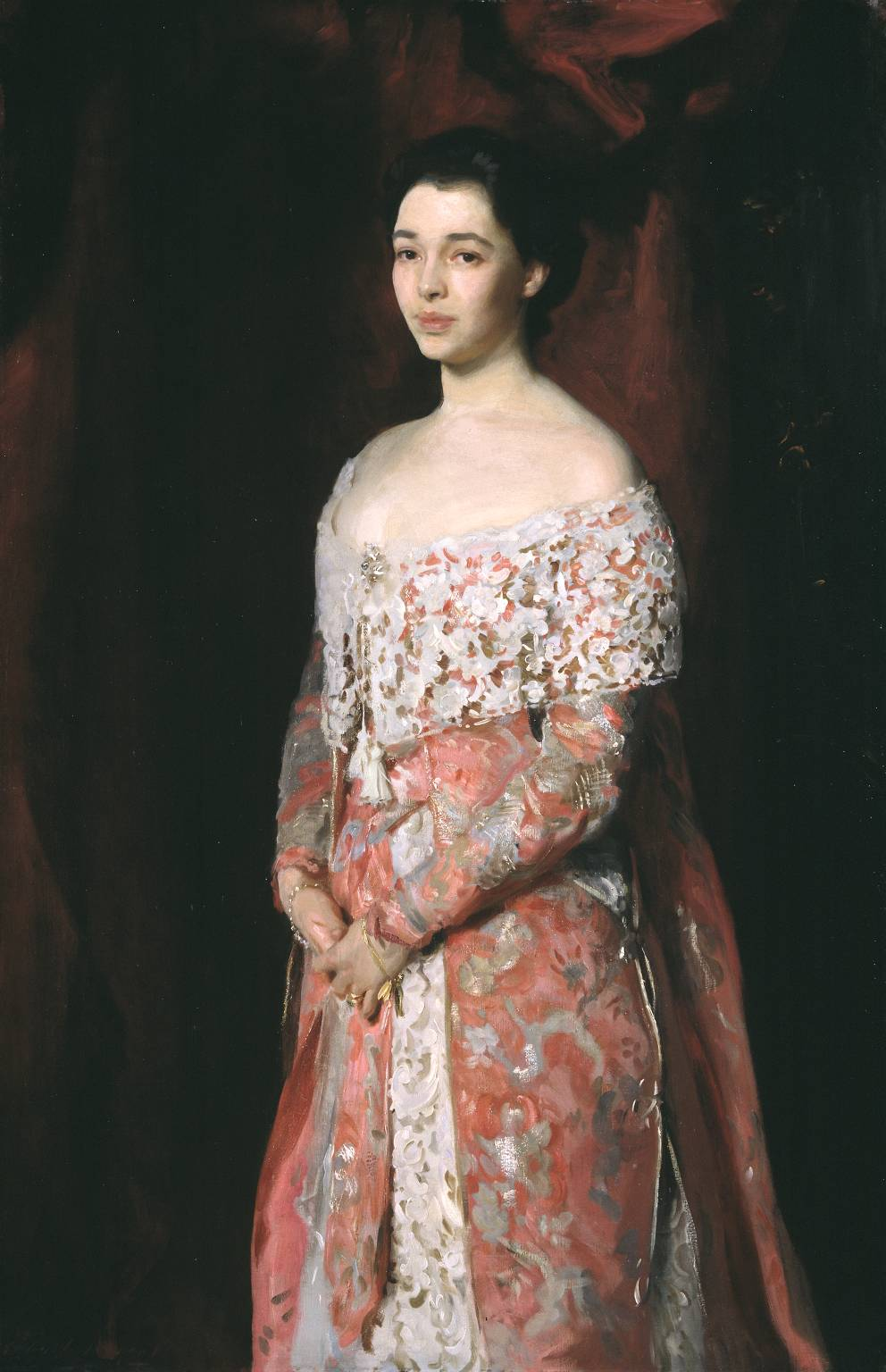
Portrait of Matilda Hirsch by John Singer Sargent

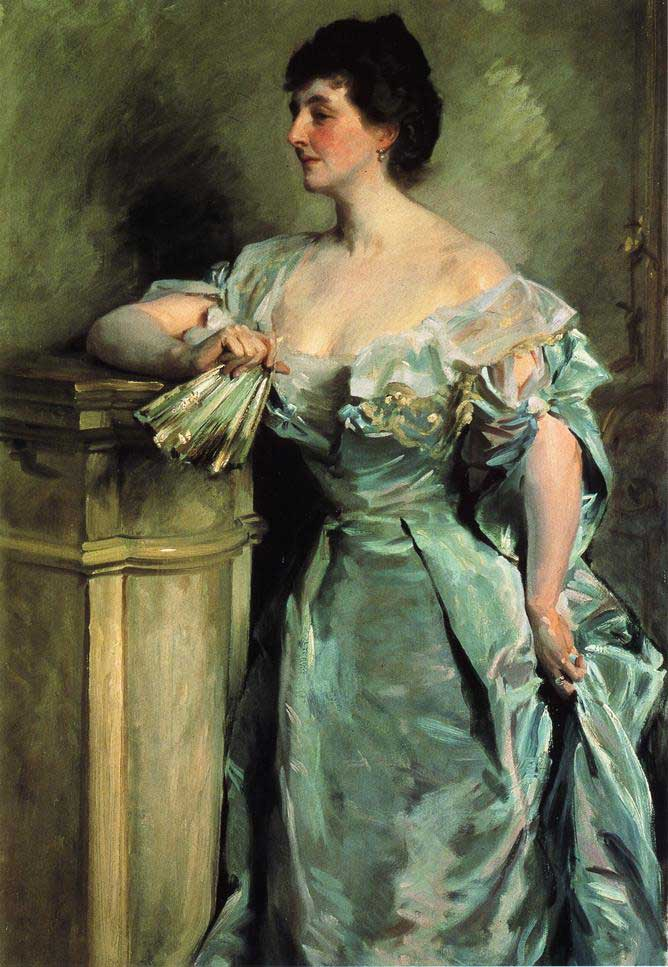
Portrait of Lady Lady Meysey-Thompson by John Singer Sargent

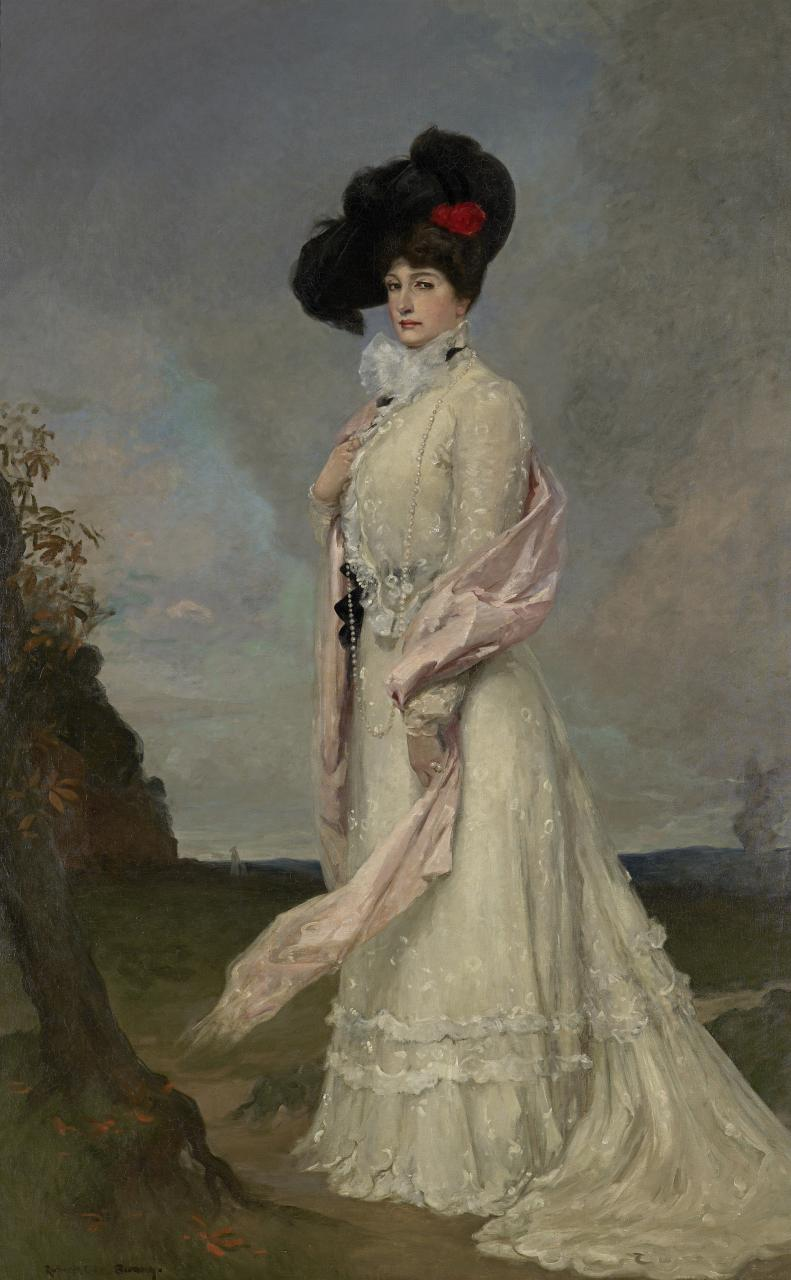
Portrait of Nellie Melba by Rupert Bunny

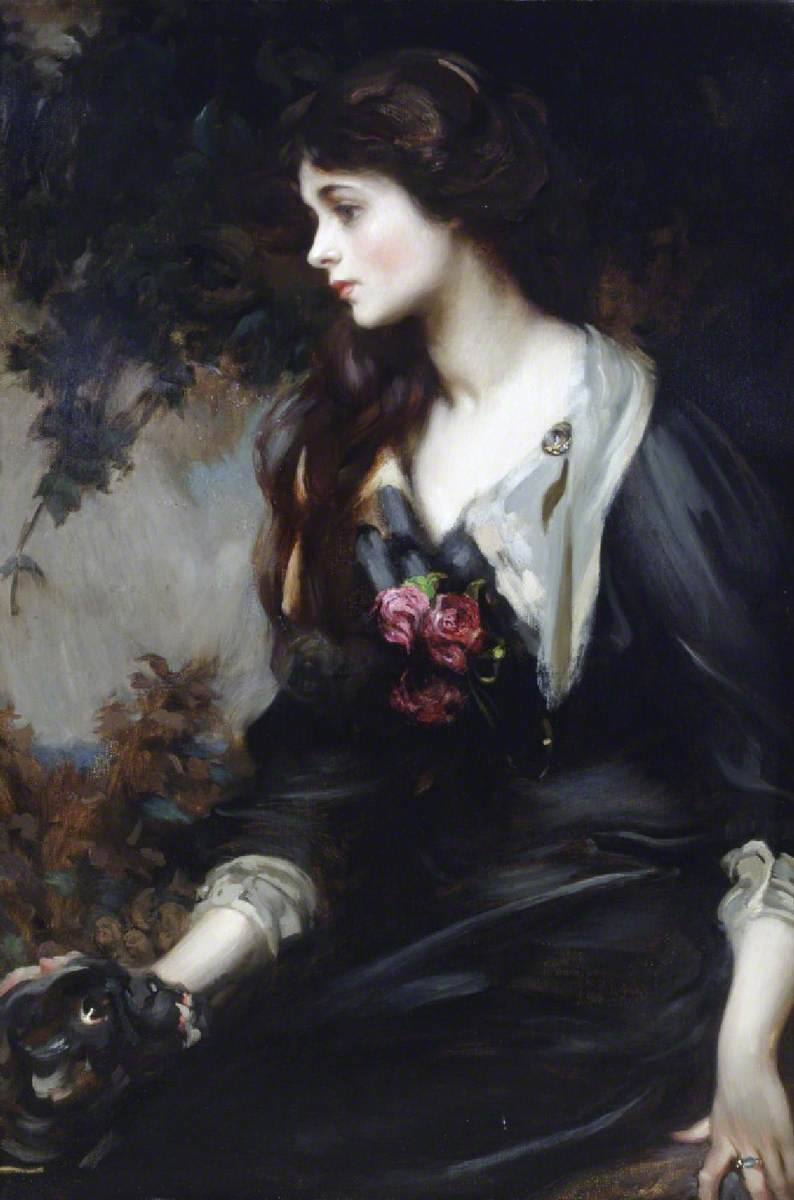
Portrait of Lady Marjorie Manners by James Jebusa Shannon

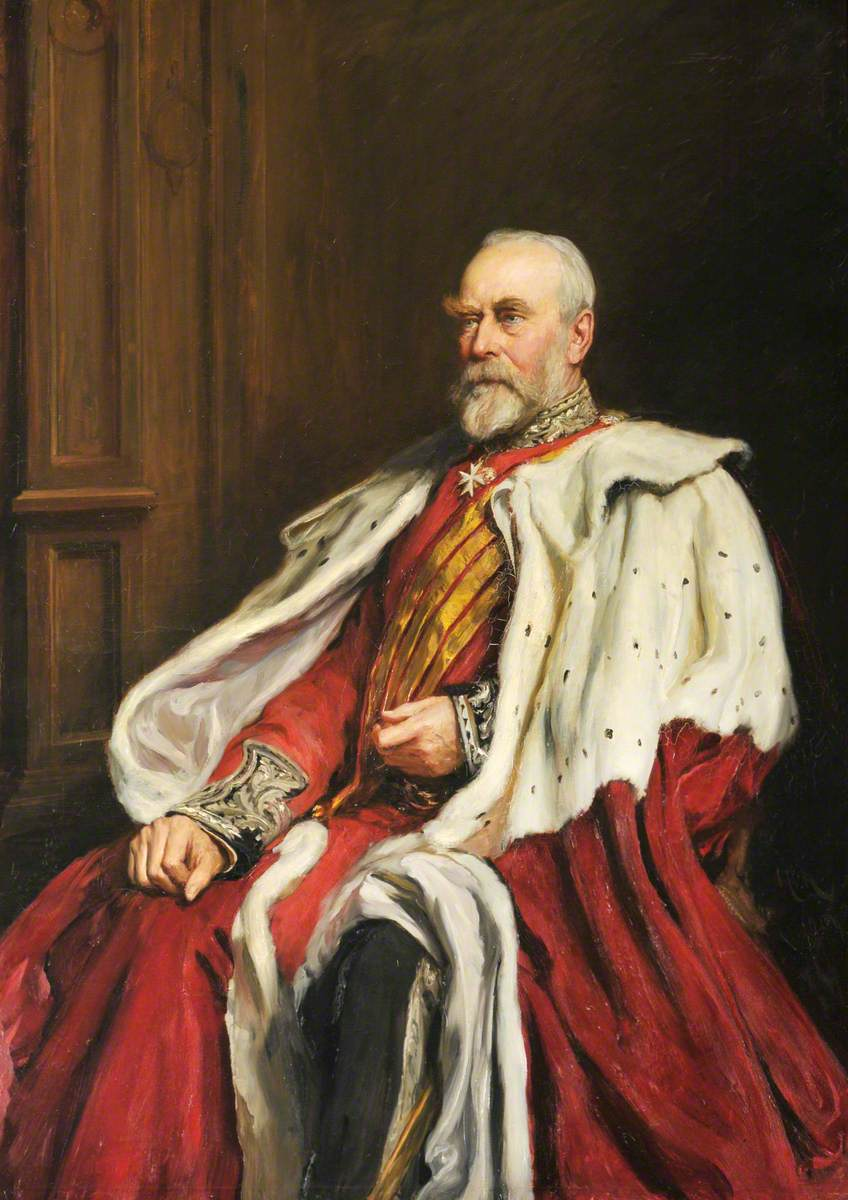
Portrait of Lord Egerton by Hubert von Herkomer

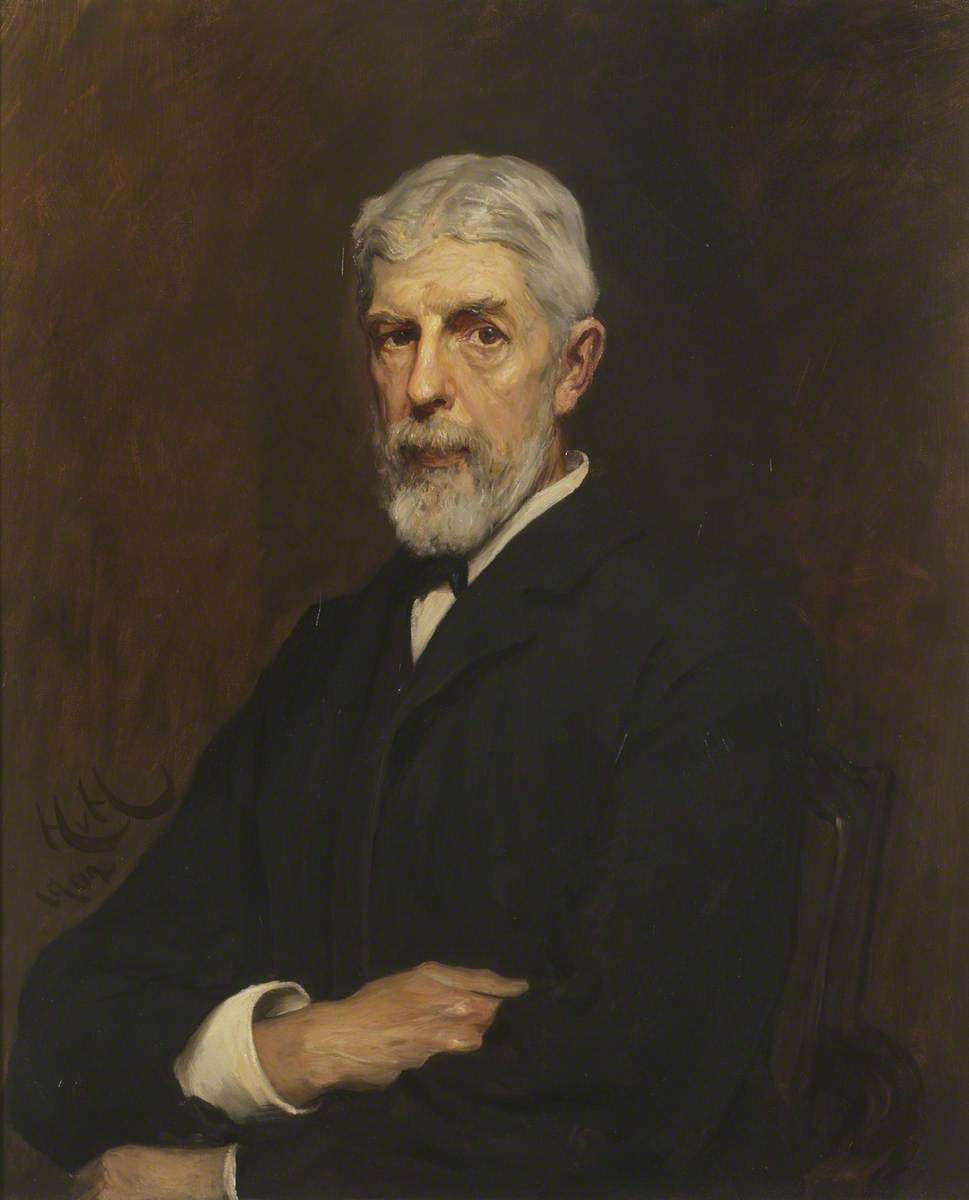
Portrait of Henry Trueman Wood by Hubert von Herkomer

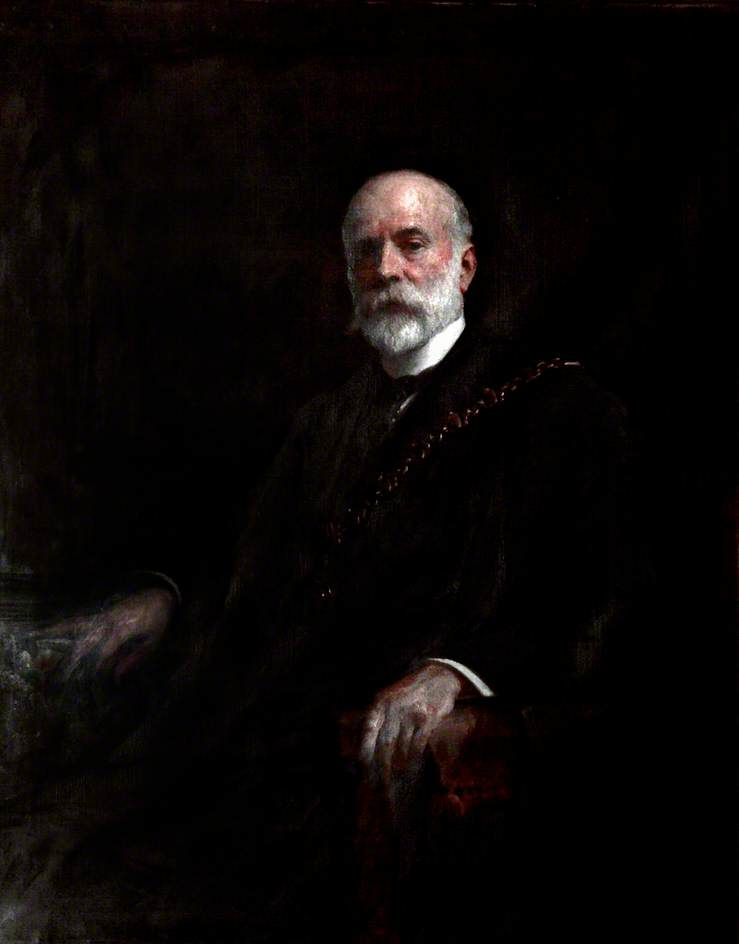
Portrait of Richard Pilkington by Arthur Stockdale Cope

Portrait of Joseph Cockfield Dimsdale by Arthur Stockdale Cope

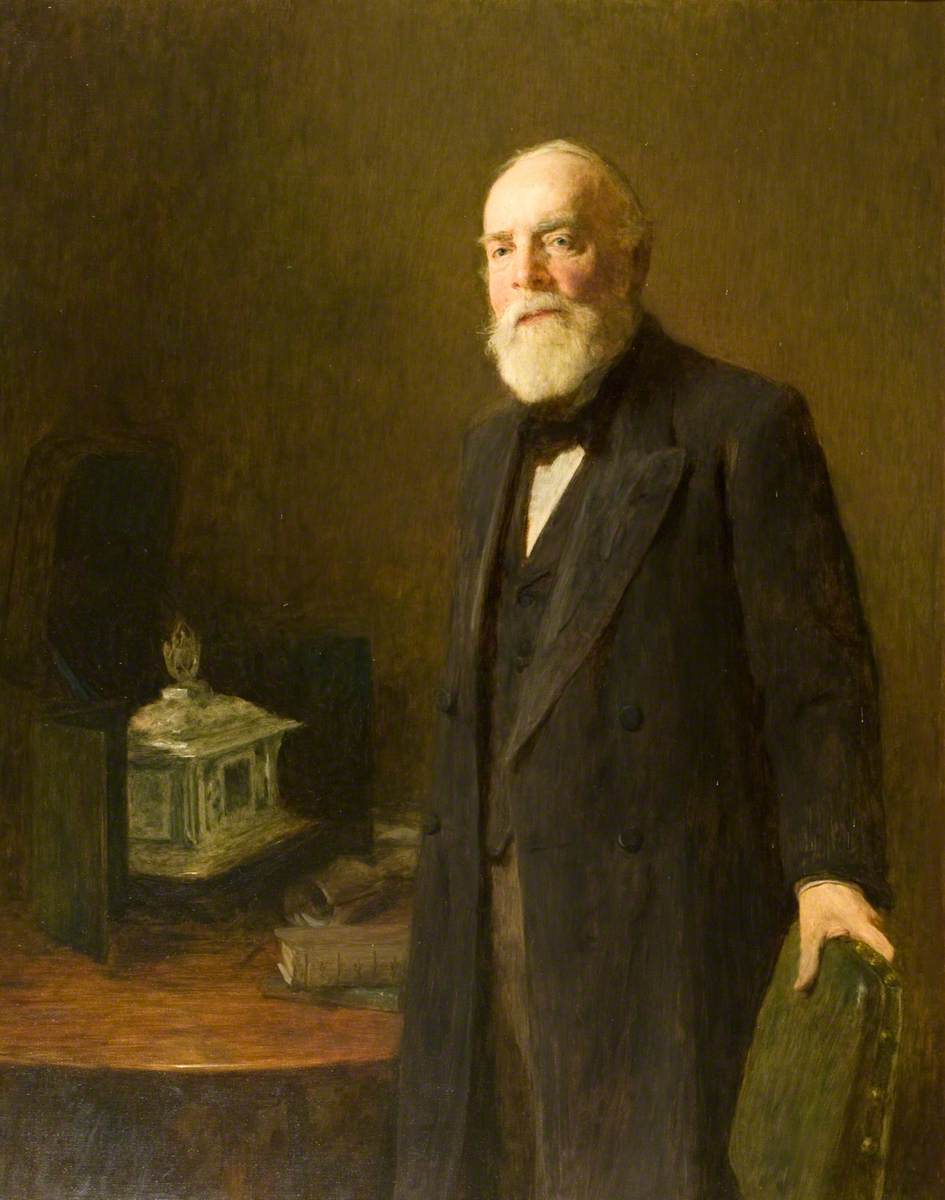
Portrait of John Leng by William Quiller Orchardson

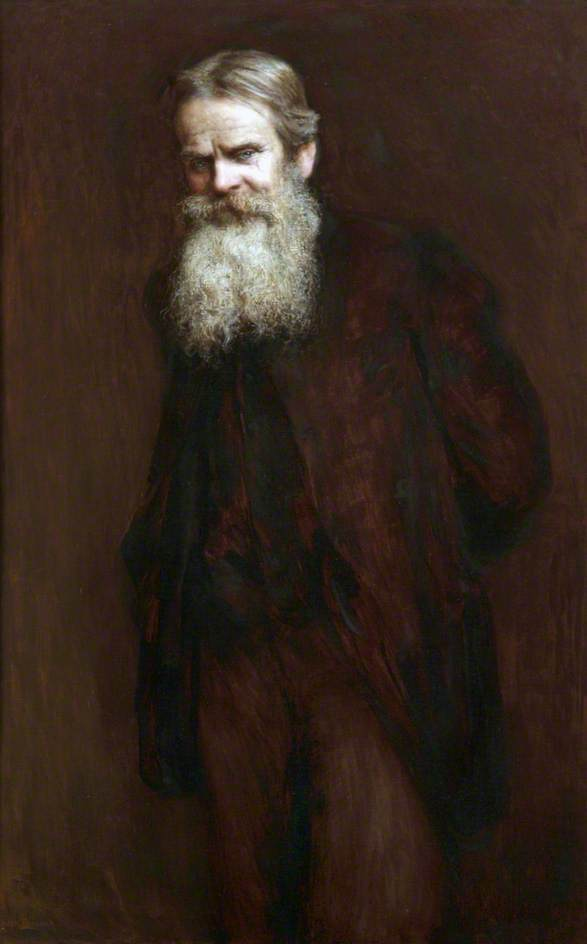
Portrait of William Holman Hunt by Ralph Peacock

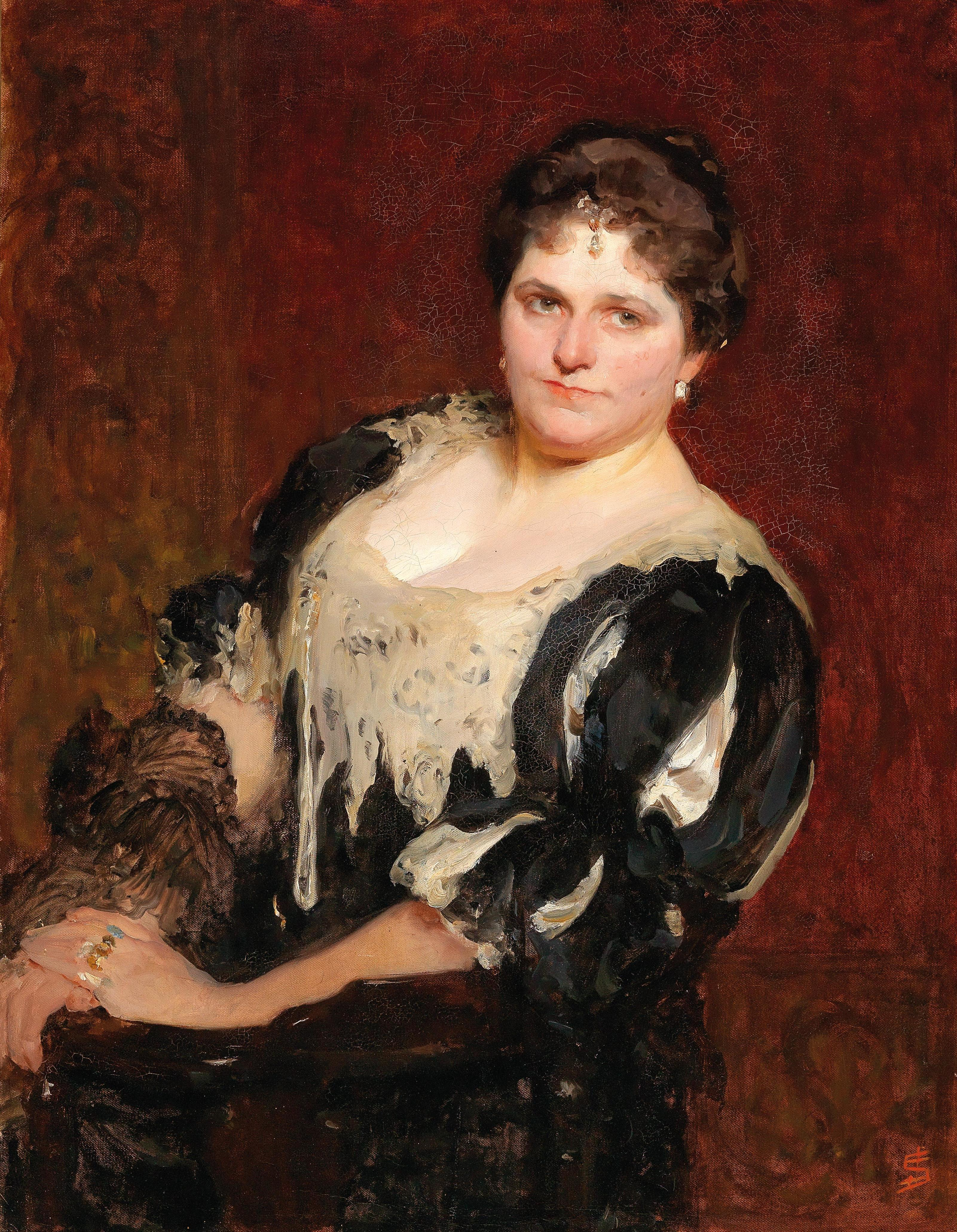
Portrait of Blanche Marchesi by Solomon Joseph Solomon

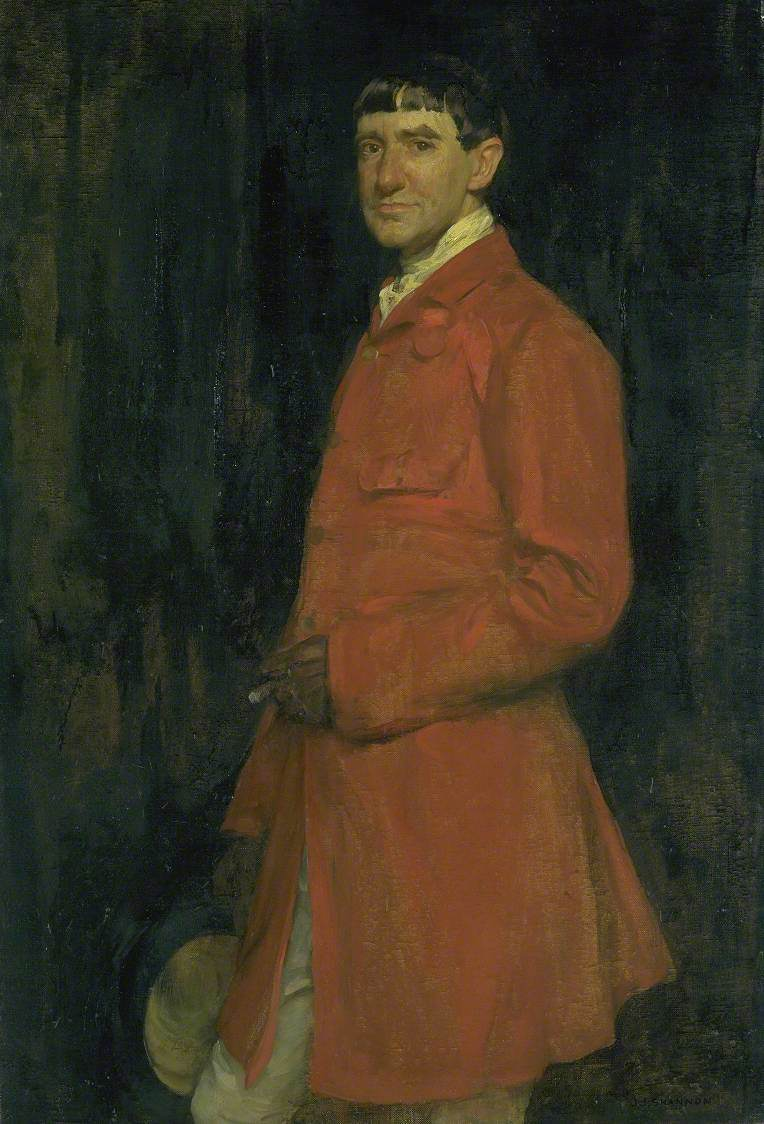
Portrait of Phil May by James Jebusa Shannon

Portrait of Francis Charrington by Henry Tanworth Wells

Portrait of Edwin Grove by Henry Tanworth Wells

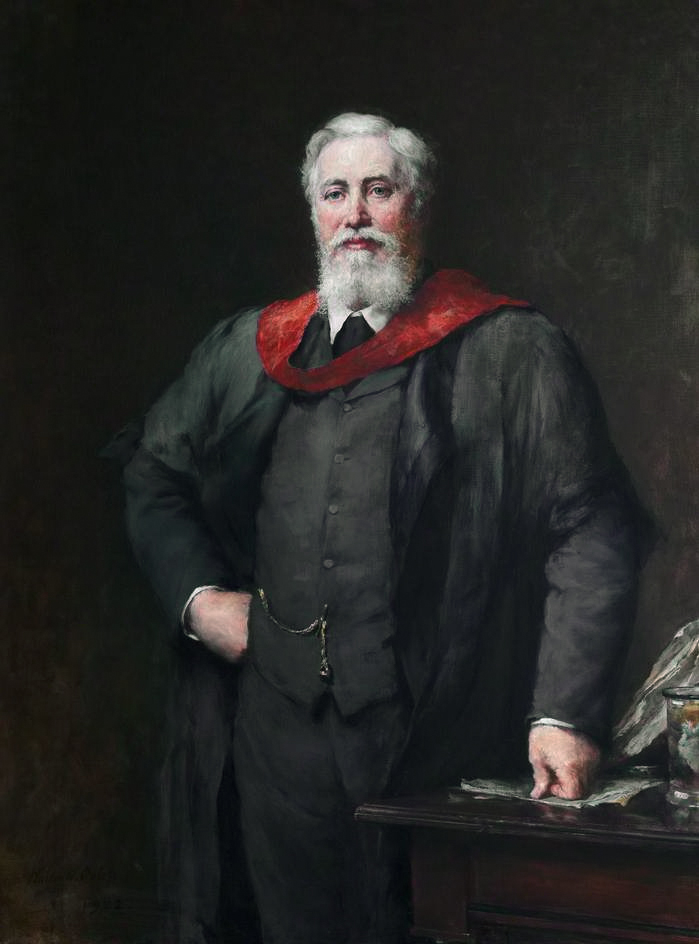
Portrait of James Bell Pettigrew by Walter William Ouless

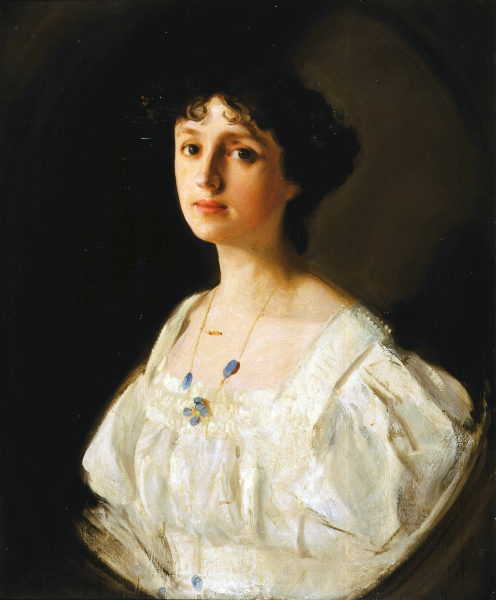
Portrait of Lilian Braithwaite by Charles Sims

Portrait of Mrs W. K. D'Arcy by Frank Dicksee

== Bibliography ==
- Lomax, James & Ormond, Richard. John Singer Sargent and the Edwardian Age. Leeds Art Galleries, 1979.
