= The Acheson Sisters =

Painting by John Singer Sargent

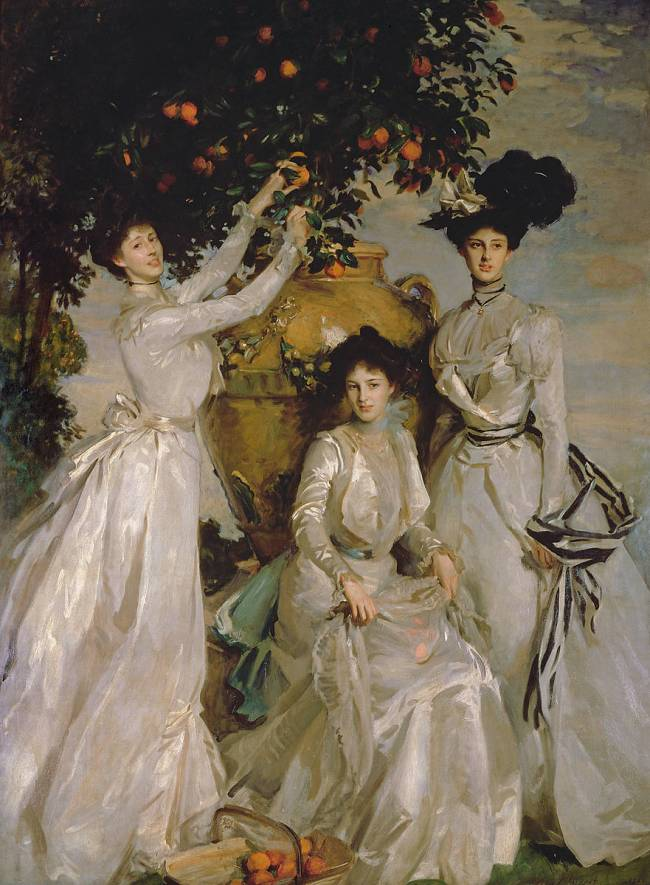
- Artist: John Singer Sargent
- Year: 1902
- Type: Oil on canvas, portrait
- Dimensions: 169.2 cm × 198.1 cm (66.6 in × 78.0 in)
- Location: Chatsworth House, Derbyshire

The Acheson Sisters is a 1902 portrait painting by the Anglo-American artist John Singer Sargent. It depicts the three Acheson sisters, granddaughters of Louisa Cavendish, Duchess of Devonshire from her first marriage. The composition draws partly on the 1773 painting Three Ladies Adorning a Term of Hymen by Joshua Reynolds.

It was one of eight paintings he displayed at the Royal Academy Exhibition of 1902 at Burlington House in London, to widespread critical praise. Today the painting is in the collection of Chatsworth House in Derbyshire.

== See also ==
- List of works by John Singer Sargent

== Bibliography ==
- Cohen, Michael. Sisters: Relation and Rescue in Nineteenth-century British Novels and Paintings. Fairleigh Dickinson University Press, 1995.
- Fairbrother, Trevor J. John Singer Sargent: The Sensualist. Seattle Art Museum, 2000.
- Lomax, James & Ormond, Richard. John Singer Sargent and the Edwardian Age. Leeds Art Galleries, 1979.
