= Chadding in Mount's Bay =

Painting by Stanhope Forbes

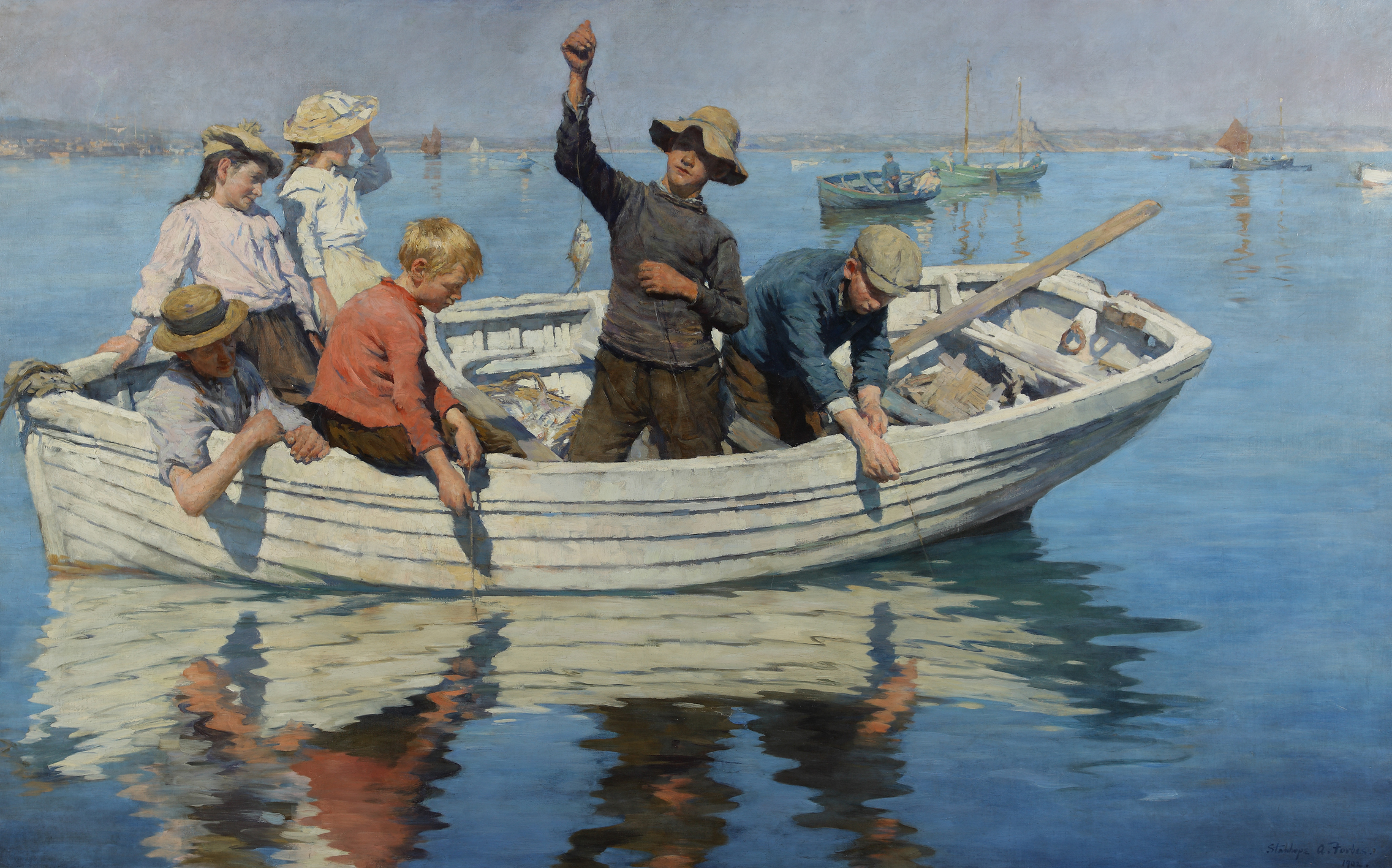
- Artist: Stanhope Forbes
- Year: 1902
- Type: Oil on canvas, genre painting
- Dimensions: 99 cm × 153 cm (39 in × 60 in)
- Location: Worcester City Art Gallery, Worcester

Chadding in Mount's Bay is a 1902 oil painting by the Irish-born English artist Stanhope Forbes. It depicts a rowing boat of children handline fishing (known locally as "chadding") at Mount's Bay in Cornwall. Forbes was a key figure in the Newlyn School of artists and the paintings reflects the influence of Impressionism. It is also known as Chadding on Mount's Bay. The painting was displayed at the Royal Academy Exhibition of 1902 held at Burlington House in London. The picture was acquired by Worcester City Art Gallery in 1914. It has been voted the most popular work in the Gallery's collection.

== Bibliography ==
- Hind, Charles Lewis. Stanhope A. Forbes, Royal Academician. Virtue, 1911.
- Spielmann, Marion Harry (ed.) The Magazine of Art: Volume 26. Cassell, Petter & Galpin, 1902.
