= 1902 in art =

Events from the year 1902 in art.

== Events ==
- 5 May – The Royal Academy Exhibition of 1902 opens at Burlington House in London
- June – The group Boadicea and Her Daughters (1856–83) by Thomas Thornycroft (died 1885) is cast in bronze and erected on the Victoria Embankment in London.
- July – Cecil and Wilfred Phillips open the Leicester Galleries in Leicester Square, London, for exhibitions of modern British and French art.
- September – Paul Cézanne's final studio, at Les Lauves, commanding a view of Montagne Sainte-Victoire, is completed.
- Early October – Beatrix Potter's first children's book The Tale of Peter Rabbit, with her own colour illustrations (originally published privately a year earlier), is first published in a trade edition by Frederick Warne & Co in London. By the end of the year it sells 28,000 copies.
- Georges Braque begins his studies at the Academie Humbert, where he meets Marie Laurencin and Francis Picabia.
- Charles Robert Ashbee moves his Guild and School of Handicraft to Chipping Campden in the English Cotswolds.
- The studio La Ruche is established in the 15th arrondissement of Paris by the sculptor Alfred Boucher to provide accommodation for impoverished young artists.
- Claude Monet begins his Water Lilies series of paintings in his garden at Giverny.
- Edvard Munch exhibits extensively at this year's Berlin Secession, including the first complete showing of his Frieze of Life series. In October he accidentally shoots himself in the hand in the course of breaking up with Tulla Larsen.
- Christopher Whall completes his first major group of stained glass windows in Gloucester Cathedral, England.

== Works ==
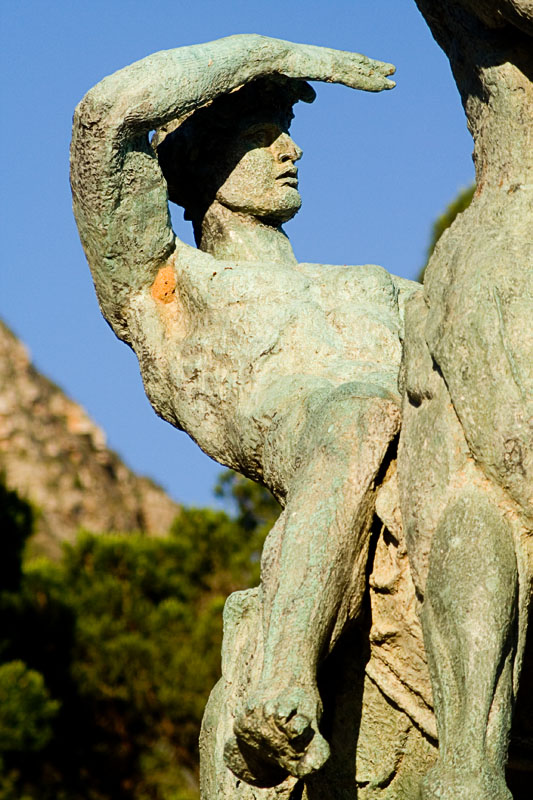
G. F. Watts – Physical Energy, detail of original cast

- Helen Allingham – View of Blackdown
- Frank Weston Benson – Eleanor Holding a Shell
- Pierre Bonnard – The Terrasse Children with Black Dog
- Frank Dicksee – La Belle Dame sans Merci
- Thomas Eakins – Self-portrait
- Feinhold Felderhoff – Amphitrite Fountain (sculpture, Szczecin, Poland)
- Stanhope Forbes – Chadding in Mount's Bay
- J. W. Godward
  - Ionian Dancing Girl
  - An Italian Girl's Head
- Vilhelm Hammershøi – Five Portraits
- Gwen John – Self-Portrait
- Gustav Klimt
  - Beethoven Frieze (Secession hall (Austria))
  - Beech Grove I
  - Portrait of Emilie Flöge
  - Insel im Attersee (Island in the Attersee) (c.)
- Max Liebermann – Terrace at the Restaurant Jacob in Niestedten on the Elbe
- Margaret MacDonald
  - Oh ye, all ye that walk in Willowood (gesso panel for Willow Tearooms, Glasgow)
  - The Red Rose and the White Rose
- Jacek Malczewski – Angel of Death
- Henri Matisse – Notre-Dame, une fin d'après-midi
- William Orpen – The Chess Players
- Walter Osborne – Tea in the Garden
- Pablo Picasso – Femme aux Bras Croisés
- Edward Poynter – The Vision of Endymion
- Paul Ranson – Apple Tree with Red Berries
- William Blake Richmond – Hera in the House of Hephaistos
- Auguste Rodin – The Thinker (bronze)
- John Singer Sargent
  - The Acheson Sisters
  - Lord Ribblesdale
  - Portrait of the Duchess of Portland
- Rudolf Siemering – Bison (bronze, Berlin)
- Max Slevogt – The Singer Francisco D'Andrade as Don Giovanni in Mozart's Opera ("The White d'Andrade")
- Alfred Stieglitz – photographs
  - The Hand of Man
  - Spring Showers, The Coach
- Henry Scott Tuke – Ruby, Gold and Malachite
- John William Waterhouse – The Missal
- George Frederic Watts – Physical Energy (original bronze cast, sent to southern Africa)
- Stanisław Wyspiański – Self-portrait

== Births ==
=== January to June ===
- January 15 – Paul Kelpe, German-born American painter (died 1985)
- January 19 – David Olère, Polish-born Jewish French painter (died 1985)
- January 30 – Nikolaus Pevsner, German-born British art historian (died 1983)
- February 3 – Dolly Rudeman, Dutch graphic designer (died 1980)
- February 20 – Ansel Adams, American photographer (died 1984)
- February 24 – Nedeljko Gvozdenović, Serbian painter (died 1988)
- February 26 – Jean Bruller, French writer and illustrator (died 1991)
- February 27 – Ľudovít Fulla, Slovak painter, graphic artist, illustrator, stage designer and art teacher (died 1980)
- March 3 – Isabel Bishop, American painter and graphic artist (died 1988)
- March 16 – Lucie Rie, Austrian-born British studio potter (died 1995)
- April 2 – Jan Tschichold, German typographer, book designer, teacher and writer (died 1974)
- April 26 – Isaac Soyer, Russian-born American painter, (died 1981)
- May 24 – Sylvia Daoust, Canadian sculptor (died 2004)
- June 24 – Thea Tewi, German-born American sculptor and lingerie designer (died 1999)

=== July to December ===
- August 5 – I. Rice Pereira, American abstract painter and writer (died 1971)
- August 18 – Adamson-Eric, Estonian artist (died 1968)
- September 2 – Peter Pitseolak, Inuit photographer, artist and historian (died 1973)
- September 10 – Lee Gatch, American painter and muralist (died 1968)
- September 18 – Peter S. Pezzati, American portrait painter (died 1993)
- September 28 – Kenzo Okada, Japanese-born painter (died 1982)
- October 10 – Dick Ket, Dutch magic realist painter (died 1940)
- October 20 – Enid Marx, English textile designer (died 1998)
- November 4 – Pierre Edouard Leopold Verger, French photographer and ethnographer (died 1996)
- November 11 – Ernő Goldfinger, Hungarian-born architect and furniture designer (died 1987)
- November 21 – Marko Čelebonović, Serbian painter (died 1986)
- December 8 – Wifredo Lam, Cuban artist (died 1982)

=== Undated ===
- Situ Qiao, Chinese painter (died 1958)

== Deaths ==
- January 6 – Lars Hertervig, Norwegian painter (b. 1830)
- February 7 – Thomas Sidney Cooper, English painter of farm scenes (b. 1803)
- February 18 – Albert Bierstadt, German American landscape painter (b. 1830)
- March 21 – Vincenzo Cabianca, Italian painter (b. 1827)
- April 12 – Ernest Gambart, Belgian-born English art dealer (b. 1814)
- April 15 – Jules Dalou, French sculptor (b. 1838)
- May 20 – Matthew Ridley Corbet, English neoclassical painter (b. 1850)
- June 11 – Otto Eckmann, German painter and graphic artist (b. 1865)
- July 28 – Jehan Georges Vibert, French academic painter (b. 30 September 1840)
- August 8
  - James Tissot, French-born painter (b. 1836)
  - John Henry Twachtman, American impressionist landscape painter and member of the Cos Cob Art Colony (b. 1853)
- October 16 – Jeronimo Suñol, Spanish sculptor (b. 1839)
- December 7 – Thomas Nast, German American cartoonist (b. 1840)
- date unknown – Fabio Borbottoni, Italian painter of vedute (born 1820)
