= Bison (Siemering) =

Bronze sculpture by Rudolf Siemering in Berlin, Germany

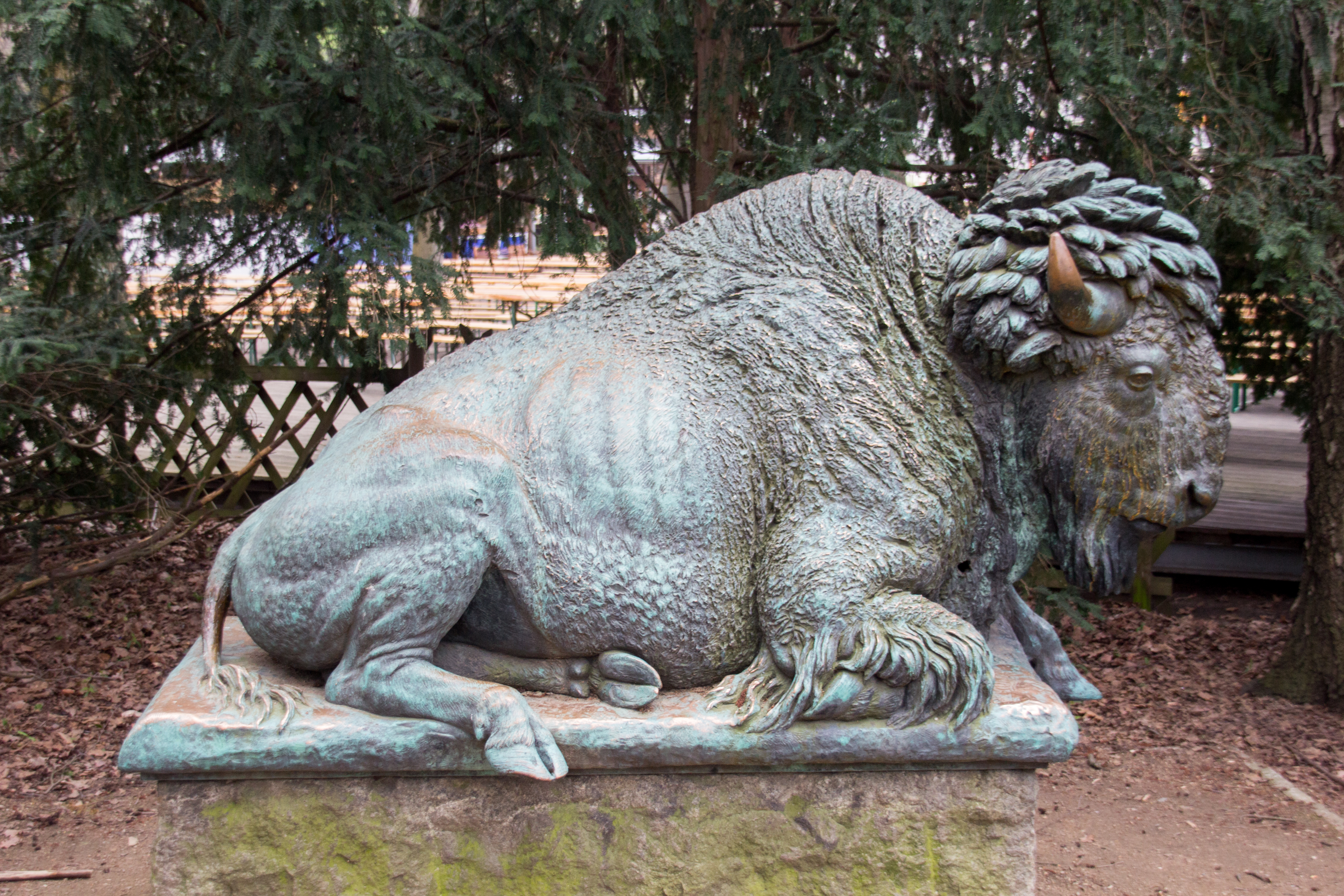
- The statue in 2017
- Artist: Rudolf Siemering
- Location: Berlin, Germany

Bison (German: Liegender Bison) is an outdoor 1902 bronze sculpture of a bison by German sculptor Rudolf Siemering, installed in Tiergarten, Berlin, Germany. The first cast was for the Washington Monument dedicated in 1897 in Philadelphia.

== See also ==
- 1902 in art
