= Eakins Oval =

Traffic circle in Pennsylvania, US

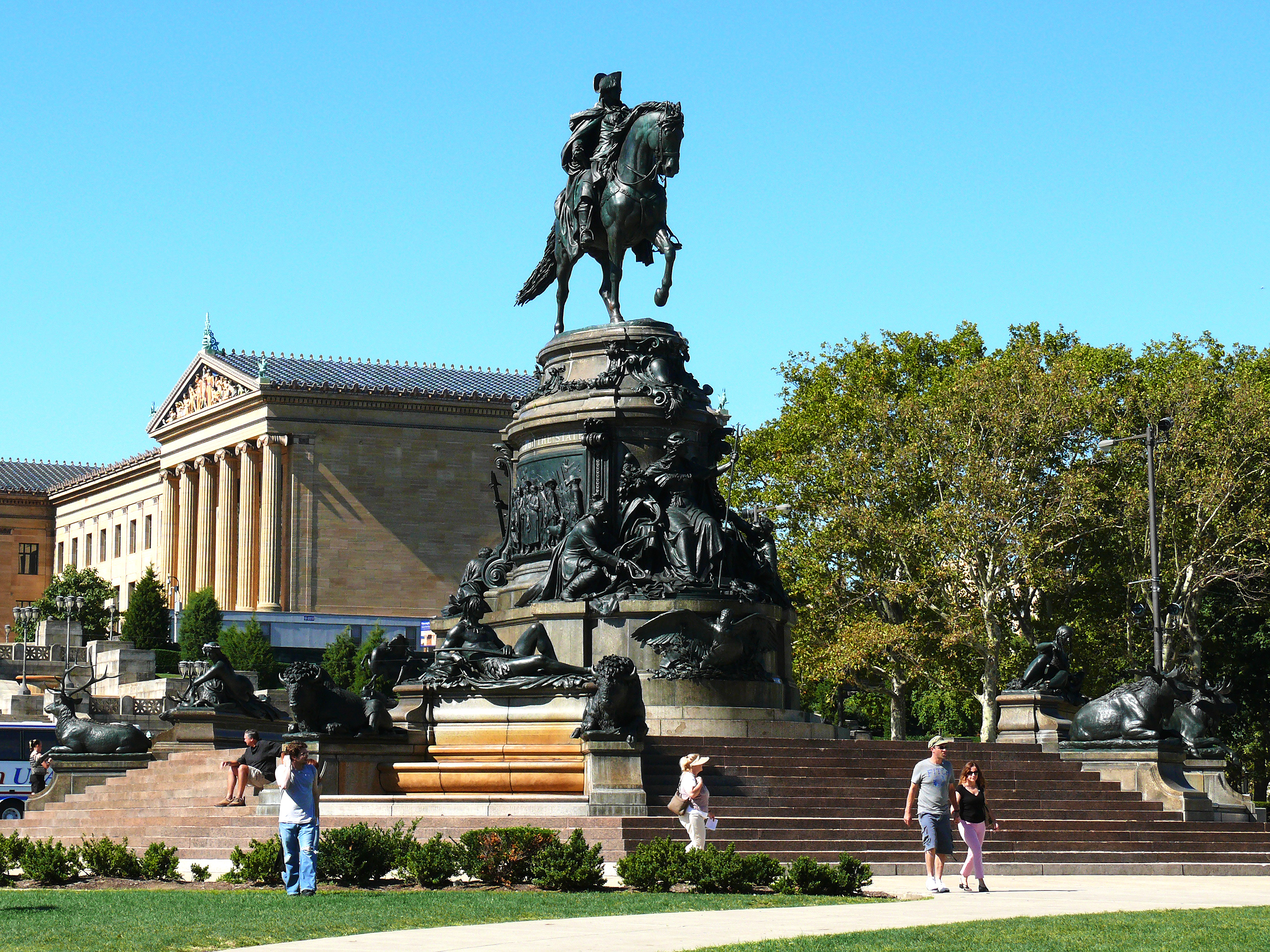
- Washington Monument at Eakins Oval
- Interactive map of Eakins Oval

Location
- Fairmount Park, Philadelphia, Pennsylvania, U.S.
- Coordinates: 39°57′49″N 75°10′43″W
- Roads at junction: Benjamin Franklin Parkway; Spring Garden Street; Kelly Drive; Martin Luther King Jr. Drive; 24th Street

Construction
- Lanes: 3-5
- Maintained by: City of Philadelphia

Eakins Oval is a traffic circle in Philadelphia. It forms the northwest end of the Benjamin Franklin Parkway just in front of the Philadelphia Museum of Art, with a central array of fountains and monuments, and a network of pedestrian walkways.

This loop of road usually carries a large volume of traffic, as it connects the core of the city with Fairmount Park, Kelly Drive (formerly East River Drive), and Martin Luther King, Jr. Drive (formerly West River Drive). During parades and other major municipal events such as the Thanksgiving Day Parade, and large concerts such as Live 8 Philadelphia and the Budweiser Made in America Festival, the roadways are shut down to automobile traffic and the oval becomes center stage for the gathering. Eakins Oval was the site of the stage for the 2017 NFL draft.

The oval was part of urban planner Jacques Gréber's design for the Benjamin Franklin Parkway, which he proposed in 1917.

The oval is named for Thomas Eakins, a Philadelphian, world-famous realist painter, and fine arts educator.

The southeastern part of the oval serves as a parking lot; it was originally part of the Parkway until traffic modifications isolated it in the 1960s.

== The Washington Monument ==
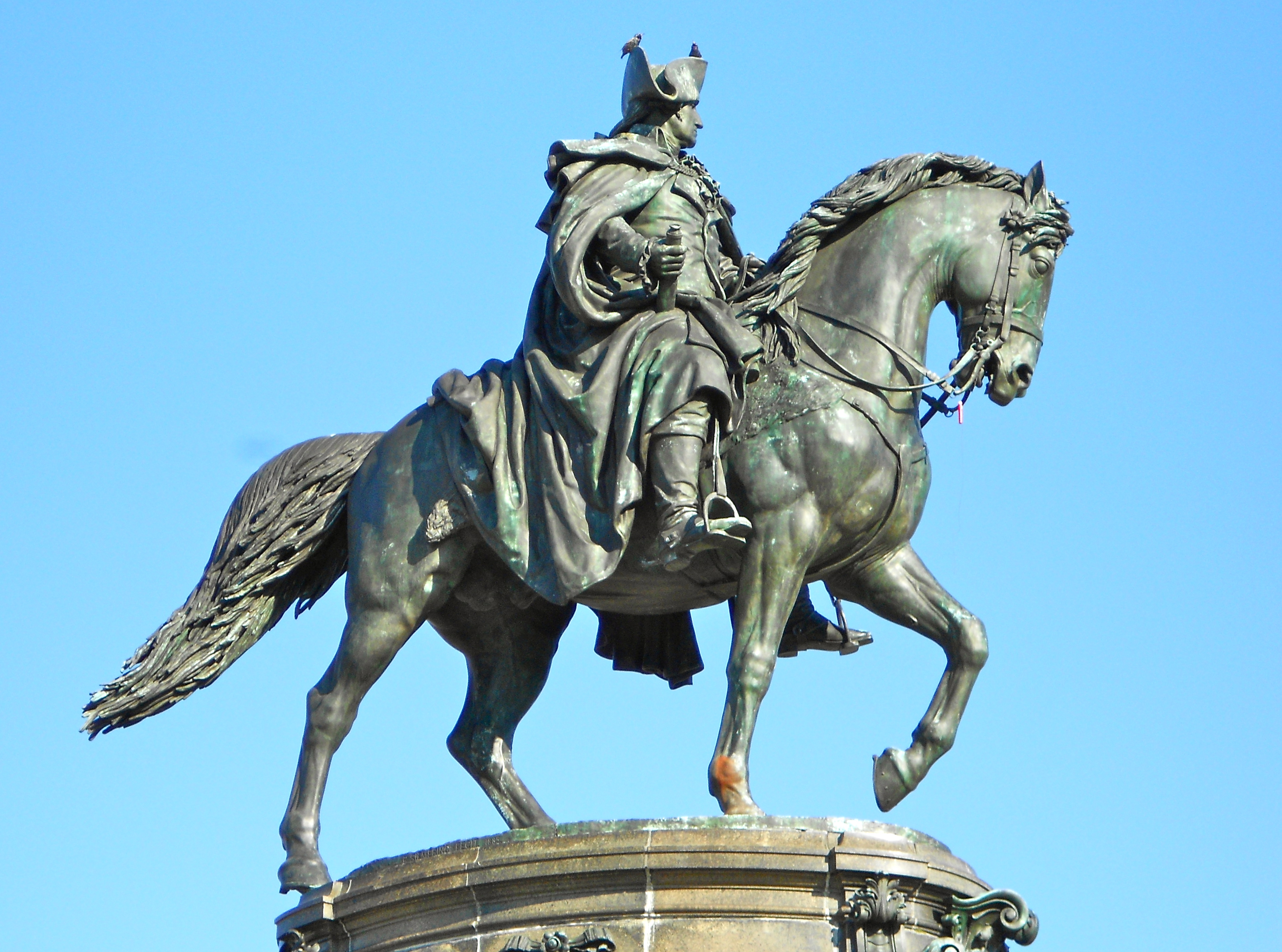
Washington Monument – Horse and rider

Just inside the northwest edge of Eakins Oval, in front of the Philadelphia Museum of Art stairs, stands the Washington Monument fountain. It was commissioned and designed by sculptor Rudolf Siemering. The sculpture was dedicated in 1897 at the Green Street entrance to Fairmount Park.

It was moved in 1926 to its present location after construction of the Benjamin Franklin Parkway was completed. In 1997, work to restore the statue began under the direction of Margo Berg of the Philadelphia Art Commission. Over the years, the sculpture had come loose from its base, and the fountain had ceased to function properly. The restoration was completed in June of the same year, 100 years after it was dedicated.

The bronze and granite sculpture features a uniformed George Washington mounted on a horse. Washington and his horse are poised on top of the fountain, facing southeast down Benjamin Franklin Parkway towards Philadelphia City Hall. The face of the sculpture was made from an impression of the former president made while he was still alive. The lowest level of the monument features Native Americans and animals that are native to the United States.

== Other fountains ==
The Washington Monument fountain is flanked by two smaller fountains, honoring Eli Kirk Price and John Ericsson.

== Transportation tunnels ==
Beneath Eakins Oval and the surrounding area run two tunnels, originally for rail traffic, and constructed in the 1920s at the same time as the Oval, the Benjamin Franklin Parkway, and the Philadelphia Museum of Art. The lower tunnel, built for the Baltimore and Ohio Railroad, is owned by successor CSX and carries freight trains on a single track. The upper tunnel carried streetcars on the Spring Garden Street line (Route 43) of Philadelphia Rapid Transit (PRT) and successor Philadelphia Transportation Company (PTC) until 1956. This double-track tunnel was then completely rebuilt in 1960 to carry two lanes of one-way (westbound only) traffic on Spring Garden from Pennsylvania Avenue to the Spring Garden Street Bridge over the Schuylkill River; currently only one lane is in use. This tunnel crosses above the CSX tunnel in the middle. Today's Route 43 buses, operated by SEPTA, circle the Oval and do not use the tunnel.

== See also ==
- Center City, Philadelphia
- List of parks in Philadelphia
