= Benjamin Franklin Parkway =

Parkway in Philadelphia

Coordinates: 39.9637°N 75.1787°W

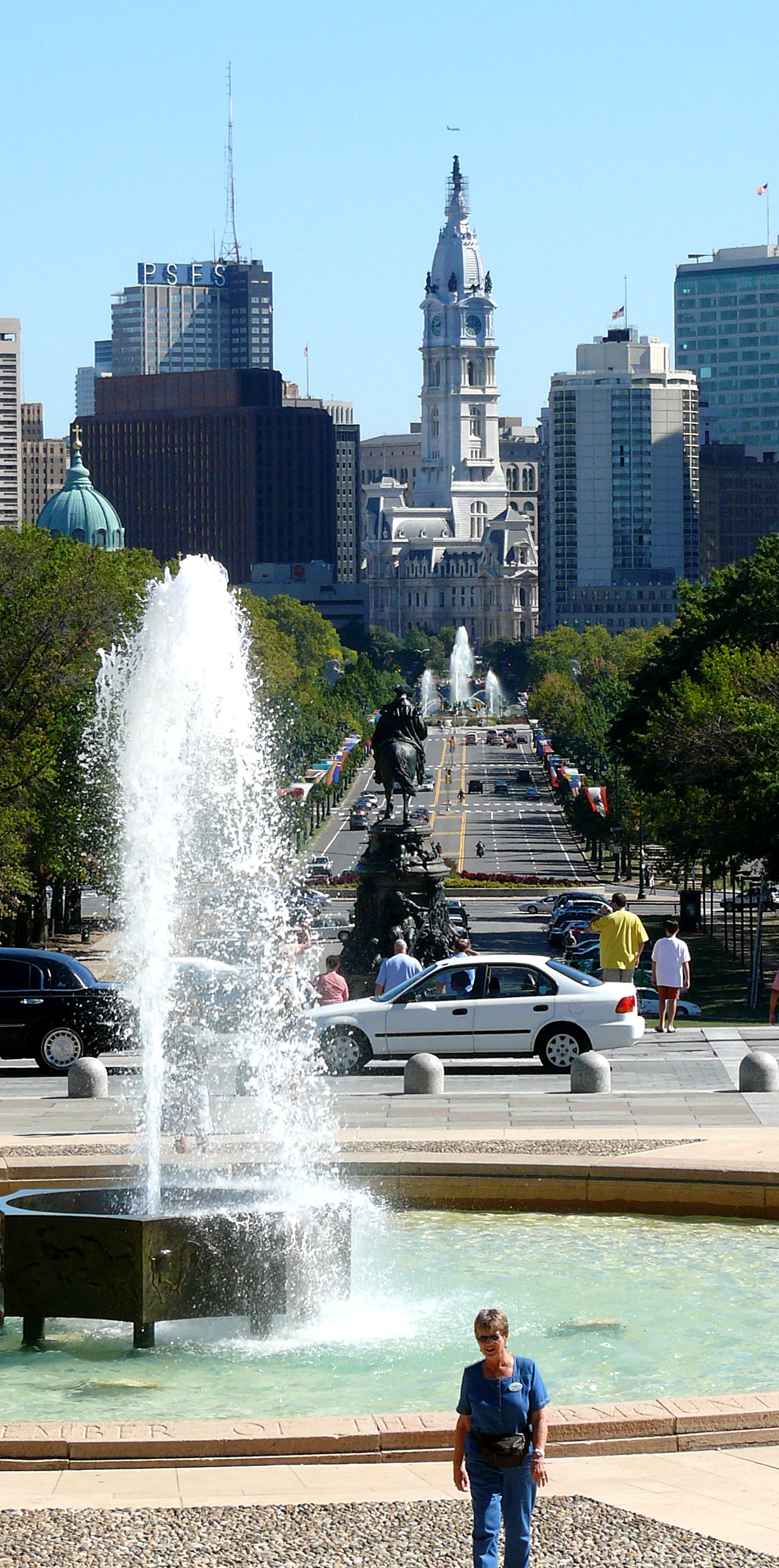
- Benjamin Franklin Parkway from the top of the steps of the Philadelphia Museum of Art

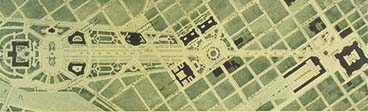
- "Plan for the Fairmount Parkway", published in 1917 by Jacques Gréber
- Namesake: Benjamin Franklin
- Maintained by: City of Philadelphia
- Length: 1.0 mi (1.6 km)
- Location: Philadelphia, Pennsylvania, U.S.
- West end: Eakins Oval in Fairmount Park
- East end: 16th and Arch Streets in Logan Square

Benjamin Franklin Parkway, commonly abbreviated to Ben Franklin Parkway and colloquially called the Parkway, is a boulevard that runs through the Philadelphia, Pennsylvania, United States. It is named for Philadelphia resident and U.S. Founding Father Benjamin Franklin. The mile-long parkway cuts diagonally across the grid plan pattern of Center City's northwest quadrant, starting at Philadelphia City Hall, curving around Logan Circle, and ending before the Philadelphia Museum of Art.

== History ==
=== 20th century ===
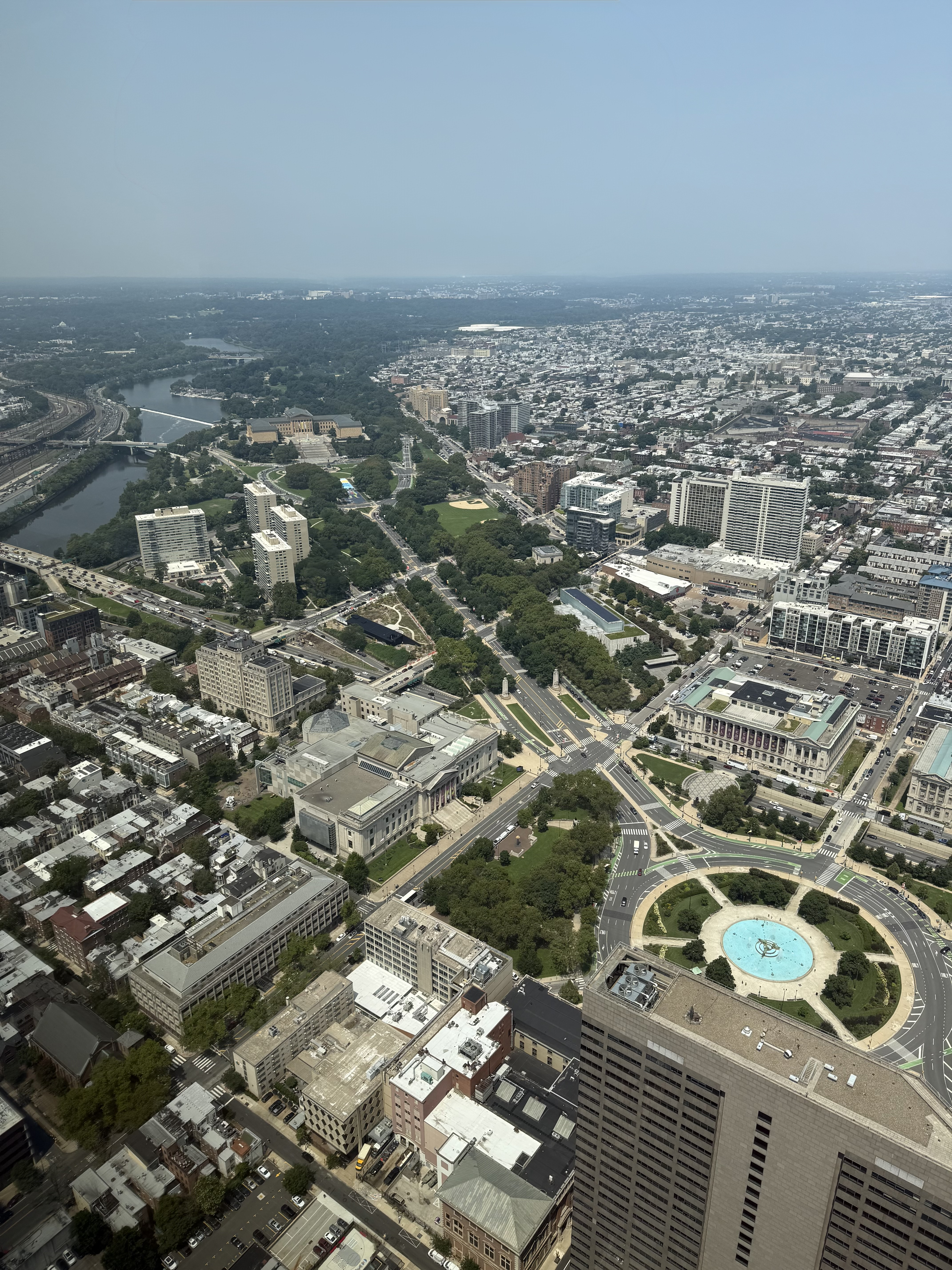
Benjamin Franklin Parkway with Logan Circle in the foreground and the Philadelphia Museum of Art in the background

In a city famous for its urban planning, the Parkway represents one of the earliest examples of urban renewal in the United States. The road was constructed to ease heavy industrial congestion in Center City and to restore Philadelphia's natural and artistic beauty, as part of the City Beautiful movement.

The vision for a grand parkway came from retail pioneer John Wanamaker. Preliminary proposals for the Parkway had been produced and added to the City Plan by 1906, but the first comprehensive plan for the Parkway was commissioned in 1907 by the Fairmount Park Art Association, now the Association for Public Art. The Association commissioned architects Horace Trumbauer, Clarence Zantzinger, and Paul Philippe Cret, who created a detailed parkway design that was formally added to the City Plan in 1909. Construction on the Parkway did not begin until 1917, when French landscape architect Jacques Gréber submitted a revised plan to the Commissioners of Fairmount Park.

Gréber designed the Parkway in 1917 to emulate the Champs-Élysées in Paris, France. The route was determined by an axis drawn from Philadelphia City Hall to a fixed point on the hill that William Penn called "Fairmount", now the site of the Philadelphia Museum of Art. The Champs-Élysées terminates at the Arc de Triomphe, and the Parkway's terminating at the Art Museum gives the notion of "a slice of Paris in Philadelphia." The Parkway contains flags of countries from around the world.

The traffic rotary on the western end of the Parkway, at the foot of the Art Museum's Rocky Steps, is named Eakins Oval after Philadelphia painter Thomas Eakins. The traffic lanes around Eakins Oval originally formed a regular oval; this pattern was modified in the early 1960s to its present elongated circular shape, with the truncated lanes serving as staging areas for various events.

=== 21st century ===
On July 2, 2005, the steps of the museum played host to the Philadelphia venue of Live 8, where artists such as Dave Matthews Band, Linkin Park and Maroon 5 performed.

In Spring 2012, a new museum for the Barnes Foundation's collection of Impressionist art on the site between the Free Library and the Rodin Museum opened in Spring 2012.

The Parkway has been used for several subsequent editions of the Made in America Festival. The Parkway was also the site of Jay-Z's Made in America Festival on September 1–2, 2012, featuring Jay-Z, Pearl Jam, Skrillex, Calvin Harris, and others.

On September 26 and 27, 2015, Pope Francis visited Philadelphia for that year's World Meeting of Families; the Parkway was flooded with over a million visitors both weekend days, a Celebration of Families on Saturday, and a Holy Mass on Sunday.

There has been concern that the original plan of a wide, multi-sectioned, multi-lane, tree-lined boulevard, while beautiful to travel on, is not very engaging for pedestrian or other public use. Traffic along the Parkway has decreased considerably because of the completion of Interstate 676 (Vine Street Expressway), linking the Schuylkill Expressway with the Benjamin Franklin Bridge. The roadway was since narrowed somewhat and the sidewalks expanded around Logan Circle. A plan for a greener, more walkable Parkway was released by the city in 2023.

As of 2023, the Parkway is part of Philadelphia's High Injury Network, the small fraction of streets on which the majority of traffic deaths and serious injuries occur.

== Attractions ==
The Parkway is the spine of Philadelphia's Museum District.

Some of the city's most famous sights are located here: Cathedral Basilica of Saints Peter and Paul; Swann Memorial Fountain; Parkway Central Library, the Family Court Building, the Franklin Institute, Moore College of Art and Design, the Academy of Natural Sciences, the Rodin Museum, Eakins Oval, the Calder Gardens, the Barnes Foundation, and the Philadelphia Museum of Art. From its northern end, the Parkway provides access to Fairmount Park through Kelly Drive (formerly East River Drive), Martin Luther King Drive (formerly West River Drive), the Schuylkill River Trail, and the Schuylkill Expressway (I-76).

The Parkway also is an outdoor sculpture garden. Works include: The Thinker by Auguste Rodin, The Gates of Hell also by Rodin, LOVE by Robert Indiana, The Ideal Scout by Robert Tait McKenzie, Three-Way Piece by Henry Moore, the three River figures in the Swann Memorial Fountain by Alexander Stirling Calder, Shakespeare Memorial also by Calder, Monument to Six Million Jewish Martyrs by Nathan Rapoport at the Horwitz-Wasserman Holocaust Memorial Plaza, Joseph Leidy by Samuel Murray, Aero Memorial by Paul Manship, General Galusha Pennypacker by Charles Grafly and Albert Laessle, Jesus Breaking Bread by Walter Erlebacher, All Wars Colored Soldiers and Sailors Memorial by J. Otto Schweizer, Thaddeus Kosciuszko by Robert Aitken, Civil War Soldiers and Sailors Memorial by Hermon Atkins MacNeil, Kopernik by Dudley Vaill Talcott, Joan of Arc by Emmanuel Fremiet, Washington Monument by Rudolf Siemering, and the Rocky statue by A. Thomas Schomberg.

== Gallery ==
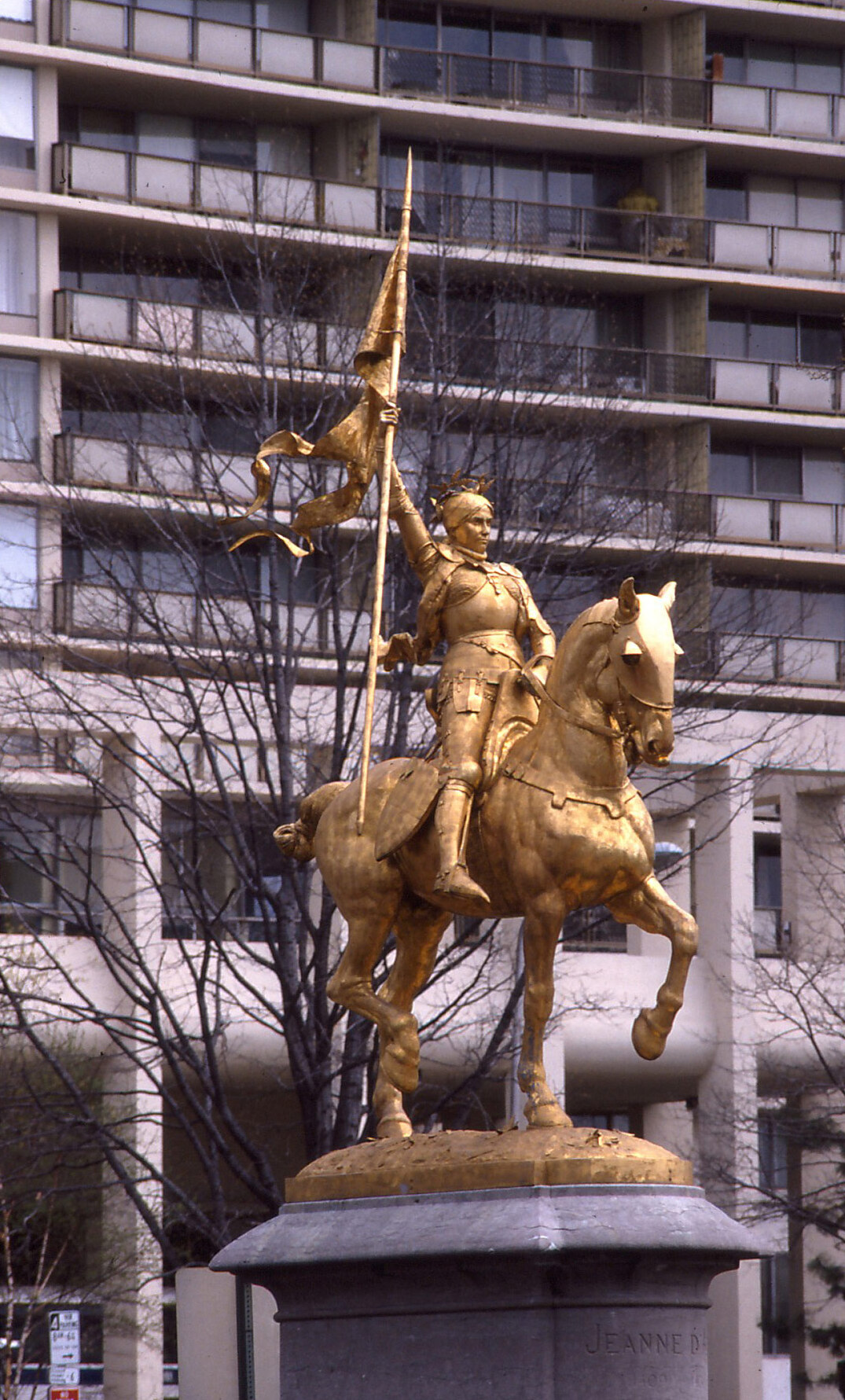
Joan of Arc by Emmanuel Frémiet (1890)

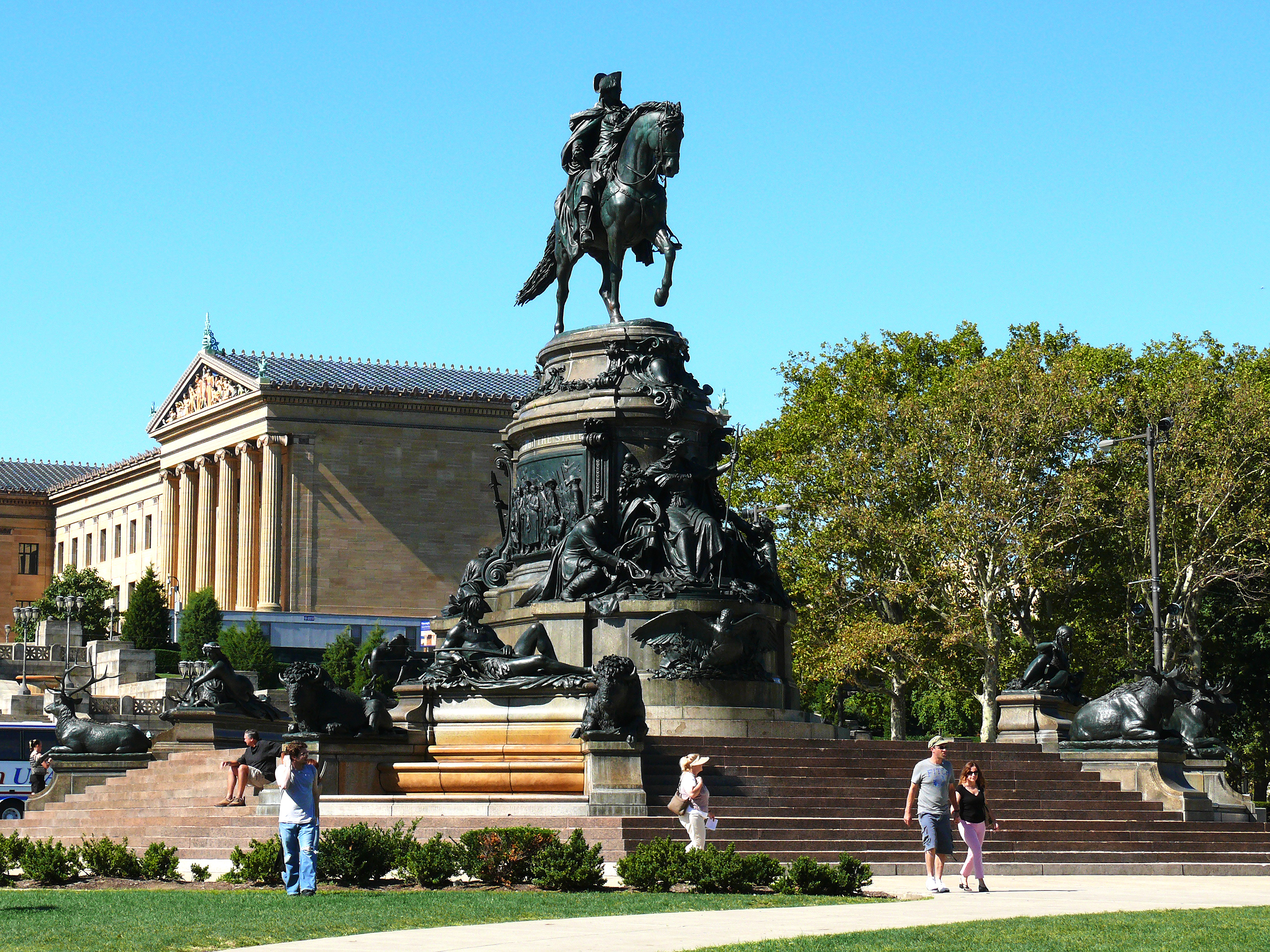
Washington Monument by Rudolf Siemering (1897)

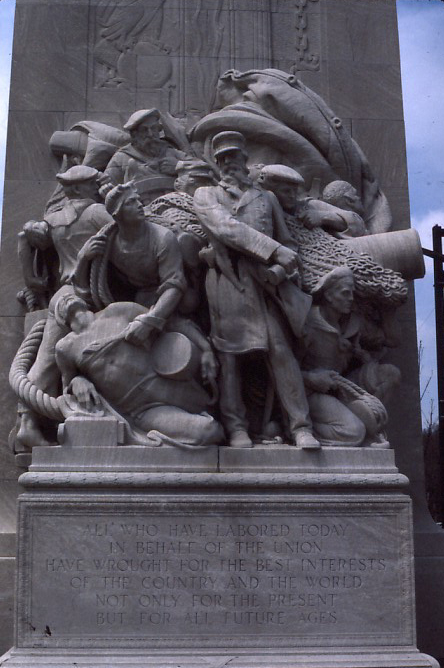
Civil War Sailors Memorial by Hermon Atkins MacNeil (1921)

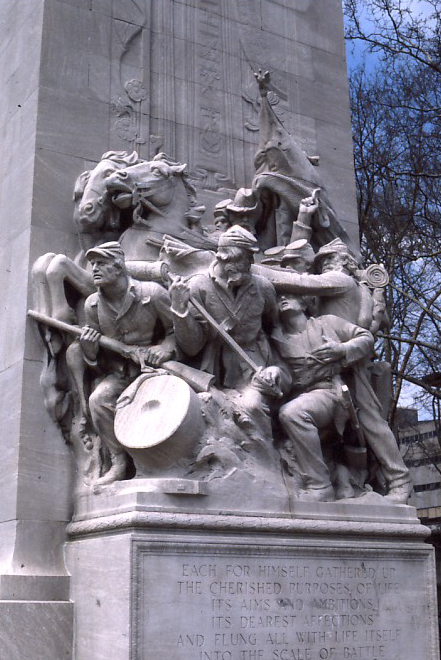
Civil War Soldiers Memorial by Hermon Atkins MacNeil (1921)

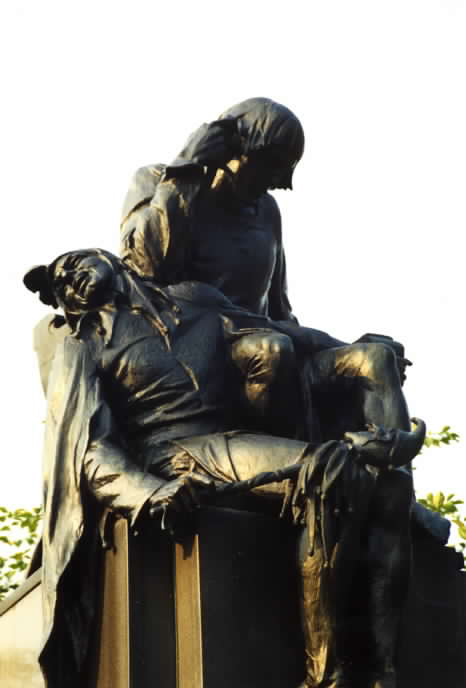
Shakespeare Memorial by Alexander Stirling Calder (1926)

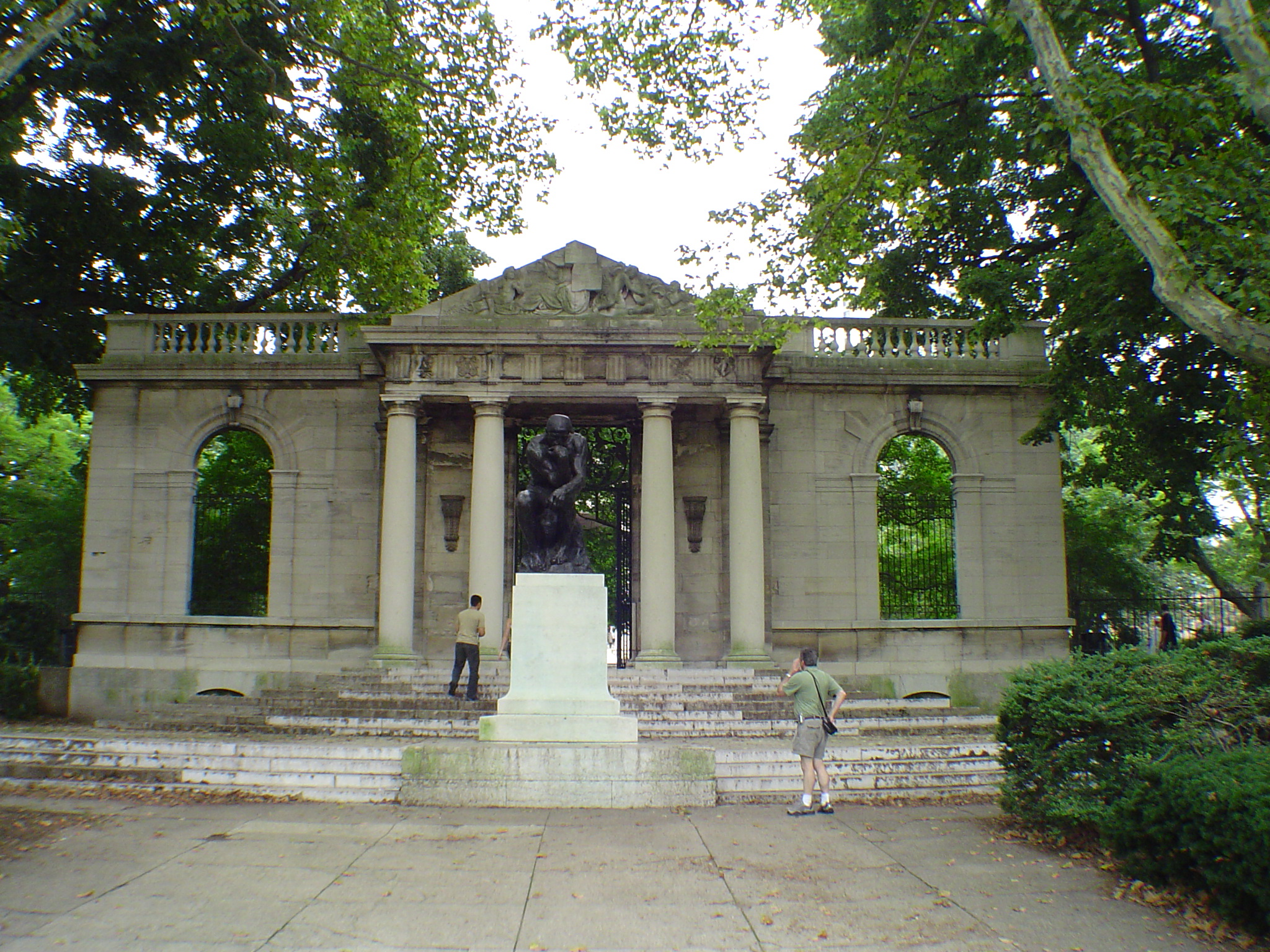
The Thinker in front of the Rodin Museum (1926)

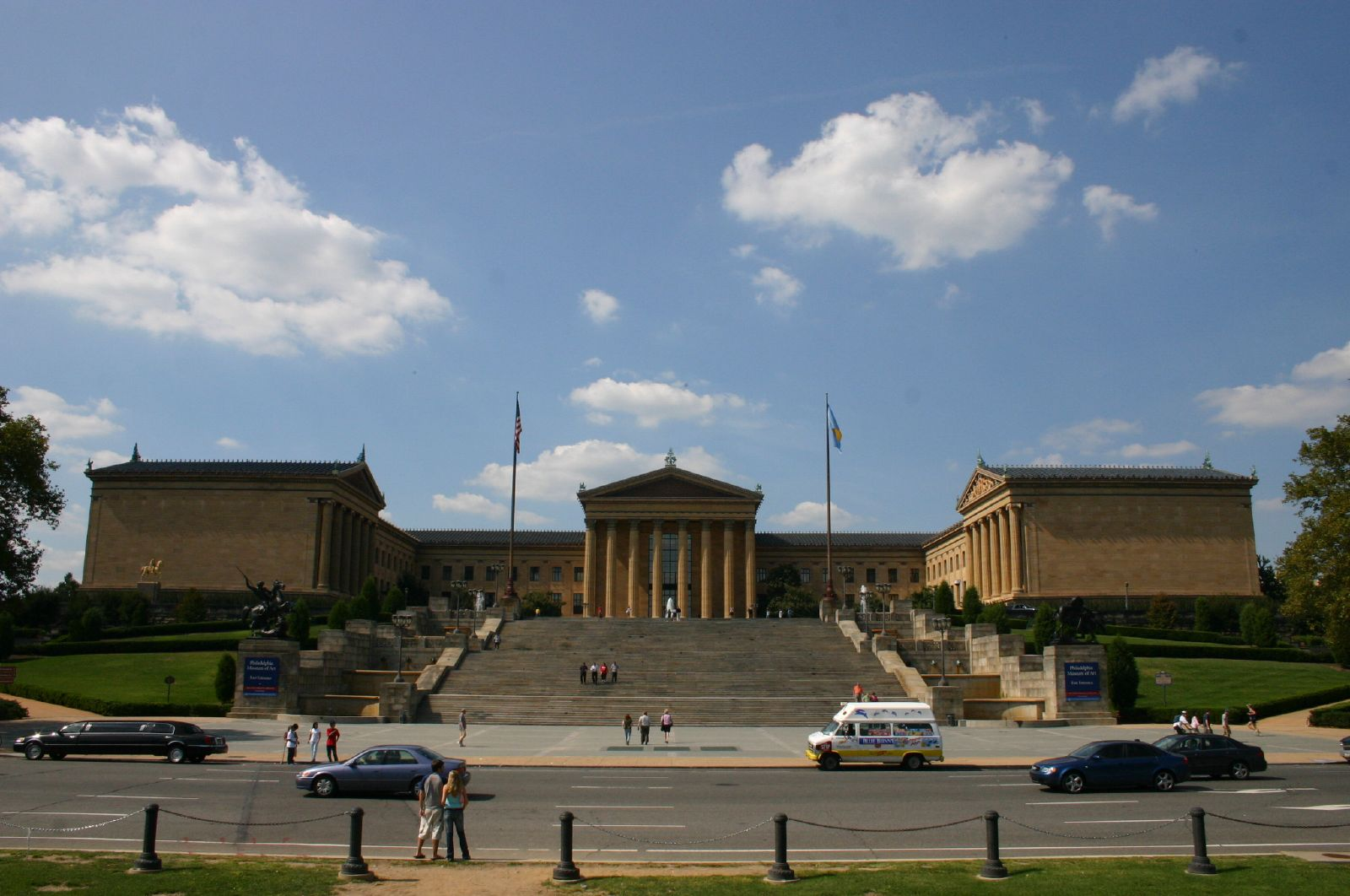
Philadelphia Museum of Art (1928)

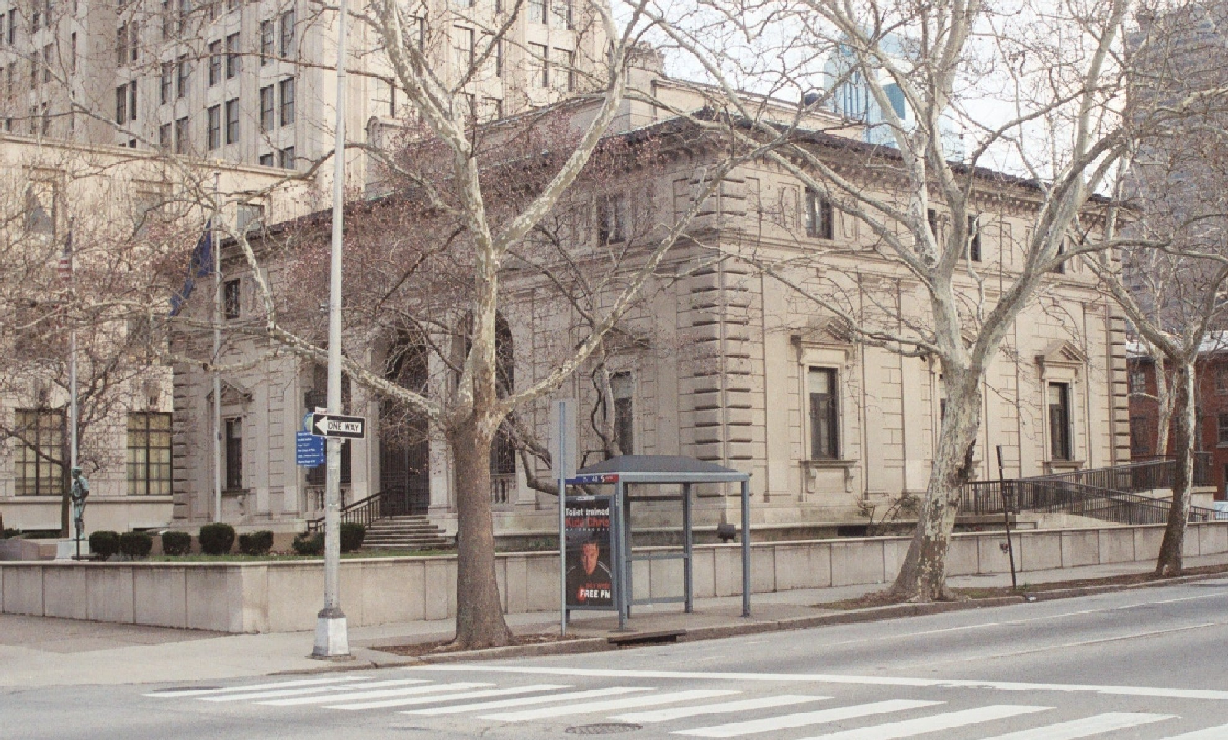
Former Boy Scout Building (1929)

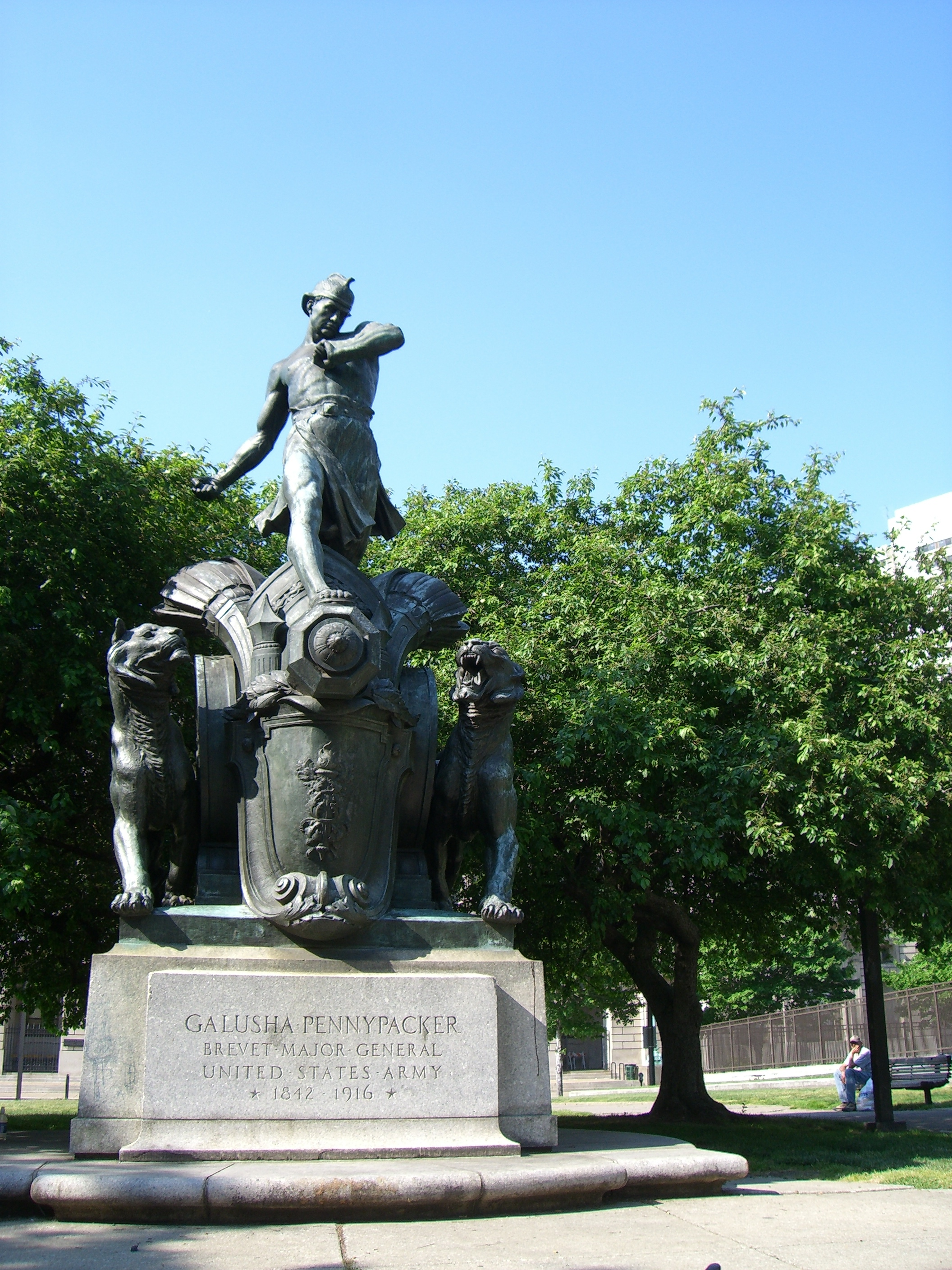
General Galusha Pennypacker by Charles Grafly and Albert Laessle (1934)

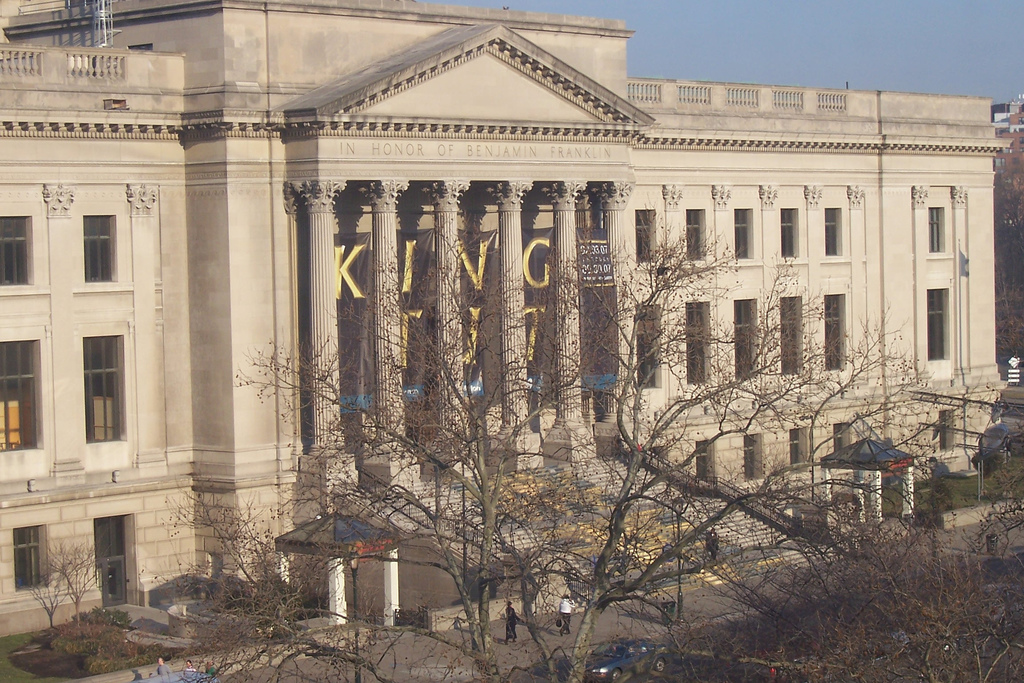
Franklin Institute (1934)

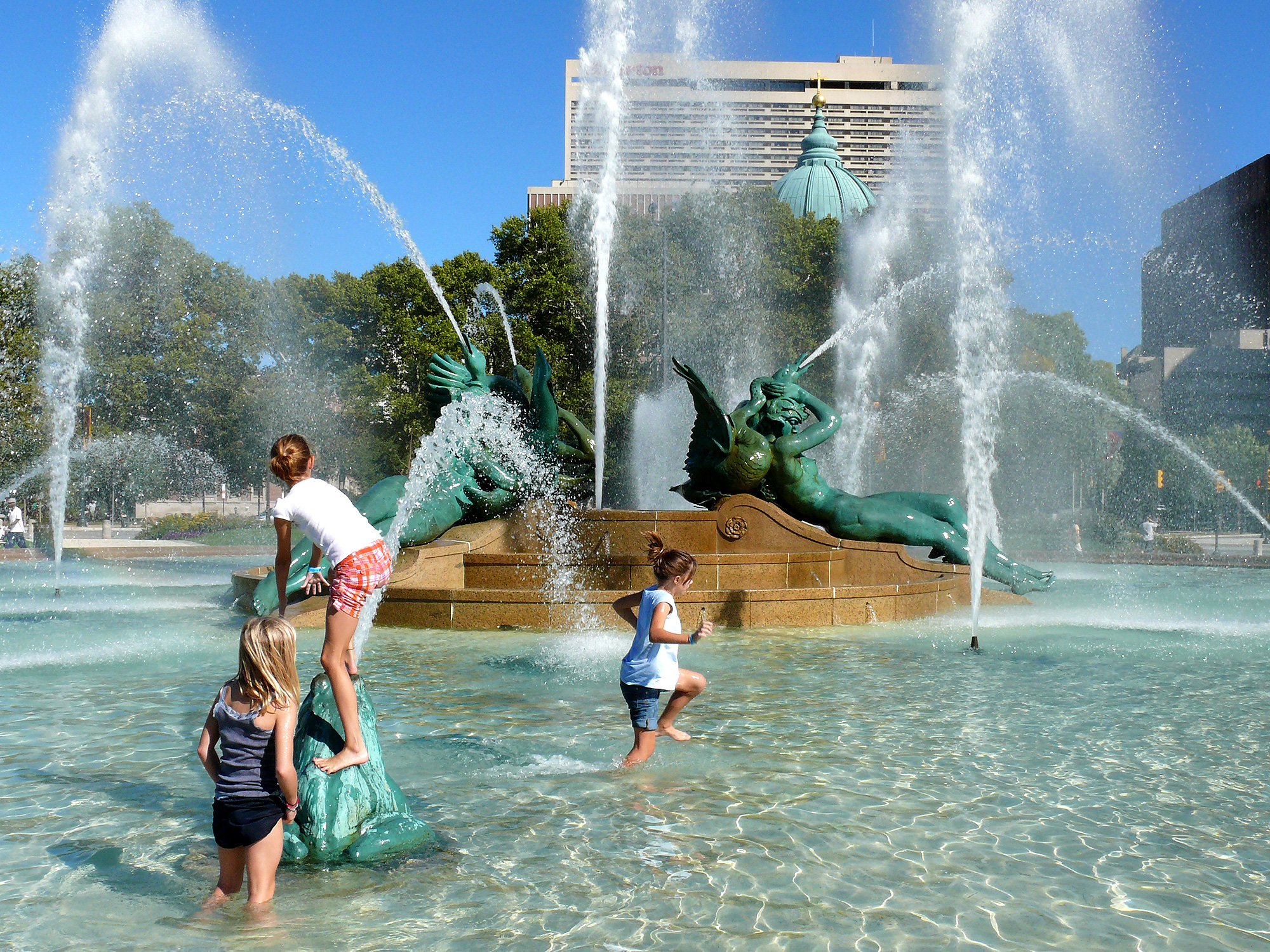
Swann Memorial Fountain at the center of Logan Circle

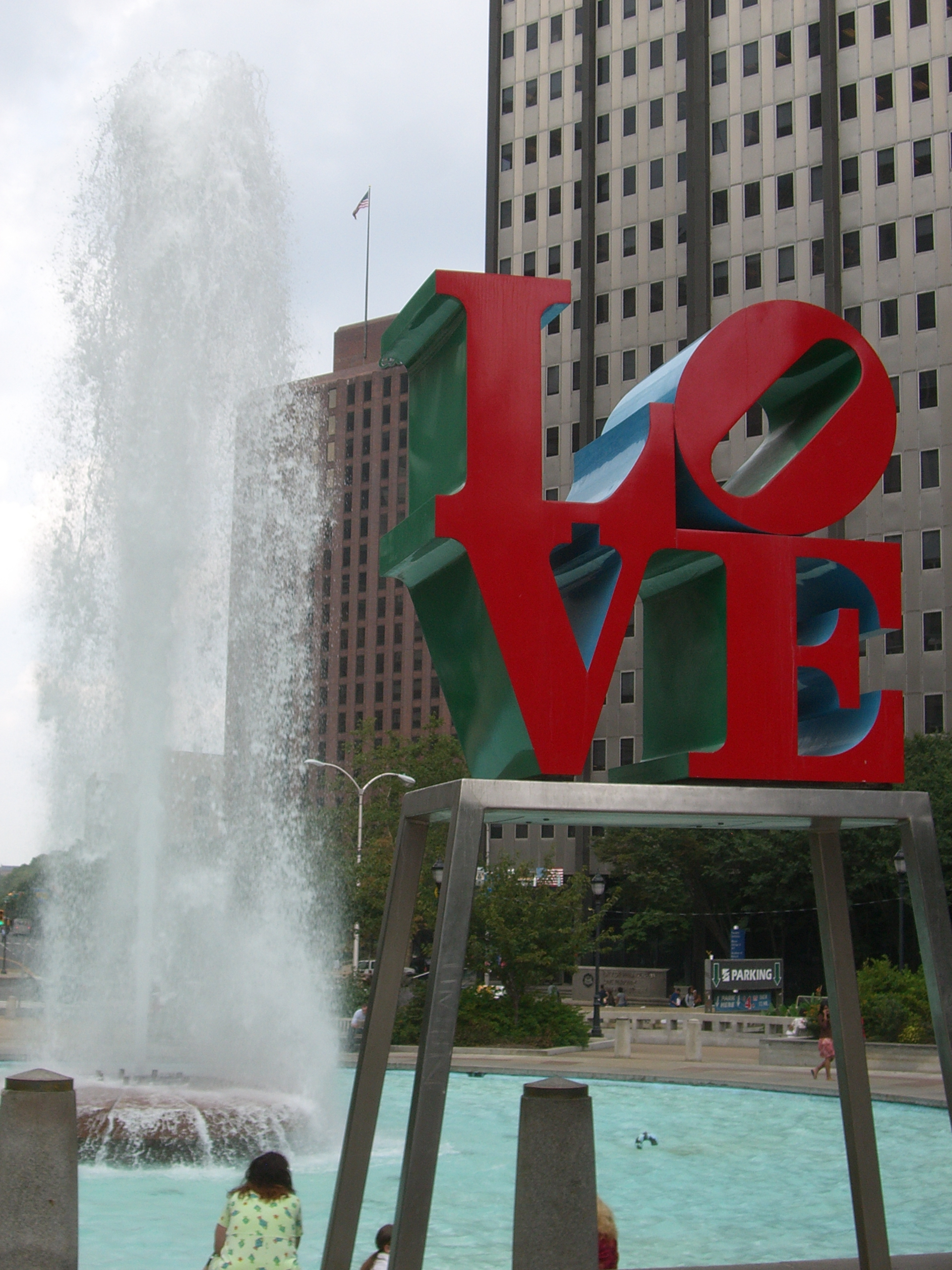
LOVE by Robert Indiana, in LOVE Park

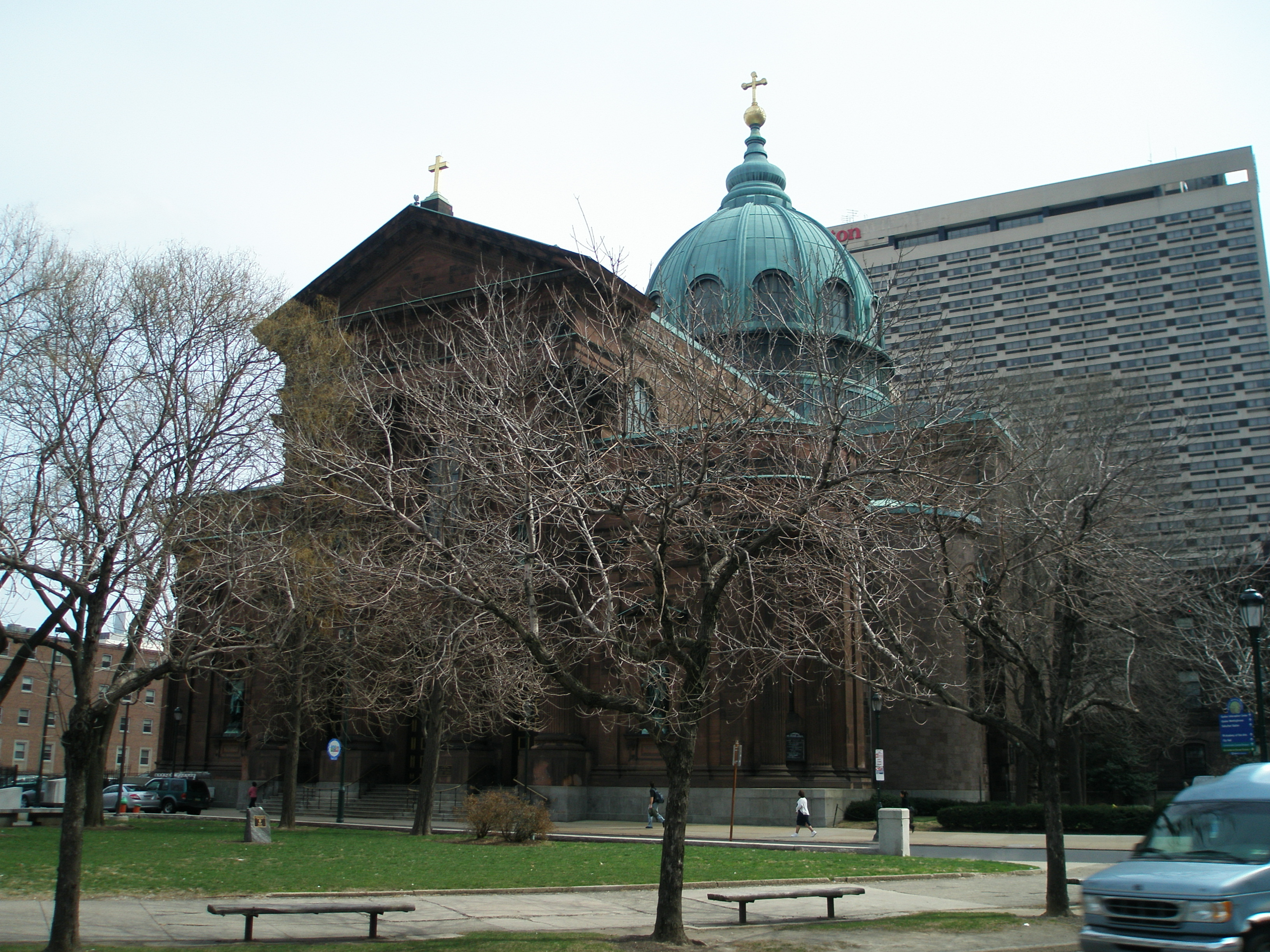
Cathedral Basilica of Saints Peter and Paul

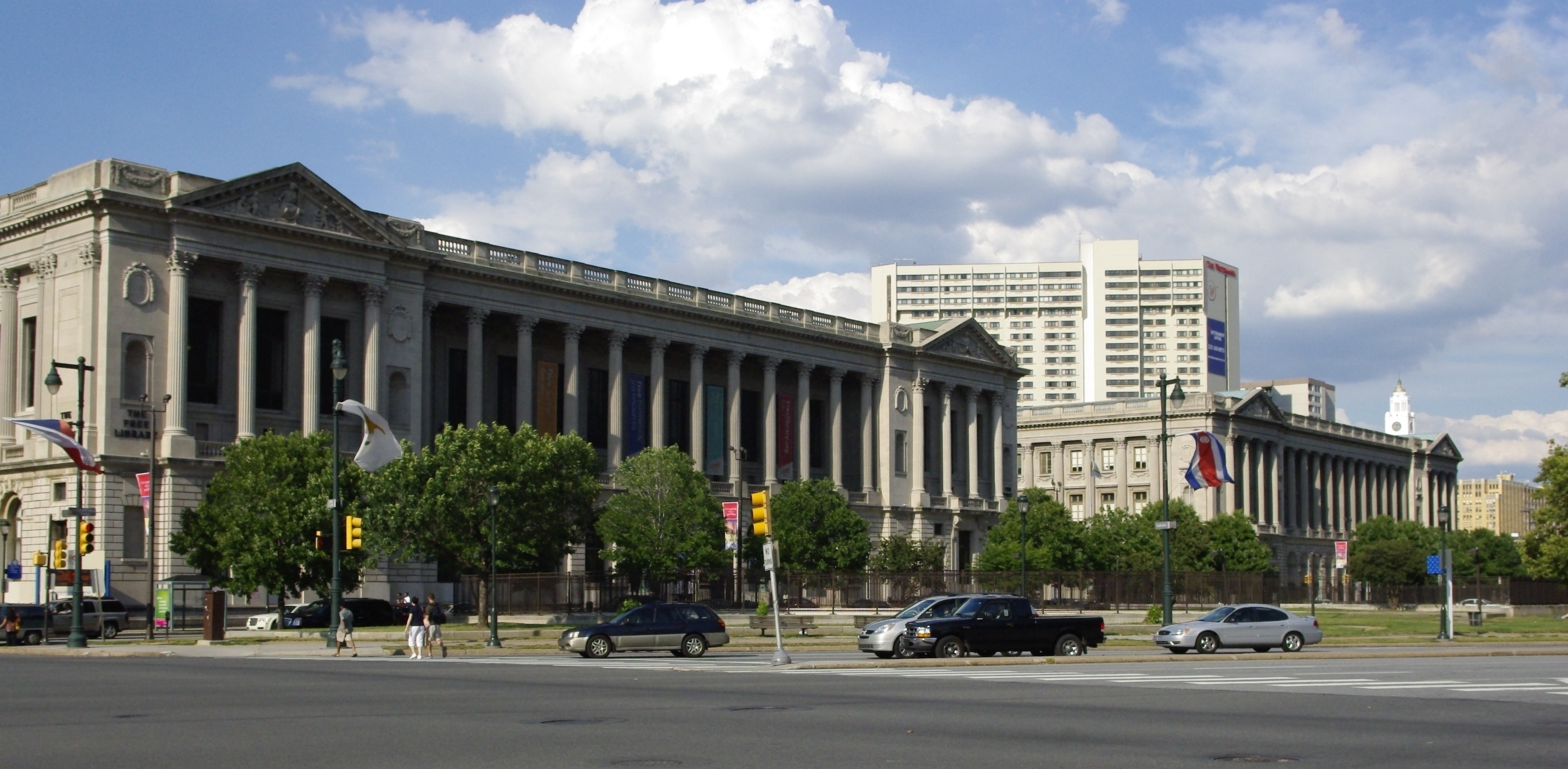
Parkway Central Library (left), and Family Court of Philadelphia (right)

== See also ==
- Academy of Natural Sciences
- Jacques Gréber
- Rocky Steps
