= Washington Monument (Philadelphia) =

1897 monumental sculpture by Rudolf Siemering in Philadelphia

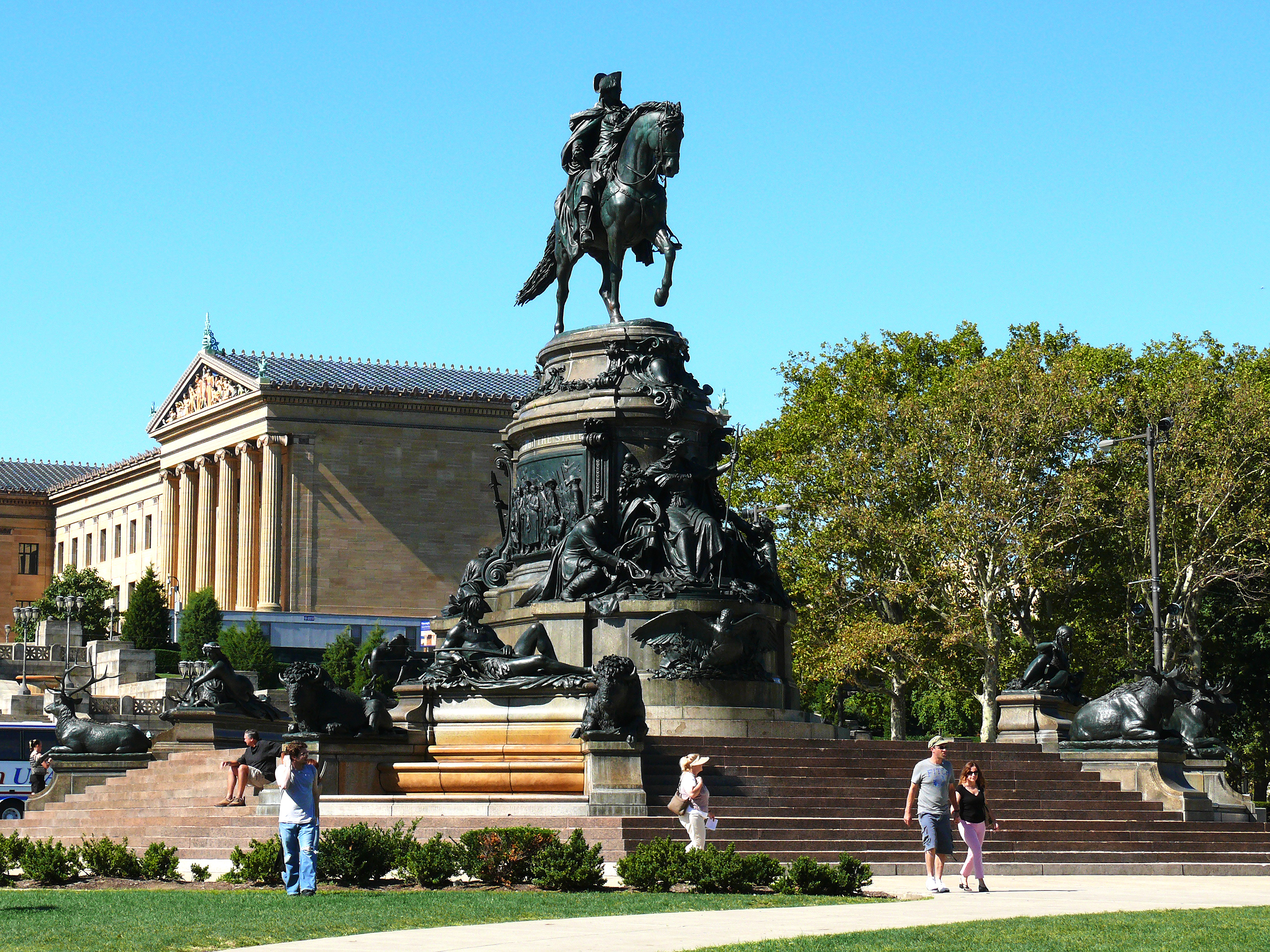
- Washington Monument by Rudolf Siemering
- Artist: Rudolf Siemering
- Year: Dedicated May 15, 1897
- Medium: Bronze, Granite
- Dimensions: 13 m × 19 m × 23 m (44 ft × 61 ft × 74 ft)
- Location: Eakins Oval; Philadelphia, Pennsylvania, United States; 39°57′51.3″N 75°10′45″W

Philadelphia Register of Historic Places

The Washington Monument in Philadelphia is a large-scale bronze and granite sculpture created by German sculptor Rudolf Siemering in 1897. It features an equestrian statue of George Washington atop a pedestal with allegorical and historical figures. Originally located at the Green Street entrance to Fairmount Park, it was relocated in 1926 to the Eakins Oval in front of the Philadelphia Museum of Art. The memorial was commissioned by the State Society of the Cincinnati of Pennsylvania and given to the city of Philadelphia.

== History ==
The State Society of the Cincinnati of Pennsylvania met on July 4, 1810 and resolved to erect a memorial to George Washington in Philadelphia. As there was no monument by 1824, when the Marquis de Lafayette visited, a second fund was established by citizens of the city for the monument, which would be erected in Washington Square. Local artist John Sartain was part of the monument committee. In 1879, Rudolf Siemering proposed a monumental memorial for Washington. Siemering was a German sculptor working in Berlin and known for his Leipzig Victory Monument located in the city's market square. In 1880, the Society, having secured funding, began negotiations with Siemering. A contract for the monument was signed on October 19, 1881. Sites considered for the monument included Fairmount Park and Washington Square. In 1895, the park commissioners approved the Green Street entrance to the park.

President William McKinley unveiled the statue at its dedication on May 15, 1897 and gave a brief presentation. Judge William W. Porter of the State Society of the Cincinnati gave the main oration. Major William Wayne, president of the society and direct descendant of Revolutionary War general Anthony Wayne, presented the monument to the city. Mayor Charles F. Warwick transferred it to the Fairmount Park Commission.

In 1917, the Benjamin Franklin Parkway was designed by the French landscape architect Jacques Gréber, who had been hired by the Fairmount Park Commission. As part of the City Beautiful plan, the monument was relocated in 1926 from the Green Street entrance to Eakins Oval, the traffic circle at the end of the parkway by the Philadelphia Museum of Art. In time for its centennial in 1997, the monument underwent a four-year restoration. The monument was listed as the Washington Fountain, Eakins Oval, on the Philadelphia Register of Historic Places on June 29, 1971.

== Description ==
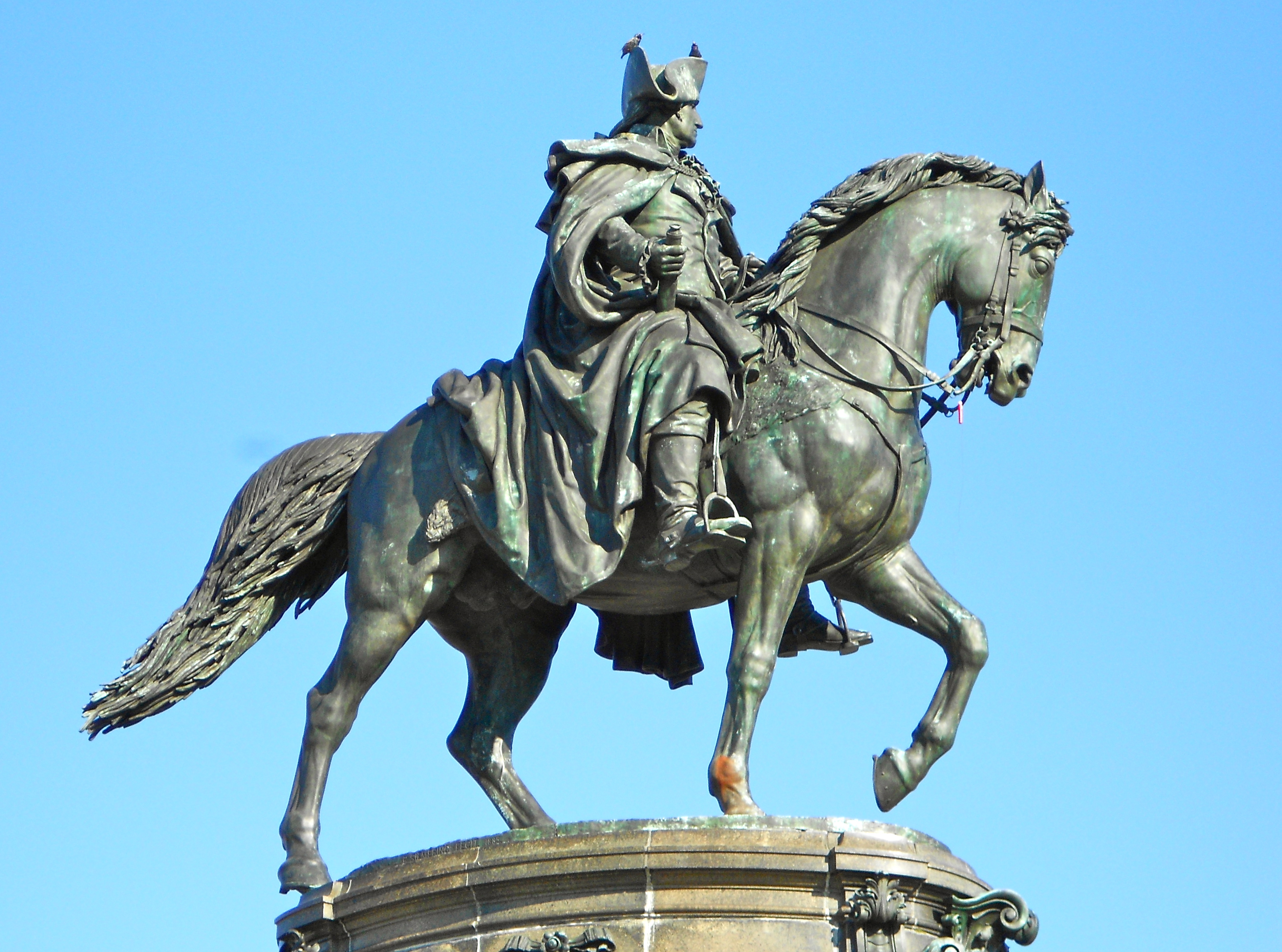
Equestrian statue of George Washington

The 44-foot (13 m) high monument is divided into three levels. The bronze equestrian statue of General Washington is at the top, facing southeast, toward Philadelphia City Hall. He is dressed in a traditional military uniform, representing his service as commander-in-chief of the Continental Army during the American Revolutionary War. He is wearing a cape and tricorner hat, and holding a spyglass in his right hand. Siemering used a copy of a life mask of Washington to model his face.

The middle level, the pedestal, has allegorical and historical figures that represent the country during his time. In the front, an allegorical figure of America, with trident and cornucopia, is accompanied by two citizens, one holding a scroll, the other offering a wreath. An American eagle is below her. On each side of the pedestal is a bronze bas-relief with historical figures, one side depicts the march of the army, the other the westward march of emigrants. Their names are engraved in the reliefs. At the top, beneath the equestrian statue, there is a scroll, "Erected by the State Society of the Cincinnati of Pennsylvania".

The bottom level represents the natural world during Washington's time. The pink Swedish granite base is 61 by 74 feet (19 m × 23 m) and has 13 steps for the 13 original states. The four corner fountains symbolize four major rivers: the Delaware River, the Hudson River, the Mississippi River, and the Potomac River. The Delaware River fountain has two American bison and a man with a bow and arrow, while the Hudson River fountain has two moose and a woman holding a fishing net, the Mississippi River fountain has a bear and a steer with a man holding a trident having killed an alligator, and the Potomac River fountain has two elk and a woman holding a paddle. The four people depicted are Native Americans and are shown in a reclining position behind each fountain. The native animals are guarding the fountains on each side.

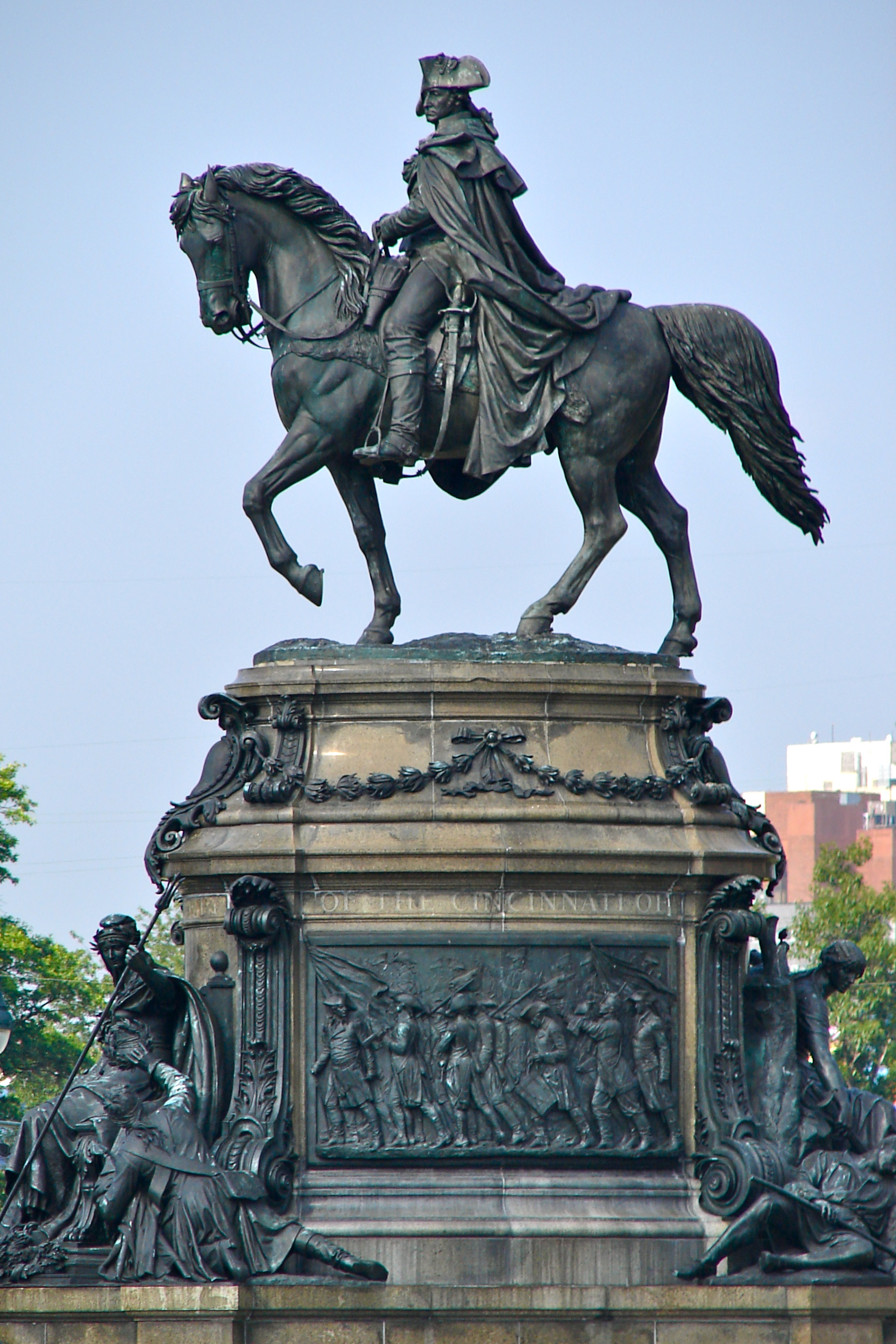
Statue and pedestal

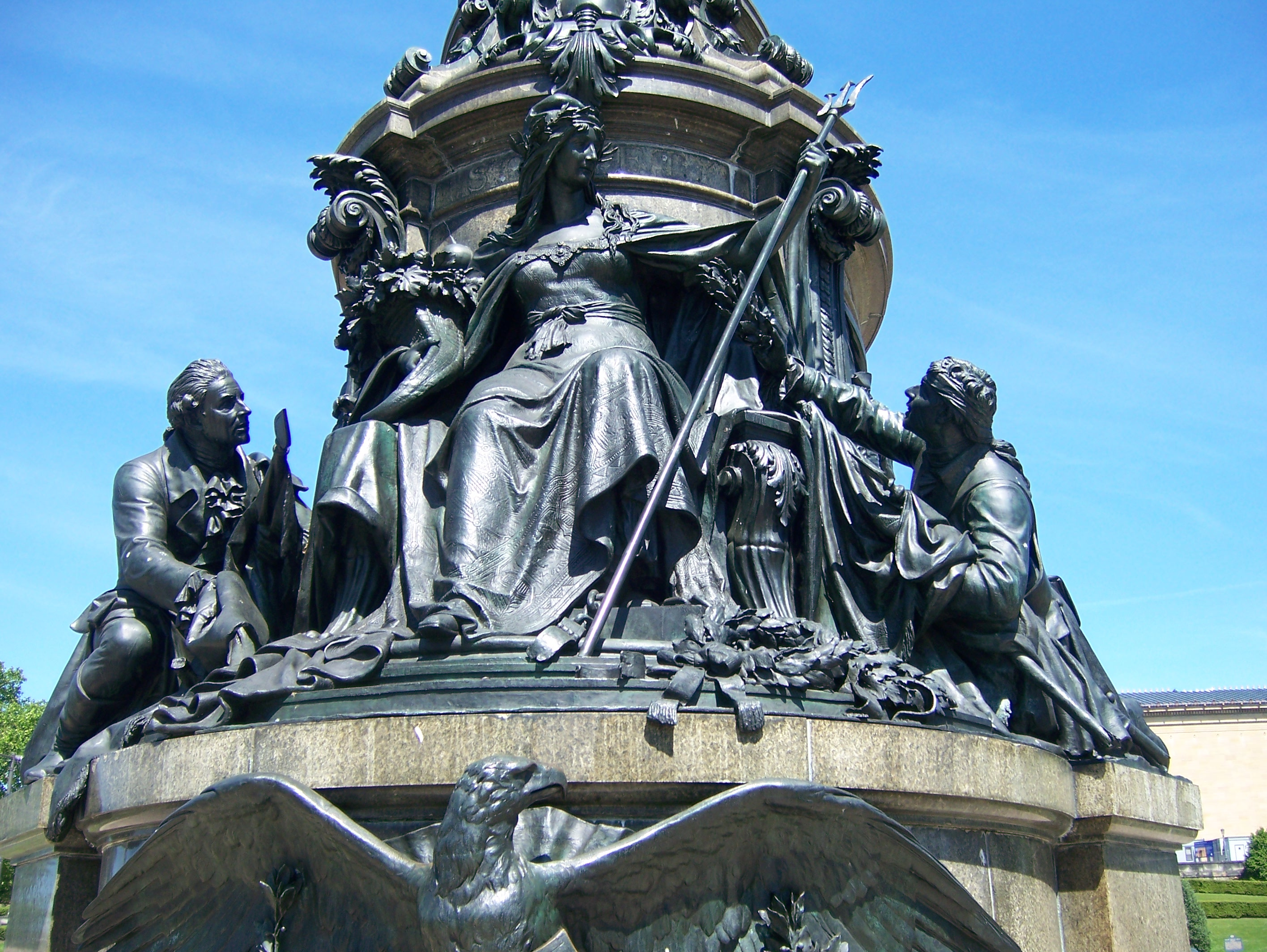
Allegorical figure of America

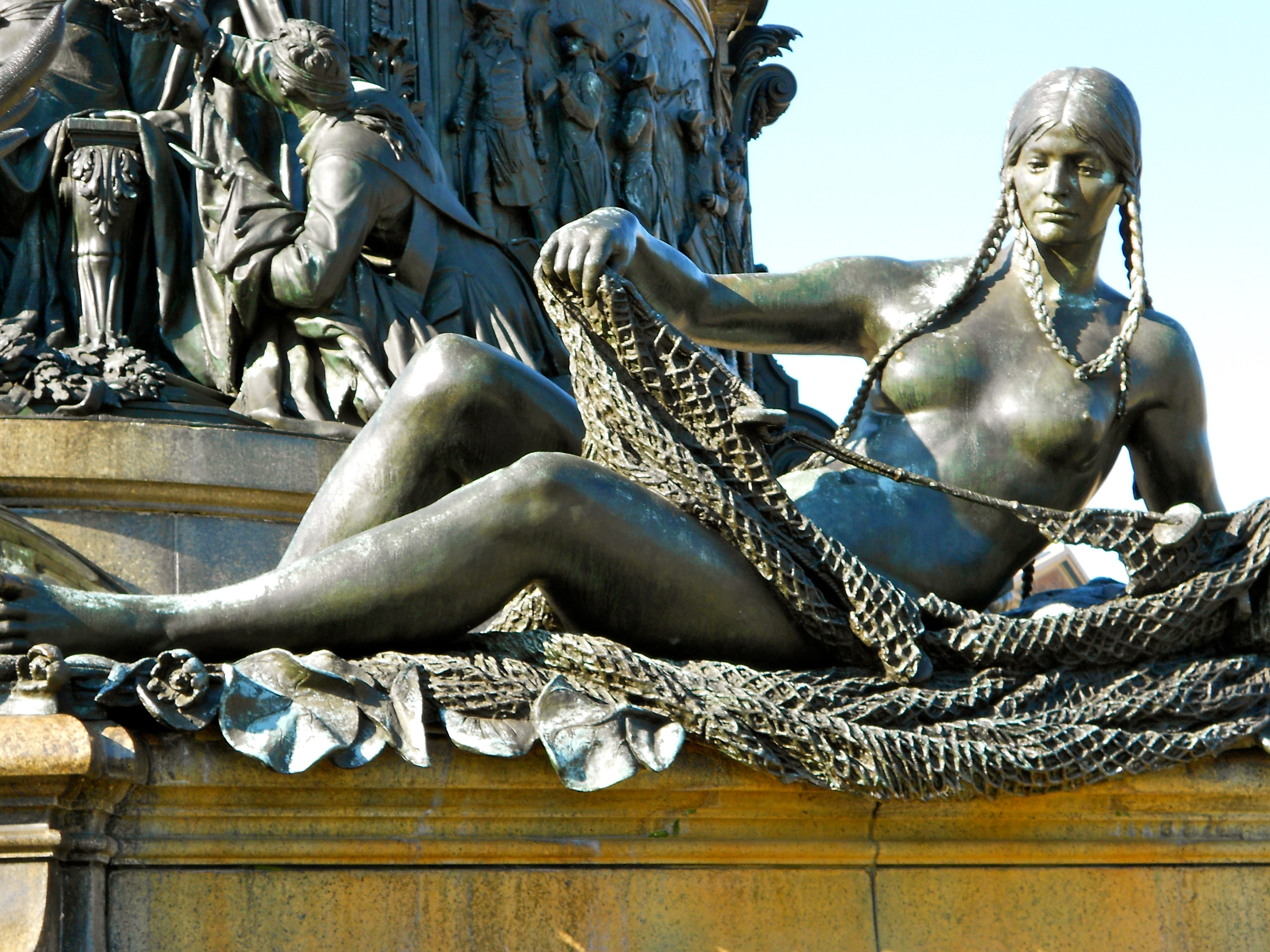
Native American woman with fishing net
Native animals on the base

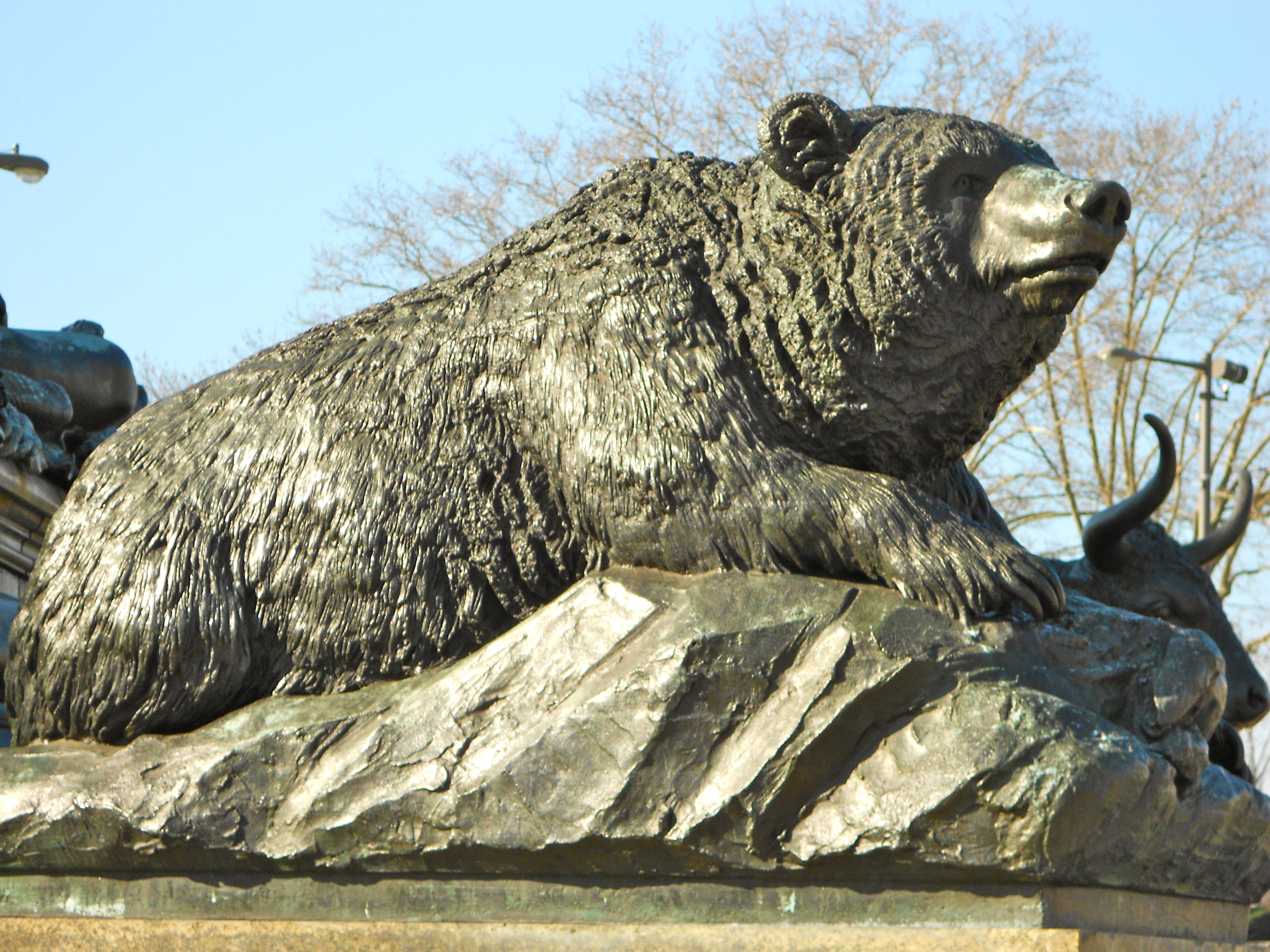
Bear

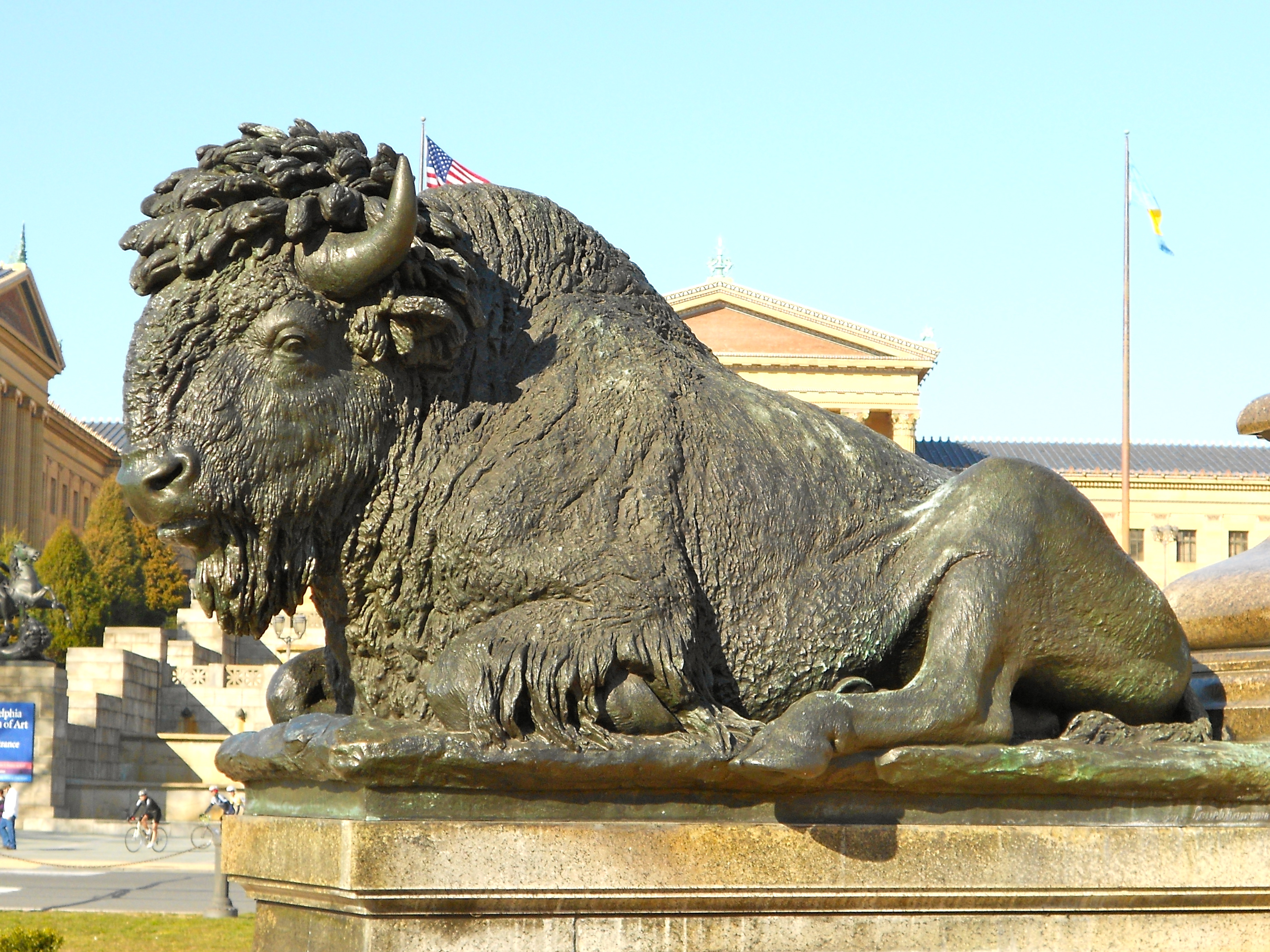
American bison

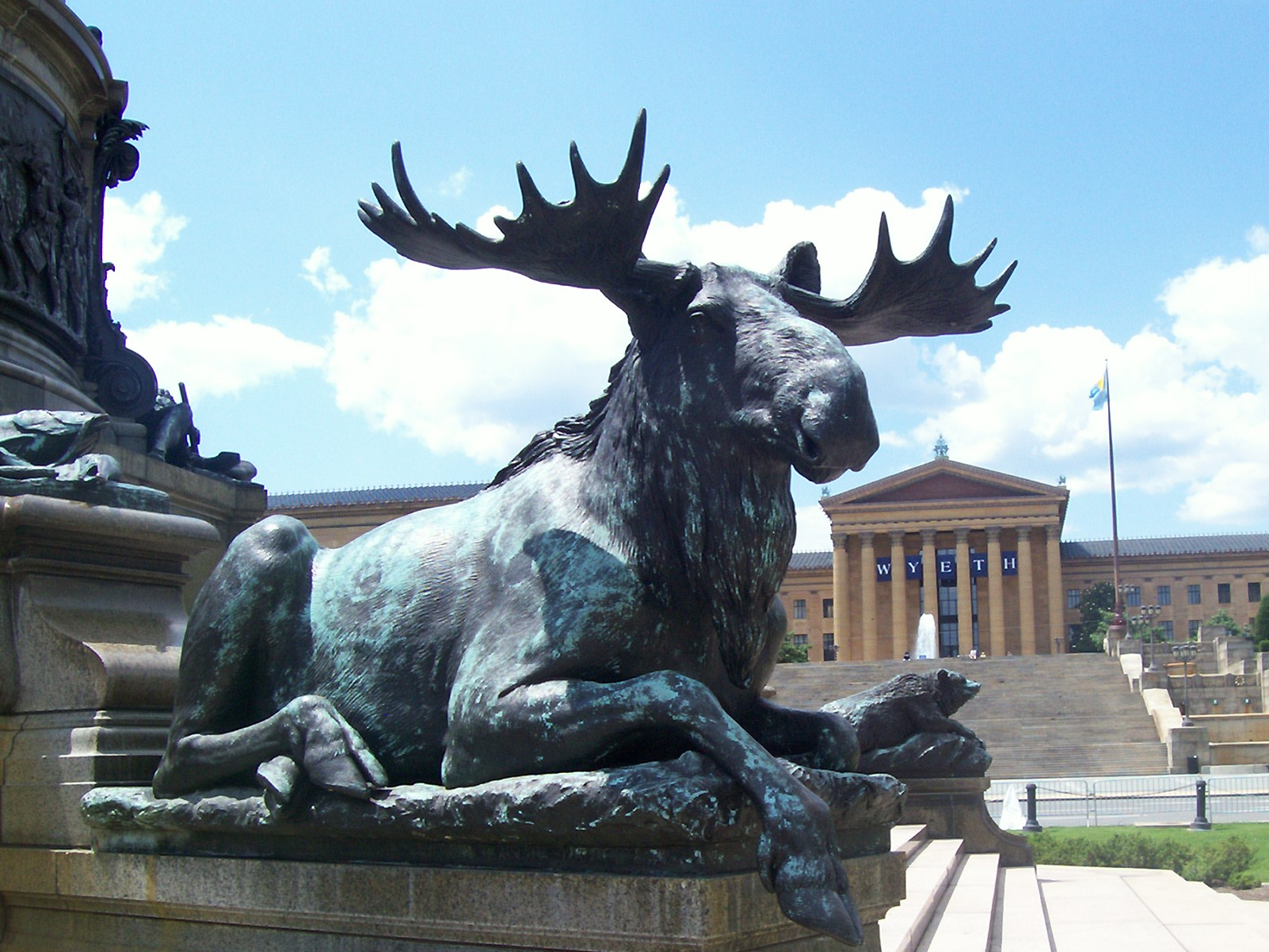
Moose

== See also ==
- 1897 in art
- List of memorials to George Washington
- List of statues of George Washington
- List of equestrian statues in the United States
- List of public art in Philadelphia
- List of the tallest statues in the United States
- Philadelphia Register of Historic Places
