= Rudolf Siemering =

German sculptor

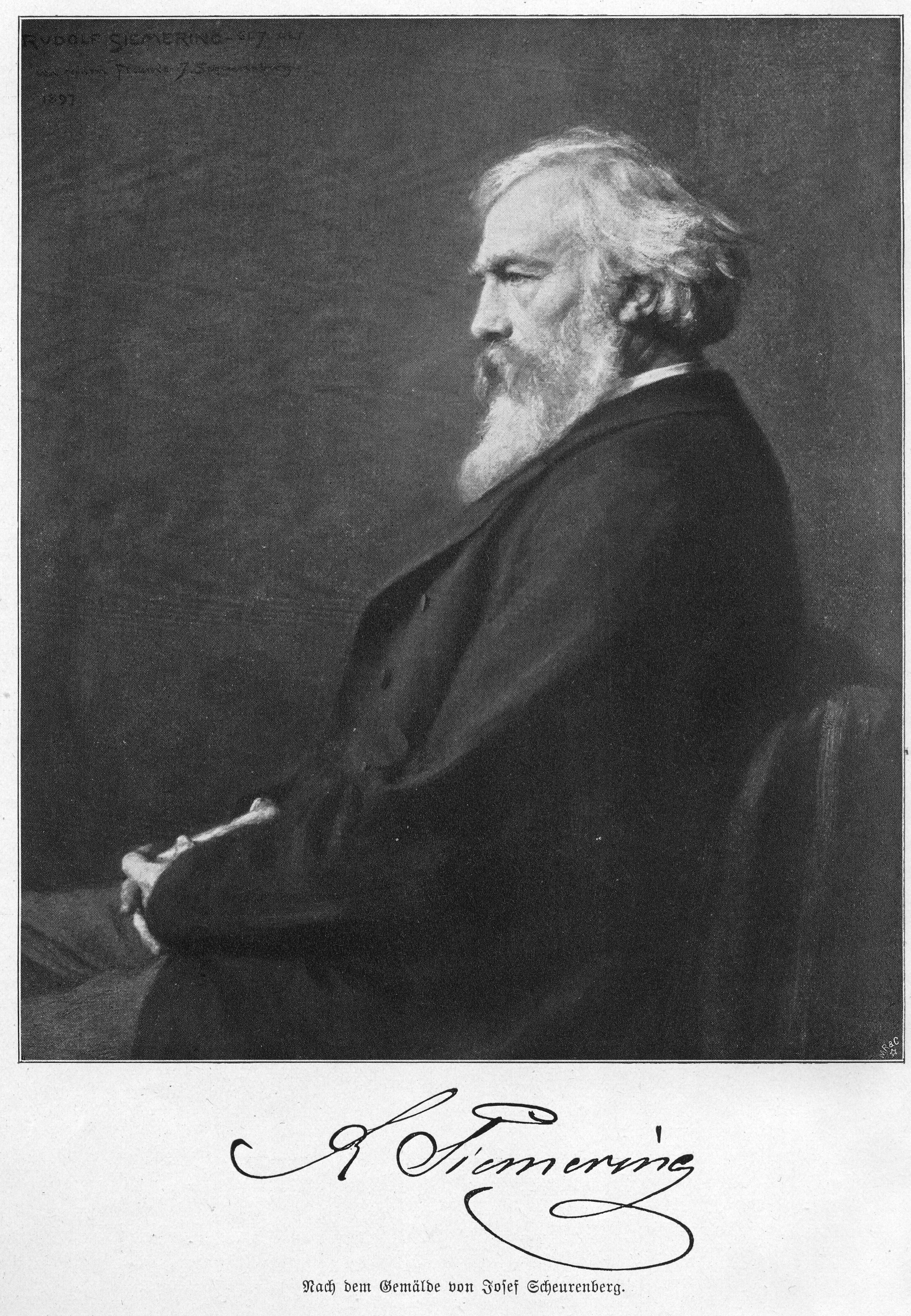

Rudolph Siemering (10 August 1835, Königsberg - 23 January 1905, Berlin) was a German sculptor, known for his works in both Germany and the United States.

== Biography ==
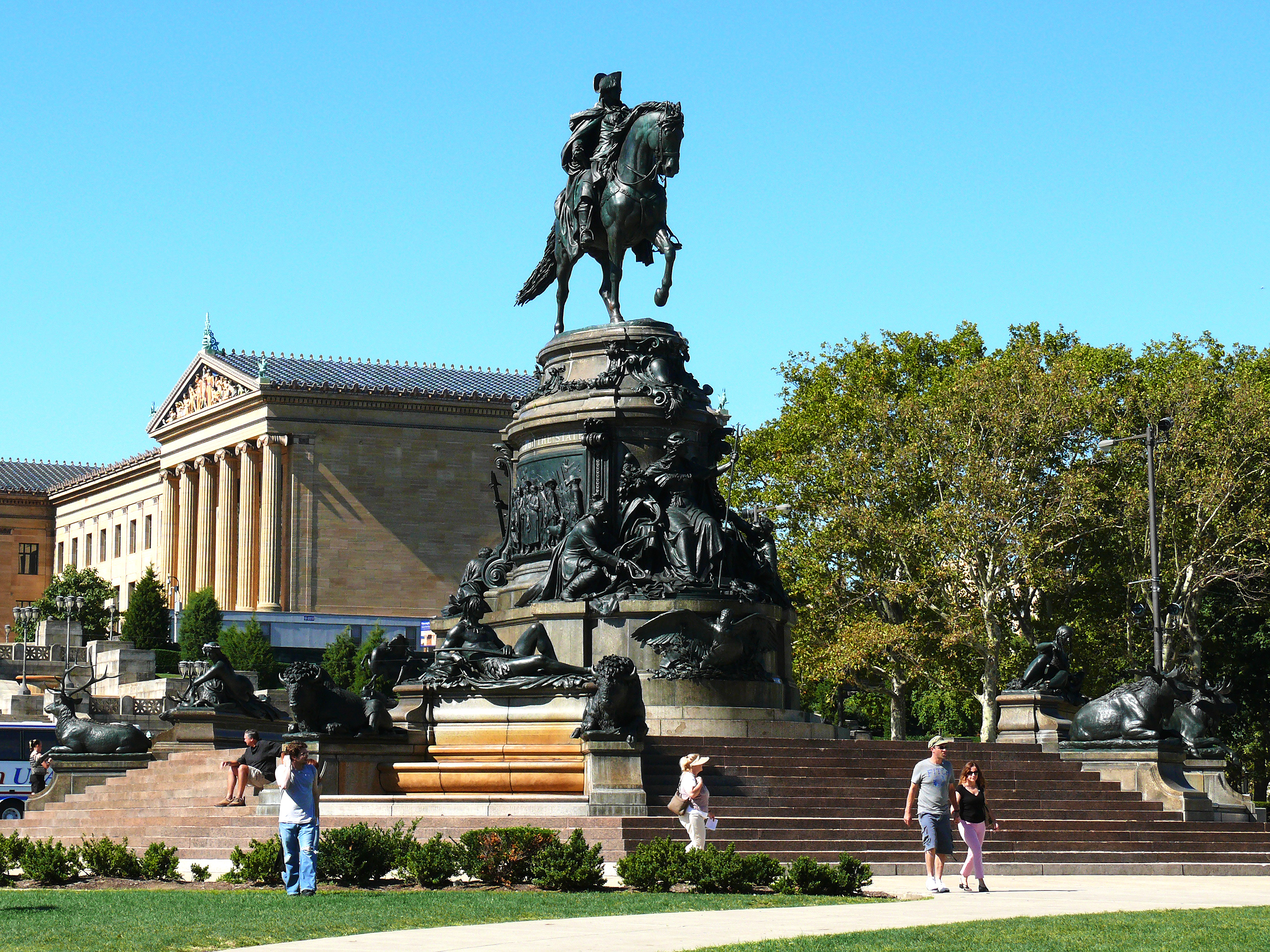
Washington Monument, Eakins Oval, Benjamin Franklin Parkway, Philadelphia

He attended the art academy in Königsberg and then became the pupil of Gustav Bläser in Berlin. For the decoration of Königsberg University, he furnished medallion portraits of its learned men. In 1860 he produced his "Penelope" and in 1860 a sitting figure in marble of King Wilhelm for the Exchange in Berlin; and a terra-cotta statue of Leibnitz for the Academy of Science at Perth, Australia, productions remarkable for realistic modeling and imposing expression. In 1871 he executed the masterly relief "Uprising of the People at the Summons of their King"; and the following year a design for the Goethe monument.

His next work was the statue of Frederick the Great for Marienburg (1877). In 1882, he completed a monument to Albrecht von Graefe, a noted oculist. This was followed by a statue of Martin Luther (1883) at Eisleben. For the market square at Leipzig, he made a war monument: “Germany,” as an armed heroine (1888). Worthy also of special notice was the sitting statue of Emperor William I with the four colossal equestrian figures — King Albert of Saxony, Emperor Frederick, Bismarck, Moltke and eight figures of soldiers. He was the author of the colossal equestrian statue of Washington whose pedestal is enriched with reliefs and accessory sculptures. This impressive monument was unveiled in Fairmount Park, Philadelphia, May 1897 (completed 1883). Siemering's group, "Saint Gertrude Hospitably receiving a Traveling Scholar," was finished and set upon the Bridge of Saint Gertrude (Gertraudenbrücke) at Berlin in 1896. Another notable work is the marble group of "Frederick William I" (1900) in the Sieges-Allée. He was also the author of numerous portrait busts.

== See also ==
- Bison (1902), Tiergarten, Berlin
