= Fabio Borbottoni =

Italian painter (1820–1902)

Fabio Borbottoni (1820–1902) was an Italian painter, mainly of urban vedute of Florence.

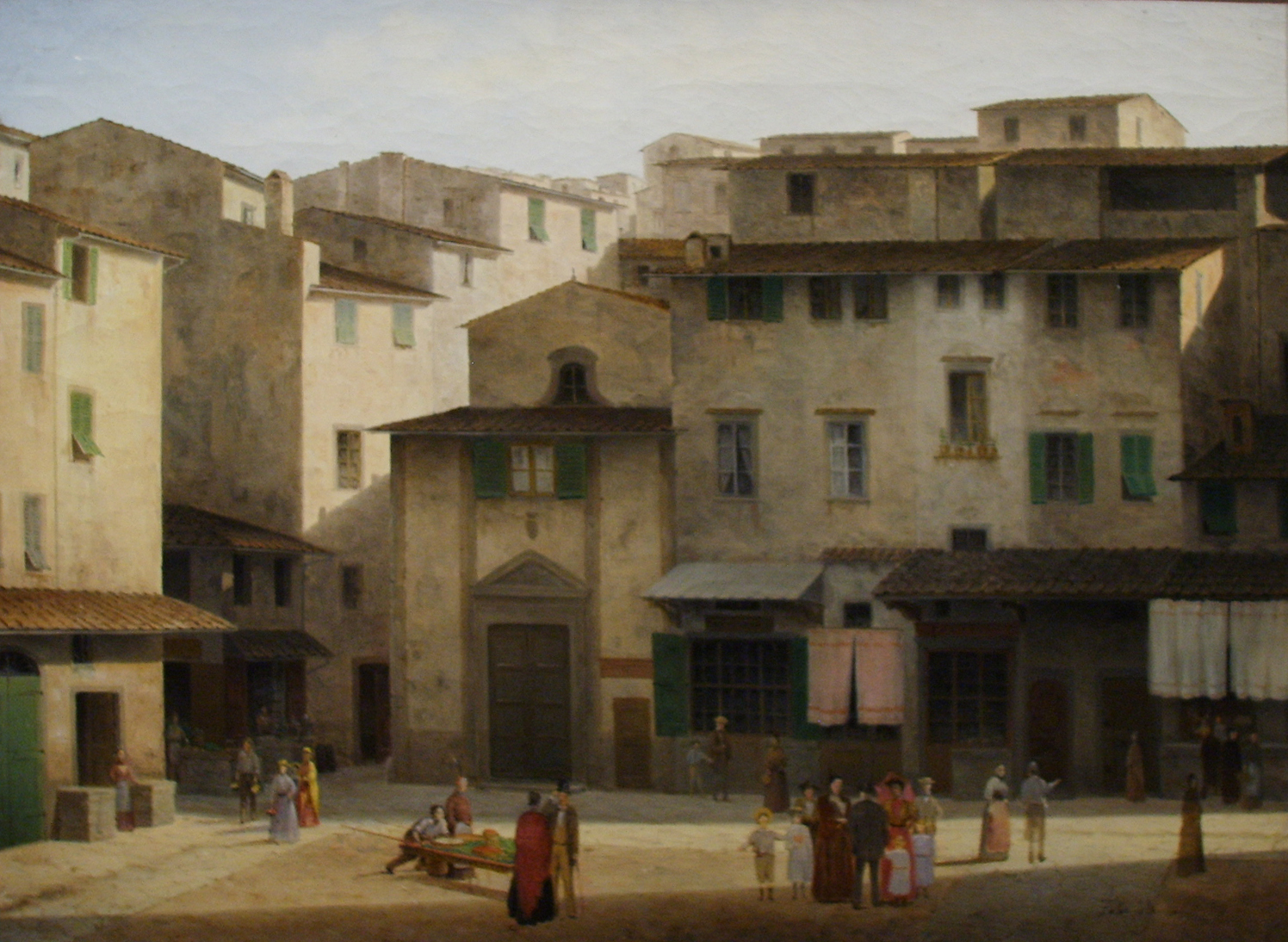
Church of San Tommaso

His specialty was the depiction of churches and city scenes of antique Florence, for example: the Interior of the Duomo, Interior of Santa Croce, Church of the Certosa, Interior of the Santo Spirito. He also had a predilection for painting nostalgic scenes of cityscapes that were altered in the Risanamiento of Florence, such as the Mercato Vecchio. the Ancient Porta a San Giorgio; the Porta a Pinti; Firenze dall'Erta Canina; Belvedere; and San Miniato.

== Gallery ==
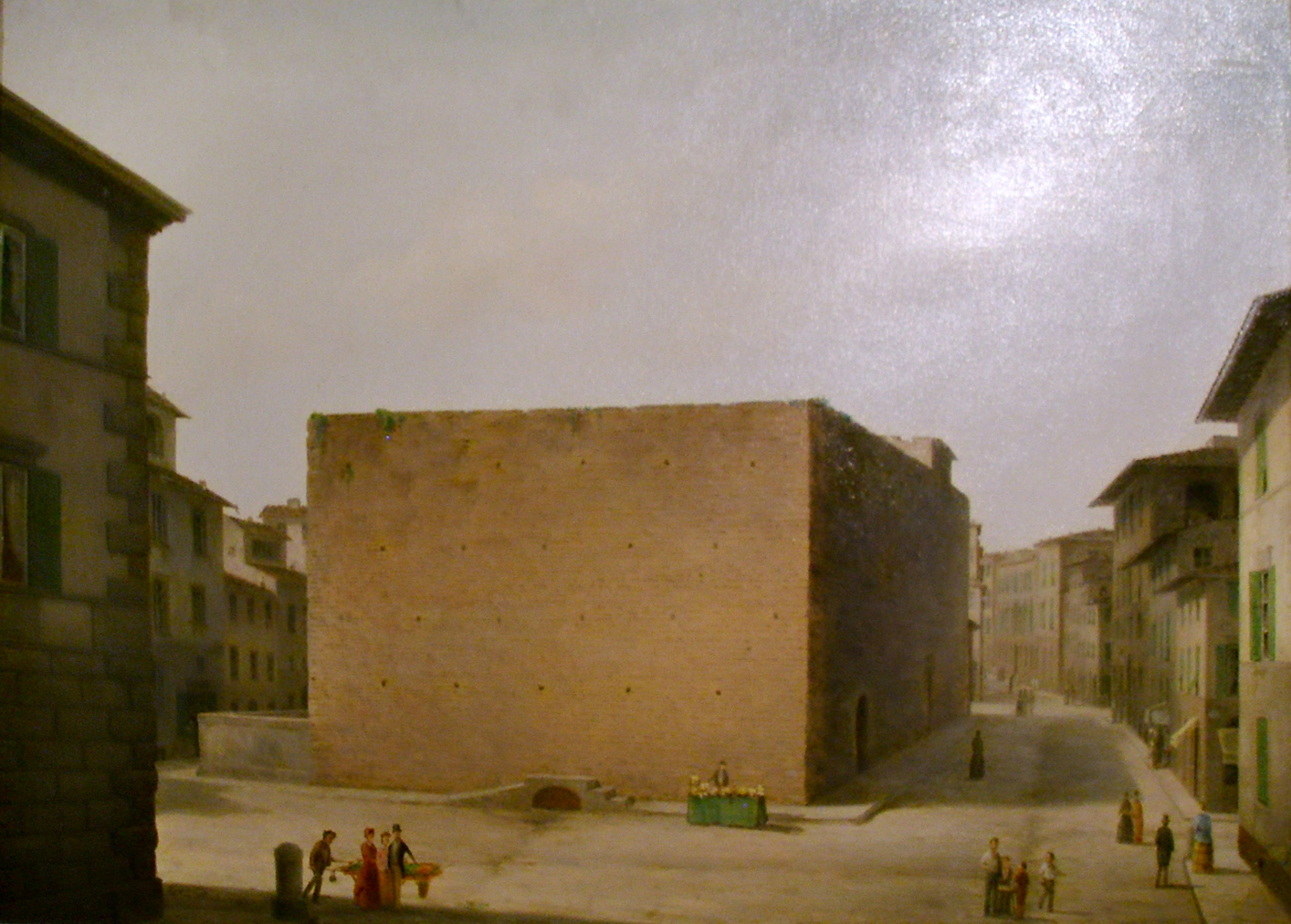
Carcere delle Stinche (jail)

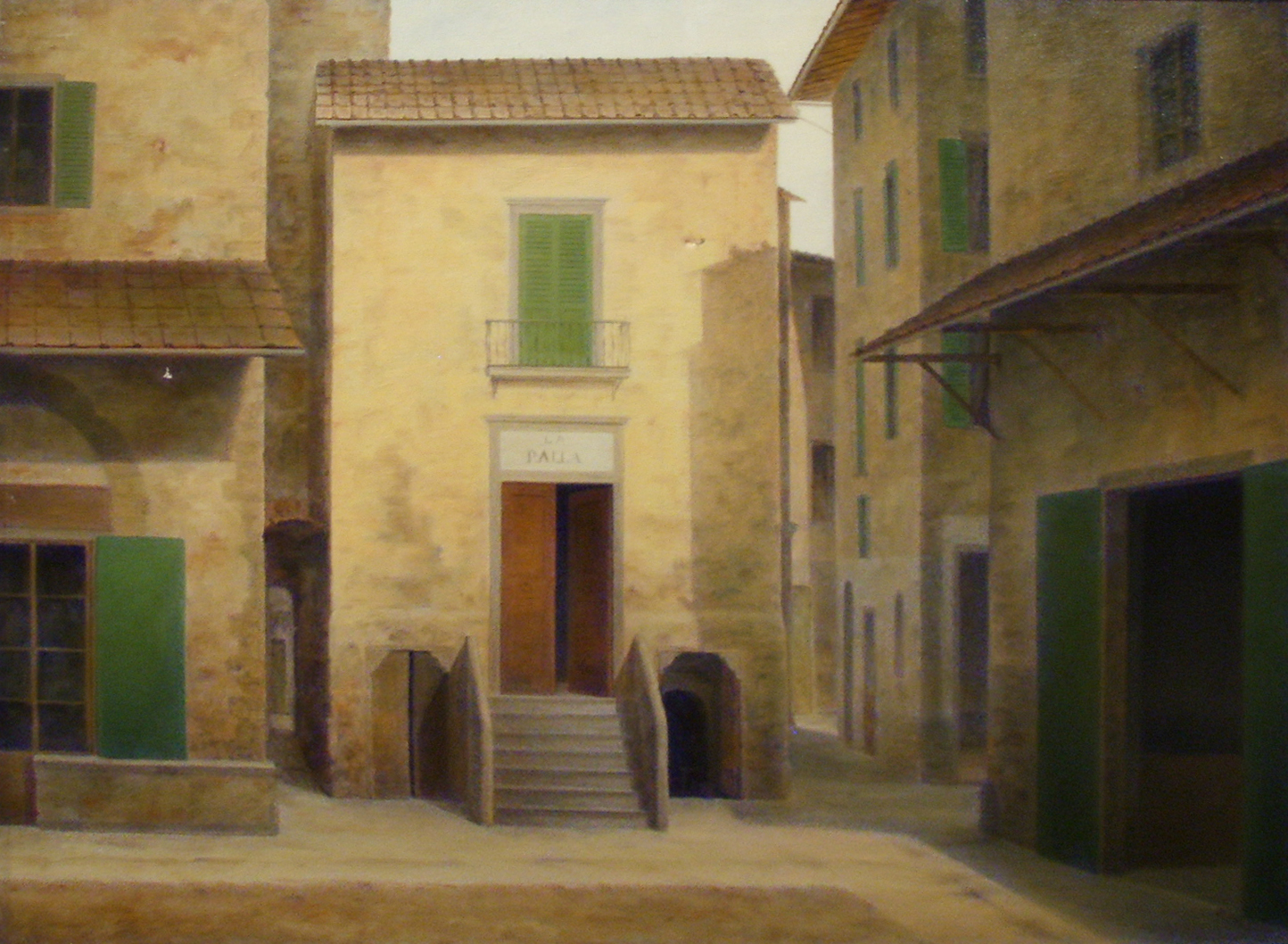
Chiesa della Palla

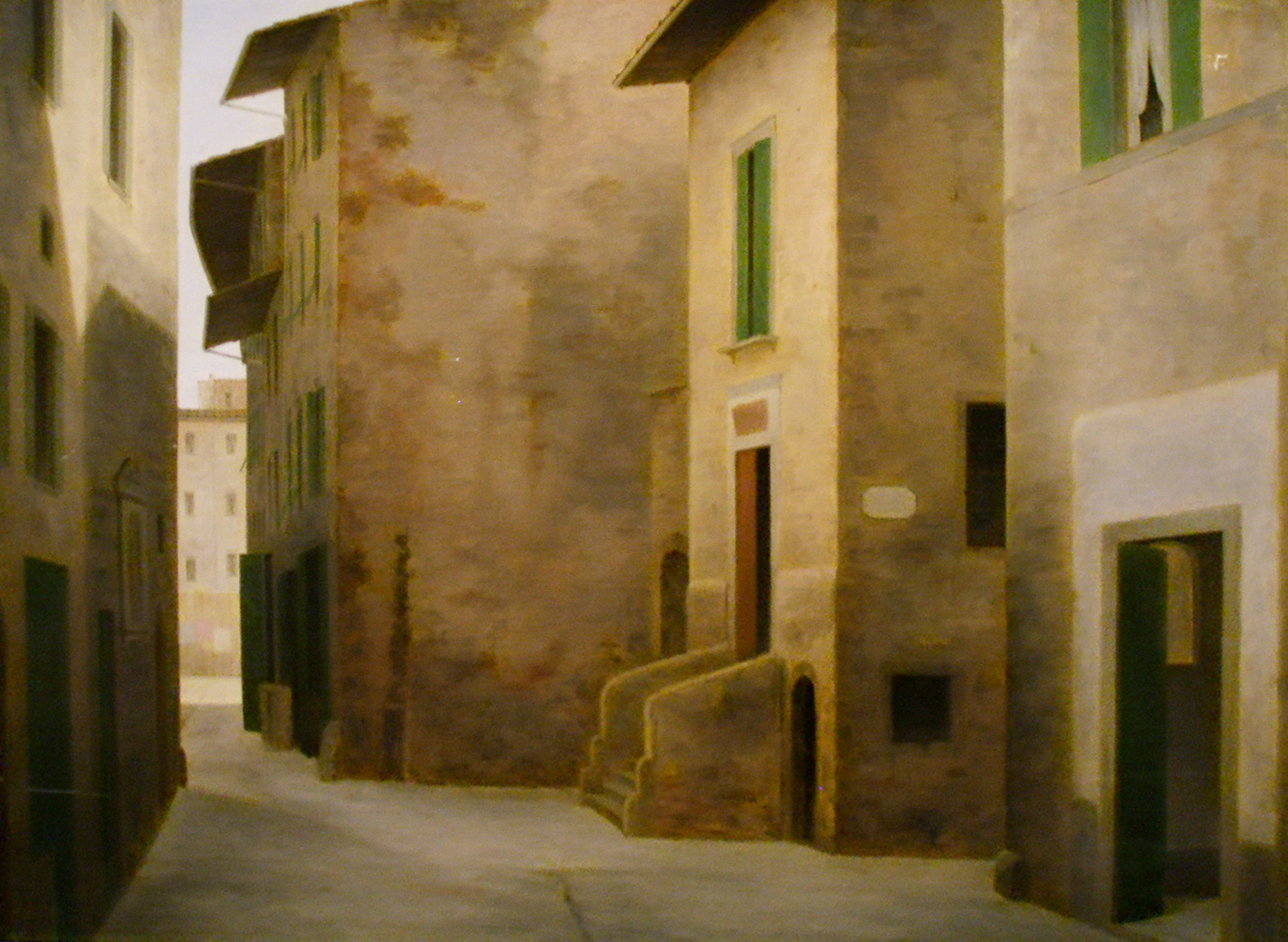
Chiesa della Palla

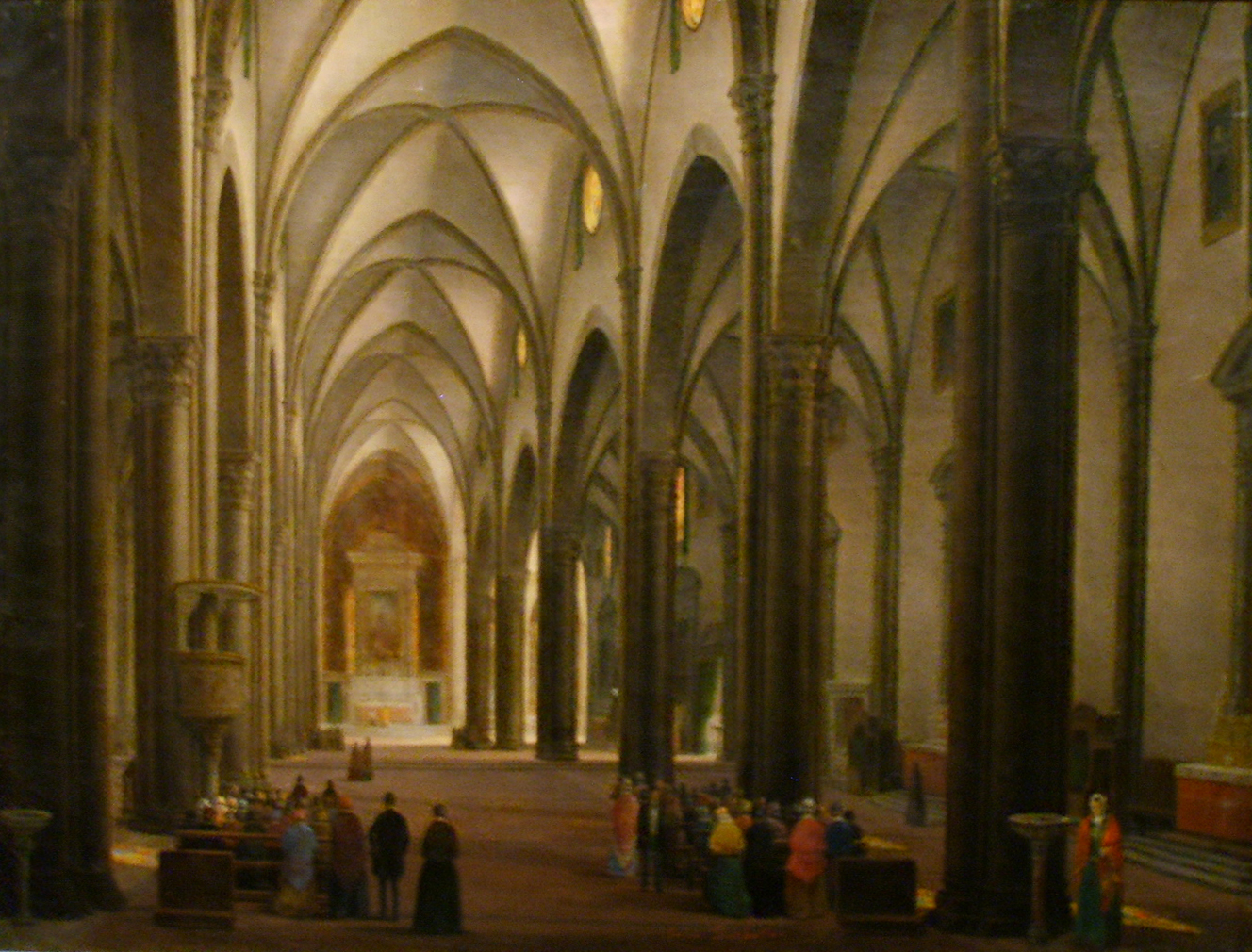
Interior, Santa Maria Novella

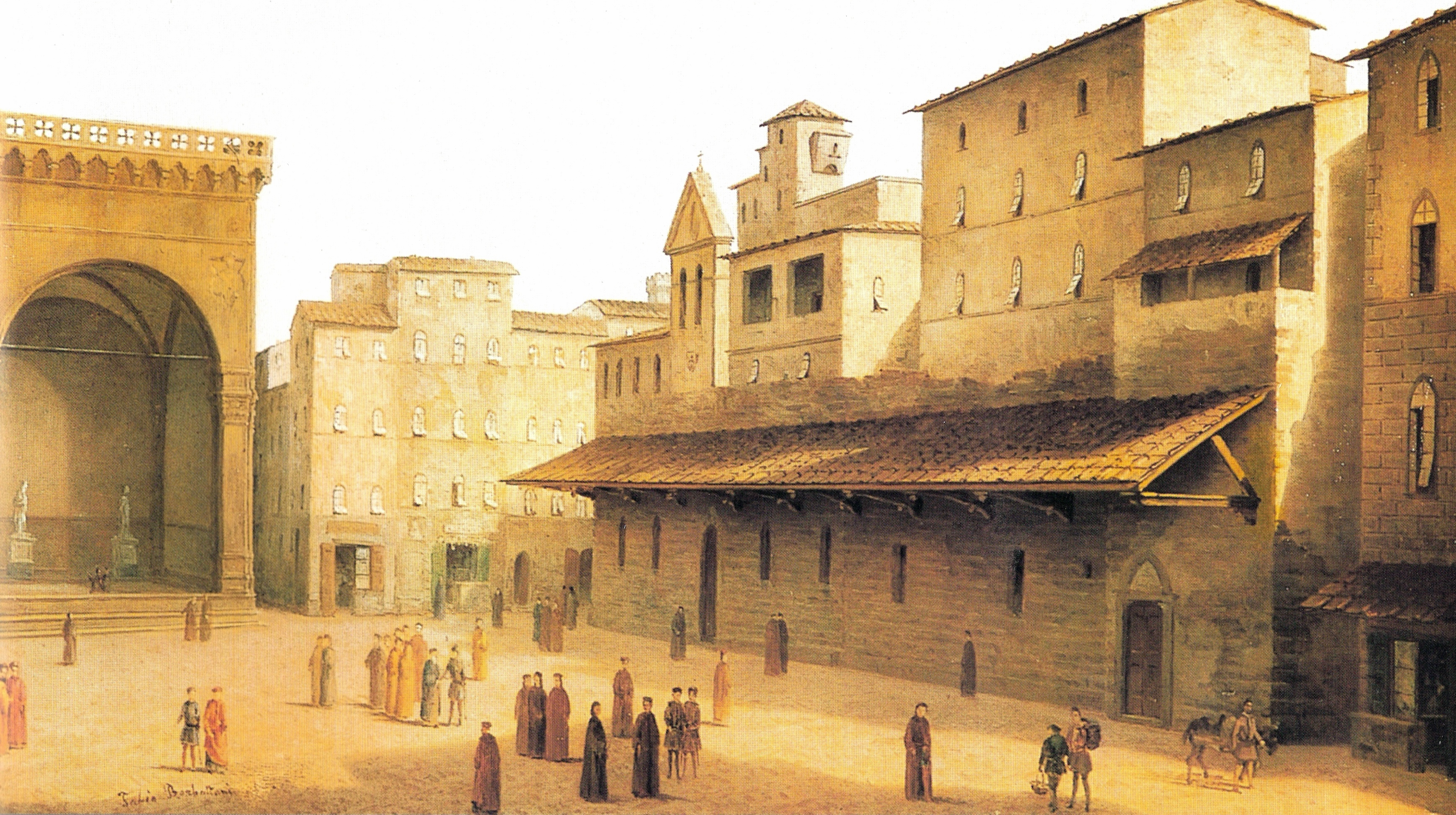
Loggia dei Pisani e Arte del Cambio (Palazzo delle Assicurazioni Generali (Florence))

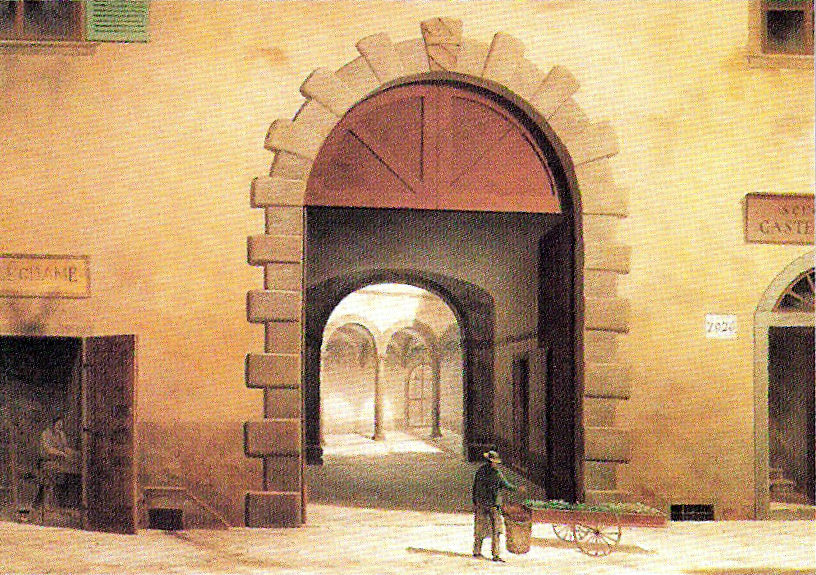
Palazzo Corsini Antinori.

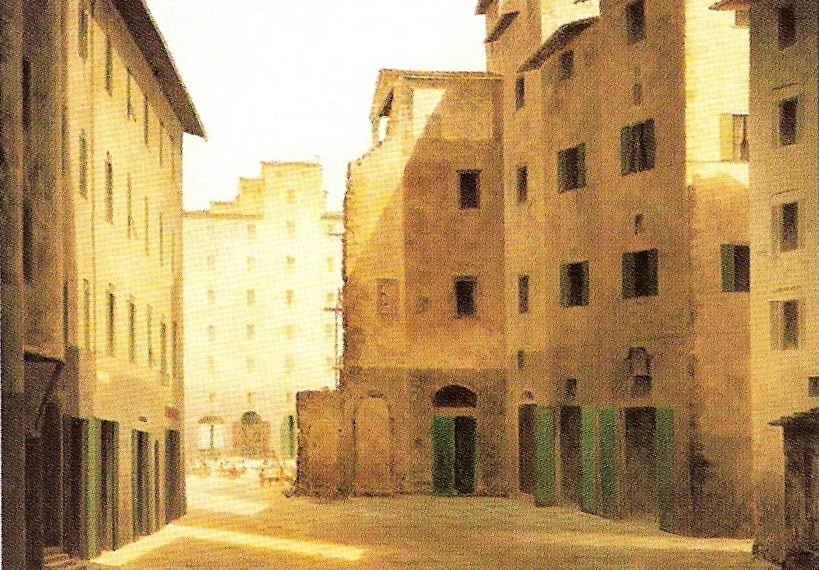
Mercato Vecchio.

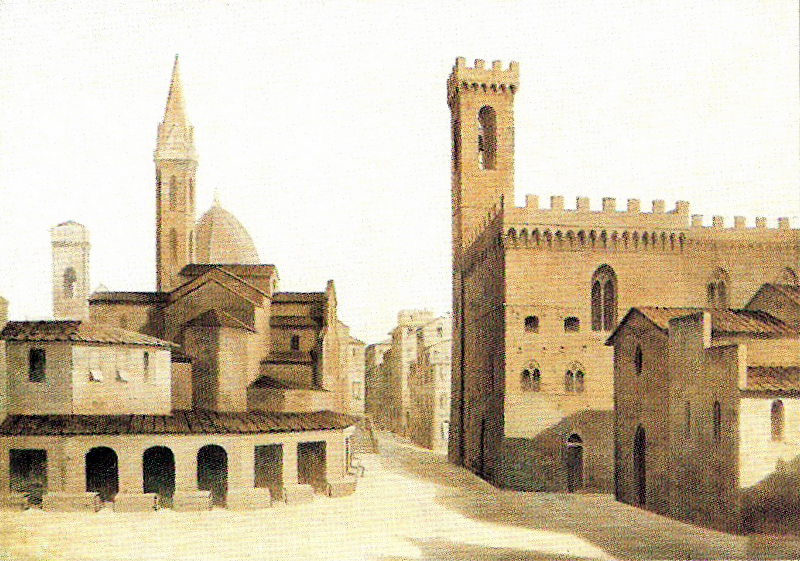
View of Piazza San Firenze
