= August Blue =

Painting by Henry Scott Tuke

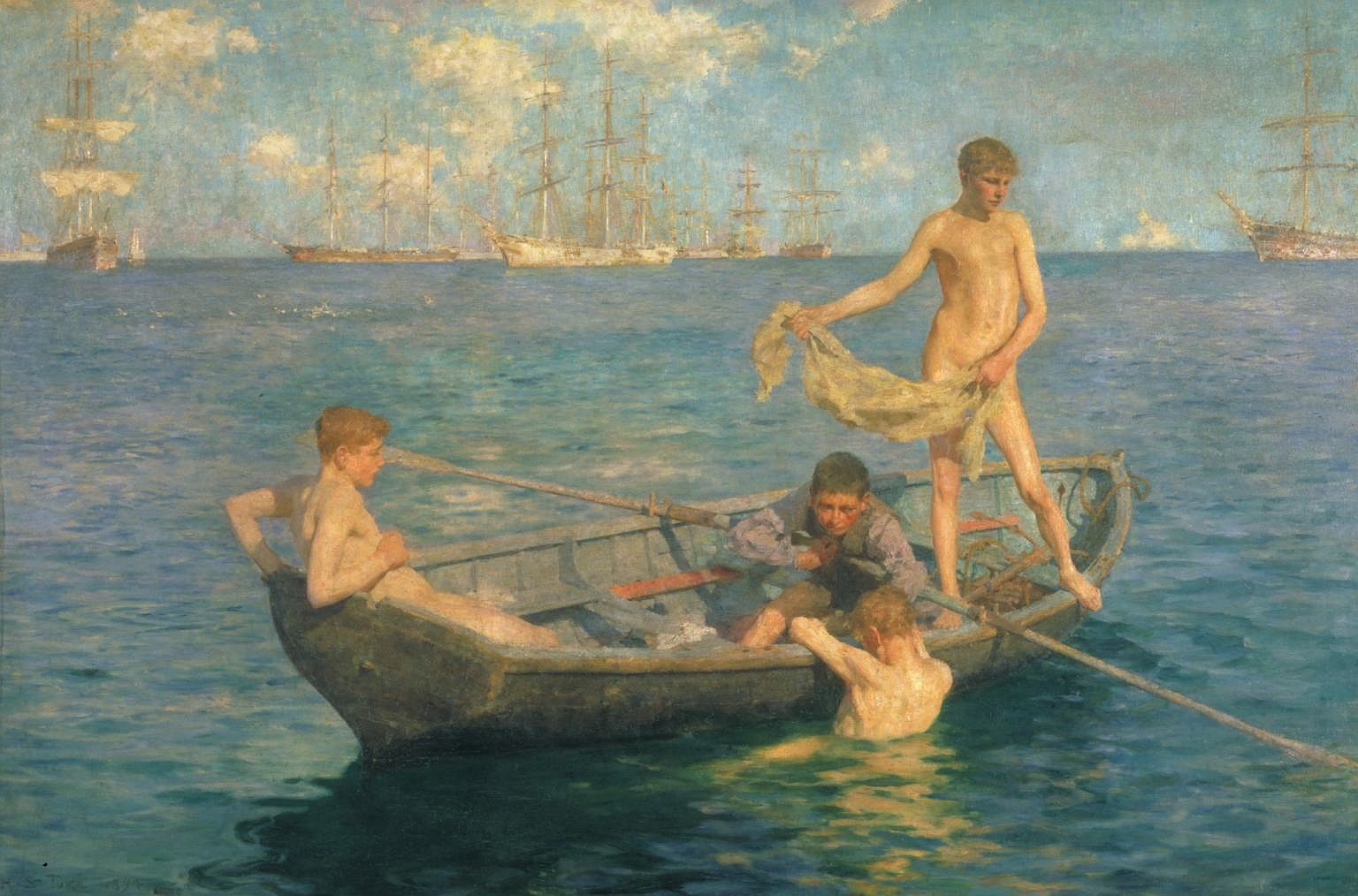
- Artist: Henry Scott Tuke
- Year: 1893-94
- Medium: Oil on canvas
- Dimensions: 121.9 cm × 182.9 cm (47.99 in × 72.01 in)
- Location: Tate

August Blue is an oil-on-canvas painting by English artist Henry Scott Tuke. It depicts four youths in and around a boat, bathing in the sea. Tuke started the painting in 1893, probably en plein air on a boat in the harbour at Falmouth, Cornwall. The finished painting was exhibited at the Royal Academy summer exhibition in 1894, and immediately purchased for the Tate Gallery, where it remains to this day. It has a light Impressionistic style, possibly influenced by his travels to Italy, Corfu and Albania in 1892.

== Background ==
Tuke was born in York in 1858, but his family moved to Falmouth the following year, where it was hoped the milder climate would ameliorate the tuberculosis suffered by his father, the doctor Daniel Hack Tuke. He showed early talent for art, and studied at the Slade School of Art in London in 1874–79 and in Paris from 1881–83, and also travelled to Italy. He returned to Cornwall to live in Falmouth in 1883, and is usually identified as a member of the Newlyn school. Many of his works involve boys or young men, often in or beside the sea, and usually naked, although generally in a position where their genitals are hidden from view.

== Painting ==
The painting depicts four young men bathing in Falmouth harbour: one in the sea holding on to the side of a rowing boat, one standing up in the boat holding a cloth or towel, and two sitting in the boat, one leaning back at the stern sunbathing, and one leaning forward by the oars. The first three are apparently naked, while the fourth wears a blue shirt and brown waistcoat. The dominant colour, reflected in the title, is blue: the sky is blue above, with a golden sunlight creating glowing colours; there are clear blue waters below, with a greenish shadow of the boat. Boats with their square-rigged sails furled ride at anchor in the background.

The careful composition shows the youths' healthy bodies in a fresh and modern style, which may be contrasted with the lifeless classical models depicted in contemporary academy paintings, and Tuke's earlier work. The painting is ambiguous, and can be read in several ways: as a celebration of athletic masculinity; or as a representation of the innocence and purity of youth, unselfconscious in a natural setting, reminiscent of a lost rural idyll; but many discern a homoerotic charge.

The painting measures 122 centimetres (48 in) by 183 centimetres (72 in). A discoloured varnish was removed in 2000, but the painting shows grey stains to the lower left and upper right corners, perhaps indicating mould in the underlying paint structure.

The title is taken from the last verse of "The Sundew", a poem by Algernon Swinburne published in 1866, describing a lovers' tryst in marshland, witnessed by a sundew, which ends "Thou wert not worth green midsummer // Nor fit to live to August blue, // O Sundew, not remembering her." Tuke's paintings of naked boys bathing inspired several works by Uranian poets in the late 19th and early 20th centuries, including "The Dawn Nocturne (August Blue)" by Alan Stanley (1894), and the earlier poems "Sonnet on a Picture by Tuke" by Charles Kains Jackson (1889) and "Ballade of Boys Bathing" (1890) by Frederick Rolfe, the self-proclaimed "Baron Corvo".

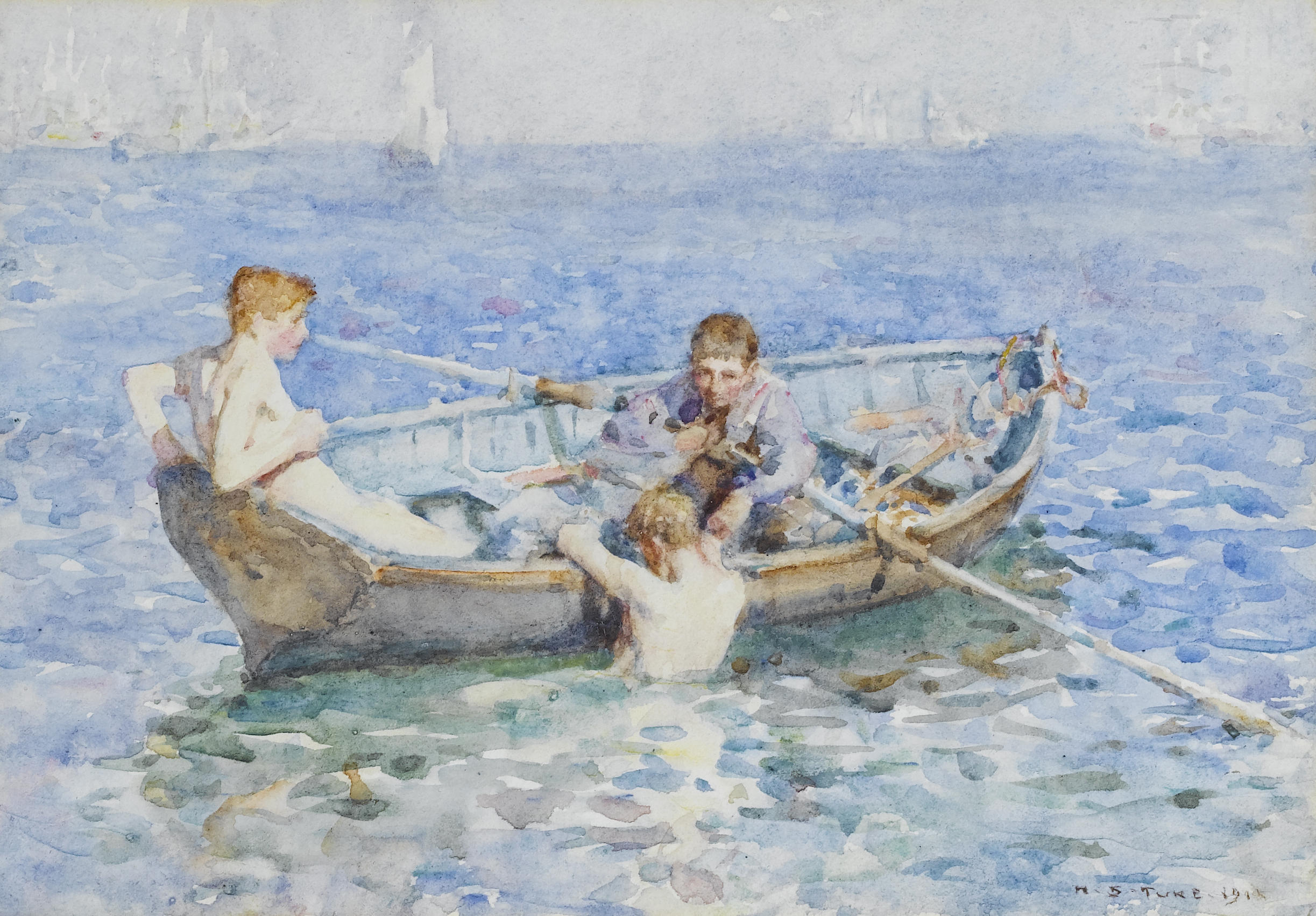
Study for August Blue

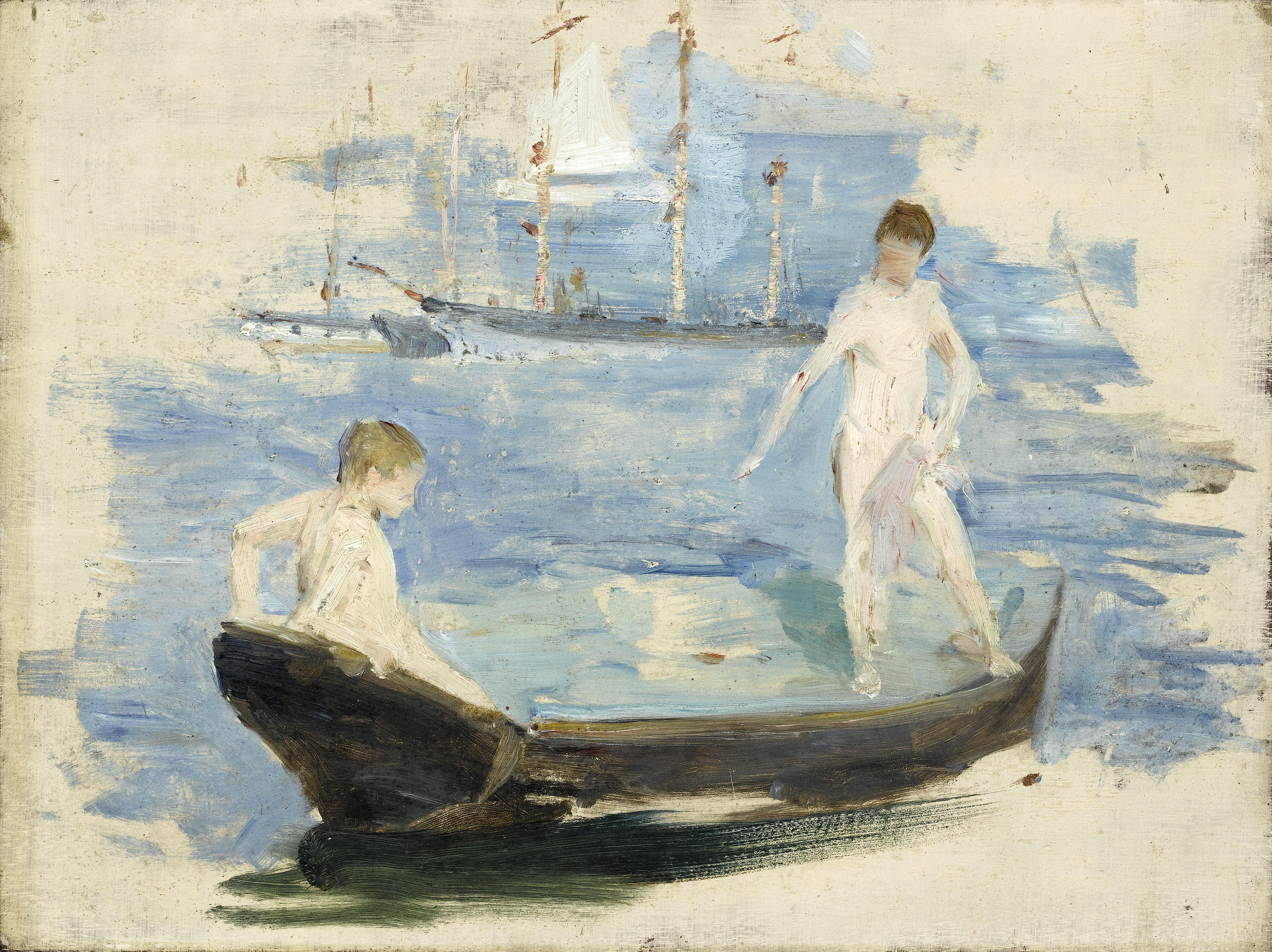
Preliminary Sketch for August Blue

== Reception ==
The painting was a critical success when it was exhibited at the Royal Academy summer exhibition in 1894, although some critics complained that its informal Impressionistic style made it closer to a sketch than a finished work. It was bought from the artist by the Tate Gallery the same year for 500 guineas (or £525), using funds from the Chantrey Bequest Fund, established from the estate of sculptor Francis Chantrey and charged with encouraging British art by buying paintings and sculpture of the "highest merit" executed entirely within Great Britain. It was the second of Tuke's works to be purchased by Chantrey Bequest Fund for the Tate, following All Hands to the Pumps in 1889, an uncommon compliment to the artist.

It was followed by many other works by Tuke on similar themes, including Ruby, Gold and Malachite, exhibited at the RA in 1902. Pictures of naked youths outside of a classical context were not generally acceptable in this period, with a notable exception for depictions of bathing: another prominent example is Thomas Eakins' The Swimming Hole (1884–85). Tuke was elected an Associate of the Royal Academy in 1900 and a full member of the Royal Academy of Arts in 1914. His work remained popular until the First World War ended the gilded age of late Victorian and Edwardian England.

It is difficult to identify Tuke's models, due to his habit of interchanging heads and bodies in his paintings, but one was Maurice Clift, a nephew of a family friend, who was killed in France in the First World War. Another was the artist Lindsay Symington, who modelled for the boy holding onto the boat in the water.

Tuke's work fell out of favour after the war, and Tuke died in 1929. His work regained popularity after it was discovered by a generation of openly gay art enthusiasts in the 1970s.

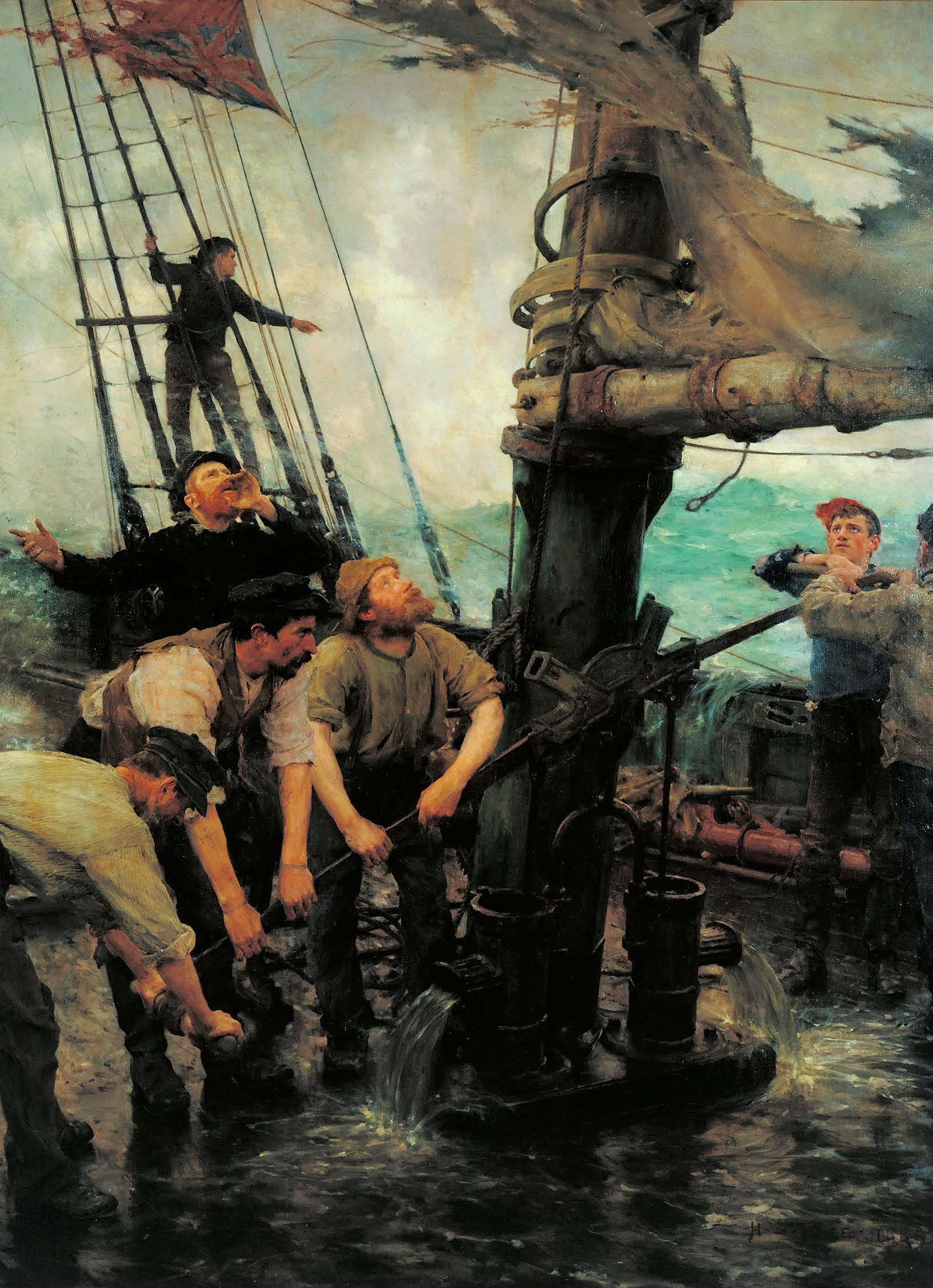
Henry Scott Tuke, All Hands to the Pumps, 1889, Tate Gallery.

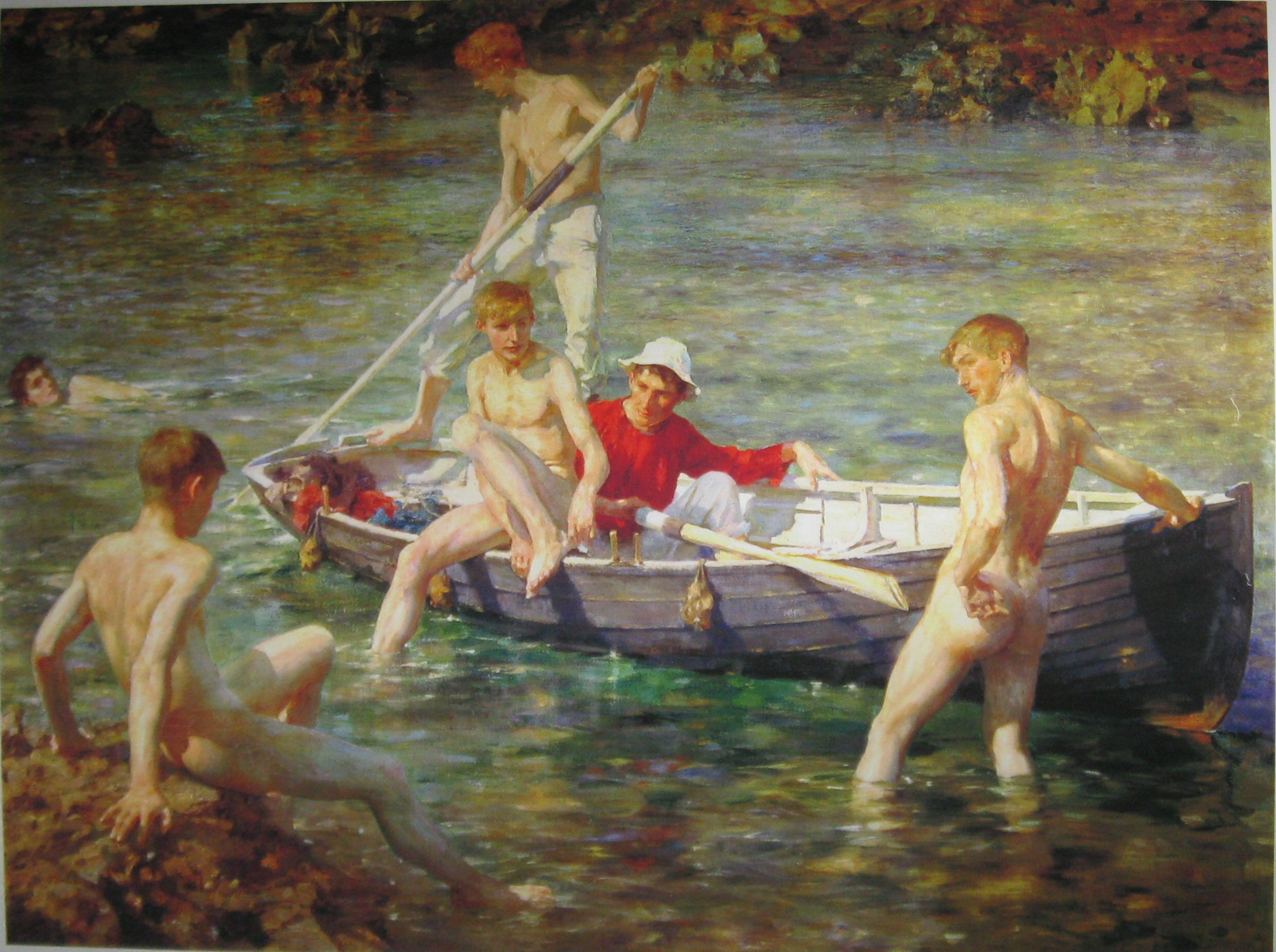
Henry Scott Tuke, Ruby, Gold and Malachite, 1902, Guildhall Art Gallery.
