= Ruby, Gold and Malachite =

Painting by Henry Scott Tuke

Ruby, Gold, and Malachite
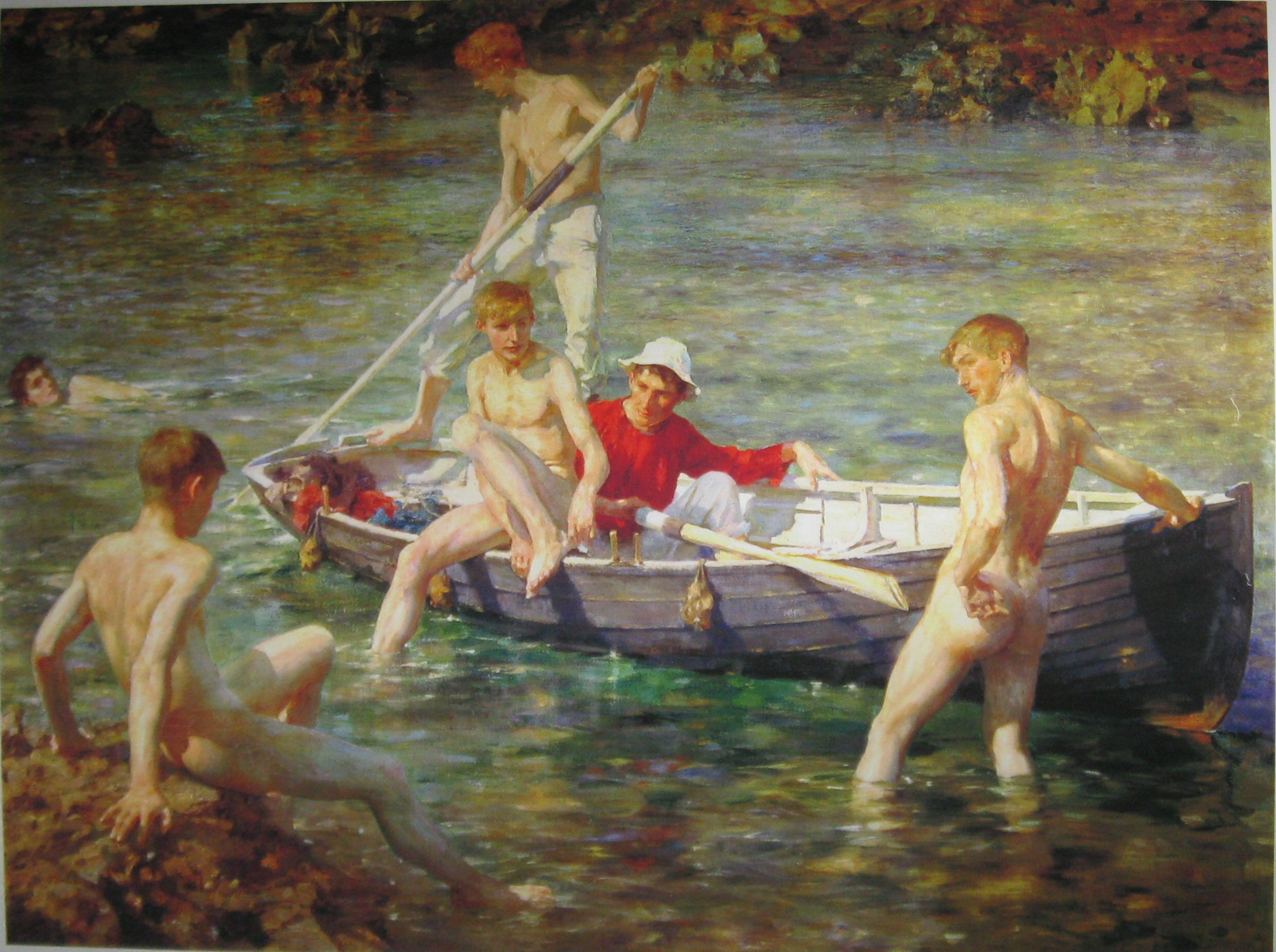
- Artist: Henry Scott Tuke
- Year: 1902
- Medium: Oil on canvas
- Dimensions: 117 cm × 159 cm (46 in × 64 in)
- Location: Guildhall Art Gallery, London

Ruby, Gold and Malachite is an oil-on-canvas painting by Henry Scott Tuke. It depicts six young men in and around a boat, bathing in the sea. It was painted near Falmouth and exhibited at the Royal Academy Exhibition of 1902, along with two other works by Tuke, The Run Home and Portrait of Alfred de Pass. It was one of his greatest successes.

The painting measures 117 centimetres (46 in) by 159 centimetres (63 in). It was acquired by the City of London Corporation and is displayed at the Guildhall Art Gallery.

== Background ==
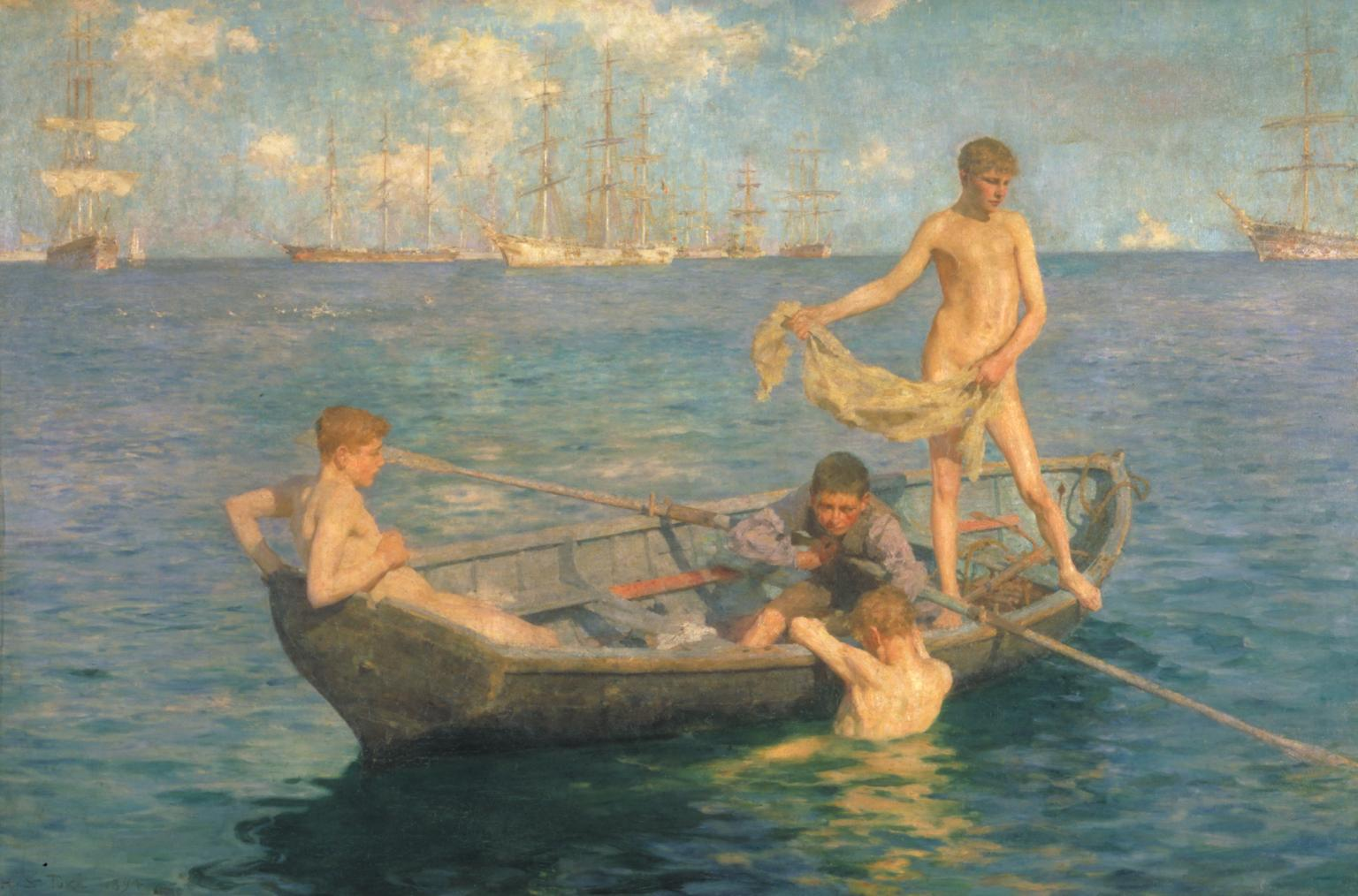
Henry Scott Tuke, August Blue (1893–94; Tate Britain, London).

Tuke was born in York in 1858, but his family moved to Falmouth the following year, where it was hoped the milder climate would ameliorate the tuberculosis suffered by his father, the physician Daniel Hack Tuke. He showed early talent for art, and studied at the Slade School of Art in London in 1874–79 and Paris from 1881–83, and also travelled to Italy. He returned to Cornwall to live in Falmouth in 1883, and is usually identified as a member of the Newlyn school. Many of his works involve boys or young men, often in or beside the sea, and usually naked, although generally in a position where their genitals are hidden from view.

== Painting ==
The painting depicts six young men at Newporth Beach near Falmouth on a summer's day, in and about a rowing boat on the sea by the shoreline. The painting shows no horizon, making the open-air space more enclosed and intimate. Four of the subjects are naked: one swimming to the upper left, one resting on rocks to the lower left, one wading and holding the boat to the lower right, and one sitting on the side of the boat in the centre. The two others are clothed: one standing in white trousers holding an oar at the rear of the boat, and one sitting in the boat with white hat and trousers and an eye-catching red top.

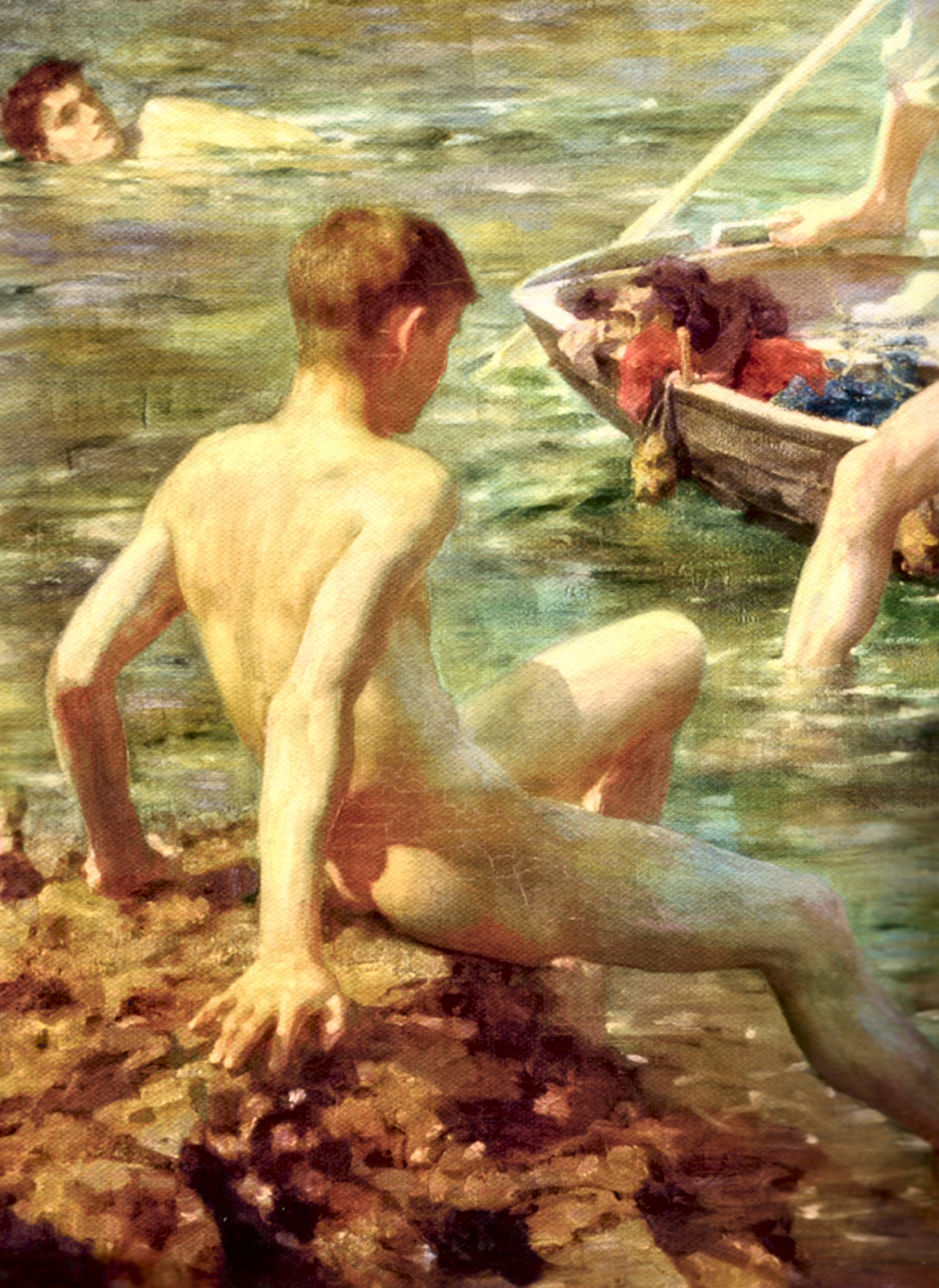
A detail from Ruby, Gold and Malachite, with Charlie Mitchell as model.

The painting is ambiguous, and can be read in several ways: as a celebration of athletic masculinity; a representation of the innocence and purity of youth, unselfconscious in a natural setting; an image of a lost rural idyll; a depiction of the sons of empire; or (in the aftermath of the Boer War) as a celebration of pleasure and an implicit criticism of the militarisation of youth. Many commentators note Tuke's acquaintance with the Uranian movement and discern a homoerotic charge.

The title Ruby, Gold and Malachite – referring to the red, yellow and green tones used in the work – echoes an essay by John Addington Symonds, and may refer back to the opening lines of a poem "The Sundew" published by Algernon Swinburne in 1866: "A little marsh-plant, yellow-green, // And pricked at lip with tender red". The poem describes a lovers' tryst in marshland, witnessed by a sundew. Swinburne's poem was the inspiration for Tuke's 1894 work, August Blue, the title of Tuke's painting being a quotation from the closing lines of the poem.

Tuke used several of his regular models for the work, including the brothers Richard and Georgie Fouracre, Bert White, Harry Cleave, and Charlie Mitchell (1885–1957, shown resting on the rocks in the lower left) who was Tuke's boatman for 30 years. Tuke left Mitchell £1,000 in his will.

== Reception ==
Pictures of naked youths outside of a classical context were not generally acceptable in this period, with a notable exception for depictions of bathing: another prominent example is Thomas Eakins' The Swimming Hole (1883–5). Tuke was elected an Associate of the Royal Academy in 1900 and a full member of the Royal Academy of Arts in 1914. His work remained popular until the First World War ended the gilded age of late Victorian and Edwardian England. Tuke's work fell out of favour after the war, and Tuke died in 1929. His work regained popularity after it was discovered by a generation of openly gay art enthusiasts in the 1970s.
