= Gleaming waters =

Painting by Henry Scott Tuke, 1910

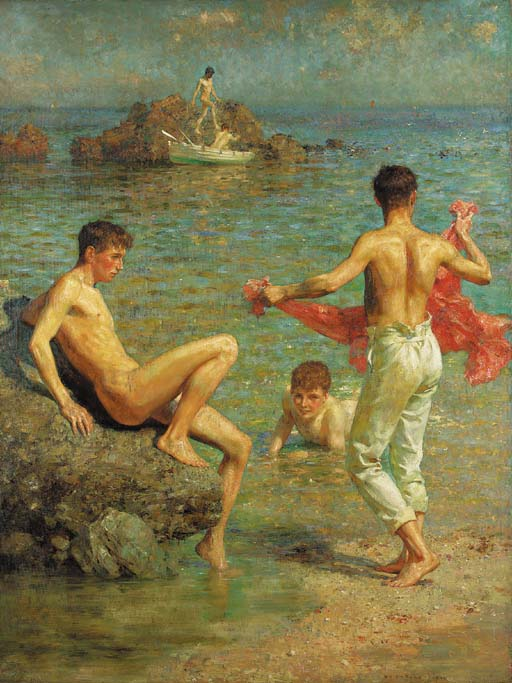
- Artist: Henry Scott Tuke
- Year: 1910
- Medium: Oil on canvas
- Movement: Edwardian
- Dimensions: 197.5 cm × 148.5 cm (77.8 in × 58.5 in)

Gleaming waters is a painting by the British painter Henry Scott Tuke. It is the largest work he ever painted and is considered one of his major works.

The composition of the painting shows a bathing scene with boys on the seashore in Cornwall. This painting had not been shown in Britain since the Royal Academy of Arts Summer Exhibition of 1911, where it was exhibited as number 441 and offered at the price of £400.

The painting was believed to be lost until its sale on 30 November 2000 by Christie’s in London. Previously, the painting had remained in the same family ownership since 1947, largely unnoticed by the public.

== Description ==
The painting shows five boys on a sunny day on the beach in Cornwall. All the boys are in the sea, three of them in the water. These three boys are in the foreground. The one on the left hand side is sitting naked on a rock, with one foot in the sea. The one in the middle is playing at the shallow water's edge. And the one on the right hand side, turning his back to the audience, is standing bare chested in the shallow water, wearing white trousers and looking to his friend, who is playing in the water. He holds his pinkish shirt in his hands as it flutters in the wind.

At some distance, but still close to the shore, two other boys are visible. One is balancing on the pointed stones of a rock, the other is sitting in a white rowing boat with a light green coat of paint just above the waterline.

The sun is reflected in the azure blue, partly green gleaming water.

Catherine Dinn states: "Although Henry Scott Tuke would put extra details and the finishing touches to his bathing paintings in the studio, photographic evidence exists to demonstrate that he worked on these canvases largely in the open air, accounting for their freshness of colour and the sparkling effects of sunlight on the sea and the naked flesh of his models. In this respect he remained true to the plein-air precepts of the Newlyn School."

== Location ==
Henry Scott Tuke painted Gleaming waters in the summer of 1910. It is set on Newporth Beach, a part-sandy, part-shingly beach close to Tuke's cliff-top home just south of Falmouth, which was accessible only by steep, over-grown paths, or by boat. Tuke recorded the topography of this picturesque beach so faithfully in his paintings that it is usually possible to identify the exact rocks depicted.

== Models ==
For this painting Henry Scott Tuke lists the following boys as his models:

- Charlie Mitchell: His boatman and regular model
- George Williams: The younger son of close neighbours. He was then aged around fifteen
- Maurice Clift: The nephew of a family friend
- Ainsley Marks

Due to Tuke's habit of sometimes interchanging heads and bodies of his models in his paintings, it is difficult to identify each figure exactly. However, the central (horizontal) figure is known to be Maurice Clift.

=== Charlie Mitchell and his pinkish shirt ===
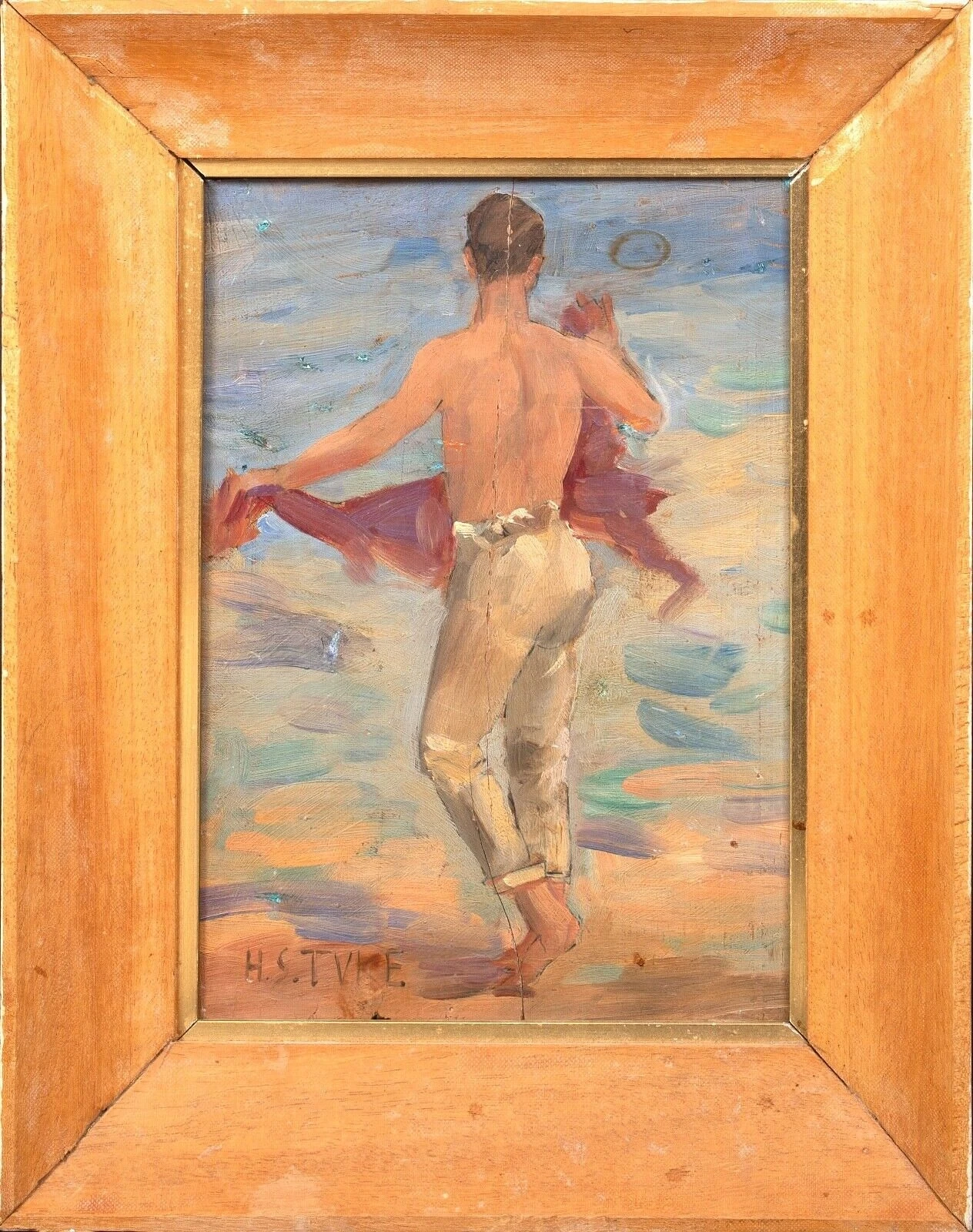
Charlie Mitchell (1885–1957), wearing the white trousers and holding his pinkish shirt, portrayed by Henry Scott Tuke. This sketch was a study for both paintings: Gleaming waters and Preparing to bathe.

Of the models shown in the painting Gleaming waters, also the bare-chested boy in the white trousers, turning his back to the audience, and holding his pinkish shirt in his hands, can be identified. It is Charlie Mitchell (1885–1957), a boy from Falmouth. Henry Scott Tuke also captured this motif as an individual portrait in 1910, titled Preparing to bathe. Catherine Wallace points out: "This dynamic oil of Tuke's boat-keeper, Charlie Mitchell, was painted in the summer of 1910 on Newporth beach, Falmouth. This study was for one of the main figures in Tuke's major painting, Gleaming waters."

Furthermore, it exists as a sketch, showing Charlie Mitchell in the same pose as in Gleaming waters and Preparing to bathe. The sketch bears a later added inscription on the back: Cornwall 1921, the year Tuke painted further similar portraits of Mitchell in Cornwall. Tuke repeated this motif in variations and in different techniques. There is a watercolour on paper, titled A bather on the rocks, signed and dated 1921, which shows Charlie Mitchell, lying bare chested on a rock, wearing the white trousers, holding his pinkish shirt in his right hand, and looking over the sea.

The use of a distinct jarring colour note as the fulcrum of chromatic organisation, such as the red jersey in the painting Ruby, Gold and Malachite (1901) or the pinkish shirt in Gleaming waters, could be compared with the practice of artists such as James McNeill Whistler and Albert Joseph Moore.

Henry Scott Tuke became fascinated and highly-skilled at painting the upper torso of the male nude. Charlie Mitchell was the inspiration for many of these paintings over the years. Frequently Tuke would paint him just wearing his white trousers, emphasising the beauty of his back.

There was a lifelong friendship between Henry Scott Tuke and Charlie Mitchell. Mitchell served as a model for Tuke in many of his paintings. Mitchell looked after Tuke's boats for 30 years and also served as his rower when Tuke wanted to paint ships further out from Swanpool Bay. Tuke left Mitchell £1,000 in his will.

== Perception – and the end of Tuke's eternal summer in Cornwall ==
Henry Scott Tuke is recognised as a leading exponent of what is now termed British Impressionism. Within a few years, however, harsh reality had broken into this sundrenched idyll. All of Tuke's regular models were eventually called up during World War I, and some were never to return, including Maurice Clift, who is visible in Gleaming waters, and who died of his wounds in France.

"Henry Scott Tuke continued to produce bathing subjects until the end of his life, but was aware that by the 1920s these paintings were perceived as anachronistic and repetitious. The apparent carefree innocence of the Edwardian age was gone forever."

— Catherine Dinn
