= Henry Scott Tuke =

English painter and photographer (1858–1929)

Henry Scott Tuke RA RWS
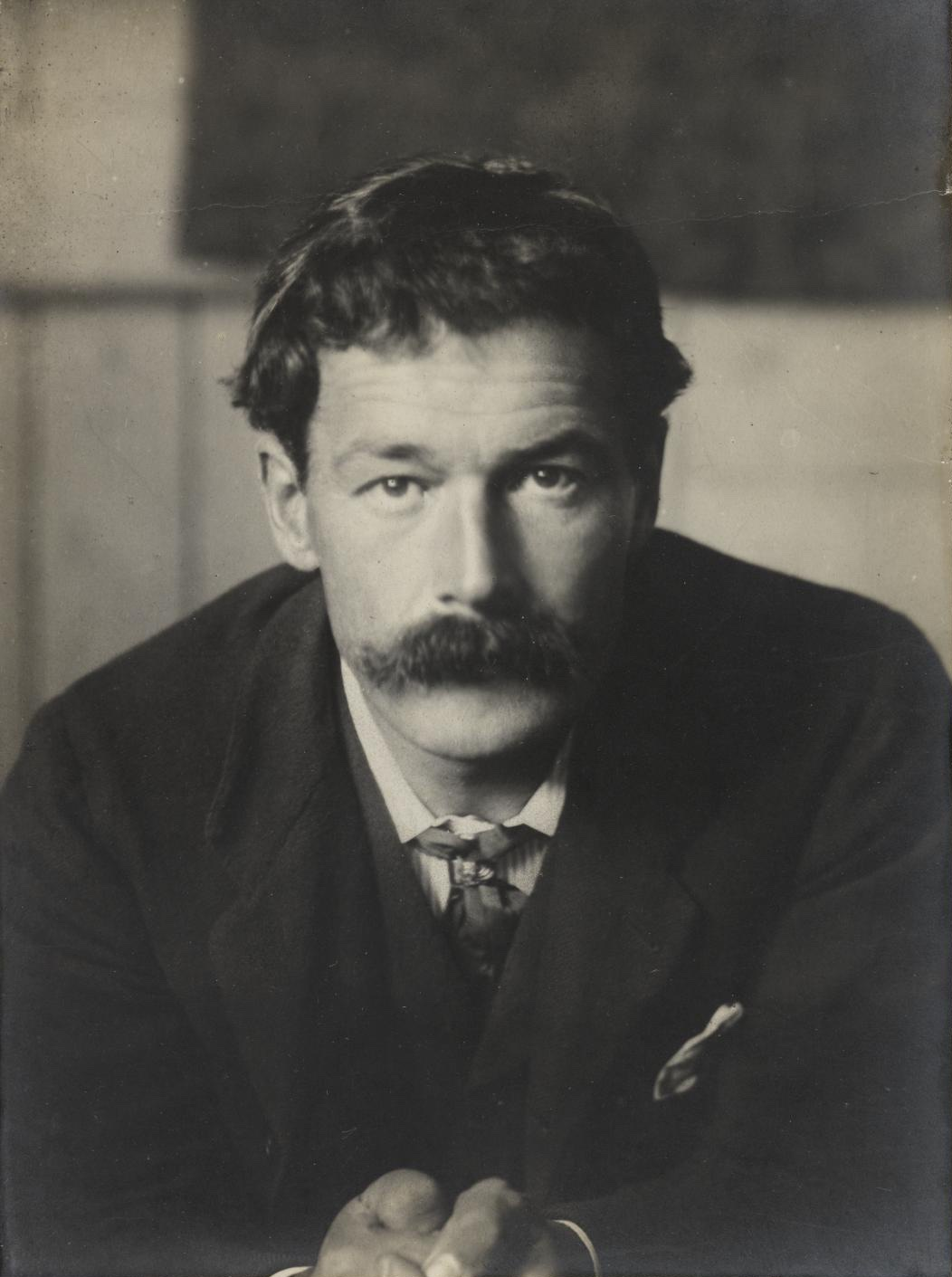
- Tuke in the 1890s
- Born: 12 June 1858; York, England
- Died: 13 March 1929 (aged 70); Falmouth, Cornwall, England
- Education: Slade School of Art
- Movement: Newlyn School
- Awards: Royal Academician; Royal Watercolour Society

Henry Scott Tuke RA RWS (12 June 1858 – 13 March 1929) was an English artist. His most notable work was in the Impressionist style and he is best known for his paintings of nude boys and young men.

Trained at the Slade School of Art under Alphonse Legros and Sir Edward Poynter, Tuke developed a close relationship with the Newlyn School of painters, his work being exhibited at the Royal Academy of Arts, of which he became a Full Member. In addition to his achievements as a figurative painter, he was an established maritime artist and produced many portraits of sailing ships. He was highly prolific, with over 1,300 works listed and more being discovered.

== Early life ==
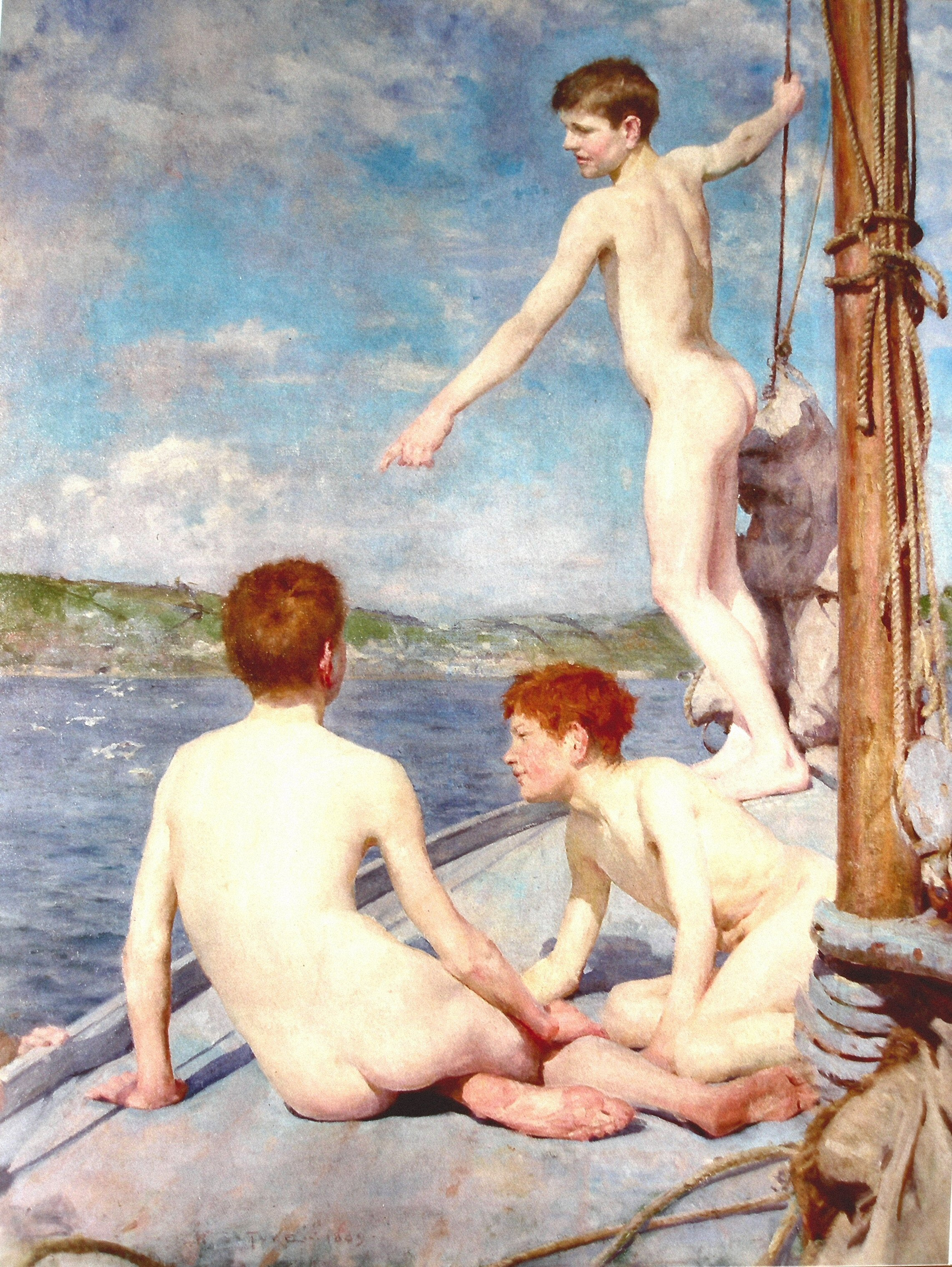
Henry Scott Tuke, The Bathers (1888; Leeds Art Gallery).

Henry Scott Tuke was born at Lawrence Street, York, into the prominent Quaker Tuke family. His older brother William Samuel Tuke was born two years earlier in 1856. His father, Daniel Hack Tuke (1827–1895), a well-known medical doctor specialising in psychiatry, was a campaigner for humane treatment of the insane. His great-great-grandfather William Tuke had founded the Retreat at York, one of the first modern insane asylums, in 1796. His great-grandfather Henry Tuke, grandfather Samuel Tuke and uncle James Hack Tuke were also well-known social activists. The Tuke family's ancestry can be traced back to Sir Brian Tuke, who served as an adviser to King Henry VIII of England (replacing Sir Thomas More).

In 1859, the family moved to Falmouth in Cornwall where it was hoped the warmer climate would benefit Tuke's father, Daniel, who had developed symptoms of tuberculosis. Daniel survived there and lived until he was 68. He established a small doctor's practice in his house in Wood Lane. Henry's younger sister, Maria Tuke Sainsbury (1861–1947), who wrote a biography of her brother Henry after his death, was born there. William went on to study medicine but Henry, or Harry as he was called by the family, showed no interest in the profession.

Tuke was encouraged to draw and paint from an early age. He and his siblings were taught by a governess at home. Maria described their childhood in Falmouth as "a very happy and healthy one". The long summer days spent on the beach and swimming in the sea had a lasting effect on Tuke; other enduring memories were the firm friendships the young Tuke formed. In Falmouth Tuke was introduced to the pleasures of nude sea bathing, a habit he continued into old age.

In 1874, Tuke moved to London and enrolled in the Slade School of Art. After graduating he travelled to Italy in 1880, and from 1881 to 1883 he lived in Paris, where he studied with the French history painter Jean-Paul Laurens and met the American painter John Singer Sargent, who was also a painter of male nudes, although this was little known in his lifetime.

During the 1880s, Tuke also met Oscar Wilde and other prominent poets and writers such as John Addington Symonds, most of whom were homosexual who celebrated the adolescent male. He wrote a "sonnet to youth" which was published anonymously in The Artist, and also contributed an essay to The Studio.

== Newlyn School ==
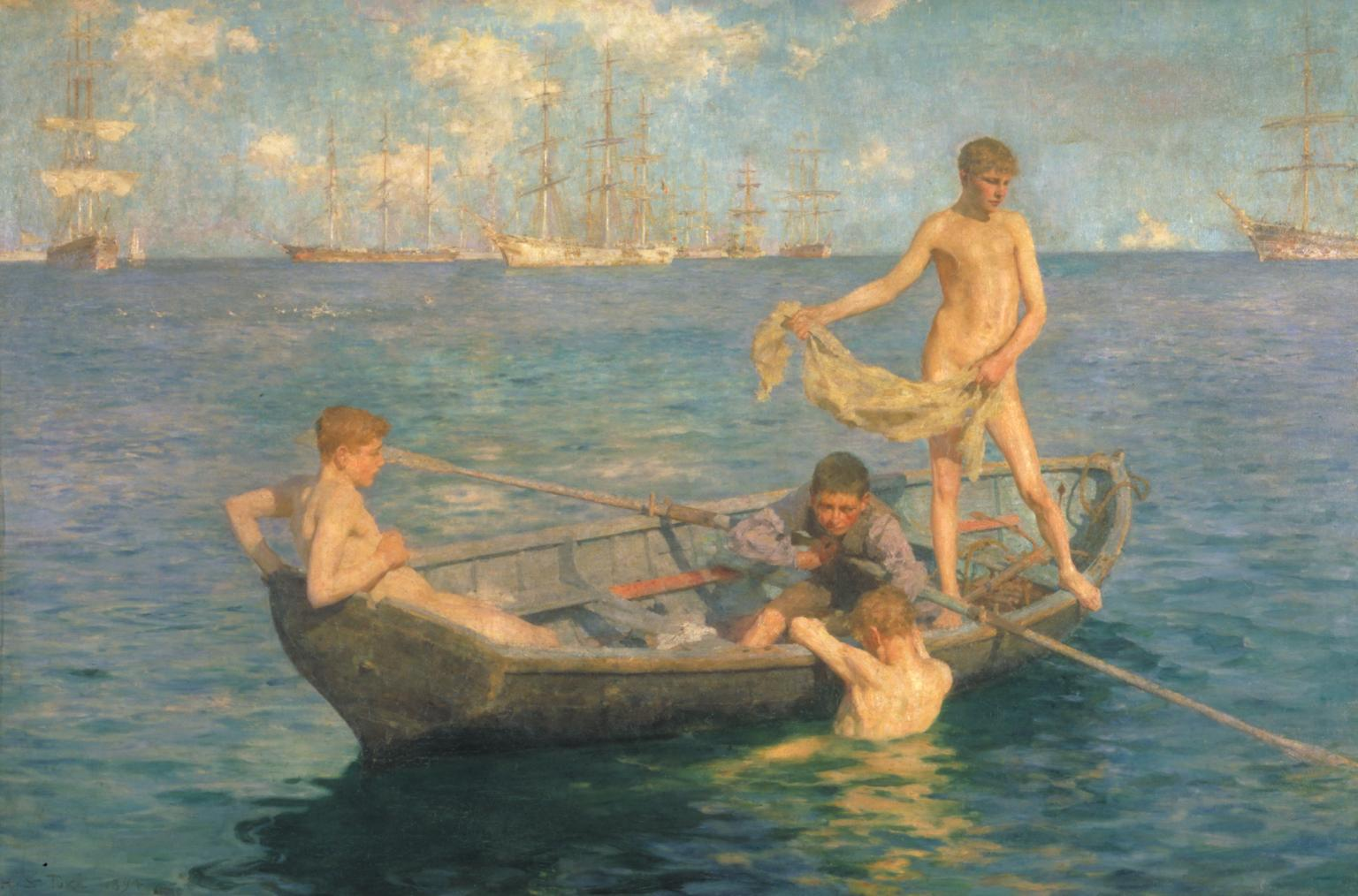
Henry Scott Tuke, August Blue (1893–94; Tate Britain, London).

In 1883, Tuke returned to Britain and moved to Newlyn, Cornwall joining a small colony of artists including Walter Langley, Albert Chevallier Tayler and Thomas Cooper Gotch. These painters, and others, became known as the Newlyn School. He worked from Rose Cottage at Tregadgwith Farm, Cornwall at the head of the Lamorna valley.

In Newlyn, in 1884, Tuke completed his first painting of boys in boats. Called Summertime, it depicts two local boys, John Wesley Kitching and John Cotton, in a punt called Little Argo. Tuke's style was more impressionistic than that of the other Newlyn painters and he only stayed a short time. However, he remained close friends with many of the artists until his death.

== Falmouth ==
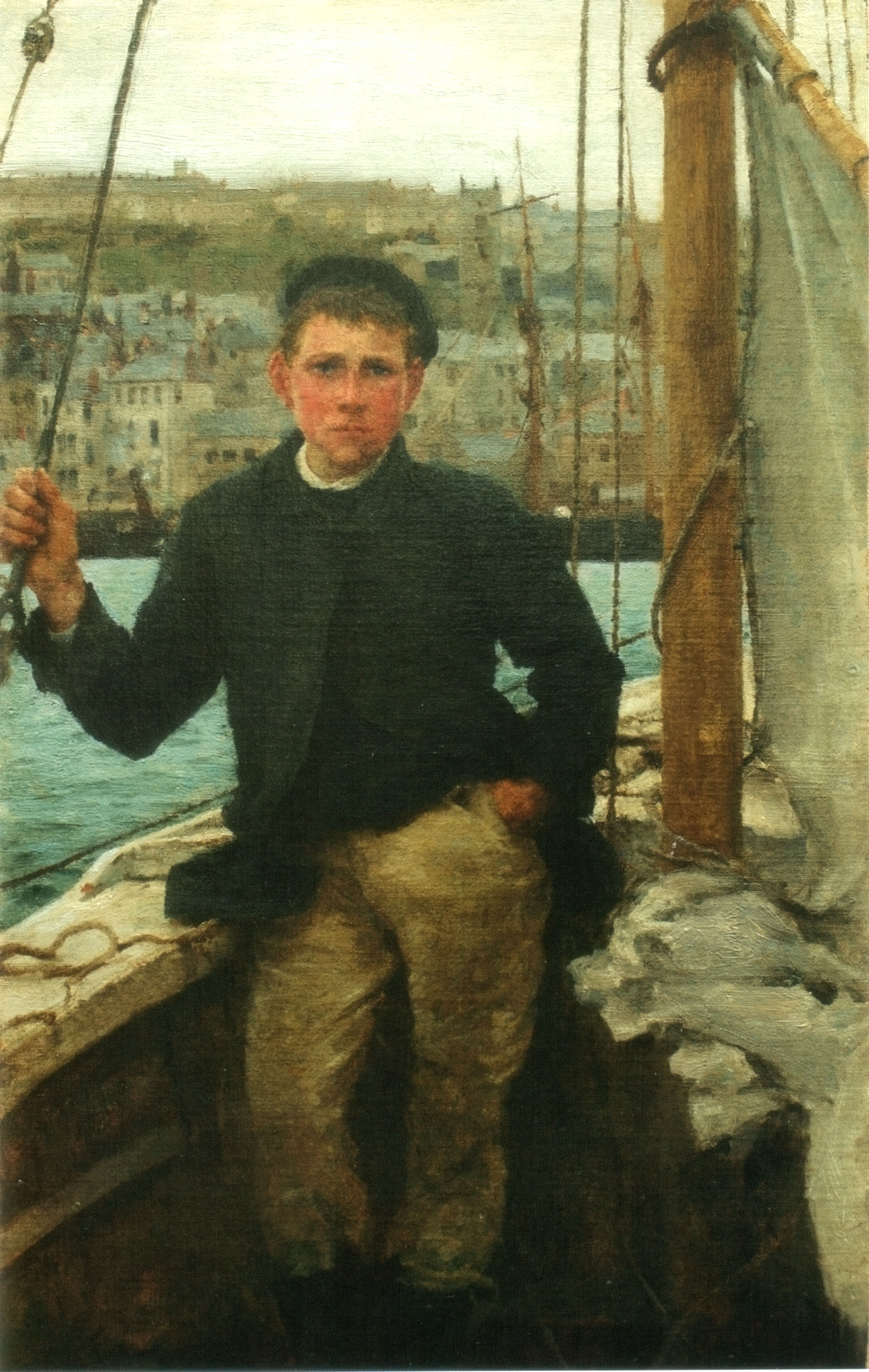
Our Jack, portrait of Jack Rolling circa 1886

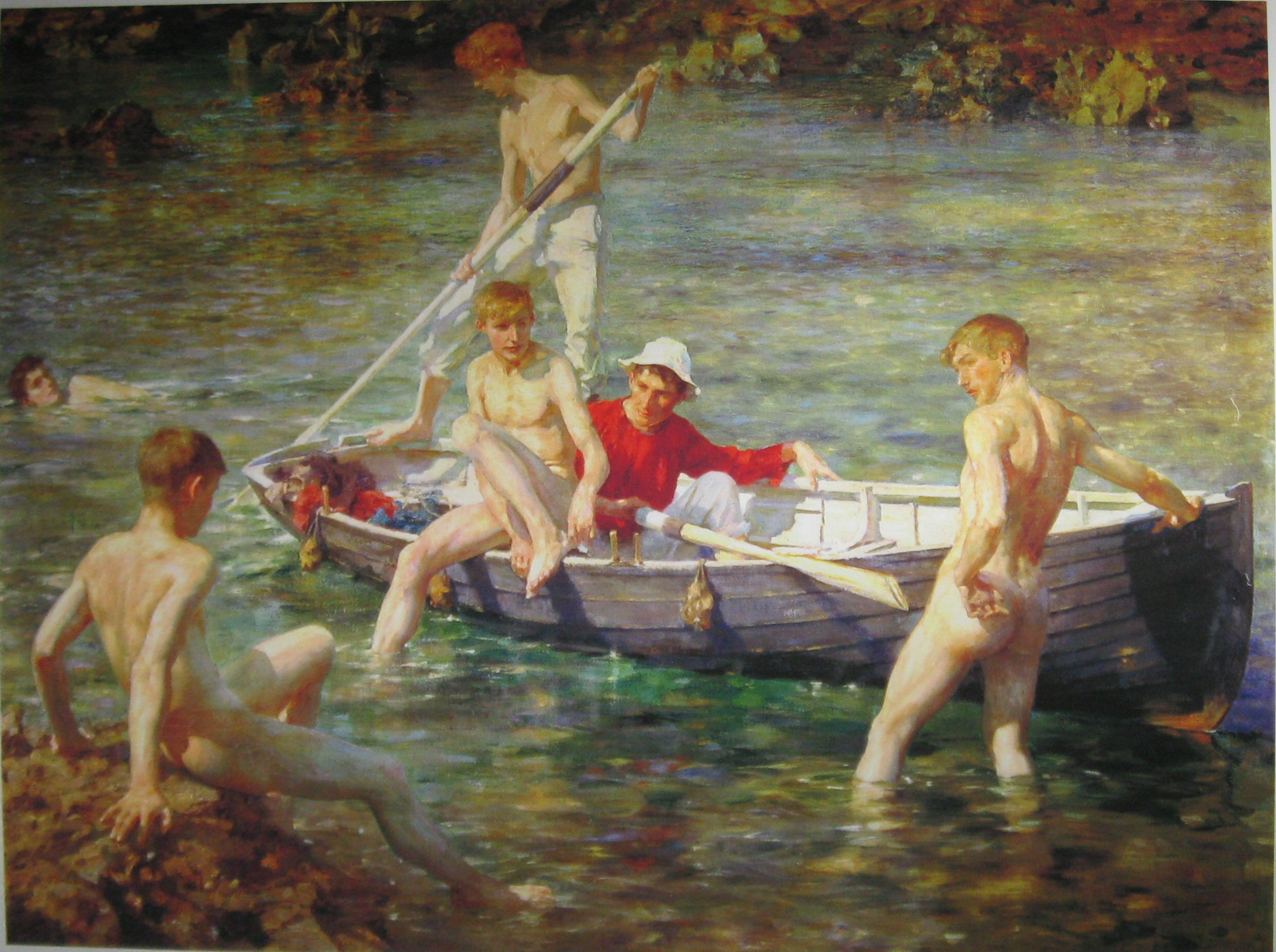
Henry Scott Tuke, Ruby, Gold and Malachite (1902; Guildhall Art Gallery, London).

Tuke painted oil studies of young male nudes during a tour of Italy in his early twenties in 1881, but the theme did not become central to his work until after 1885, when he had moved back to Falmouth, then still a secluded part of Cornwall and a part of the country with a very mild climate that was more agreeable for nude bathing. There Tuke focused on maritime scenes and portraits, which showed boys and young men bathing, fishing and sunbathing on sunny beaches.

He settled at Swanpool and bought a fishing boat for £40, 'Julie of Nantes', and converted it into a floating studio and living quarters. He rented two rooms in Pennance Cottage, situated between Pennance Point and Swanpool Beach.

The cottage remained Tuke's permanent base until his death, although he often lived aboard boats. Here he could indulge his passion for painting boys. His early models were brought down from London but he soon befriended some of the local fishermen and swimmers in Falmouth who became his close friends and models. These included Edward John "Johnny" Jackett (1878–1935), Charlie Mitchell (1885–1957), who looked after Tuke's boats, Willie Sainsbury, Tuke's eldest nephew, Leo Marshall, Georgie and Richard Fouracre (sons of his housekeeper), George Williams – younger son of close neighbours, Maurice Clift – nephew of a family friend, Ainsley Marks, Jack Rolling (in some sources misspelt "Rowling"), Freddy Hall, Bert White and Harry Cleave.

Owing to Tuke's habit of interchanging heads and bodies of his models in his paintings, it is often not possible to identify each figure exactly. All of Tuke's regular models were eventually called up during the First World War, and some did not return, including Maurice Clift (a model for August Blue) who was killed in France.

Tuke established an art gallery in Falmouth with William Ayerst Ingram as a commercial outlet mainly for their own paintings.

He would often commute to London as Falmouth was well served with a railway service and he was not therefore isolated from the London art scene. He produced numerous portraits of society figures, local officials and members of the Tuke family circle. He also painted many more saleable landscapes and was well regarded as a painter of ships in sail. Henry Scott Tuke was elected Associate of the Royal Academy in 1900 and Royal Academician in 1914.

== Style ==
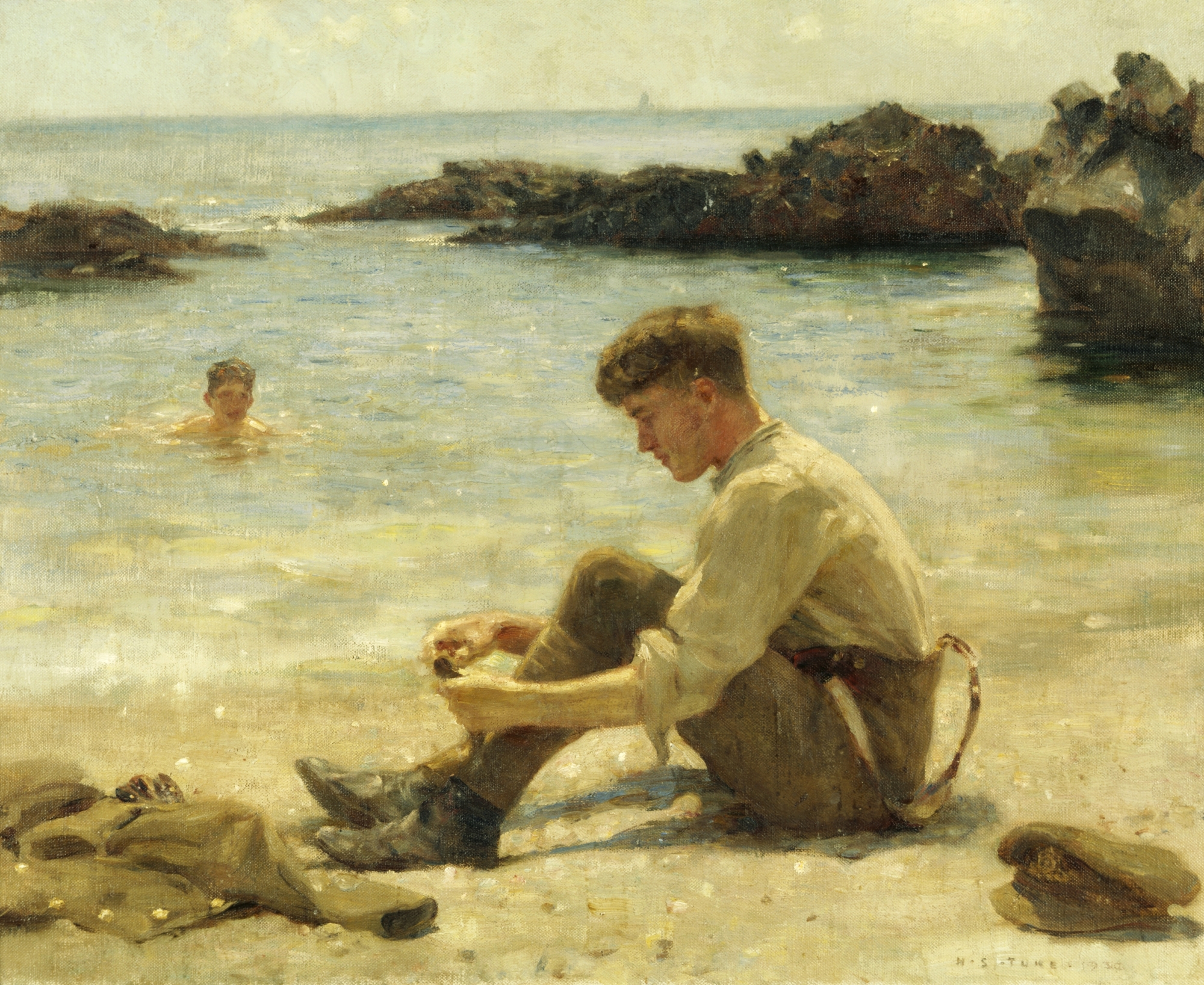
"A Soldier (possibly T. E. Lawrence) at Newporth Beach, near Falmouth" (between 1921 and 1922)

Tuke favoured rough, visible brush strokes, at a time when a smooth, polished finish was favoured by fashionable painters and critics. He had a strong sense of colour and excelled in the depiction of natural light, particularly the soft, fragile sunlight of the English summer. Although Tuke often finished paintings in the studio, photographic evidence shows that he worked mainly in the open air, which accounts for their freshness of colour and the realistic effects of sunlight reflected by the sea and on the naked flesh of his models.

In his early paintings, Tuke placed his male nudes in mythological contexts, but the critics found these works to be rather formal, lifeless and flaccid. From the 1890s, Tuke abandoned mythological themes and began to paint local boys fishing, sailing, swimming and diving, and also began to paint in a more naturalistic style. His handling of paint became freer, and he began using bold, fresh colour. One of his best-known paintings from this period is August Blue (1893–94; Tate, London), a study of four mostly nude youths bathing from a boat. The Looe artist, Lindsay Symington (1872–1942), modelled for the blonde boy holding onto the boat in the water; though not a regular model, Symington was a good friend of Tuke, the latter often visiting the Symington family home, Pixies' Holt, at Dartmeet. Tuke painted some female nudes but these were not as successful as his male nude paintings.

Tuke's paintings of nude youths are never explicitly sexual. The models' genitals are almost never shown, they are almost never in physical contact with each other, and there is never any suggestion of overt sexuality. Most of the paintings have the nude models standing or crouching on the beach facing out to sea, so only the back view is displayed.

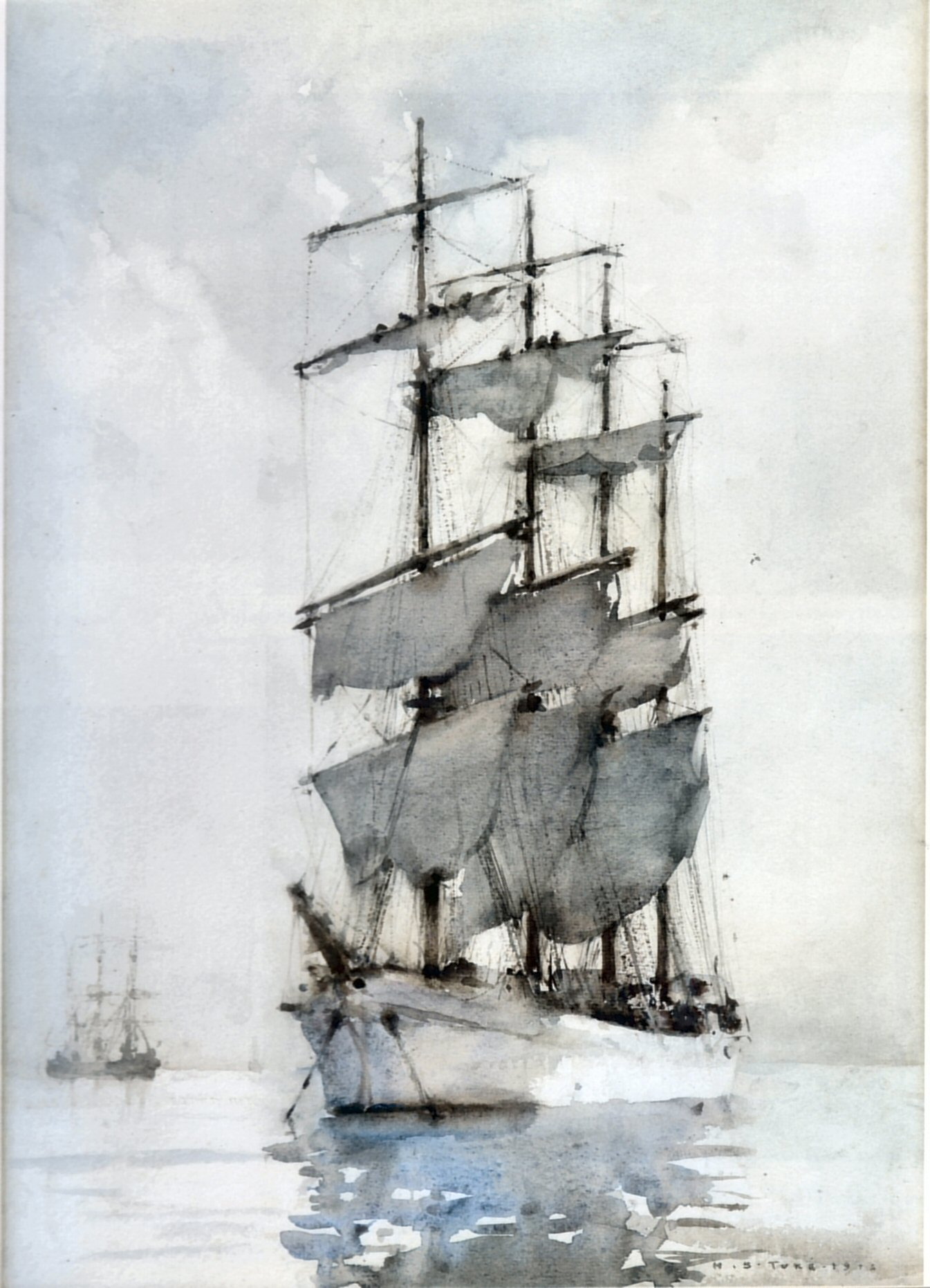
Four-Masted Barque, 1914

Tuke is also regarded as an important maritime artist. Over the years, he painted many pictures of the majestic sailing ships, mainly in watercolour, that were common until the 1930s. Tuke was often fascinated with the beauty of a fully rigged ship, and since his childhood could draw them from memory. His decision to return to Falmouth in 1885 was, in part, influenced by the constant presence of the ships there.

Tuke enjoyed a considerable reputation, and he earned enough money from his paintings to enable him to travel abroad and he painted in France, Italy and the West Indies. In 1900 a banquet was held in his honour at the Royal Cornwall Polytechnic Society. He was elected to the Royal Academy of Arts in 1914.

Major examples of his male nudes were purchased by major art galleries including The Bathers at Leeds Art Gallery in 1890 and August Blue at the Tate, London in 1894. But he was also well known as a portraitist, and maintained a London studio to work on his commissions. Among his best known portraits is that of soldier and writer T. E. Lawrence ("Lawrence of Arabia").

== Death ==
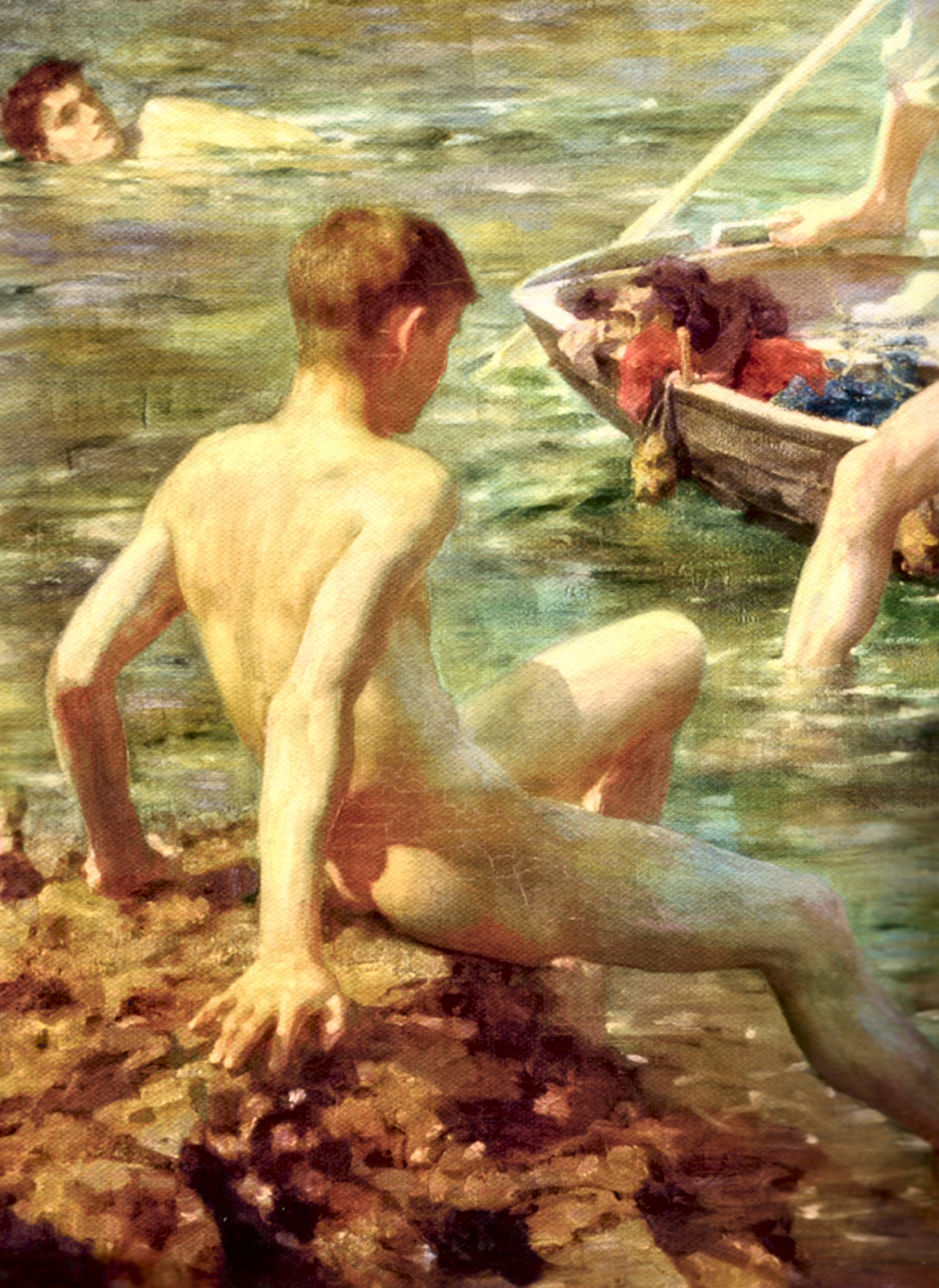
A detail from Ruby, Gold and Malachite; the model was Charlie Mitchell (1885–1957). Mitchell was Tuke's boatman for 30 years and in his will, Tuke left him £1,000.

In later life Tuke was in poor health for many years. He died in Falmouth in 1929 and was buried in a Falmouth cemetery close to his home. He kept a detailed diary all his life but only two volumes survived after his death, which have since been published. He also kept a detailed artist's Register, which survives and has been published by the Royal Cornwall Polytechnic Society in Falmouth.

== Legacy ==
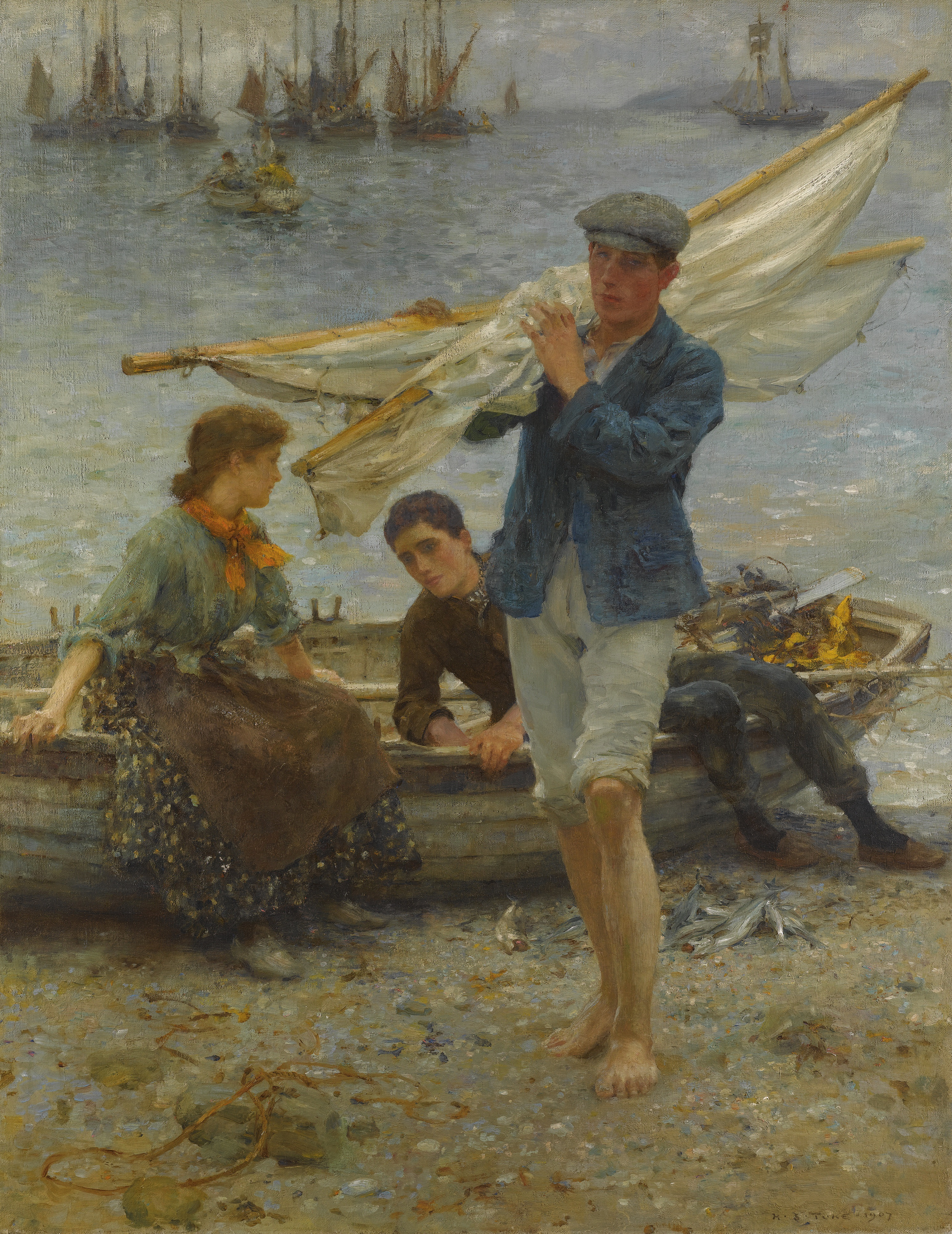
Return from Fishing (1907)

After his death, Tuke's reputation faded, and he was largely forgotten until the 1970s, when he was rediscovered by the first generation of openly gay artists and art collectors. He has since become something of a cult figure in gay cultural circles, with lavish editions of his paintings published and his works fetching high prices at auctions.

Elton John is a keen collector of Tuke's works and in 2008 lent eleven of his own pieces, including works in oil, pastel and watercolour, for an exhibition in Falmouth. John had once received a Tuke painting as a Christmas present from Freddie Mercury a month after the Queen singer's death.

== Commemoration ==
The student halls of residence at University College Falmouth are named after Tuke, a tribute to him as both an artist, and a famous resident of the town. At the time they were built and named, the school was known as the Falmouth College of Arts. Also in Falmouth is a collection of 279 of Tuke's works belonging to the Royal Cornwall Polytechnic Society, the largest such collection in public ownership. The bulk were donated by a single collector in the 1960s, but the Society maintains a policy of adding to the collection.

== Exhibitions and publications ==
In 2008, to mark the 150th anniversary of Tuke's birth, there were three exhibitions of his work:

- 3 May 2008 – 12 July 2008: Catching the light: the sunshine paintings of Henry Scott Tuke.
- 6 September 2008 – 27 September 2008: Tall ships.
- 10 May – 12 July 2008: Catching the Light: A Retrospective of Henry Scott Tuke, Royal Cornwall Museum, Truro
- 7 June – 12 July 2008: A Hidden Treasure Revealed: A selection of the works on paper by Henry Scott Tuke from the Royal Cornwall Polytechnic Society, the Royal Cornwall Museum, Truro
- 21 July – 28 August 2008: Catching the Light: The Art of Henry Scott Tuke at the Fine Art Society, New Bond Street, London
- 7 June - 12 September 2021 Watts Gallery https://www.wattsgallery.org.uk/whats-on/henry-scott-tuke/

== Collections ==
H.S. Tuke's works are held in a number of galleries and museums including Tate, Hunterian Art Gallery, Grundy Art Gallery, Walker Art Gallery, Leamington Spa Art Gallery & Museum, Bodleian Libraries, Royal Academy of Arts, Guildhall Art Gallery.

The papers of H.S. Tuke and Thomas Cooper Gotch are also held in the Tate Archive collections (TGA 9019). The papers in the Tate Archive provide context in which Tuke worked, not just the locations of his paintings and the relationships with his models, but his artistic allegiances such as his deep friendship with the painter Thomas Cooper Gotch.

== Other works ==
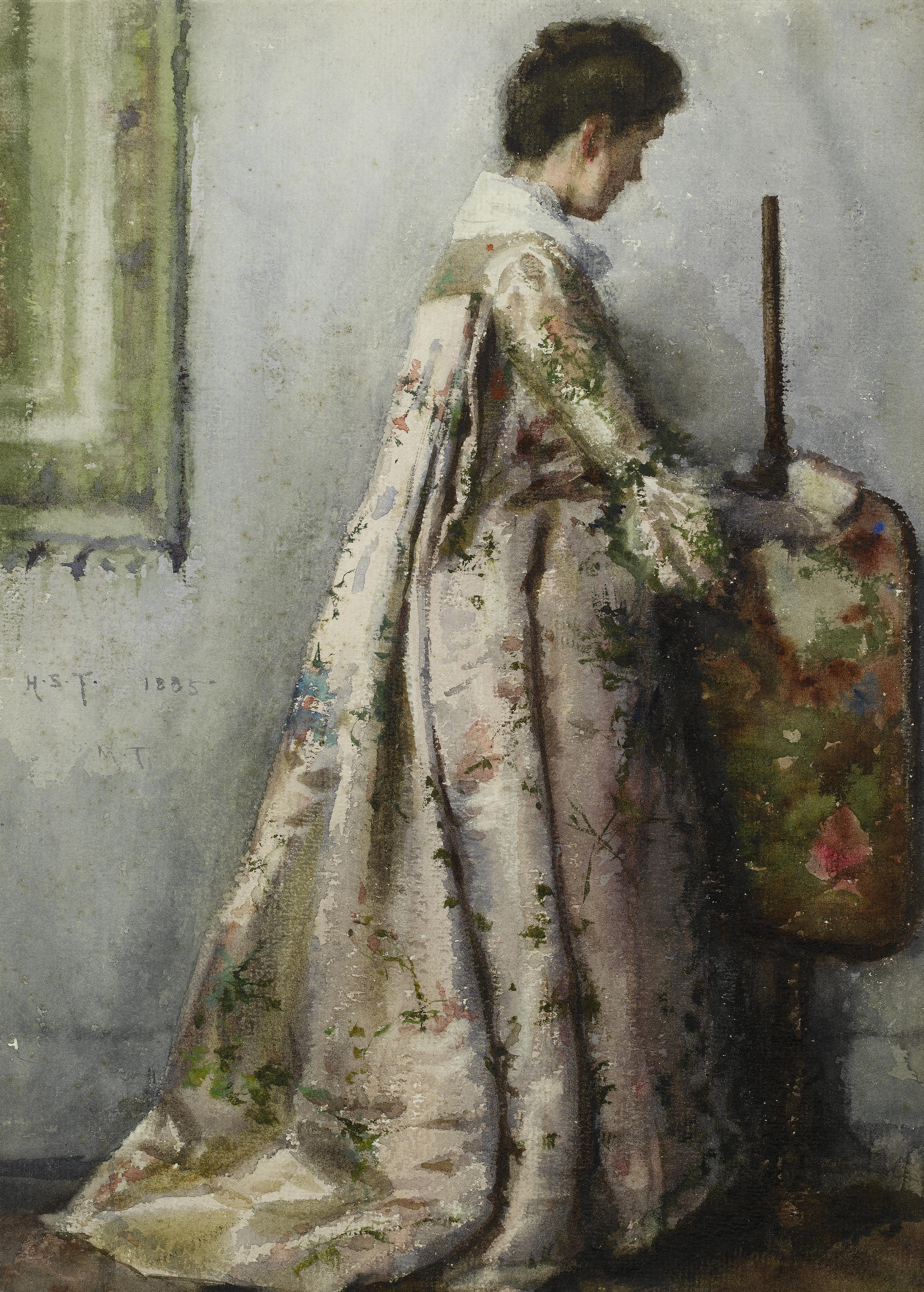
The silk gown, Portrait of Maria Tuke Sainsbury

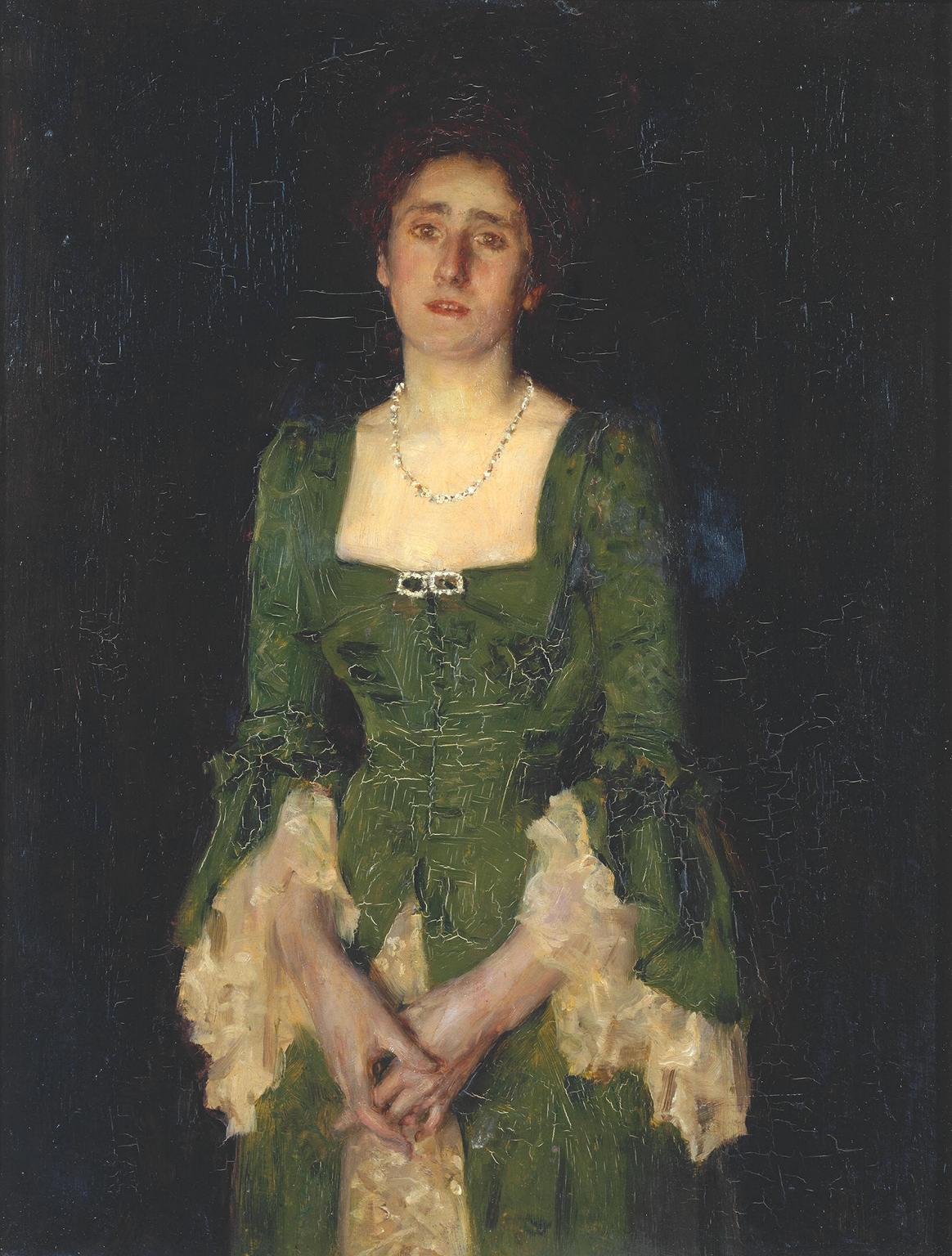
Portrait of Mrs Florence Humphris

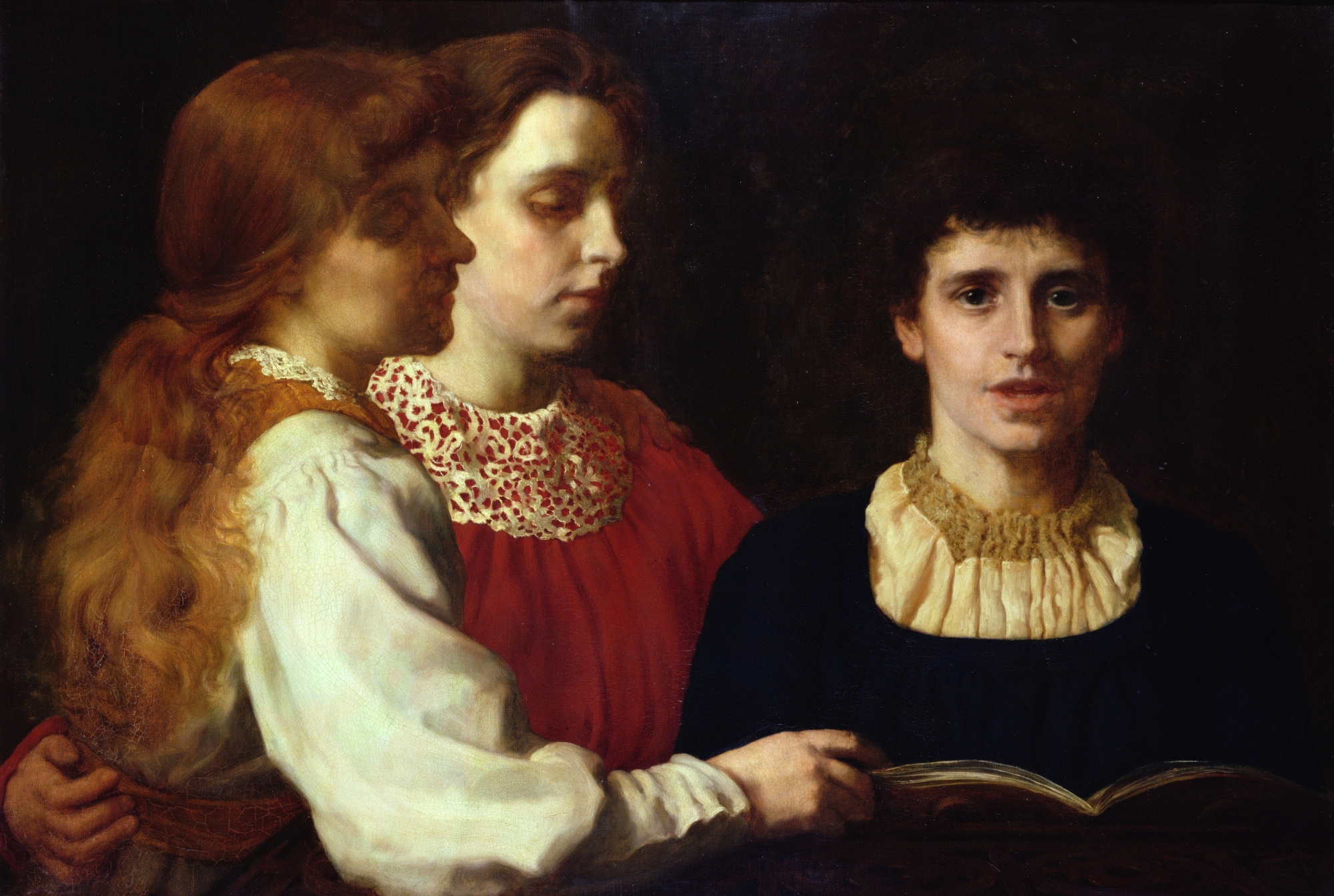
The Misses Santley - the family of Charles Santley

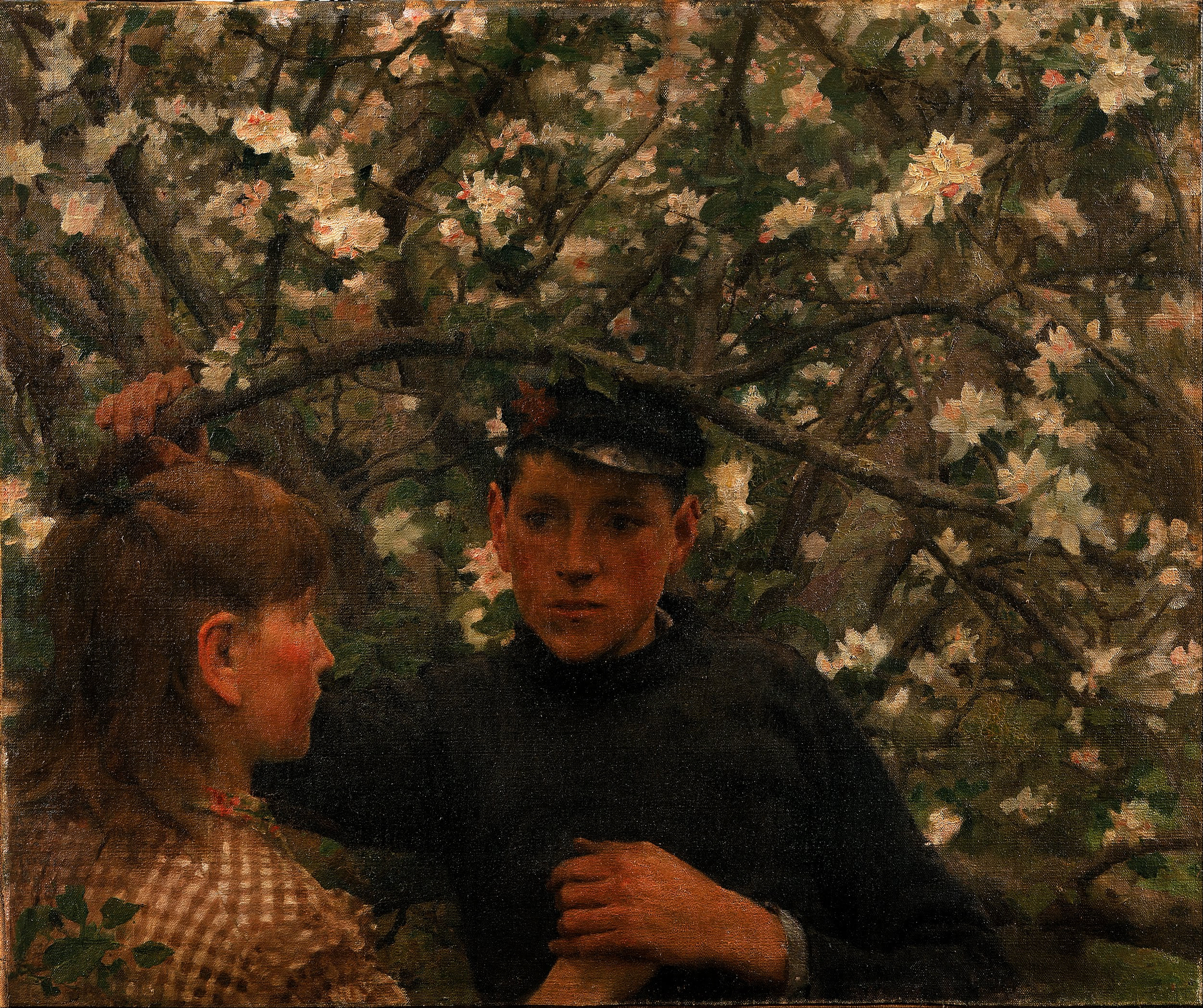
The Promise

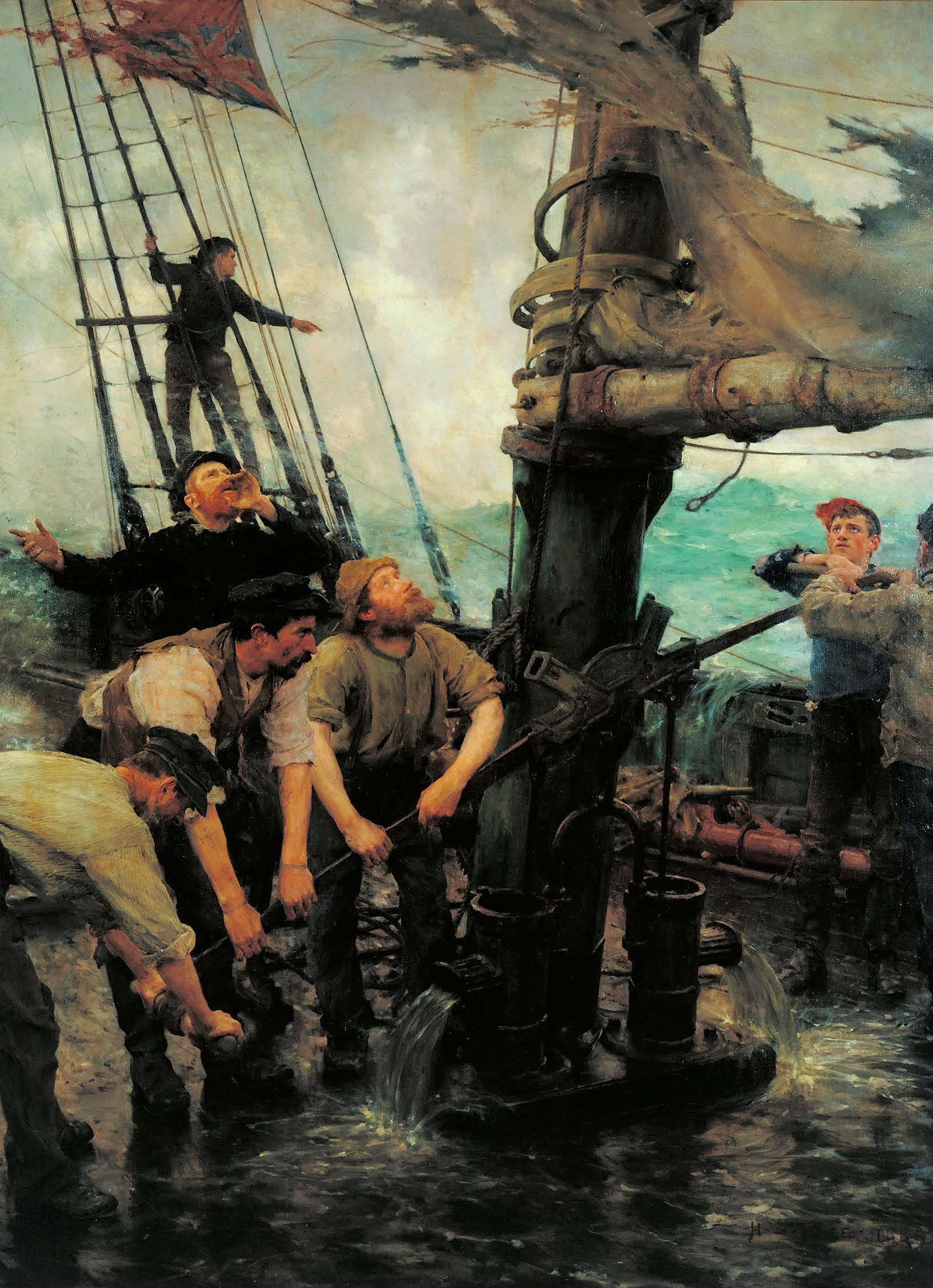
All Hands to the Pumps

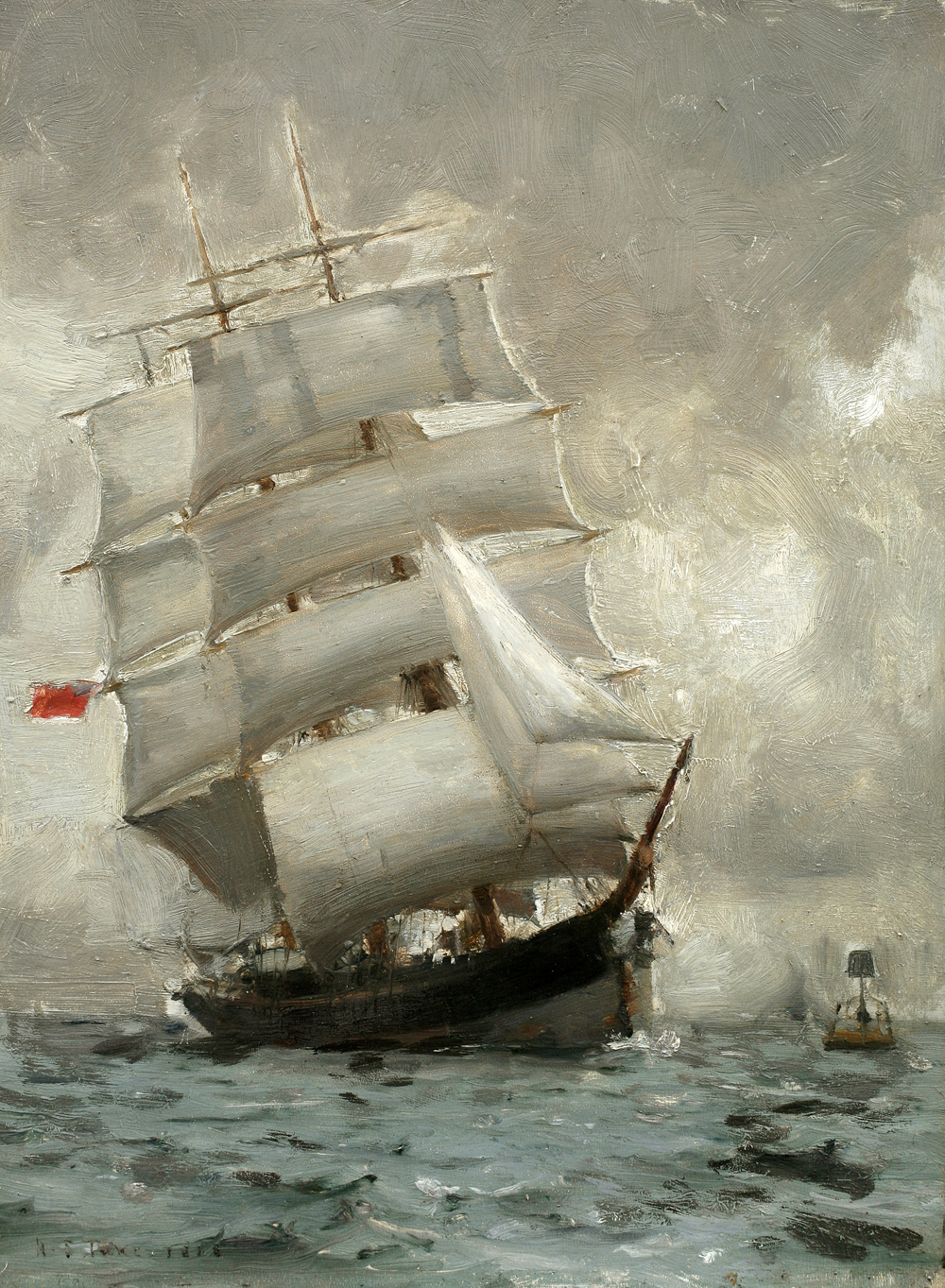
Rounding the Manacle Buoy

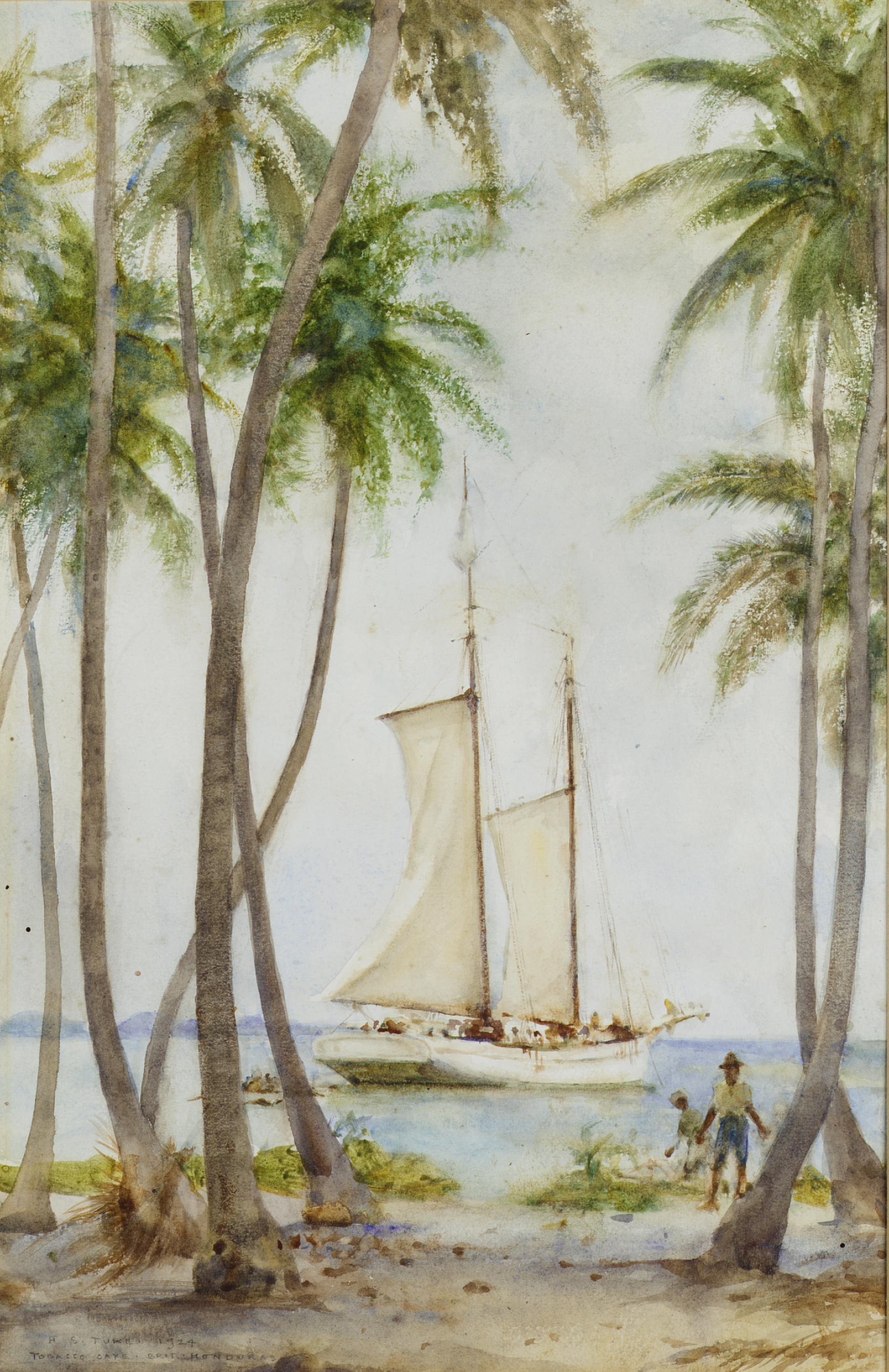
Honduras

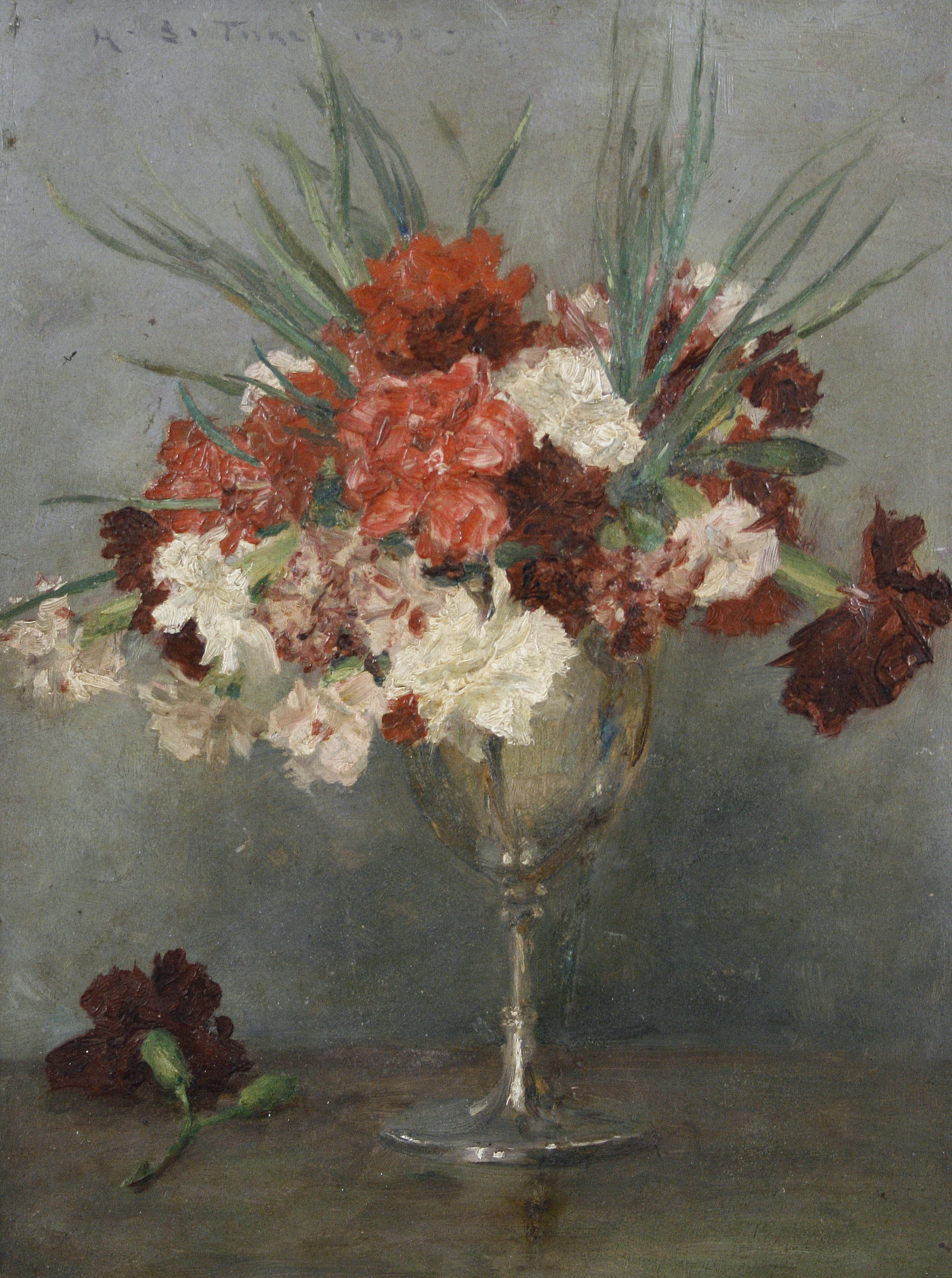
Carnations - a study

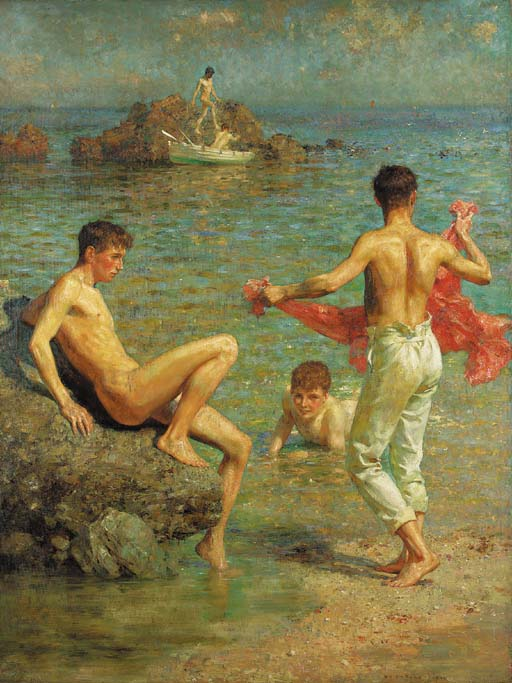
Gleaming waters

== Sources ==
- Cooper, Emmanuel (2003) The Life and Work of Henry Scott Tuke (with 35 colour and 25 monochrome plates), Heretic Books ISBN 0-85449-068-X
- Falmouth Art Gallery Collection volume 6 (2005) Falmouth Tukes Falmouth Art Gallery ISBN 1-903913-12-8
- Hatt, Michael (2006). "A Great Sight: Henry Scott Tuke and His Models". In Postle, Martin; Desmarais, Jane; Vaughan, William (eds.). Model and Supermodel: The Artist's Model in British Art and Culture. Critical perspectives in art history. Manchester: University Press. pp. 75–88. ISBN 978-0-7190-6662-7.
- Wainwright, David & Dinn, Catherine (1989) Henry Scott Tuke 1858–1929: under canvas, Sarema Press ISBN 1-870758-02-1
- Wallace, Catherine (2008) Catching the Light: the art and life of Henry Scott Tuke 1858–1929, Edinburgh: Atelier Books ISBN 1-873830-20-3
- Wallace, Catherine (2008) Henry Scott Tuke Paintings from Cornwall, Halsgrove ISBN 1-84114-705-2 (This features paintings in the collection of the Royal Cornwall Polytechnic Society.)
- Youmans, Joyce M. (2002). "Tuke, Henry Scott". glbtq.com. Archived from the original on 13 August 2007.
