= All Hands to the Pumps =

Painting by Henry Scott Tuke

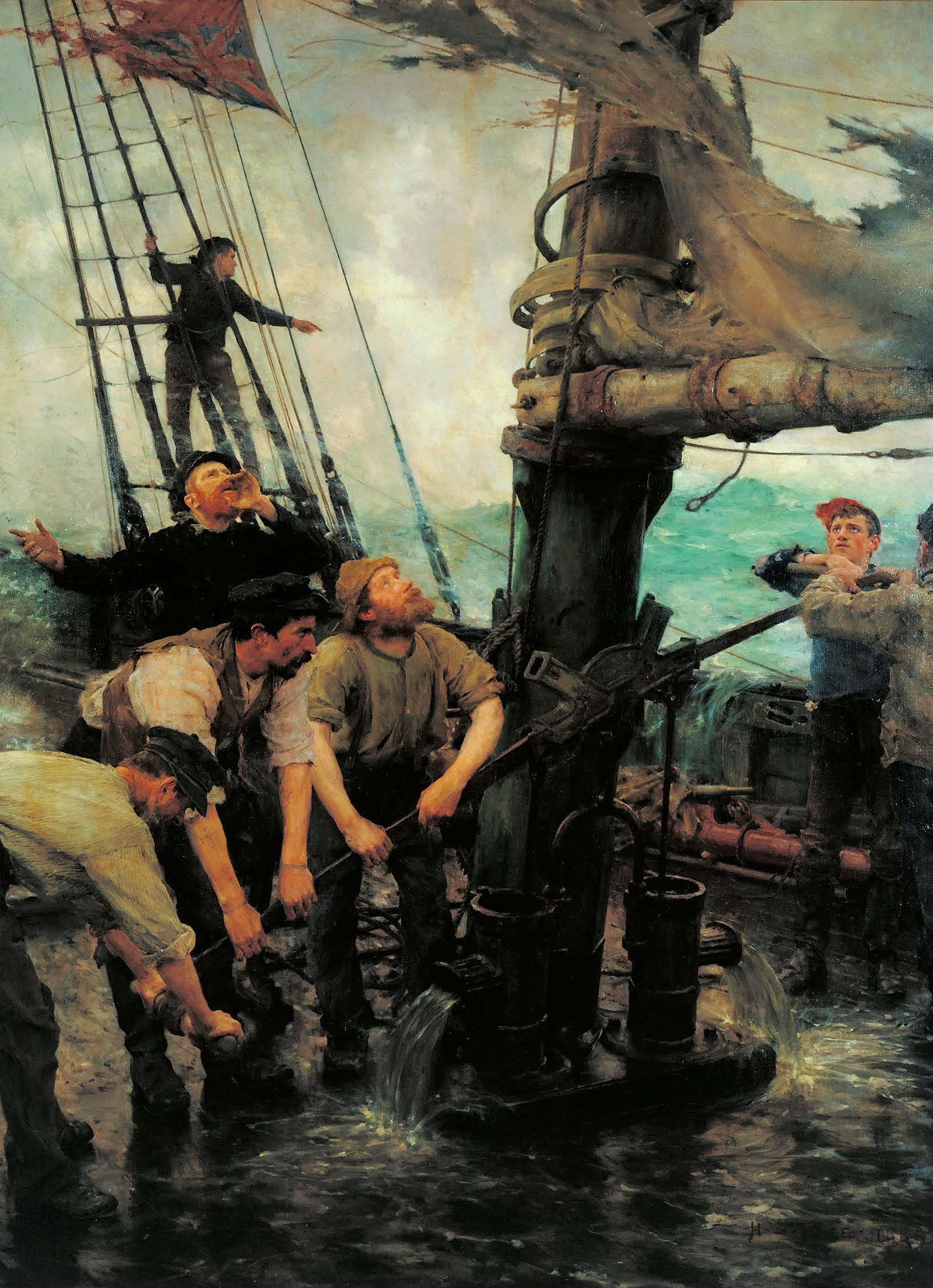
Henry Scott Tuke, All Hands to the Pumps, 1888–89, Tate Gallery, on display at Penlee House Gallery & Museum in Penzance

All Hands to the Pumps is an 1888–89 painting by British artist Henry Scott Tuke. At the time, the 21-year-old Tuke was living on the old French brig Julie of Nantes, which he anchored in Falmouth Harbour to use as a floating studio.

The painting measures 73 × 55 inches (190 × 140 cm). It depicts several crewmen on the deck of a ship in a storm, manning the pump to remove water from the vessel. The ship has lost at least one of its sails, and the deck is awash. The Red Ensign hangs upside-down from the shrouds to indicate the ship's distress. One man shouts up towards the rigging, and another is up in the shrouds gesturing at the swell. The lively composition uses diagonal lines — arms, rigging, mast, pump handle, wind-blown flag — to draw the eye around the painting.

University of Louisville professor Jongwoo Jeremy Kim detects a homoerotic subtext and speculates that the second figure from the left, with a white shirt under a grey waistcoat, wearing a cap, could be Tuke himself, looking across at Jack Rowling, one of Tuke's regular models, on the right in a red hat.

The work was exhibited at the Royal Academy Summer Exhibition in 1889; the same year, it became the first of Tuke's works to be purchased by the Chantrey Bequest Fund for the Tate Gallery. It is on loan to the Penlee House Gallery and Museum in Penzance.
