= Statue of William Shakespeare =

Statue of William Shakespeare may refer to the following monuments to William Shakespeare:

- Statue of William Shakespeare, Leicester Square, London, by Giovanni Fontana, 1874
- Statue of William Shakespeare (Roubiliac), in the British Library, London, by Louis-François Roubiliac, 1757
- Statue of William Shakespeare (Chicago), by William Ordway Partridge, 1893
- Statue of William Shakespeare (New York City) by John Quincy Adams Ward, 1870

== See also ==
- Memorials to William Shakespeare
