= Shakespeare Memorial (Philadelphia) =

Monument in Philadelphia

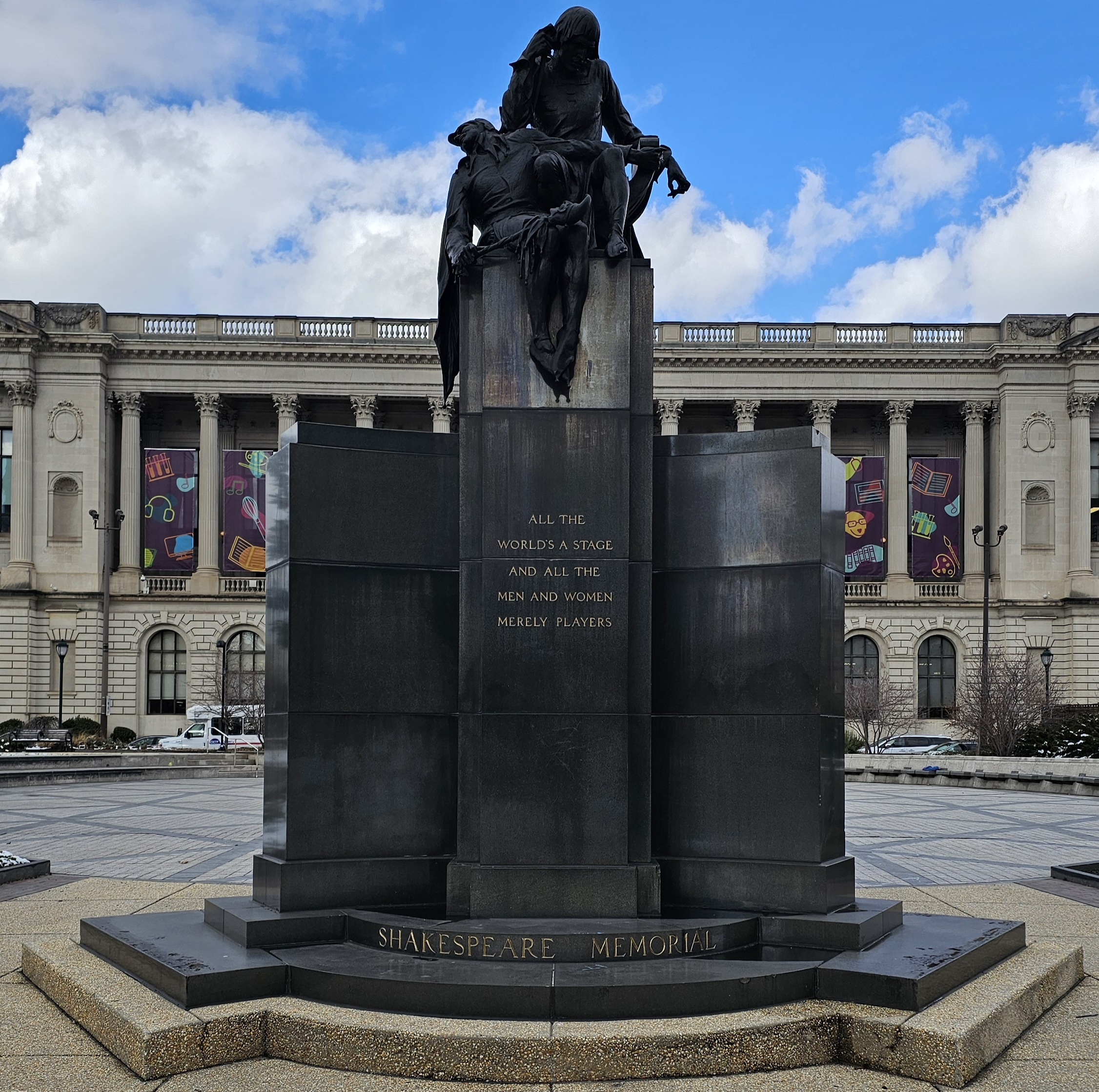
- The monument in 2024
- Interactive map of Shakespeare Memorial
- Location: Logan Circle, Philadelphia, Pennsylvania, United States
- Coordinates: 39°57′31.5″N 75°10′16.5″W
- Designer: Alexander Stirling Calder (sculptor); Wilson Eyre (architect); Gilbert McIlvaine (architect)
- Fabricator: Roman Bronze Works (statue); Wilson Eyre & McIlvaine (base)
- Type: Statue
- Material: Bronze (statue); Marble (base)
- Height: 20 feet 2 inches (6.15 m)
- Completion date: 1926
- Dedicated date: April 23, 1929
- Dedicated to: William Shakespeare

The Shakespeare Memorial is a monument honoring William Shakespeare located in Logan Circle in Philadelphia, Pennsylvania, United States. It consists of a bronze sculpture depicting Shakespeare's characters Prince Hamlet and Touchstone, designed by sculptor Alexander Stirling Calder, atop a marble base designed by architects Wilson Eyre and Gilbert McIlvaine. It was erected in 1928 and dedicated the following year. Initially located in front of the Parkway Central Library, it was relocated to its current location in 1953 due to the construction of the Vine Street Expressway.

== History ==
The idea for a memorial to William Shakespeare in Philadelphia was first raised in 1892 by the artist John Sartain. Sartain was a member of the Fairmount Park Art Association and proposed to the organization the creation of a memorial, though this did not initially come to fruition. However, in 1916—the 300th anniversary of Shakespeare's death—association members became reinterested in the idea. By 1917, funds had been secured for its creation.

Sculptor J. Massey Rhind offered his services for the design of the memorial, though the association ultimately commissioned Alexander Stirling Calder, with Gilbert McIlvaine and Wilson Eyre serving as architects. Contracts for the memorial were signed by those involved on August 1, 1919. For the location, the art association and the committee overseeing the memorial collaborated with several architects, such as Paul Philippe Cret, Jacques Gréber, and McIlvaine, and decided on a plot in front of the Parkway Central Library. The location was approved in 1926. That same year, between July and November, casting was performed at the Roman Bronze Works in New York City at a cost of $4,875 (equivalent to $88,657 in 2025).

The base of the memorial was created by the architectural firm of Wilson Eyre & McIlvaine, with carving done by John Meanwell & Sons. R. C. Ballinger & Company served as the primary contractor for the project. It was installed at the site in 1928 and subsequently dedicated on the anniversary of Shakespeare's birthday on April 23, 1929. However, in 1953, the memorial was moved to its current location at the nearby Logan Circle due to the construction of the Vine Street Expressway near the library. It is approximately 30 ft (9.1 m) south of where it was originally dedicated.

In 1993, the memorial was surveyed as part of the Save Outdoor Sculpture! project. It is owned by the city of Philadelphia. Additionally, a quarter-sized scale model of the sculpture is on display at the Brookgreen Gardens in South Carolina.

== Design ==
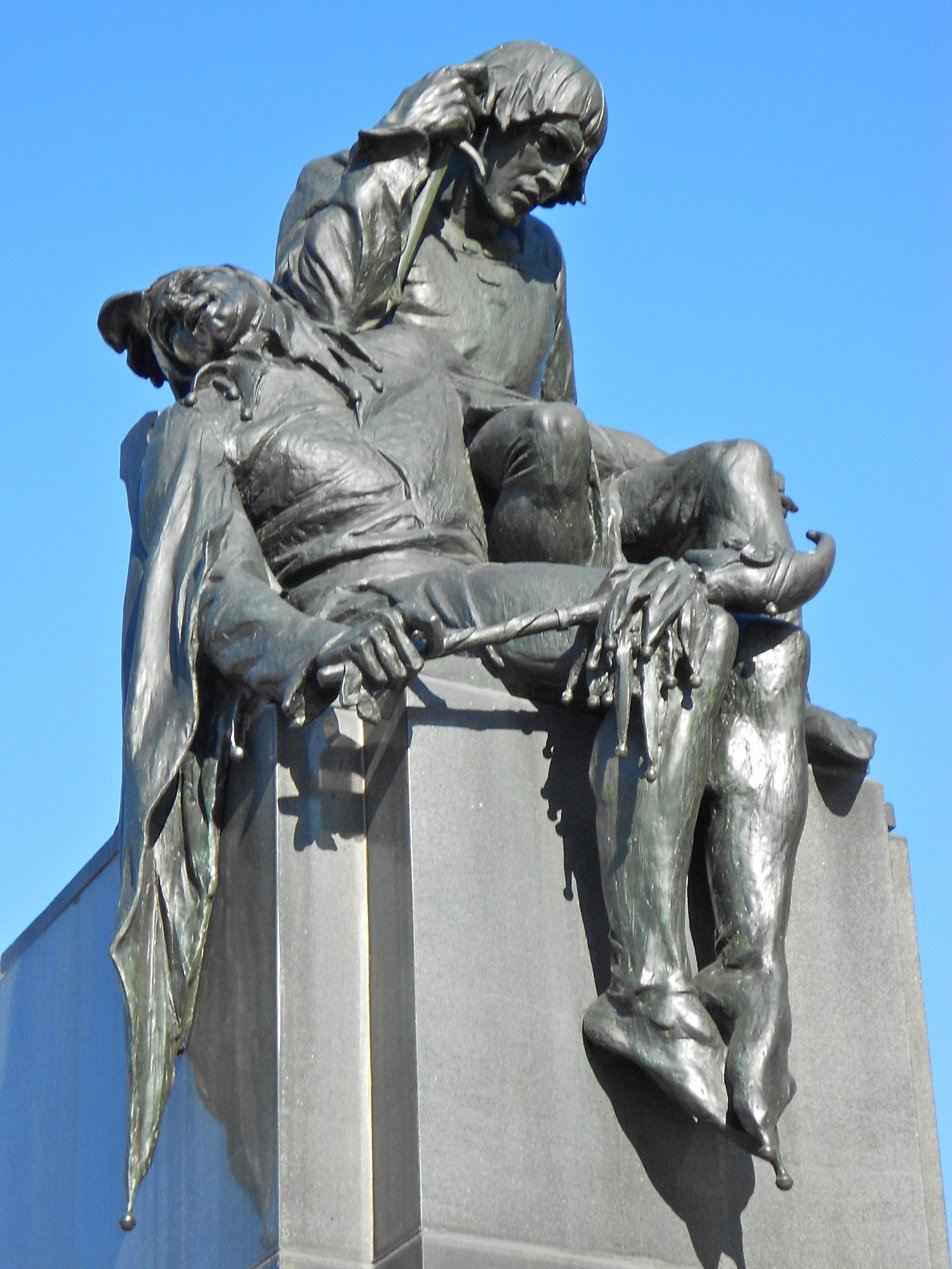
Close-up image of the sculpture

The memorial consists of a bronze sculpture measuring 6 ft (1.8 m) tall atop a black marble base measuring 14 ft 2 in (4.32 m) tall. The sculpture consists of two characters from Shakespeare's works, Prince Hamlet and Touchstone, who represent Tragedy and Comedy, respectively. Hamlet is shown seated on a tall base while Touchstone is seated at his feet. Hamlet is holding a bladed weapon in his right hand and is turned towards his left in a slightly hunched over position. Meanwhile, Touchstone, dressed as a jester, is leaning back and laughing, with his face turned towards his right. His left arm is draped over Hamlet's lap while his legs extend slightly over the base of the memorial. Calder's last name is featured on the sculpture, while the front of the base has the following inscription, part of the "All the world's a stage" monologue from Shakespeare's comedy As You Like It:

ALL THE/WORLD'S A STAGE,/AND ALL THE/MEN AND WOMEN/MERELY PLAYERS/SHAKESPEARE MEMORIAL

The rear of the base contains several inscriptions. On the left side:

THESE OUR ACTORS/BROUGHT LUSTER TO THE/PHILADELPHIA STAGE/THOMAS WIGNELL/WILLIAM B. WOOD/JOSEPH JEFFERSON/JOHN DREW/LOUISA LANE DREW/CHARLES BURKE/EDWIN FORREST/JAMES E. MURDOCH/E.L. DAVENPORT/JOHN DREW, JR.

On the center:

ERECTED 1928/BY THE/SHAKESPEARE SOCIETY/AND THE/FAIRMOUNT PARK/ART ASSOCIATION/WILSON EYRE & MCILVAINE/ARCHITECTS/ALEXANDER STIRLING CALDER/SCULPTOR

On the right:

BY THEIR STUDY OF/SHAKESPEARE'S WORKS/THESE SCHOLARS ADDED/TO THE DISTINCTION OF/PHILADELPHIA LETTERS/JOSEPH DENNIE(sic)/FIRST AMERICAN EDITOR/OF SHAKESPEARE/HORAE HOWARD FURNESS/EDITOR OF NEW VARIORUM SHAKESPEARE/ASA ISRAEL FISH/FOUNDER OF THE SHAKSPERE(sic)/SOCIETY OF PHILADELPHIA/HORACE HOWARD FURNESS JR./EDITOR OF/NEW VARIORUM SHAKESPEARE

Additionally, the seal of the Fairmount Park Art Association appears on the middle section of the rear of the base.

It is located at Logan Circle, near the intersection of Benjamin Franklin Parkway and 18th Street. It is near the Swann Memorial Fountain, which was also designed by Calder.

== See also ==
- List of public art in Philadelphia
- Memorials to William Shakespeare
