= Statue of William Shakespeare (Chicago) =

Monument in Chicago, Illinois, U.S.

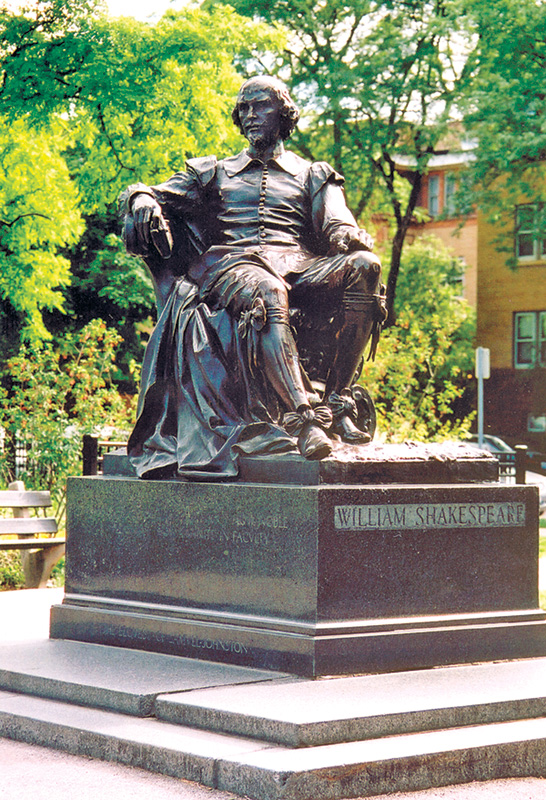
- Subject: William Shakespeare
- Location: Chicago, Illinois, U.S.; 41°55′25.8″N 87°38′10.4″W

A statue of William Shakespeare, sometimes called the William Shakespeare Monument, is installed in Chicago's Lincoln Park, in the U.S. state of Illinois. The work by William Ordway Partridge was created in 1893 and installed in 1894. It is a bronze sculpture on a granite base. He is shown holding a book.

== See also ==
- Memorials to William Shakespeare
