= Shakespeare Tercentenary of 1864 =

Celebrations of Shakespeare's works

Shakespeare and the Pigmies in Punch, 30th January 1864, satirised the rivalry between those seeking to commemorate Shakespeare

The Shakespeare Tercentenary of 1864 was a widespread commemoration of the life and works of William Shakespeare held on the tercentenary of his birth. Celebrations were held across Britain as well as abroad.

== Background ==
Leading up to the tercentenary competing institutions emerged, with rivalries particularly between the Tercentenary Committee in Stratford-upon-Avon and the National Shakespeare Committee in London, led by James Halliwell and William Hepworth Dixon, to provide the official memorial scheme of Shakespeare. The Stratford committee believed that with the ease of transport brought by the advent of railways, there was no need to hold celebrations in London which would detract from those held in the city of Shakespeare's birth. The fierceness of competition between both committees in the months leading up to the intended day of celebration attracted significant publicity. A cartoon in Punch in January 1864 satirised the rivalry, with "pigmies" representing the many people who hoped to attach themselves to the memorialisation of Shakespeare.

== Celebrations ==
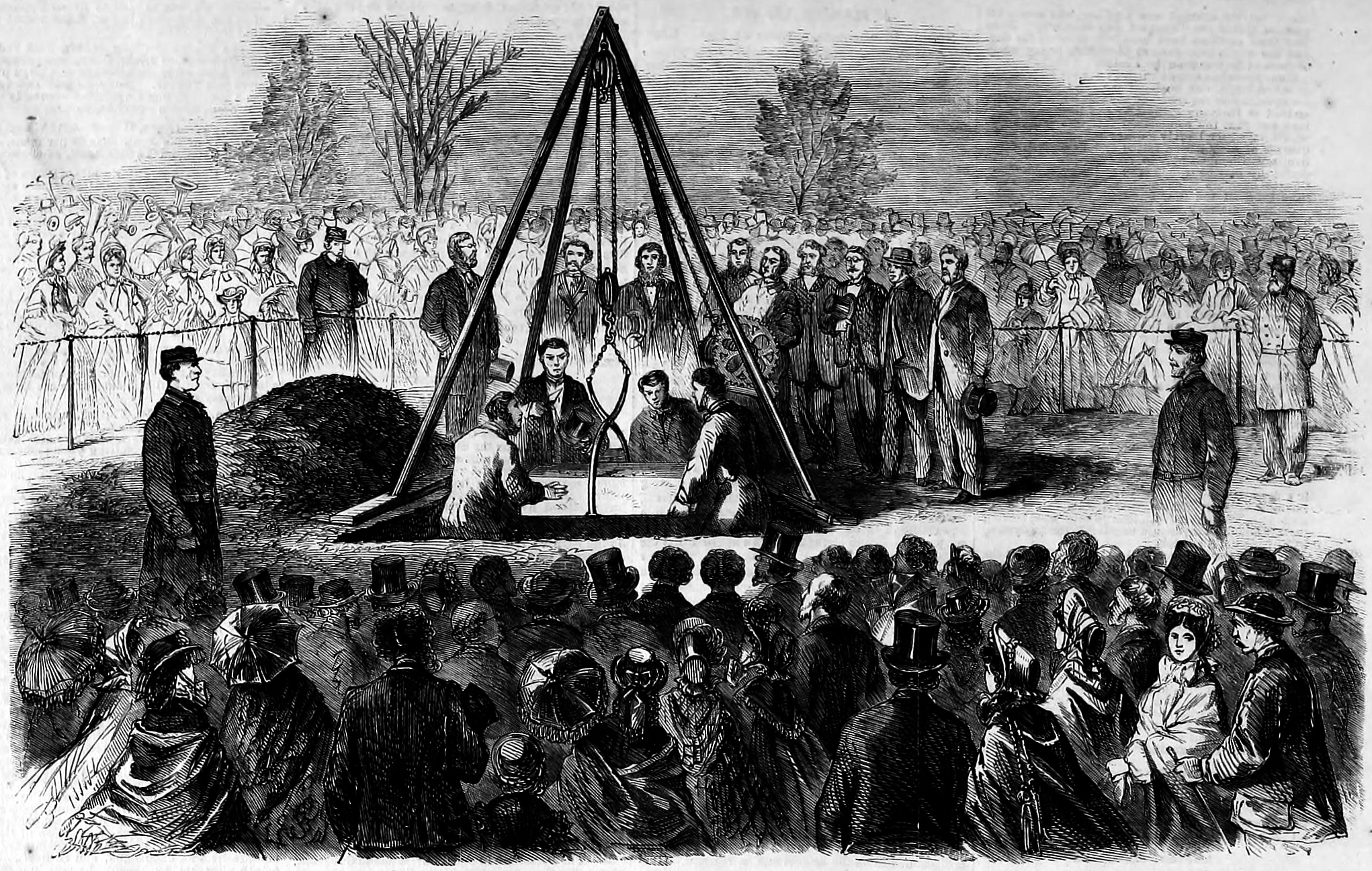
The laying of the cornerstone of the Statue of William Shakespeare in Central Park

The competition of the committees weakened the celebrations between both. While a national monument for Shakespeare was intended in both Stratford and London, neither ended up being erected. The committee in London was particularly badly organised, internal divisions and disputes were publicised in the rival magazines of The Reader and The Athenaeum. With insufficient funds for a statue, an oak donated by Queen Victoria was planted on Primrose Hill the intended site of a monument. The tree did not grow well and was lost by the end of the century. A replacement tree was planted on the quatercentenary but the specific location of it has also since been lost. In Stratford, similarly, no statue was erected.

The efforts of Edward Fordham Flower however allowed for greater celebrations including a banquet, fancy dress ball and concerts and performances of Shakespeare's plays held in a specialised pavilion. In New York City, a group from the Century Association successfully funded the creation of a Statue of William Shakespeare in Central Park.

Despite the struggles of producing a monument for Shakespeare in Britain, large body of literary Shakespeareana was still produced, an area in which commemoration of Shakespeare found greater success. Following the squabbles over commemorating Shakespeare in a physical monument, the idea that Shakespeare could be memorialised adequately in works of print was put forward. Howard Staunton produced a serialised photographic facsimile of Shakespeare's First Folio. Cassell similarly sold an illustrated serial of the works of Shakespeare, marketed as a "monument". Like the Shakespeare Jubilee before it and the 1916 Tercentenary of Shakespeare's death, the event raised public interest in Shakespeare and contributed to his status as a national hero.

== See also ==
- Shakespeare Jubilee
- Shakespeare Tercentenary of 1916
