= Statue of William Shakespeare (New York City) =

Bronze statue by John Quincy Adams Ward

William Shakespeare
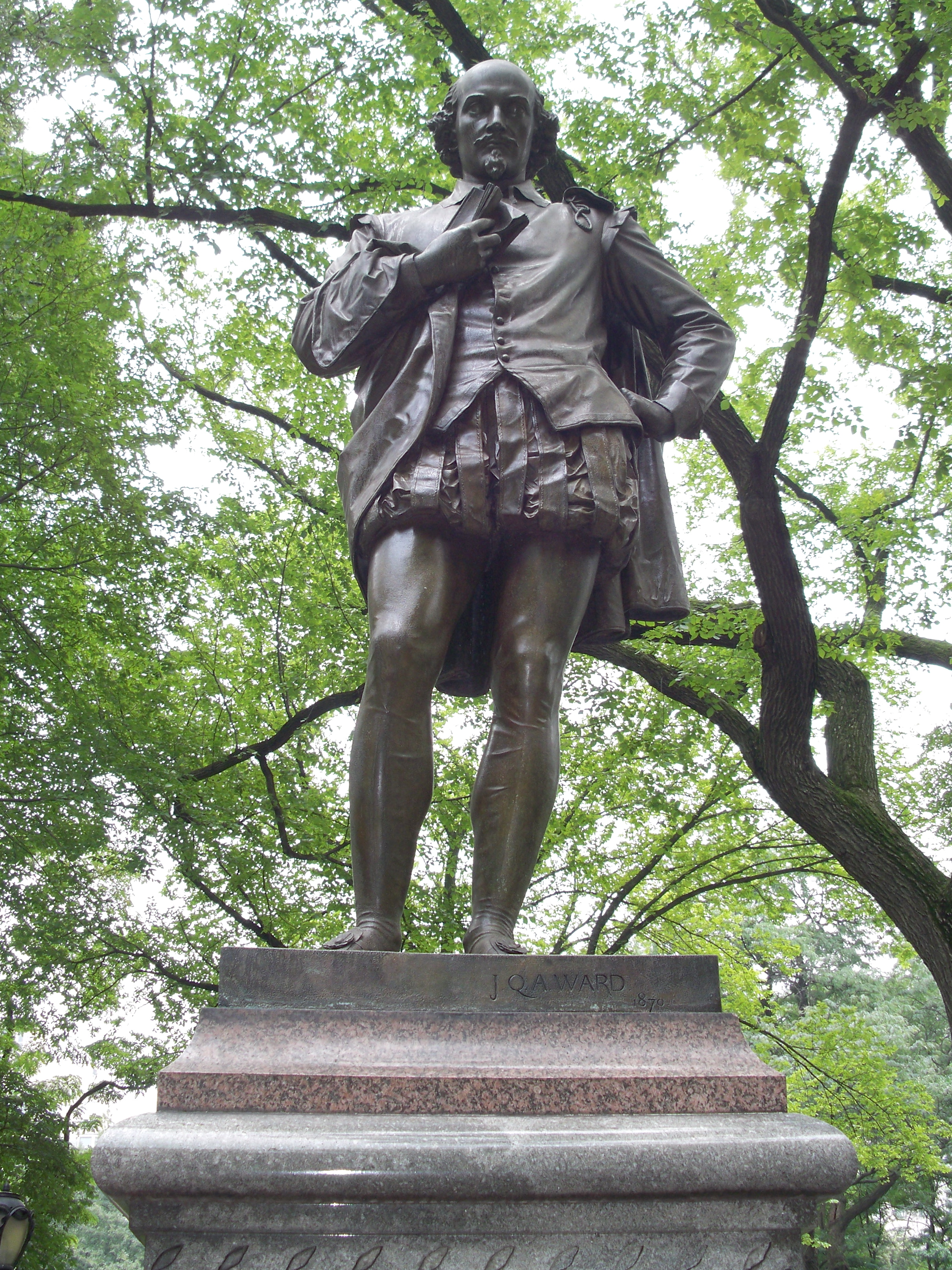
- The sculpture in 2009
- Artist: John Quincy Adams Ward
- Year: 1870
- Type: Sculpture
- Medium: Bronze
- Subject: William Shakespeare
- Location: New York City, New York, United States; 40°46′11″N 73°58′21″W

William Shakespeare is an outdoor bronze sculpture of William Shakespeare by John Quincy Adams Ward, located in Central Park in Manhattan, New York.

The cornerstone for the statue was laid on April 23, 1864, the tercentenary of William Shakespeare's birth. Eight years and one month later, on May 23, 1872, the completed statue was unveiled.

Ward based the likeness on the Chandos portrait, the Stratford bust, and the engraved portrait of Shakespeare by Martin Droeshout, on the title page of Shakespeare's the First Folio. The costume was based on one worn by Edwin Booth.

The pedestal for the statue was designed by Jacob Wrey Mould.

== Commission and funding ==
The commission for the statue seems to emerge from the private social club, the Century Association. The committee for the statue in 1864 comprised James Henry Hackett, William Wheatley, Edwin Booth, and Charles P. Daly, all ‘Centurions’ aside from Wheatley. By the unveiling of the statue, 14 out of 18 executive committee members and 38 out of 81 donors were Century Members, including William Cullen Bryant, one of the club’s “founding fathers.”

The Art Journal reported that the competition for submissions had begun in 1866, with models submitted in 1867.

Four thousand dollars towards the funding of the statue was raised at a benefit performance of Julius Caesar on November 24, 1864, performed by the sons of Junius Brutus Booth (Junius Brutus Booth Jr., Edwin Booth, and John Wilkes Booth) at the Winter Garden Theater. The play was interrupted by firebells as a set of Confederate saboteurs, the Confederate Army of Manhattan, had set a series of fires around Manhattan that night including at the Lafarge Hotel across the street from the Winter Garden Theatre. The morning after the benefit, the Booth brothers read about the fires over breakfast and John Wilkes exclaimed his sympathy for the Confederates, leading Edwin to kick him out of the house and vow never to speak to him. Less than a year later, John Wilkes assassinated President Lincoln.

== Incident at the unveiling ==
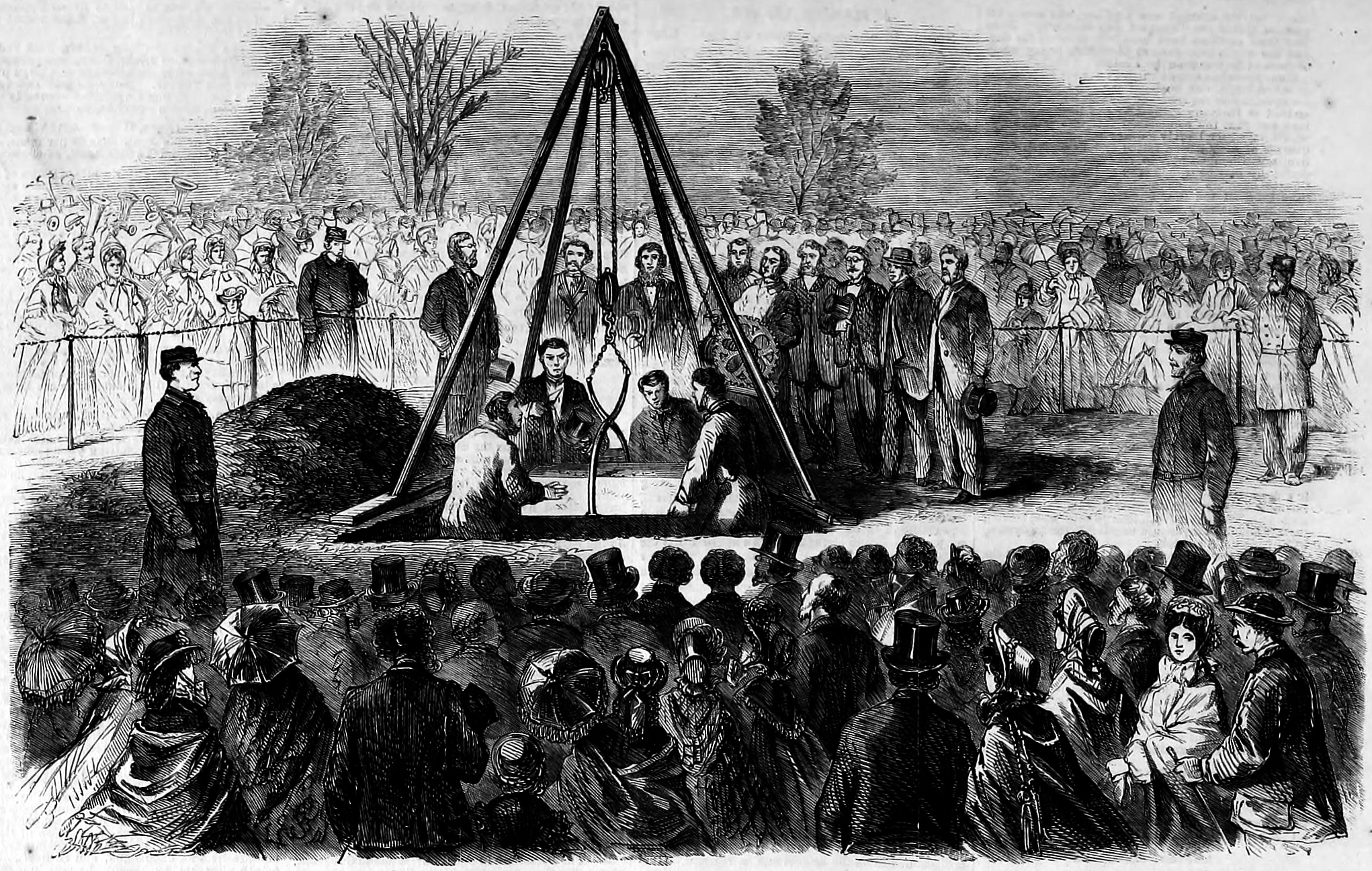
Laying the cornerstone in 1864

When the statue was unveiled, William Ross Wallace, a poet from Lexington, Kentucky, affixed a placard to the base of the statue. It read,

Old World, he is not only thine!
Our New World too has part,
As opulent and as divine,
In his stupendous mind and heart.
His monument’s for every clime!
All breasts of nature were his nurse!
So Shakespeare, with Truth’s perfect chime,
Is, in the outstretched hands of time,
The mirror of God’s universe.

The placard was immediately torn down by police.
