= 1760 in art =

Events from the year 1760 in art.

== Events ==
- 21 April – First Exhibition opens in London. Organised by the Royal Society of Arts, it was the first public exhibition of contemporary art in Britain.
- Autumn – Johann Zoffany moves to London.
- Galleria nazionale di Parma established.

== Paintings ==
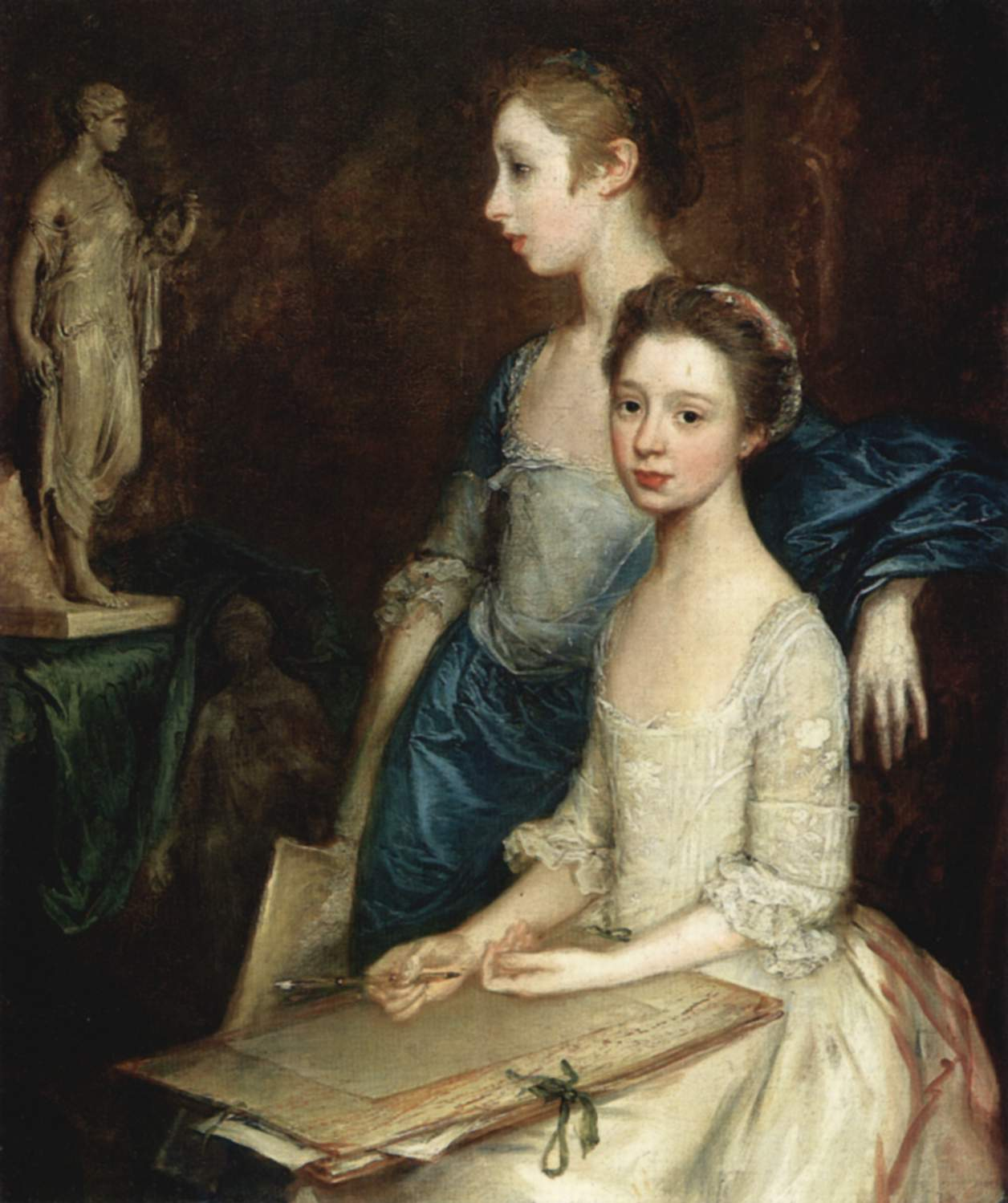
Gainsborough – The Artist`s Daughters, Molly and Peggy

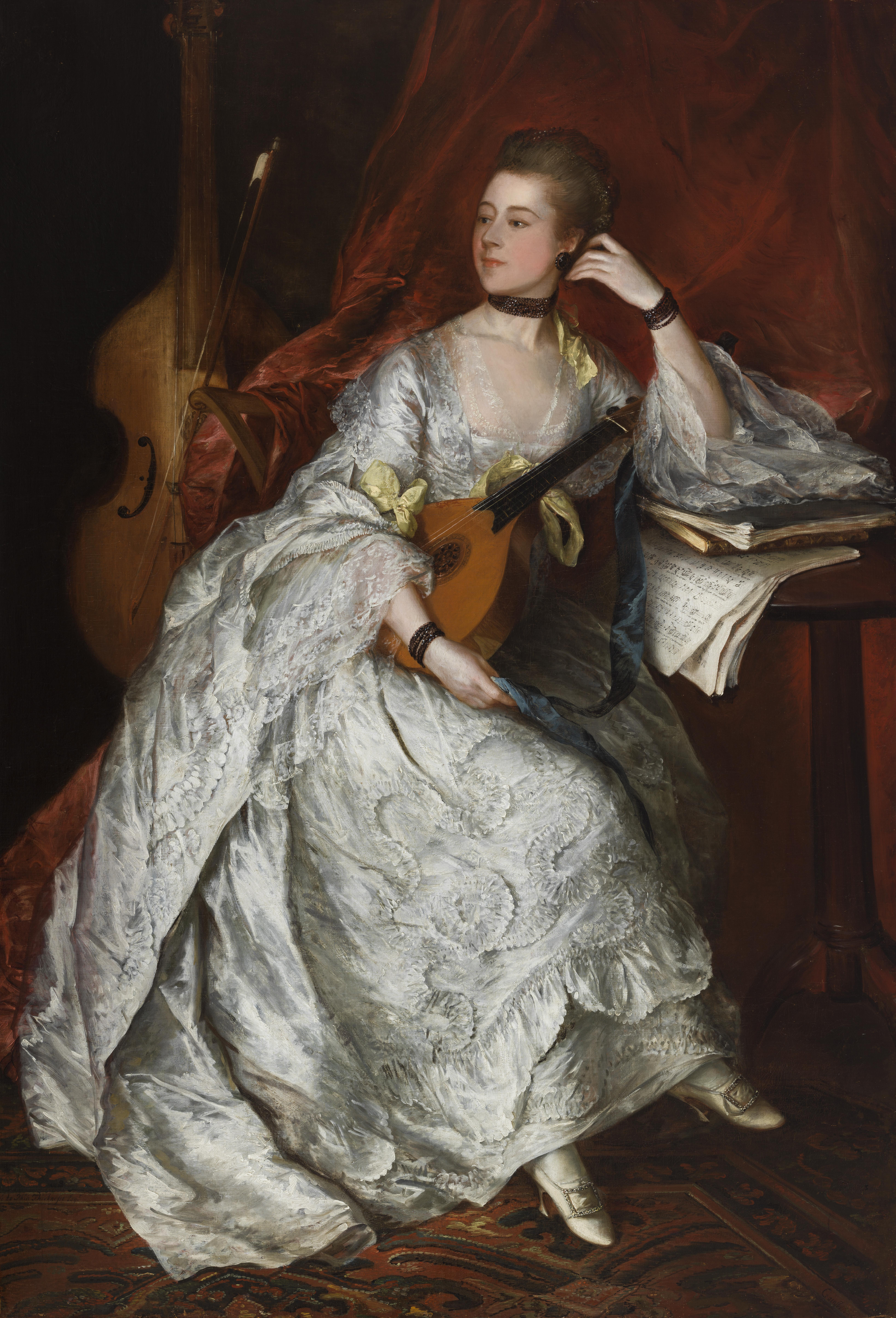
Portrait of Ann Ford by Thomas Gainsborough

- Canaletto – The Bucintoro at the Molo on Ascension Day
- Thomas Gainsborough
  - Portrait of Ann Ford
  - The Artist`s Daughters, Molly and Peggy
  - Sunset
- Tilly Kettle – Self-portrait, his first surviving painting
- Joshua Reynolds
  - Portrait of Laurence Sterne
  - Portrait of Mrs Day
- Gabriel de Saint-Aubin – A Street Show in Paris
- Richard Wilson
  - Lake Avernus and the Island of Capri
  - View on the Arno

== Births ==
- January 10 – Guillaume Guillon-Lethière, French neoclassical painter (died 1832)
- January 20 – Ferdinand Bauer, Austrian botanical illustrator (died 1826)
- March 2 – Christina Charlotta Cederström, Swedish artist, poet, and baroness (died 1832)
- March 4 – William Payne, English painter, inventor of Payne's grey (died 1830)
- March 6 – Dora Stock, portrait painter (died 1832)
- March 16 – Johann Heinrich Meyer, Swiss painter and art writer (died 1832)
- May 31 – George Garrard, English artist (died 1826)
- June 11 - Maria Cosway, Italian-English painter, engraver, composer, musician, and society hostess (died 1838)
- August 3 – Jacques Réattu, French painter and winner of the grand prix de Rome (died 1833)
- October 1 – William Thomas Beckford, art critic (died 1844)
- October 12 – Charles Paul Landon, French painter and writer on art and artists (died 1826)
- October 31? – Hokusai, Japanese artist, ukiyo-e painter and printmaker of the Edo period (died 1849)
- November 11 – Landolin Ohmacht, German sculptor (died 1834)
- December 11 - Pierre Petitot, French sculptor (died 1840)
- date unknown
  - Asensio Juliá, Spanish painter and engraver (died 1832)
  - Pierre-Antoine Bellangé, furniture designer (died 1844)
  - Giovanni Cendramini, Italian painter and engraver (died 1839)
  - Pieter Faes, Dutch painter of flowers and fruit (died 1814)
  - Luigi Frisoni, Italian painter (died 1811)
  - John Christian Rauschner, German portrait painter and sculptor (died unknown)
  - Jan Regulski, Polish glyptic artist and medalist (died 1807)
  - Jacob Schnebbelie, English illustrator and engraver (died 1792)
  - Quirinus van Amelsfoort, Dutch allegory, historical, and portrait painter (died 1820)
- probable – Lemuel Francis Abbott, English portrait painter (died 1802)

== Deaths ==
- January 23 – Giovanni Antonio Guardi, also known as Gianantonio Guardi, an Italian painter, 1756 co-founder of the Venetian Academy (born 1699)
- April 11 – Louis de Silvestre, French painter (born 1675)
- July 18 – Philip Mercier, portrait painter (born 1690)
- November 20 – Giovanni Carlo Galli-Bibiena, Italian architect/designer/painter (born 1717)
- December 21 – Philipp Hieronymus Brinckmann, German painter and engraver (born 1709)
- date unknown
  - Pierre-Alexandre Aveline, French engraver, portraitist, illustrator, and printmaker (born 1702)
  - Francesco Conti, Venetian painter (born 1681)
  - Domenico Quaglio the Elder, Italian painter (born 1723)
  - Yi Insang, Korean painter and government officer of the late Joseon period (born 1710)
  - Andrea Toresani, Italian painter and draughtsman of landscapes and portraits (born 1727)
  - Shen Quan, Chinese painter during the Qing Dynasty (born 1682)
  - Margaretha Wulfraet, Dutch painter (born 1678)
  - Yi Insang, Korean painter of the later Joseon period (born 1710)
