= 1807 in art =

Events in the year 1807 in art.

== Events ==
- Napoleon Bonaparte purchases the Borghese art collection, including a 2nd century bust, the Antinous Mondragone, and brings it to Paris, where in 1808 it is placed at the Louvre.
- William Thomas Beckford moves into Fonthill Abbey, built to house the art collection, even though construction has not finished.

== Works ==
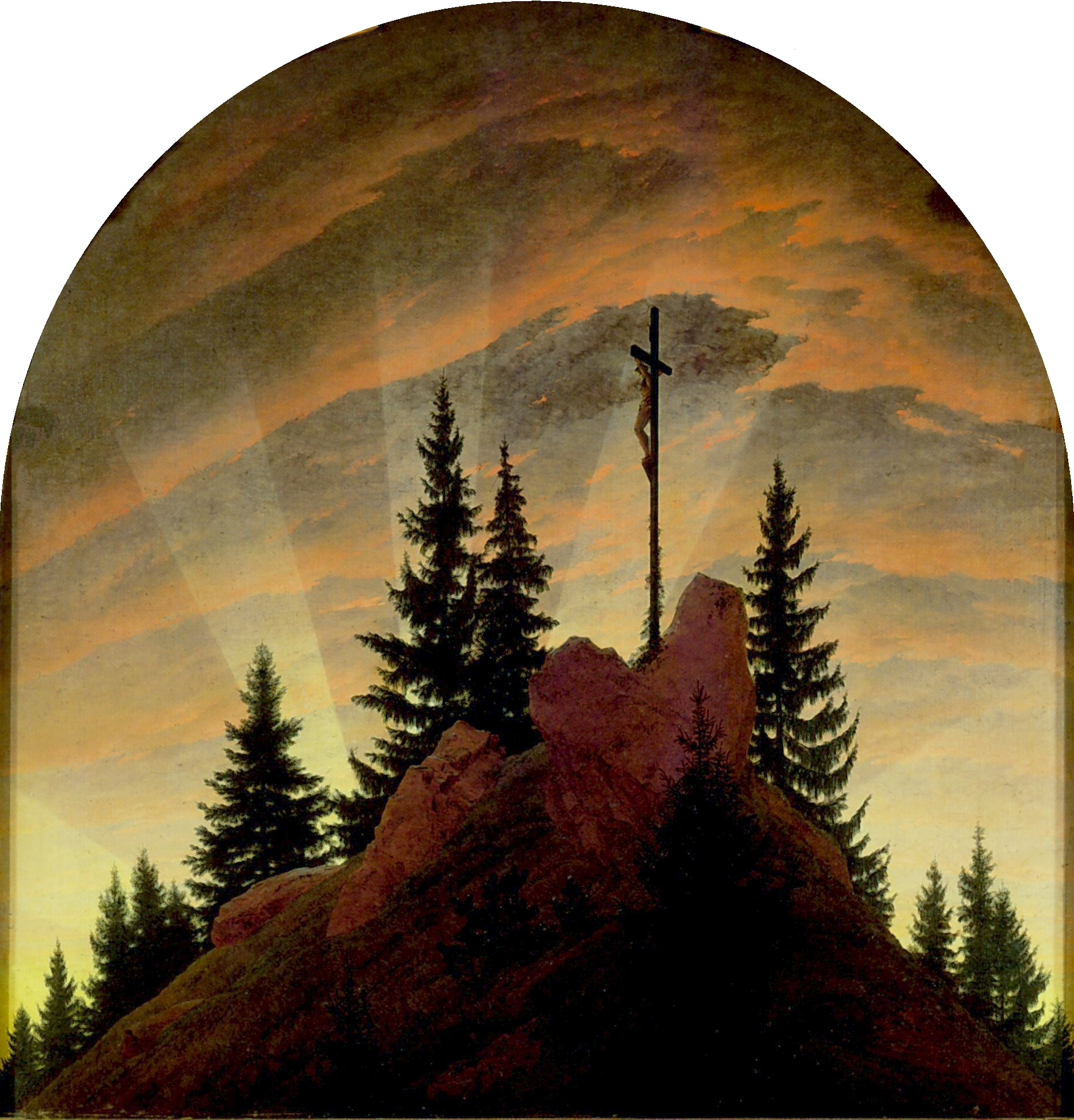
Caspar David Friedrich – Cross in the Mountains (Tetschen Altar)

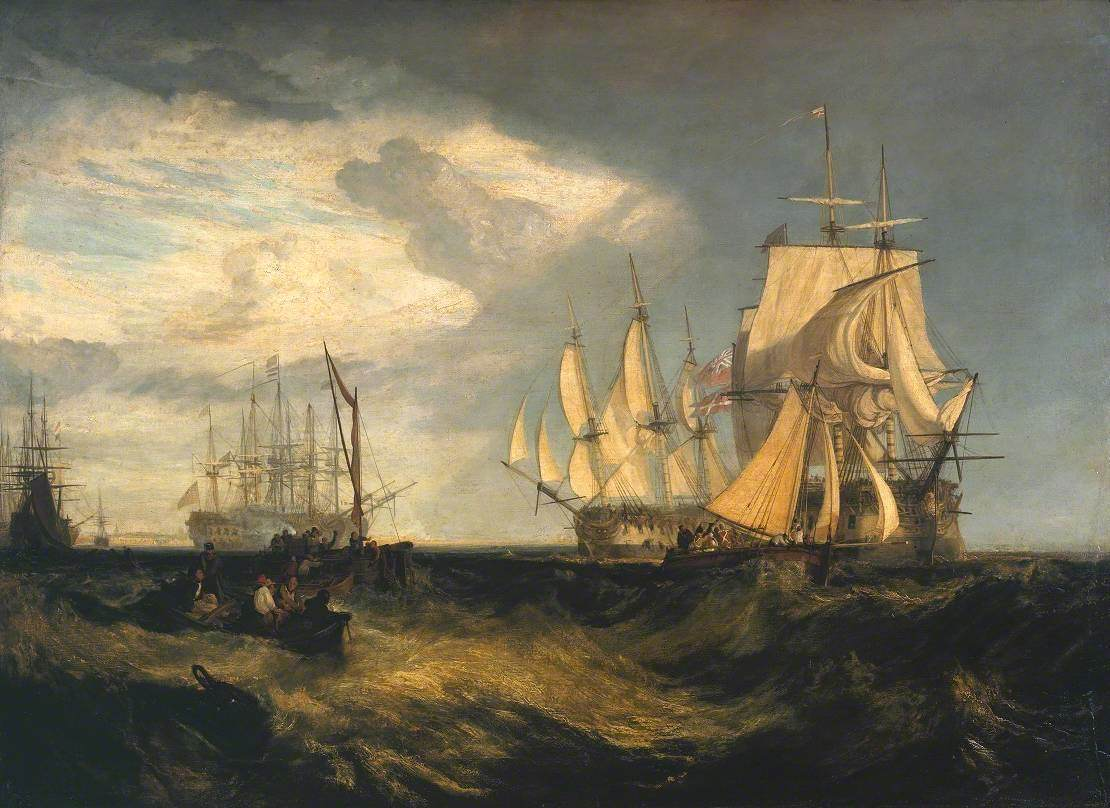
Two Captured Danish Ships Entering Portsmouth Harbour by Joseph Mallord William Turner.

- William Blake – illustrations of Paradise Lost
- Louis-Léopold Boilly
  - A Game of Billiards
  - The Reading of the Bulletin of the Grande Armée
- Augustus Wall Callcott – Market Day
- John Constable – Bow Fell, Cumberland
- Jacques-Louis David – The Coronation of Napoleon
- Arthur William Devis – The Death of Nelson, 21 October 1805
- Caspar David Friedrich
  - Cairn in Snow
  - Cross in the Mountains (Tetschen Altar)
- Angelica Kauffman – Portrait of Ludwig, Crown Prince of Bavaria
- Thomas Lawrence – Portrait of William Pitt
- Thomas Phillips – Portrait of William Blake
- Nicholas Pocock – Nelson's Flagships at Anchor
- Daniel Turner – Nelson's Funeral Procession on the Thames, 9 January 1806
- J. M. W. Turner
  - A Country Blacksmith
  - The Junction of the Thames and the Medway
  - Linlithgow Palace
  - Newark Abbey
  - Sun Rising through Vapour
  - Two Captured Danish Ships Entering Portsmouth Harbour
- John Vanderlyn – Caius Marius Amid the Ruins of Carthage
- Hendrik Voogd – Italian Landscape with Umbrella Pines
- David Wilkie – Rent Day

== Births ==
- February 4 – Max Emanuel Ainmiller, German glass painter (died 1870)
- September 10 – Friedrich Gauermann, Austrian painter (died 1862)
- September 22 – Ulisse Cambi, Italian sculptor (died 1895)
- October 5 – Constant Dutilleux, French illustrator and engraver (died 1865)
- date unknown – Jean Achard, French painter (died 1884)

== Deaths ==
- February 9 – Joseph-Benoît Suvée, Flemish painter (born 1743)
- March 8 – Sawrey Gilpin, English painter of animals (born 1733)
- April 2 – Balthasar Anton Dunker, German landscape painter and etcher (born 1746)
- April 6 – John Opie, English historical and portrait painter (born 1761)
- April 28 – Jacob Philipp Hackert, German-born landscape painter (born 1737)
- July 28 – Jan Regulski, Polish glyptic artist and medalist (born 1760)
- September 18 – Franciszek Smuglewicz, Polish draughtsman and painter (born 1745)
- November 5 – Angelica Kauffman, Swiss-Austrian painter (born 1741)
- December 6 – Niclas Lafrensen, Swedish genre and miniature painter (born 1737)
- date unknown
  - Eliphalet Chapin, American furniture designer (born 1741)
  - Nathaniel Grogan, Irish painter from Cork (born 1740)
