= Toresani =

Toresani is a surname. Notable people with the surname include:

- Andrea Toresani (c. 1727–1760), Italian painter
- Julio César Toresani (1967–2019), Argentine footballer
