= Nelson's Flagships at Anchor =

Painting by Nicholas Pocock

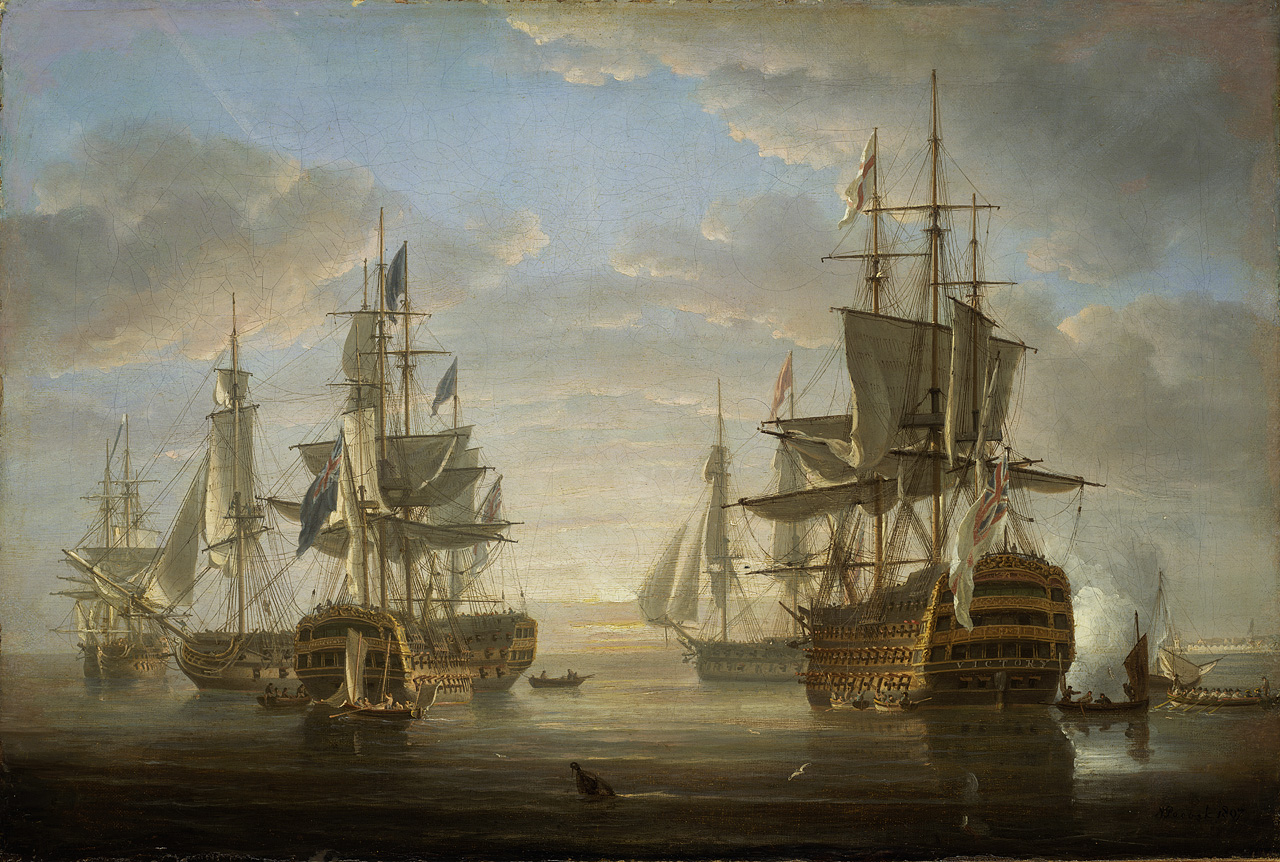
- Artist: Nicholas Pocock
- Year: 1807
- Type: Oil on canvas, maritime painting
- Dimensions: 35.6 cm × 54.6 cm (14.0 in × 21.5 in)
- Location: National Maritime Museum; London

Nelson's Flagships at Anchor is an 1807 maritime painting by the British artist Nicholas Pocock. It features composite image of five Royal Navy warships that had been used by Admiral Horatio Nelson (although despite the title on three of them had been actual flagships) during his career. From left to right they are Agamemnon, Vanguard, Elephant, Captain and Victory, onboard of which was killed in action during his victory at the Battle of Trafalgar in 1805. They are imagined together in peaceful circumstances at Spithead off Portsmouth.

It is one of six paintings produced by Pocock to provide illustrations for the biography The Life of Lord Nelson written by James Stanier Clarke and John McArthur. Today it is in the collection of the National Maritime Museum in Greenwich.

== Bibliography ==
- Spencer-Longhurst, Paul. The Sun Rising Through Vapour: Turner's Early Seascapes. Third Millennium Information, 2003.
- Tracy, Nicholas. Britannia'ss Palette: The Arts of Naval Victory. McGill-Queen's Press, 2007.
