= Still Life with Bread and Eggs =

1865 painting by Paul Cézanne

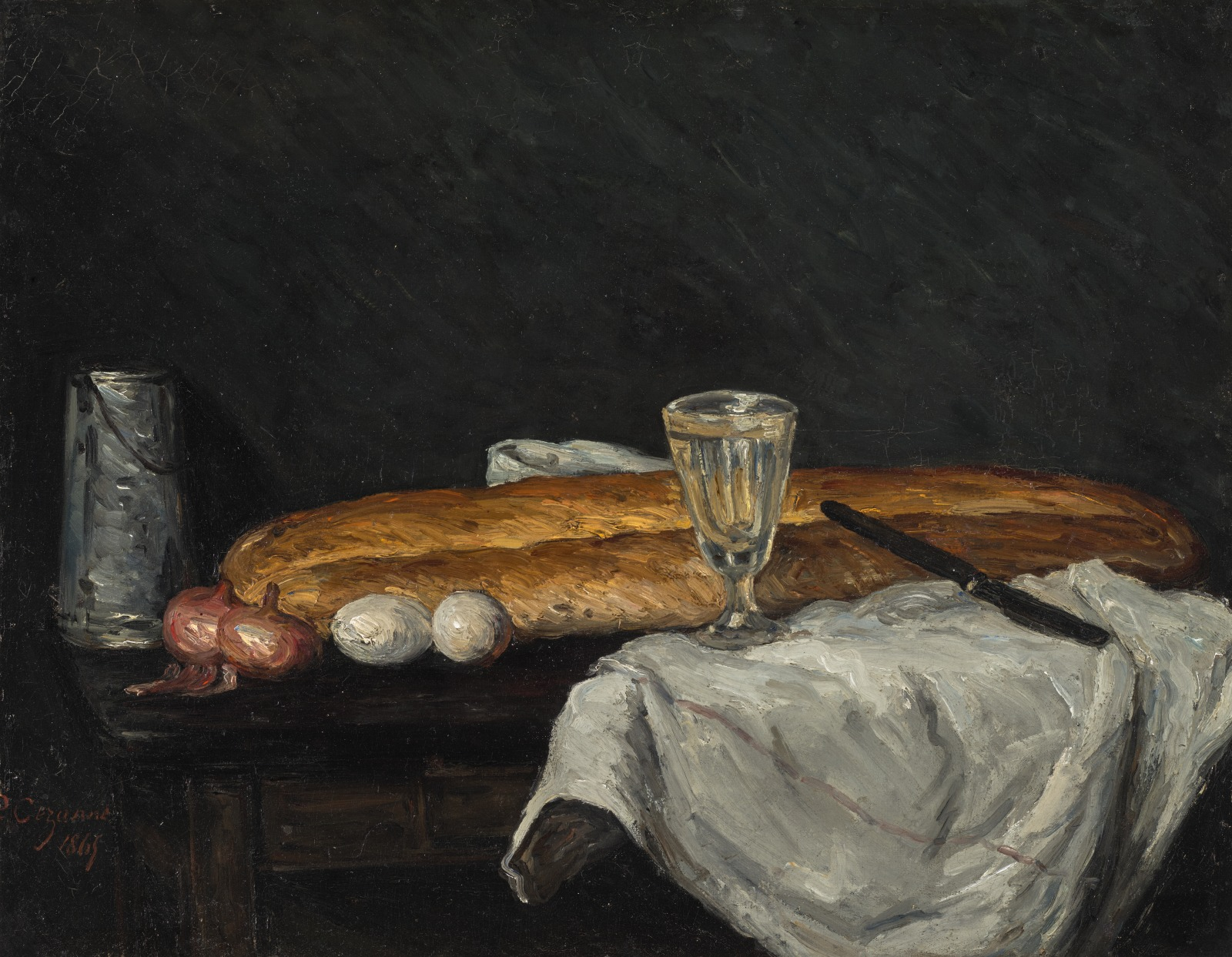
- Le pain et les oeufs
- Artist: Paul Cézanne
- Year: 1865
- Medium: Oil on canvas
- Movement: Realist
- Subject: Still life
- Dimensions: 59.1 cm × 76.2 cm (23.3 in × 30.0 in)
- Location: Cincinnati Art Museum, Cincinnati

Still Life with Bread and Eggs (French: Le pain et les oeufs) is an oil on canvas painting by the French artist Paul Cézanne, from 1865. It is held in the Cincinnati Art Museum. It is considered one of Cézanne's most important early still life paintings. In 2022 it was discovered it had been painted over an earlier portrait, possibly a self-portrait.

== Description ==
The painting, which depicts a baguette, eggs, and red onions with a pewter tankard, a knife and a wine glass on a cloth-draped tabletop, is one of Cézanne's few dated paintings. The painting is from his "dark period" and is done in a realist style, as were many of his early works before he moved into an impressionist style and then post-impressionist. In 1865 it was rejected for an exhibit at the Salon. According to Le Monde it is "one of Paul Cézanne's most important early still lifes".

== Discovery of earlier portrait ==
In 2022 a portrait was discovered beneath the still life when the museum's chief conservator, Serena Urry, removing the painting from an exhibit in which it had been included and examining it for potential maintenance requirements, noticed unusual patterns in the cracking and "on a hunch" had it x-rayed.

=== Description of earlier portrait ===
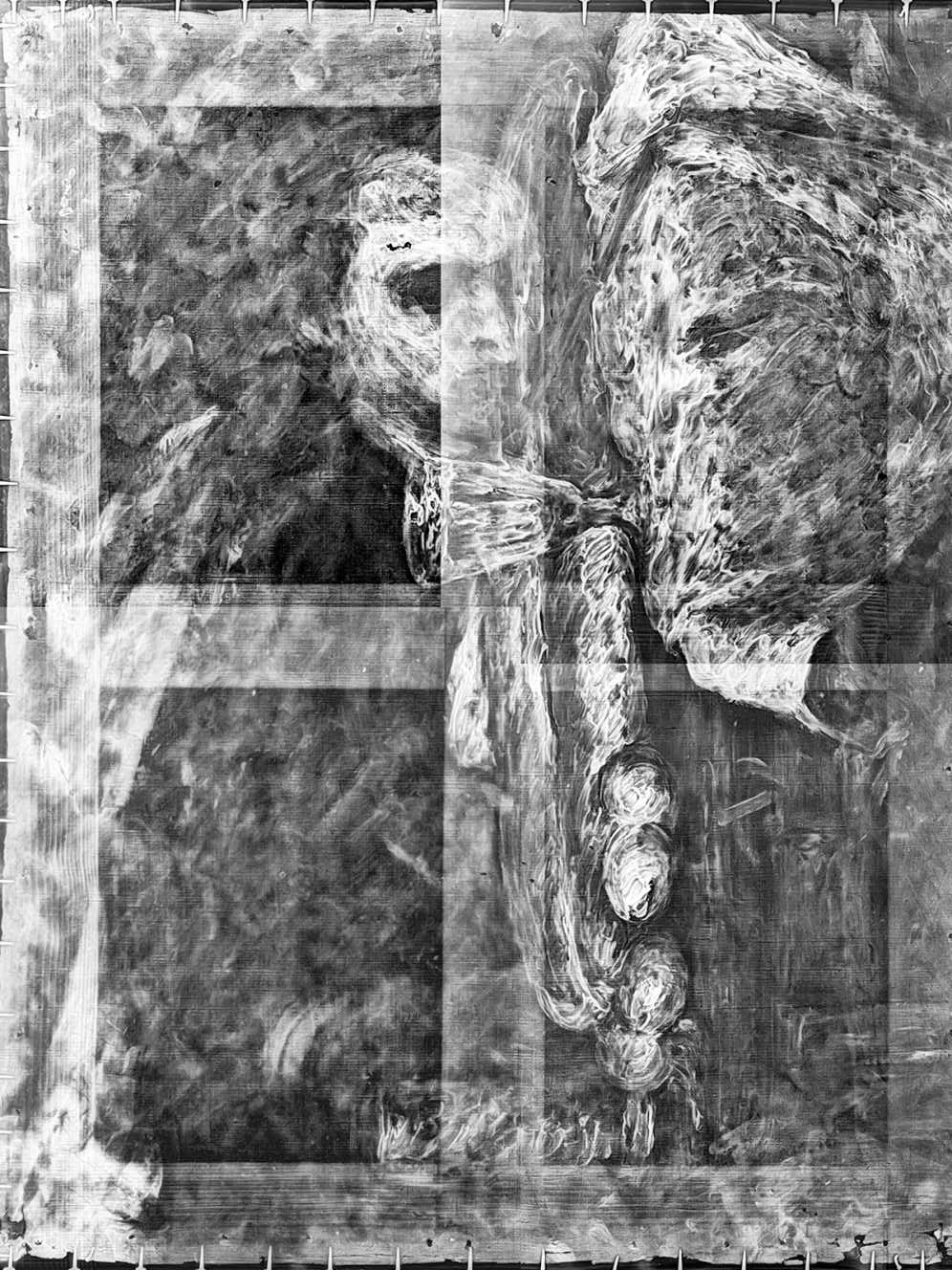
X-ray showing portrait

The portrait is rotated a quarter turn beneath the still life. The sitter is rendered in 3/4 view.

Because Cézanne dated few paintings, it is believed to be the earliest firmly dated portrait by the artist. Museum curators believe it is likely a self-portrait; if so it may also be one of the earliest depictions of the artist, who was in his 20s the year he painted the still life. Cézanne completed dozens of self-portraits, but almost all were in pencil and were created after the 1860s.

The museum as of December 2022 planned further investigation, including consulting with Cézanne experts and further imaging work such as multispectral imaging and x-ray fluorescence spectroscopy. The still life was returned to exhibit alongside an image of the portrait. It has been in the Cincinnati Art Museum's collection since 1955, when Mary E. Johnston donated it to the museum.

== See also ==
- List of paintings by Paul Cézanne
- Pentimento
