= Cincinnati Art Museum =

Art museum in Cincinnati, Ohio

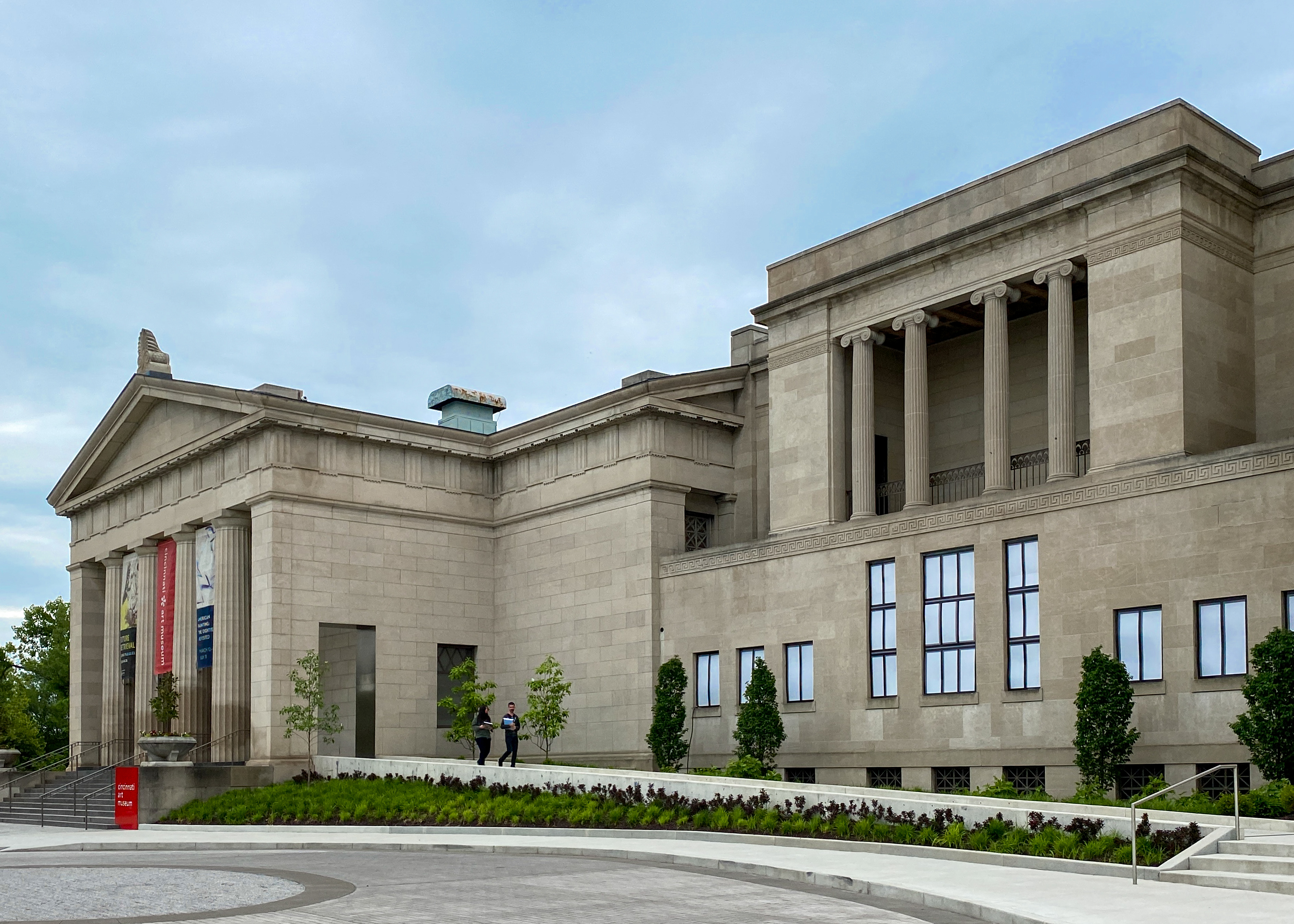
- The Cincinnati Art Museum, located on the west side of Eden Park
- Established: 1881
- Location: 953 Eden Park Dr. Cincinnati, Ohio
- Type: Art museum
- Visitors: 346,000
- Director: Cameron Kitchin
- Public transit access: SORTA Metro route 1
- Website: www.cincinnatiartmuseum.org
- Interactive map
- 39°06′50″N 84°29′49″W

The Cincinnati Art Museum is an art museum in the Eden Park neighborhood of Cincinnati, Ohio. Founded in 1881, it was the first purpose-built art museum west of the Alleghenies, and is one of the oldest in the United States. Its collection of over 73,000 works spanning 6,000 years of human history make it one of the most comprehensive collections in the Midwest.

Museum founders debated locating the museum in either Burnet Woods, Eden Park, or downtown Cincinnati on Washington Park. Charles West, the major donor of the early museum, cast his votes in favor of Eden Park sealing its final location. The Romanesque-revival building designed by Cincinnati architect James W. McLaughlin opened in 1886. A series of additions and renovations have considerably altered the building over its 140-year history.

In 2003, a major addition, The Cincinnati Wing was added to house a permanent exhibit of art created for Cincinnati or by Cincinnati artists since 1788. The Cincinnati Wing includes fifteen new galleries covering 18,000 square feet (1,700 m^{2}) of well-appointed space, and 400 objects. The Odoardo Fantacchiotti angels are two of the largest pieces in the collection. Fantacchiotti created these angels for the main altar of St. Peter in Chains Cathedral in the late 1840s. They were among the first European sculptures to come to Cincinnati. The Cincinnati Wing also contains the work of Frank Duveneck, Rookwood Pottery, Robert Scott Duncanson, Mitchell & Rammelsberg Furniture, and a tall case clock by Luman Watson.

The CAM is part of the Monuments Men and Women Museum Network, launched in 2021 by the Monuments Men Foundation for the Preservation of Art.

== History ==
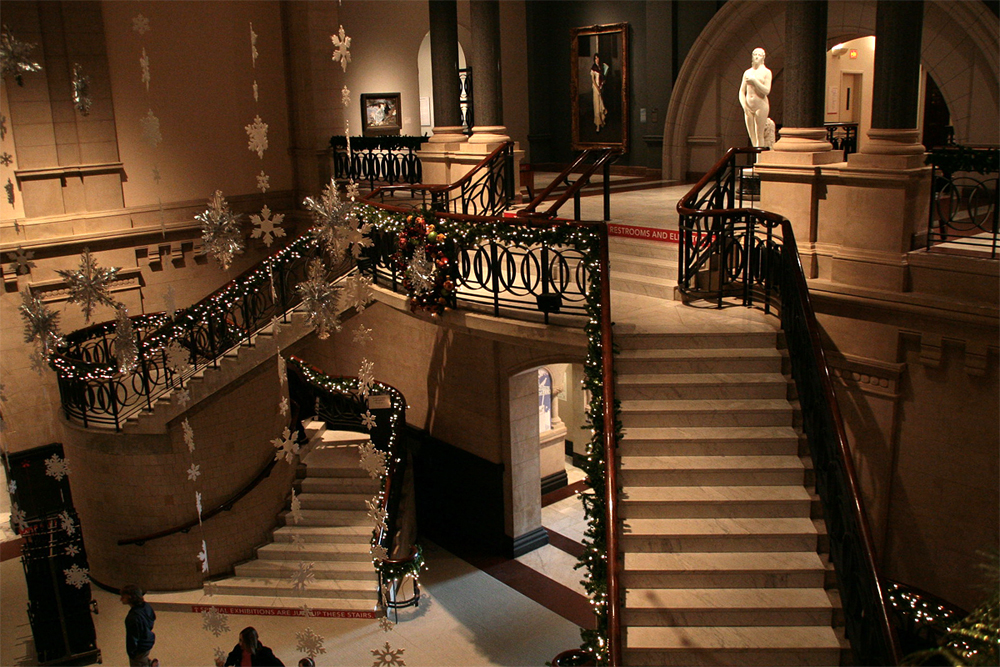
Cincinnati Art Museum interior

In the late nineteenth century, public art museums were still very much a new phenomenon, especially as far west as Cincinnati. Following the success of the 1876 Centennial Exhibition held in Philadelphia, the Women's Art Museum Association was organized in Cincinnati with the intent of bringing such an institution to the region for the benefit of all citizens. Enthusiasm for these goals grew steadily and by 1881 the Cincinnati Museum Association was incorporated. The art museum was at first temporarily housed in the south wing of Music Hall in Over-the-Rhine. Just five years later, or on May 17, 1886, the Art Museum building in Eden Park was dedicated with elaborate ceremonies. In November 1887, the McMicken School relocated to the newly built museum campus and was renamed the Art Academy of Cincinnati.

The Cincinnati Art Museum enjoyed the support of the community from the beginning. Generous donations from a number of prominent Cincinnatians, including Melville E. Ingalls, grew the collection to number in the tens of thousands of objects, which soon necessitated the addition of the first of several Art Museum expansions.

In 1907 the Schmidlapp Wing, designed by Daniel Burnham, opened, which was followed by a series of building projects. The addition of the Emery (named after Cincinnati philanthropists Thomas J. Emery and his wife Mary Emery), Hanna and French wings in the 1930s enclosed the courtyard and gave the Art Museum its current rectangular shape and provided the space in which the American, European and Asian collections are currently shown.

Renovations during the late 1940s and early 1950s divided the Great Hall into two floors and the present main entrance to the Art Museum was established. The 1965 completion of the Adams-Emery wing added space for the permanent collection, lecture halls and temporary exhibition galleries.

In 1993, a $13 million project restored the grandeur of the Art Museum's interior architecture and uncovered long-hidden architectural details. This project included the renovation of one of the Art Museum's signature spaces, the Great Hall. In addition, new gallery space was created and lighting and climate control were improved. The Art Museum's temporary exhibition space was expanded to approximately 10,000 square feet (930 m^{2}) to accommodate major temporary exhibitions. In 1998, the museum's board decided to separate the museum from the Art Academy of Cincinnati.

By the turn of the twenty-first century, the Art Museum's collection numbered over 60,000 objects and, today, is the largest in the state of Ohio. In 2003, the Cincinnati Art Museum deepened its ties with the Greater Cincinnati community by opening the popular and expansive Cincinnati Wing, the first permanent display of a city's art history in the nation. In addition, on May 17, 2003, the Art Museum eliminated its general admission fee forever, made possible by The Lois and Richard Rosenthal Foundation. In 2005, the Art Academy of Cincinnati officially left the museum's Eden Park campus, relocating to Over-the-Rhine.

As of June 2020, the Cincinnati Art Museum and Cincinnati Playhouse in the Park, were both undergoing major renovations, including a new outdoor civic and art space titled "Art Climb". Art Climb includes a staircase from the sidewalk near the intersection of Eden Park Drive and Gilbert Avenue leading to the art museum entrance. Consisting of multiple flights of steps, Art Climb opens up the museum grounds, connects the museum to its neighbors, and provides a space to incorporate outdoor artworks.

== Collection ==
The art museum has paintings by several European masters, including: Master of San Baudelio, Jorge Ingles, Sandro Botticelli (Judith with Head of Holofernes), Matteo di Giovanni, Domenico Tintoretto (Portrait of Venetian dux Marino Grimani), Mattia Preti, Bernardo Strozzi, Frans Hals, Bartolomé Esteban Murillo (St. Thomas of Villanueva), Peter Paul Rubens (Samson and Delilah) and Aert van der Neer. The collection also includes works by Jean-Baptiste-Camille Corot, Pierre-Auguste Renoir, Camille Pissarro, Claude Monet (Rocks At Belle Isle), Vincent van Gogh, and Pablo Picasso. The museum also has a large collection of paintings by American painter Frank Duveneck (Elizabeth B. Duveneck).

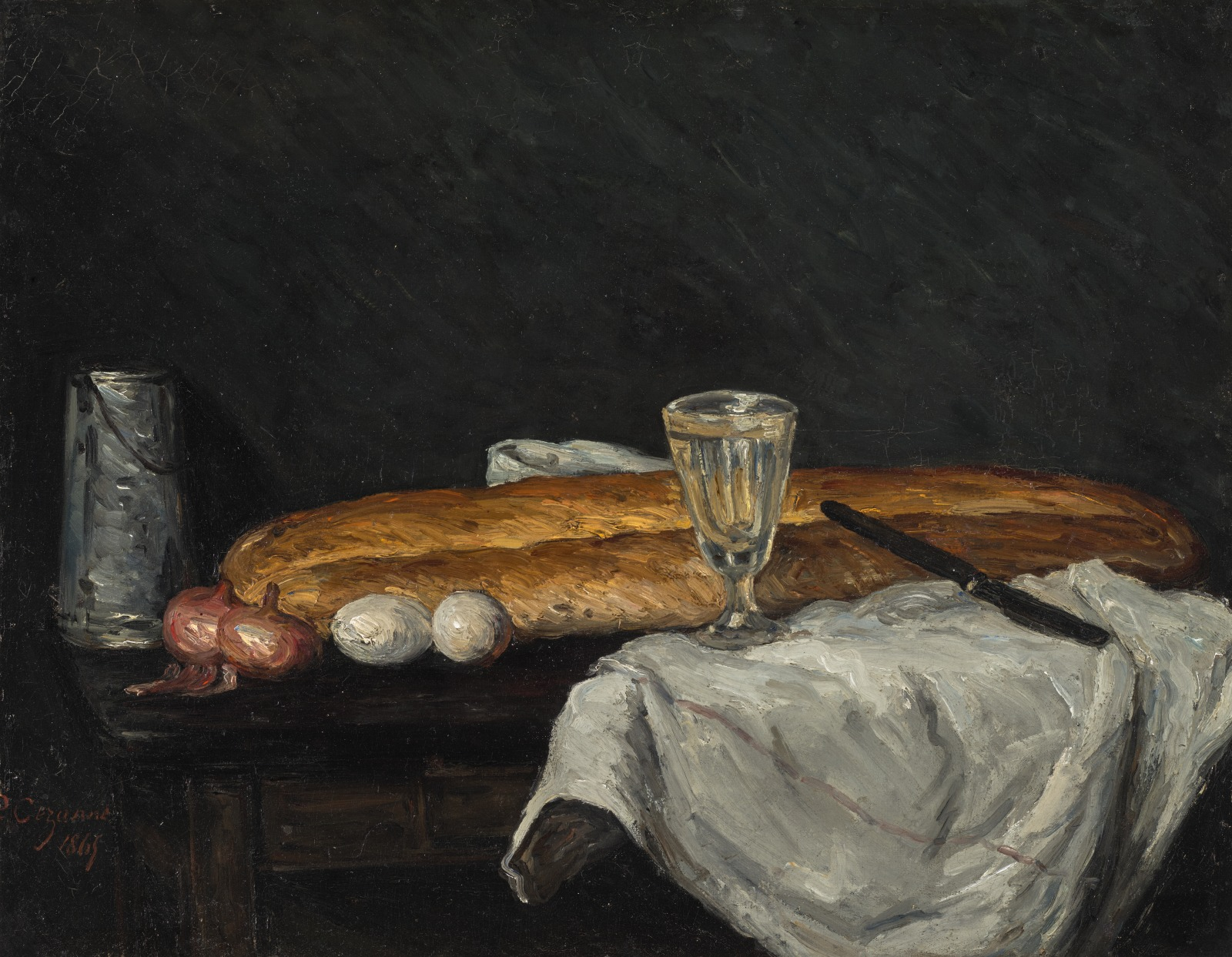
Le pain et les oeufs

In 2022 the museum discovered a portrait beneath Paul Cézanne's 1865 Still Life with Bread and Eggs when its chief conservator, Serena Urry, removing the painting from an exhibit in which it had been included and examining it for potential maintenance requirements, noticed unusual patterns in the cracking and "on a hunch" had it x-rayed.

The museum's Decorative Arts and Design collection includes over 7,000 works, including works by Paul de Lamerie, Karen LaMonte, Kitaro Shirayamadani, Jean-Pierre Latz, and many more.

== Selections from the permanent collection ==
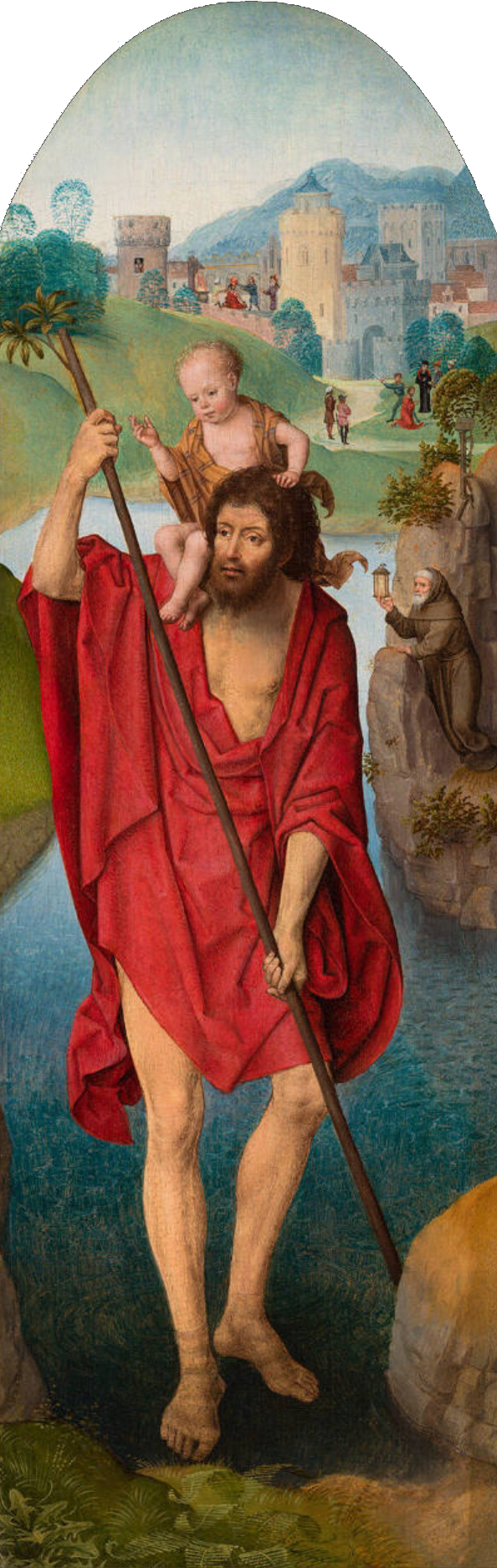
Hans Memling
Saint Christopher (1433-1494)

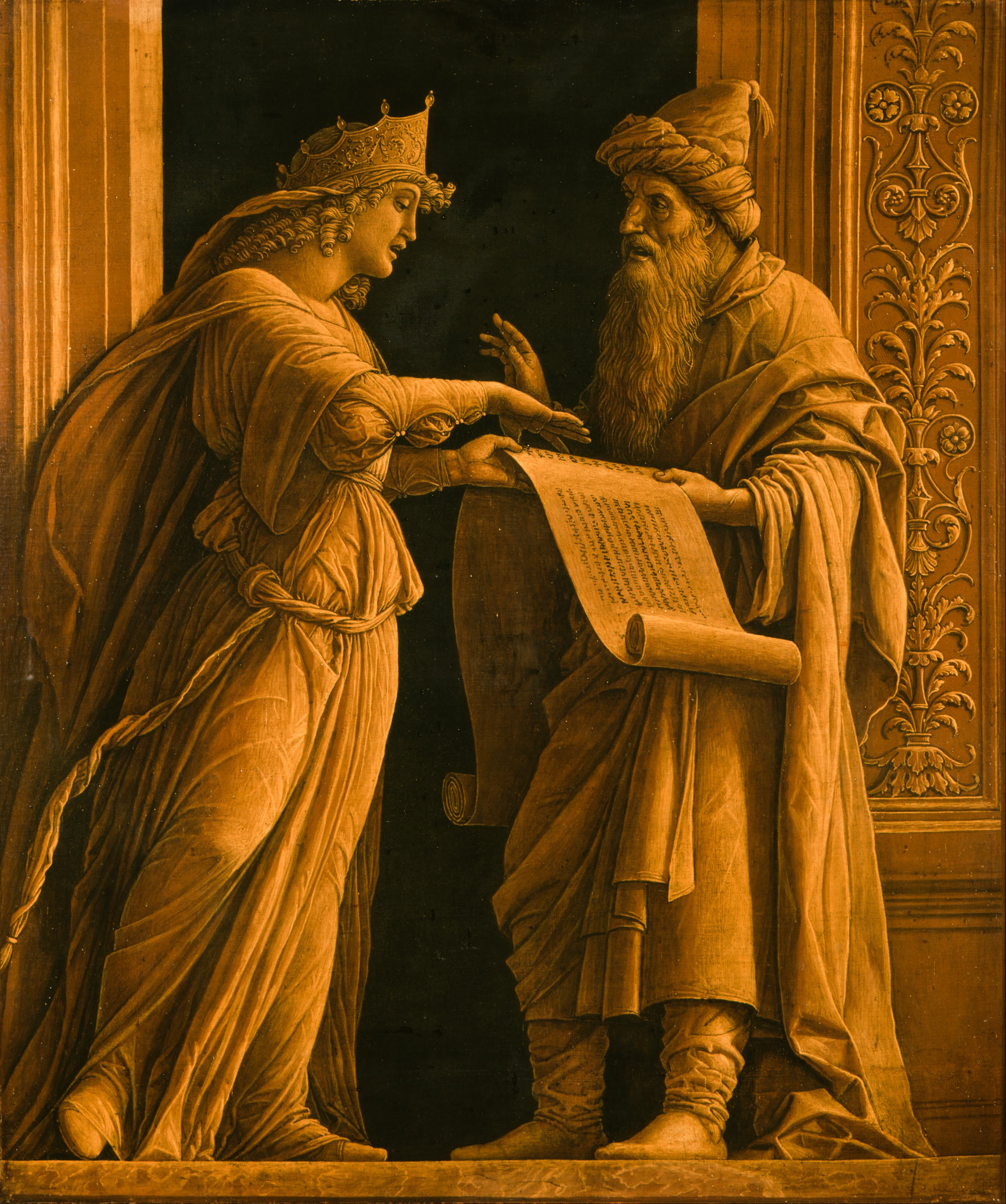
Andrea Mantegna
A Sibyl and a Prophet (1495-1500)

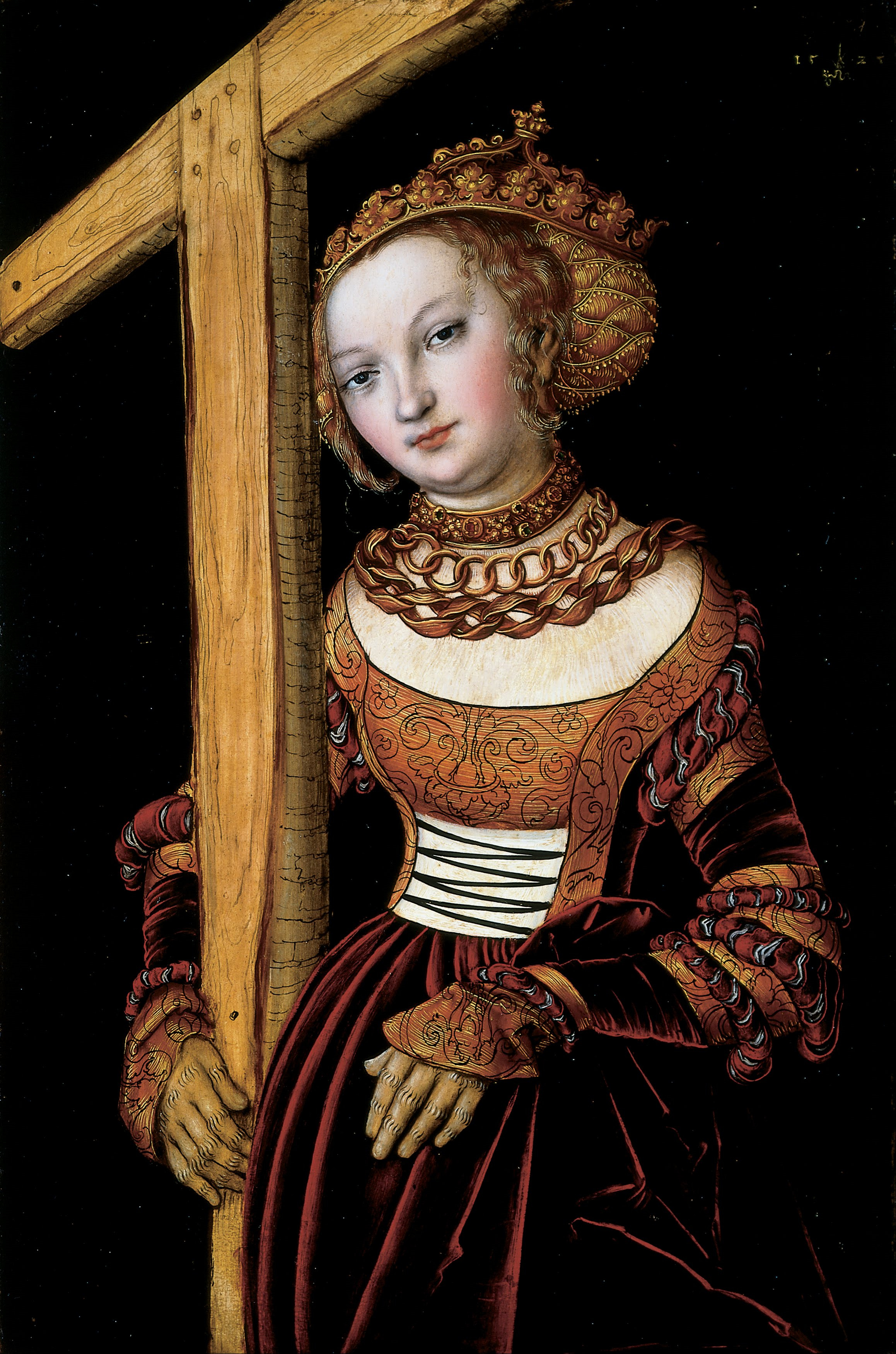
Lucas Cranach the Elder
Saint Helena with the Cross (1525)

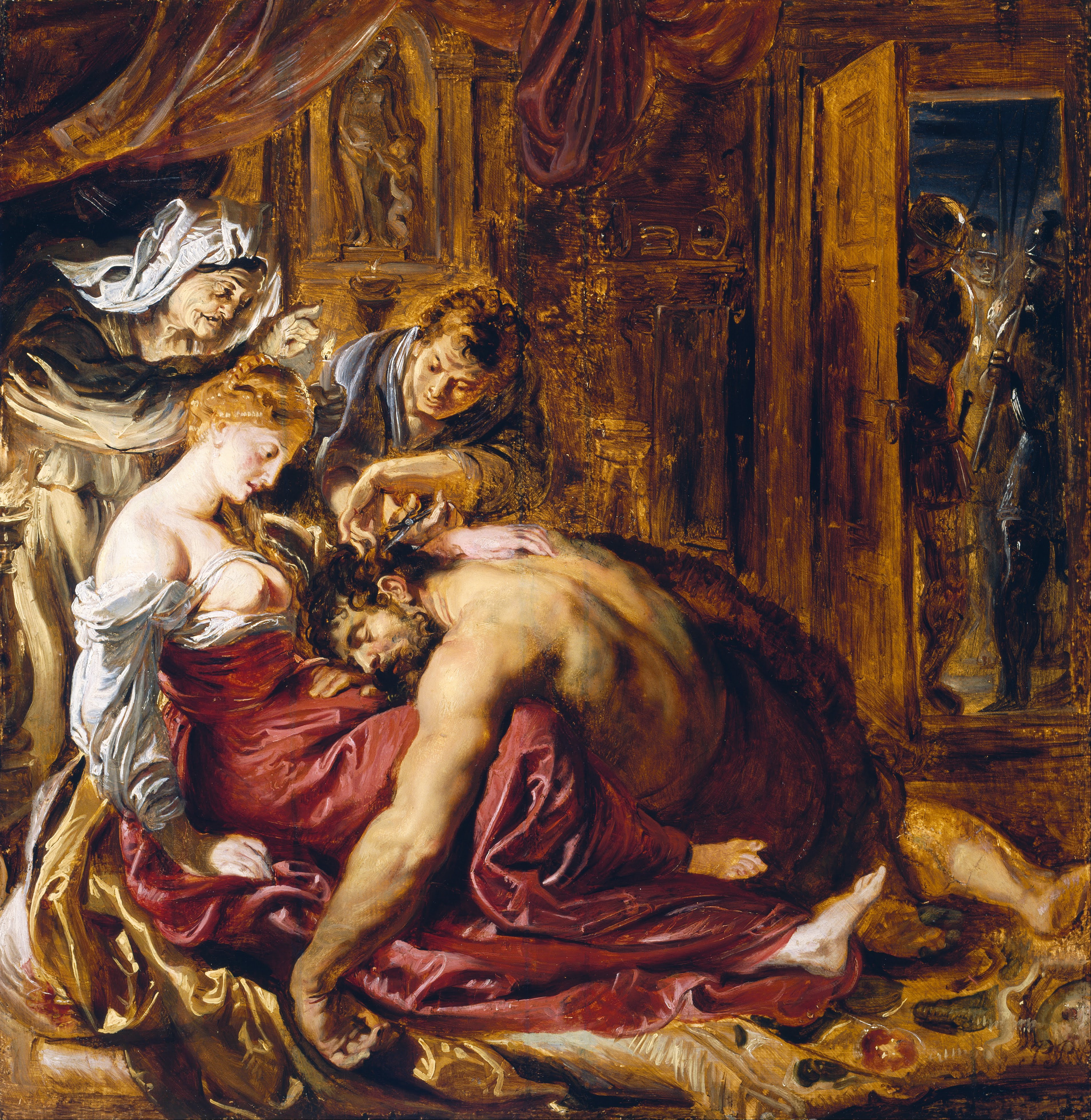
Peter Paul Rubens
Samson and Delilah (1604-1614)

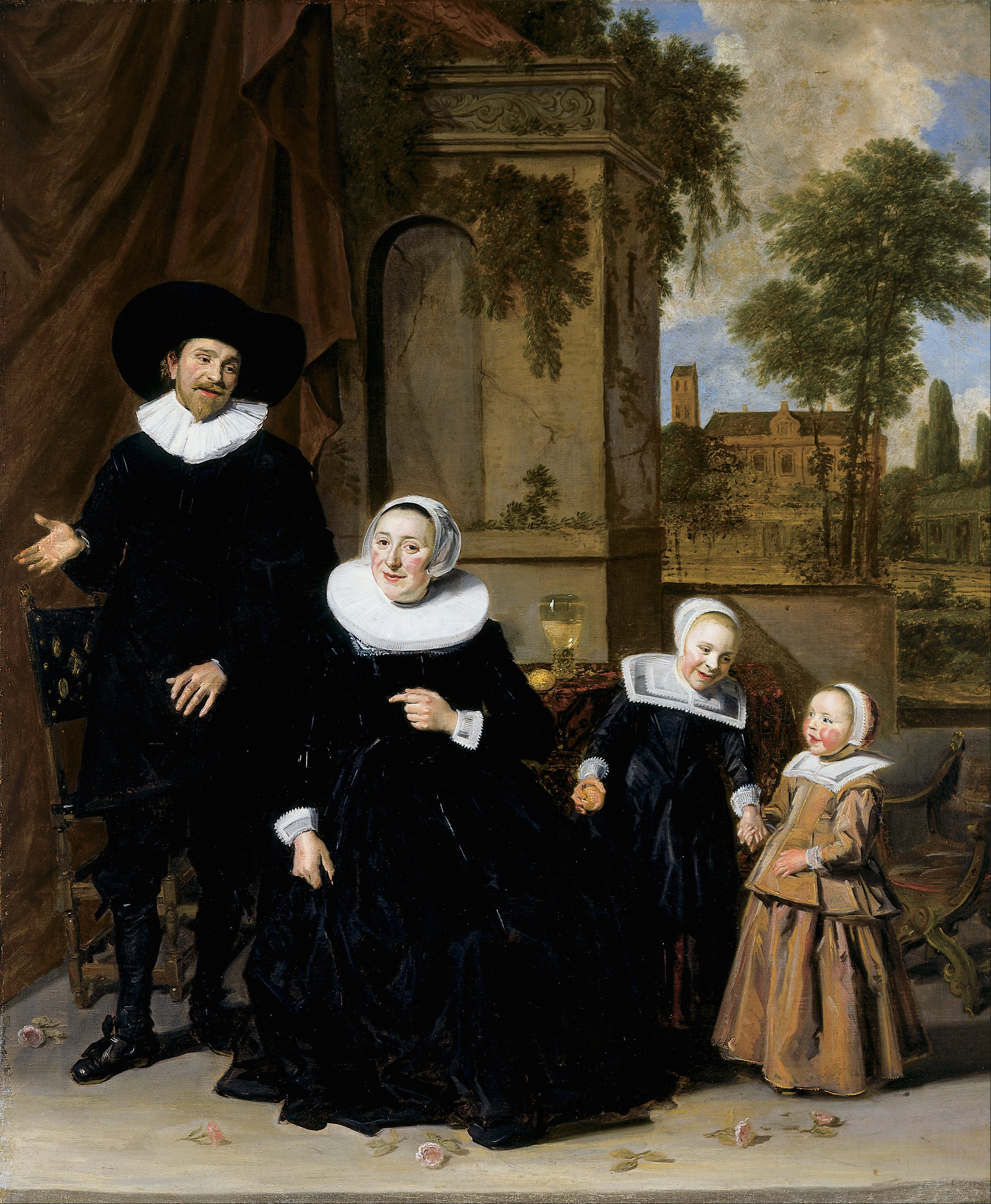
Frans Hals
Portrait of a Dutch Family (1633-1636)

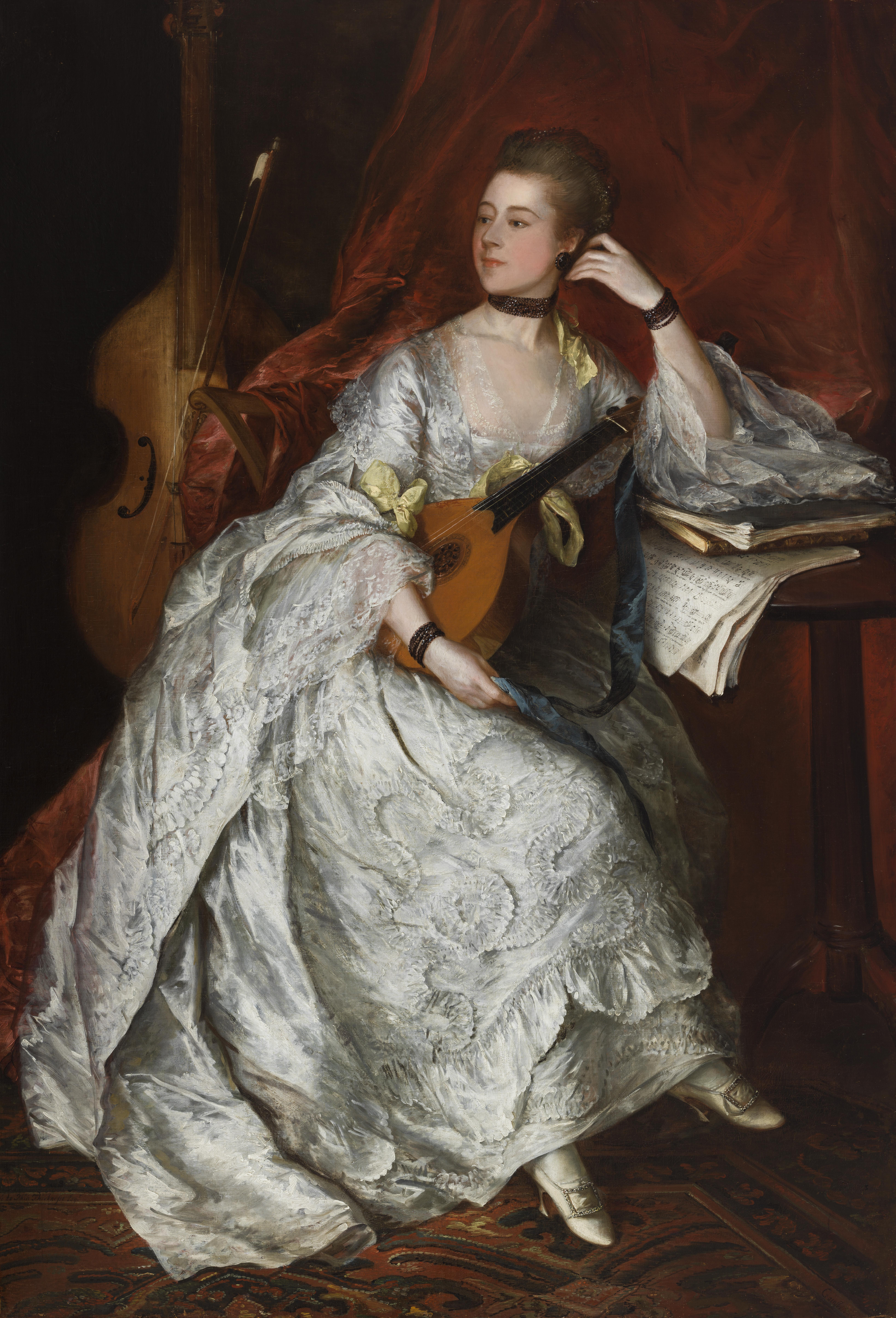
Thomas Gainsborough
Portrait of Ann Ford (1760)

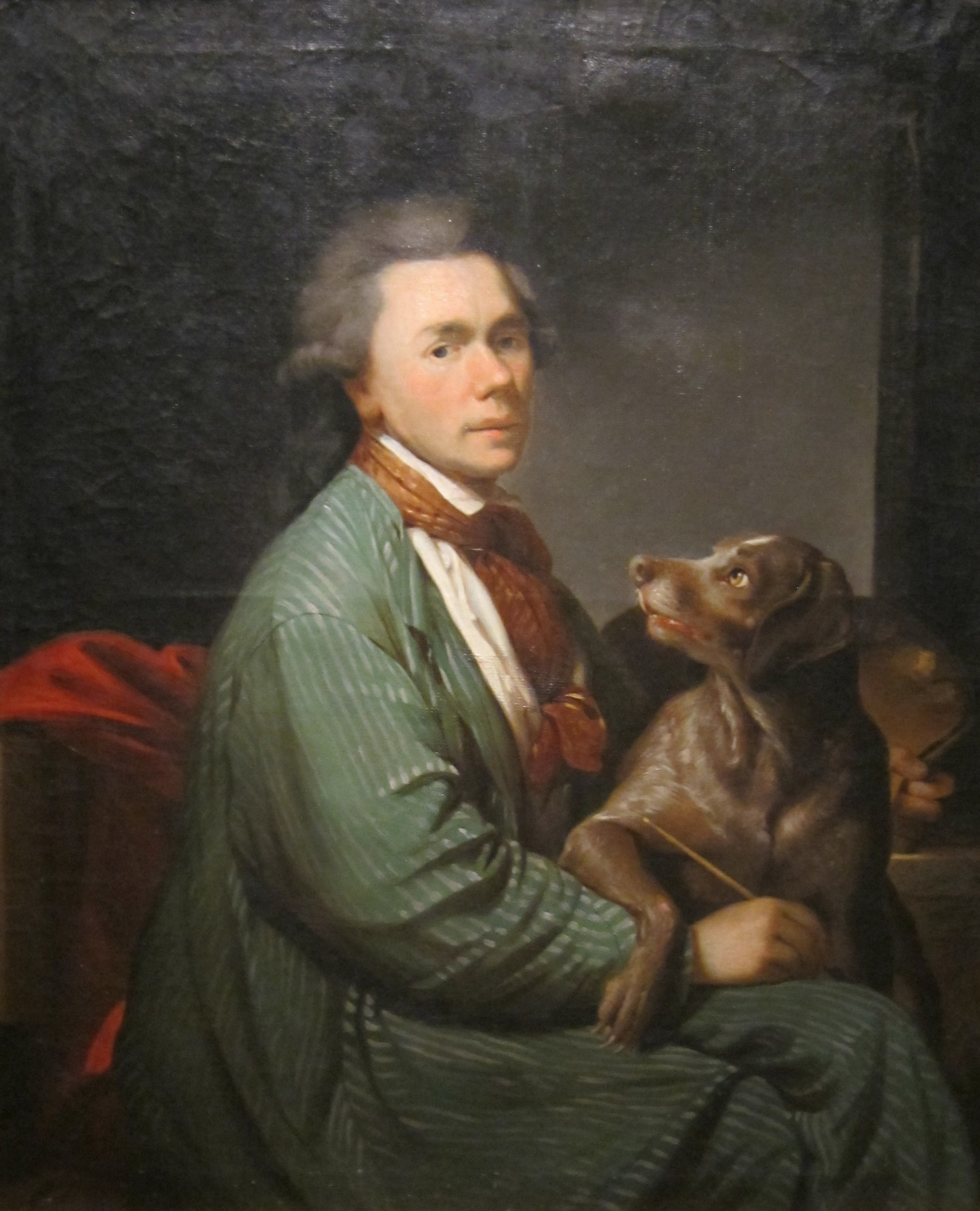
Martin Ferdinand Quadal
Self-portrait (1788)

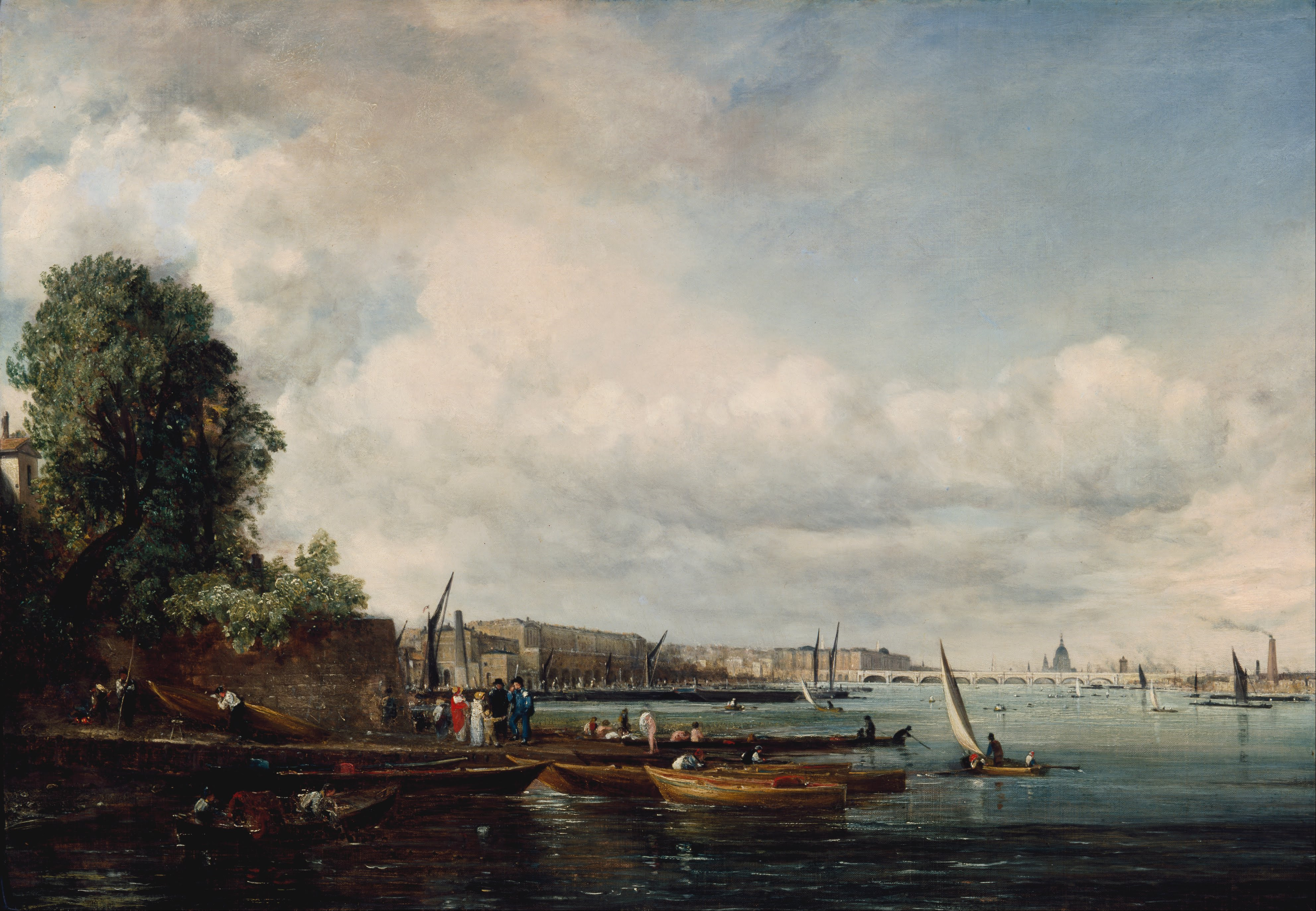
John Constable
Waterloo Bridge (1820)

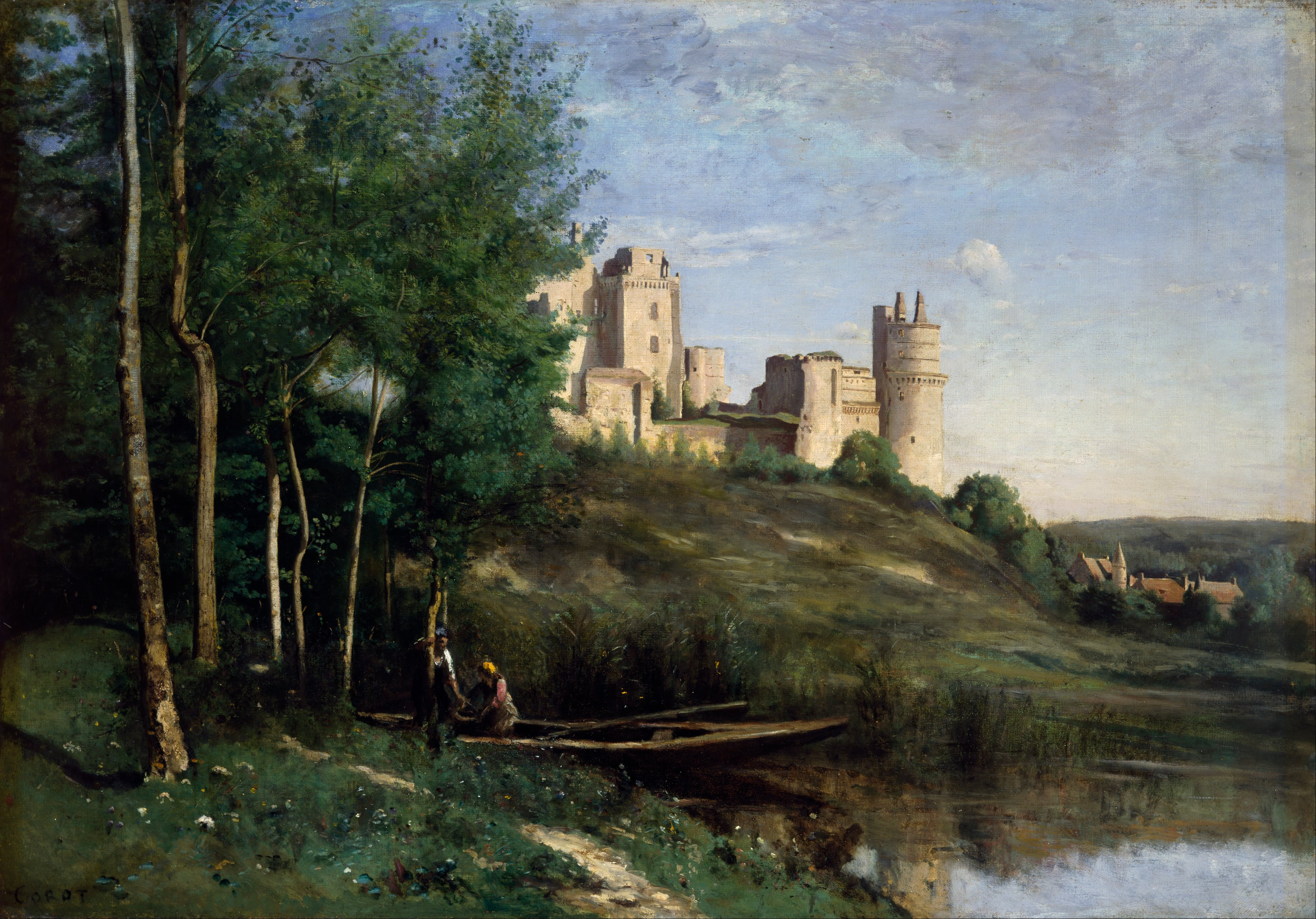
Jean-Baptiste-Camille Corot
Ruins of the Château de Pierrefonds (1825-1872)

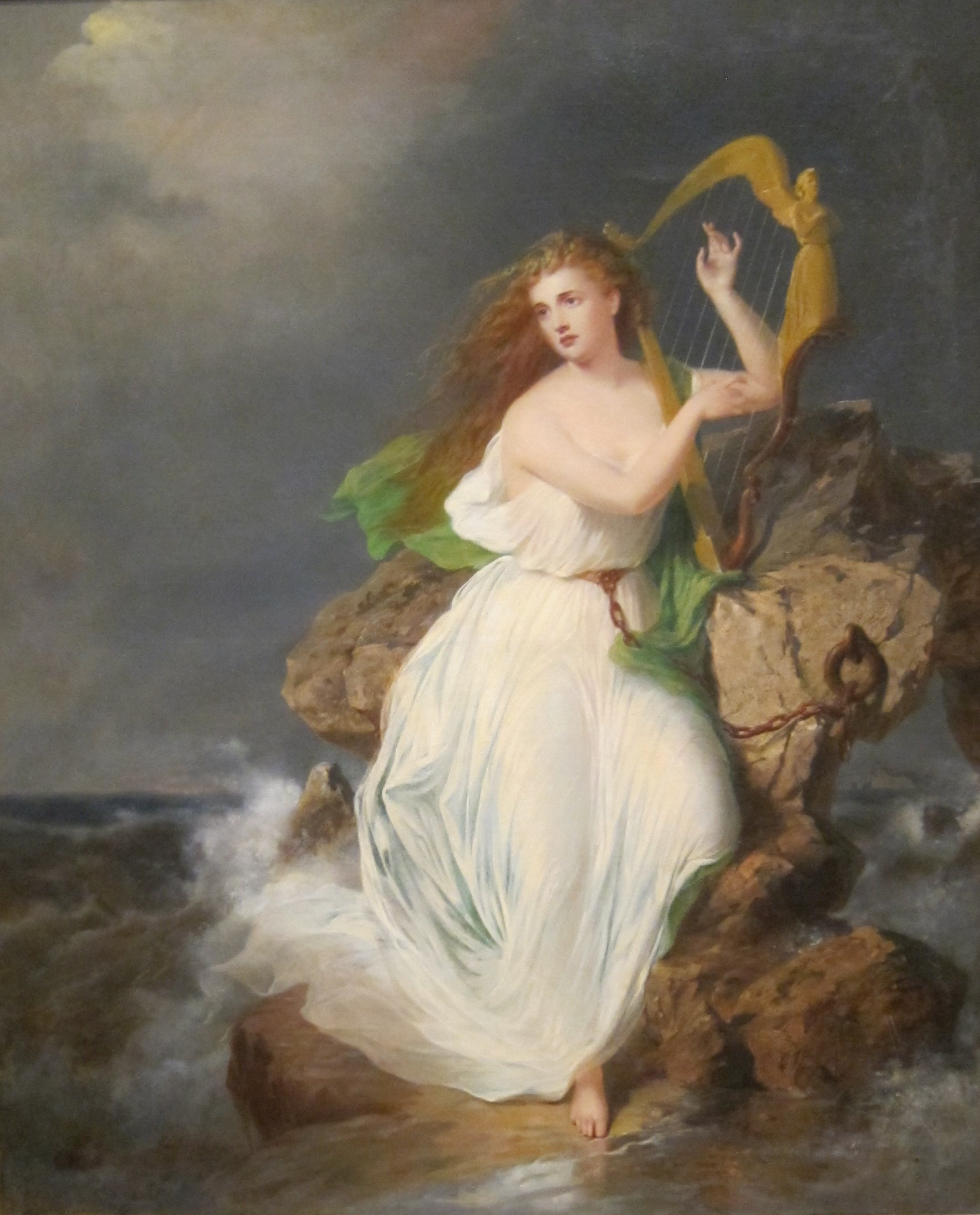
Thomas Buchanan Read,
The Harp of Erin (1867)

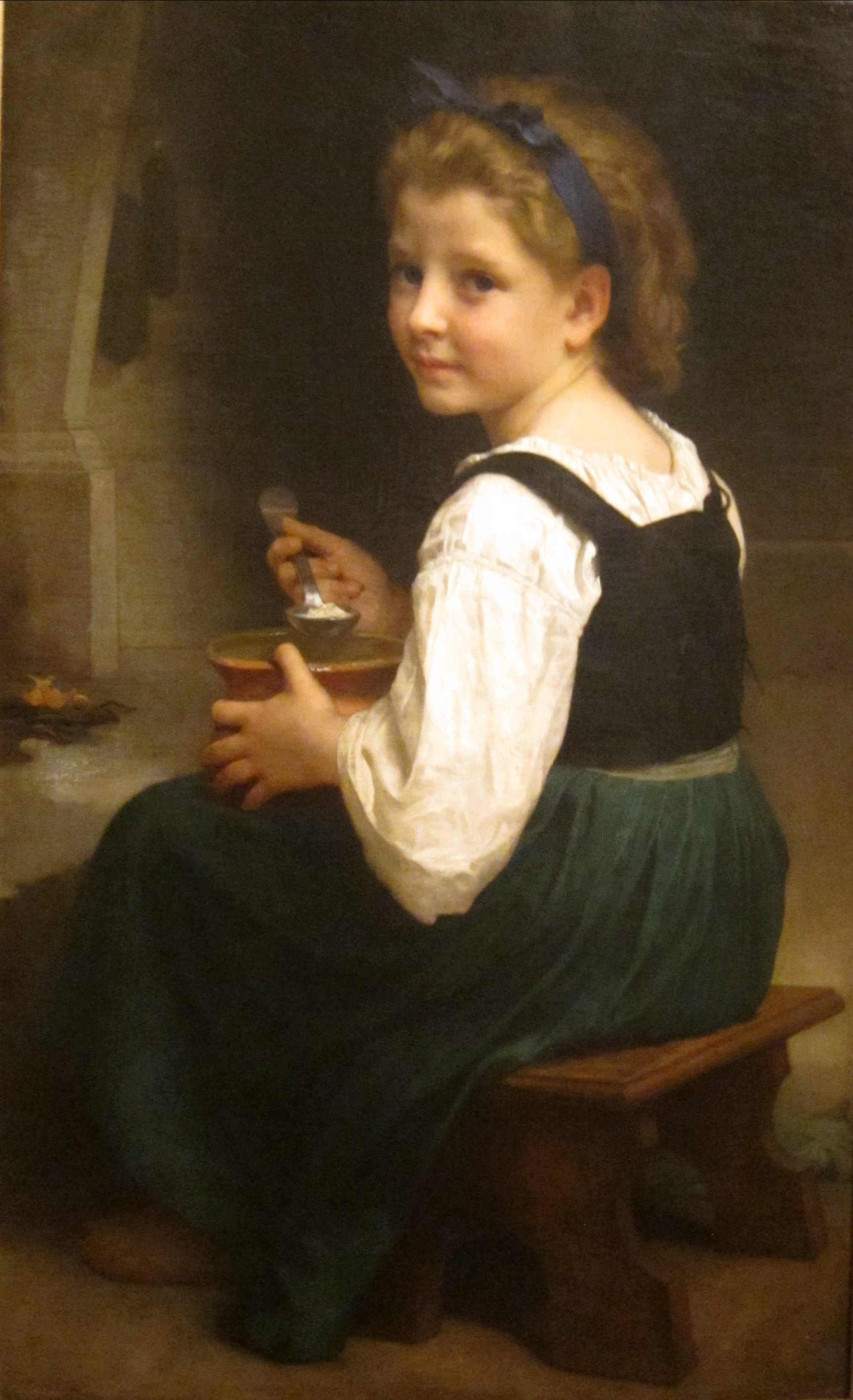
William Adolphe Bouguereau
Girl Eating Porridge (1874)

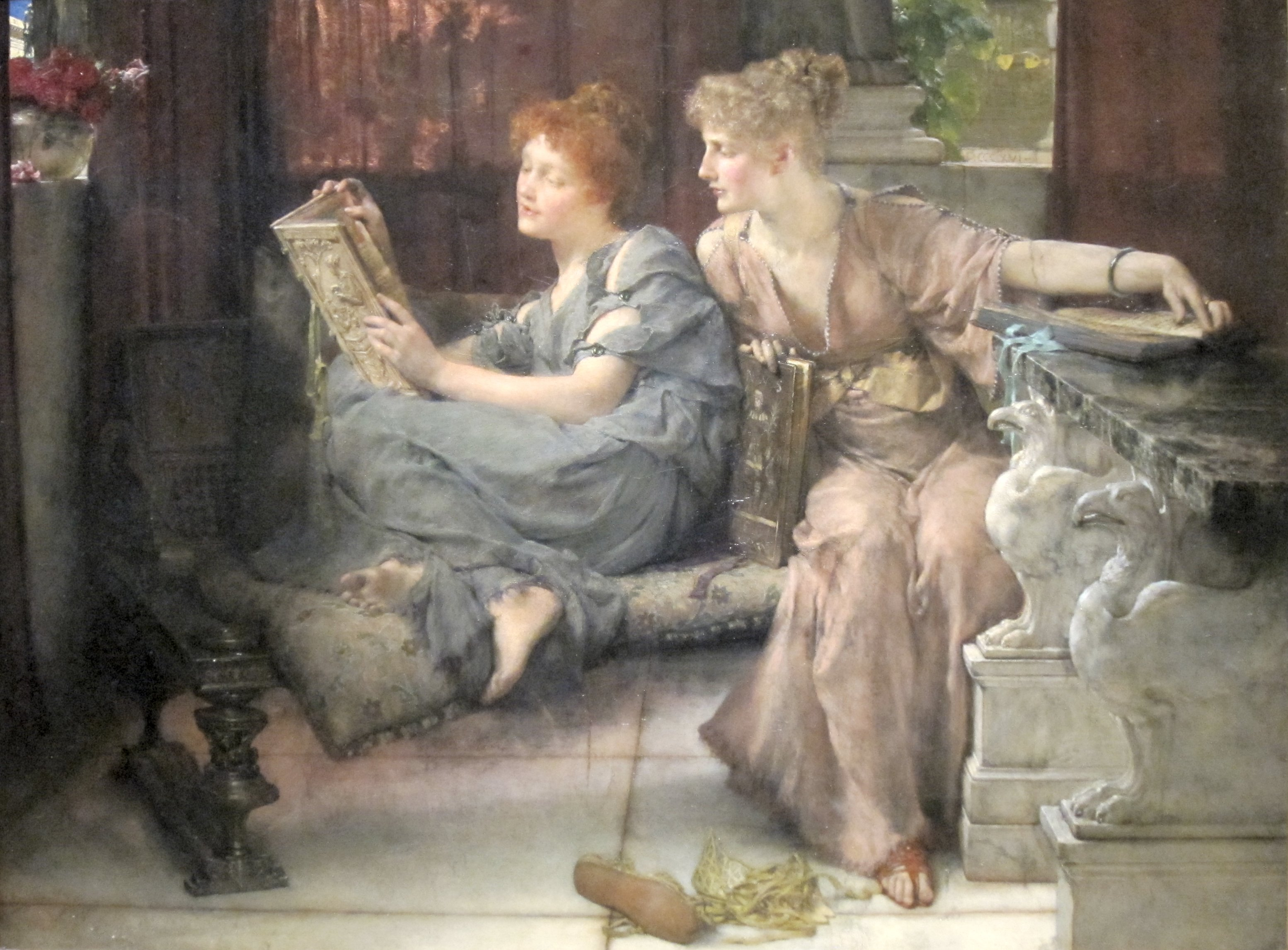
Lawrence Alma-Tadema
Comparison (1892)

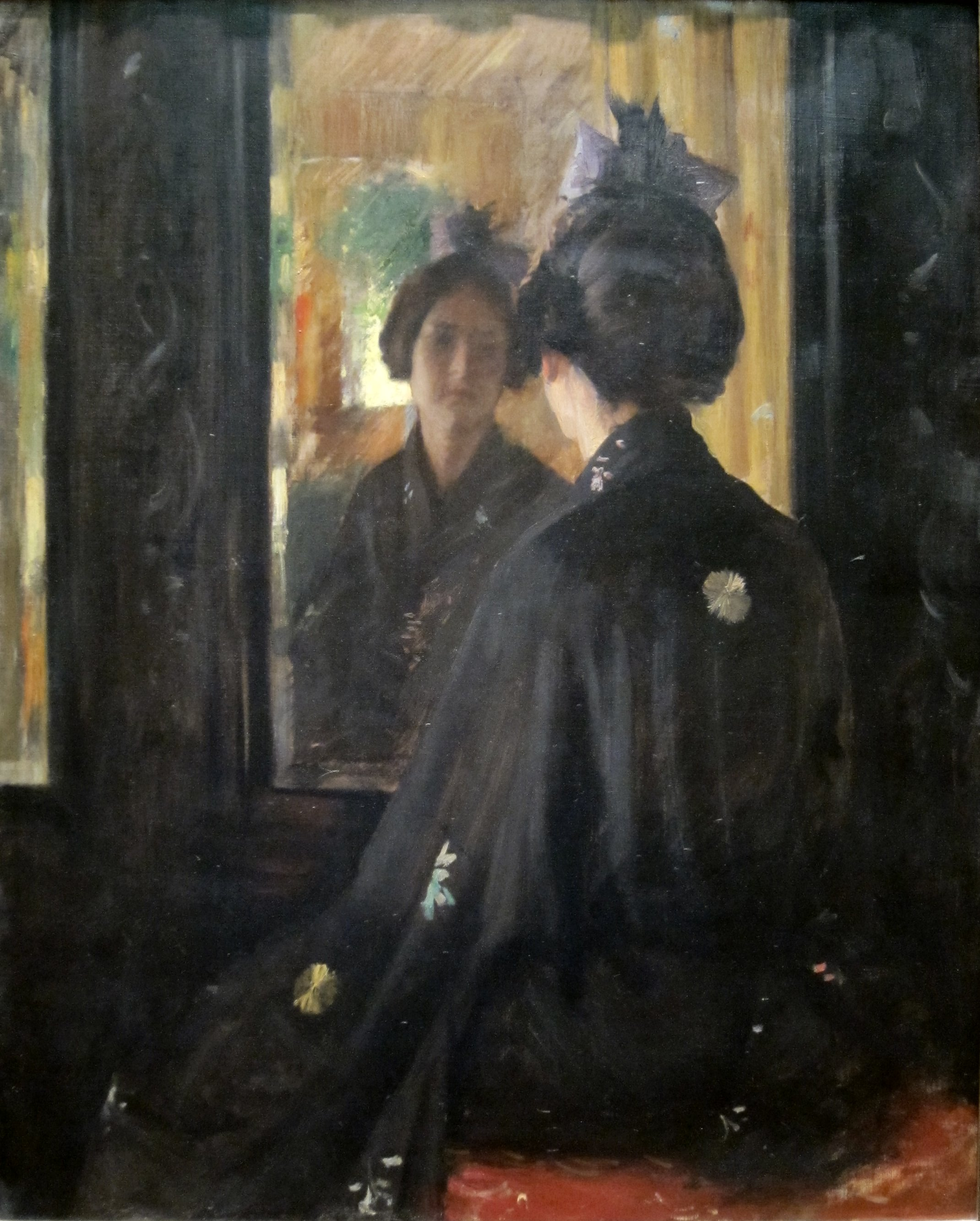
William Merritt Chase
The Mirror (circa 1900)

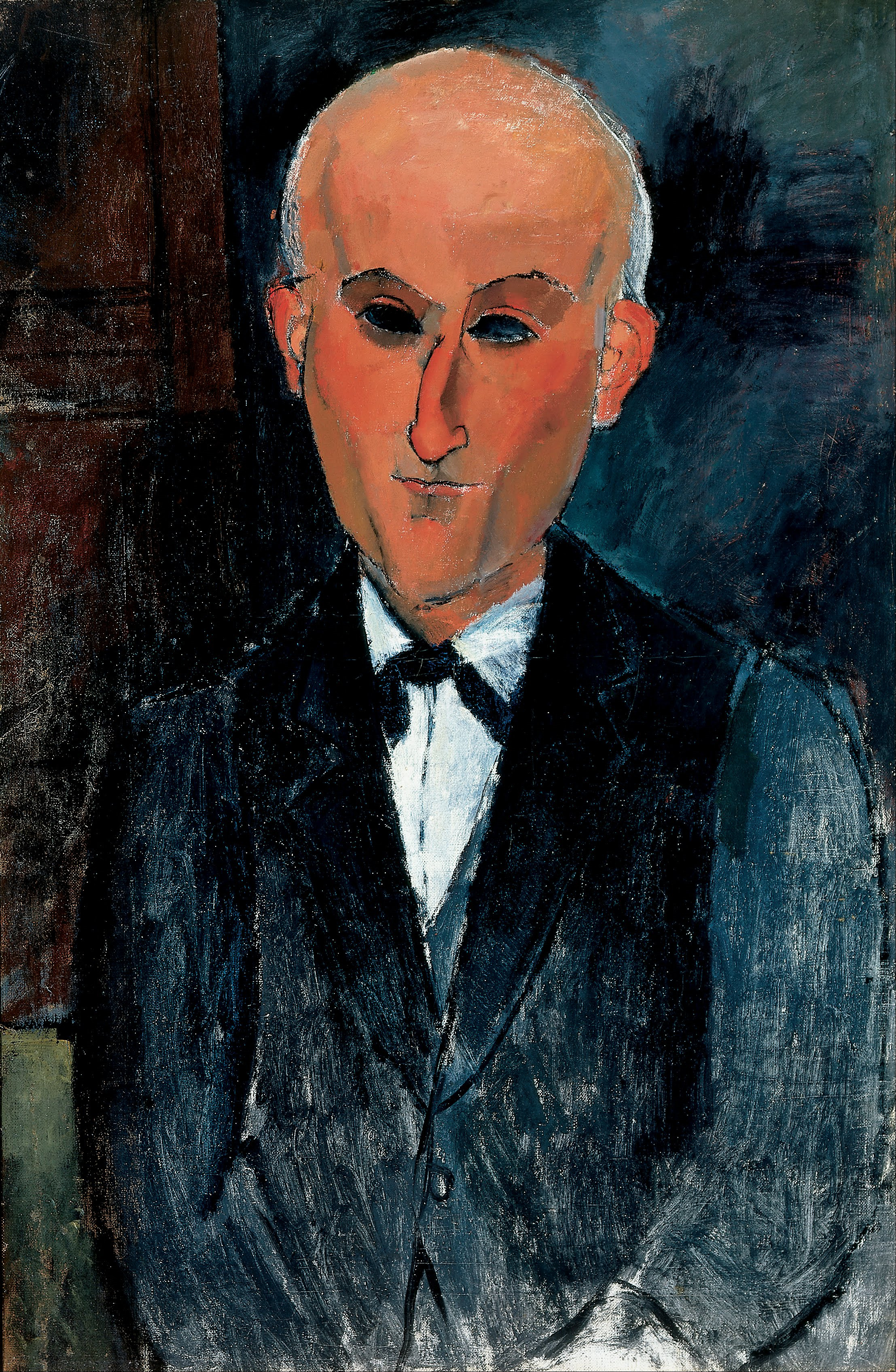
Amedeo Modigliani
Portrait of Max Jacob (1911-1921)

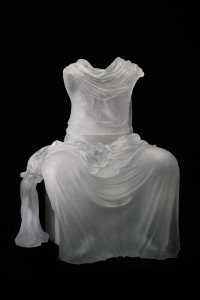
Karen LaMonte, Seated Dress Impression with Drapery, 2005

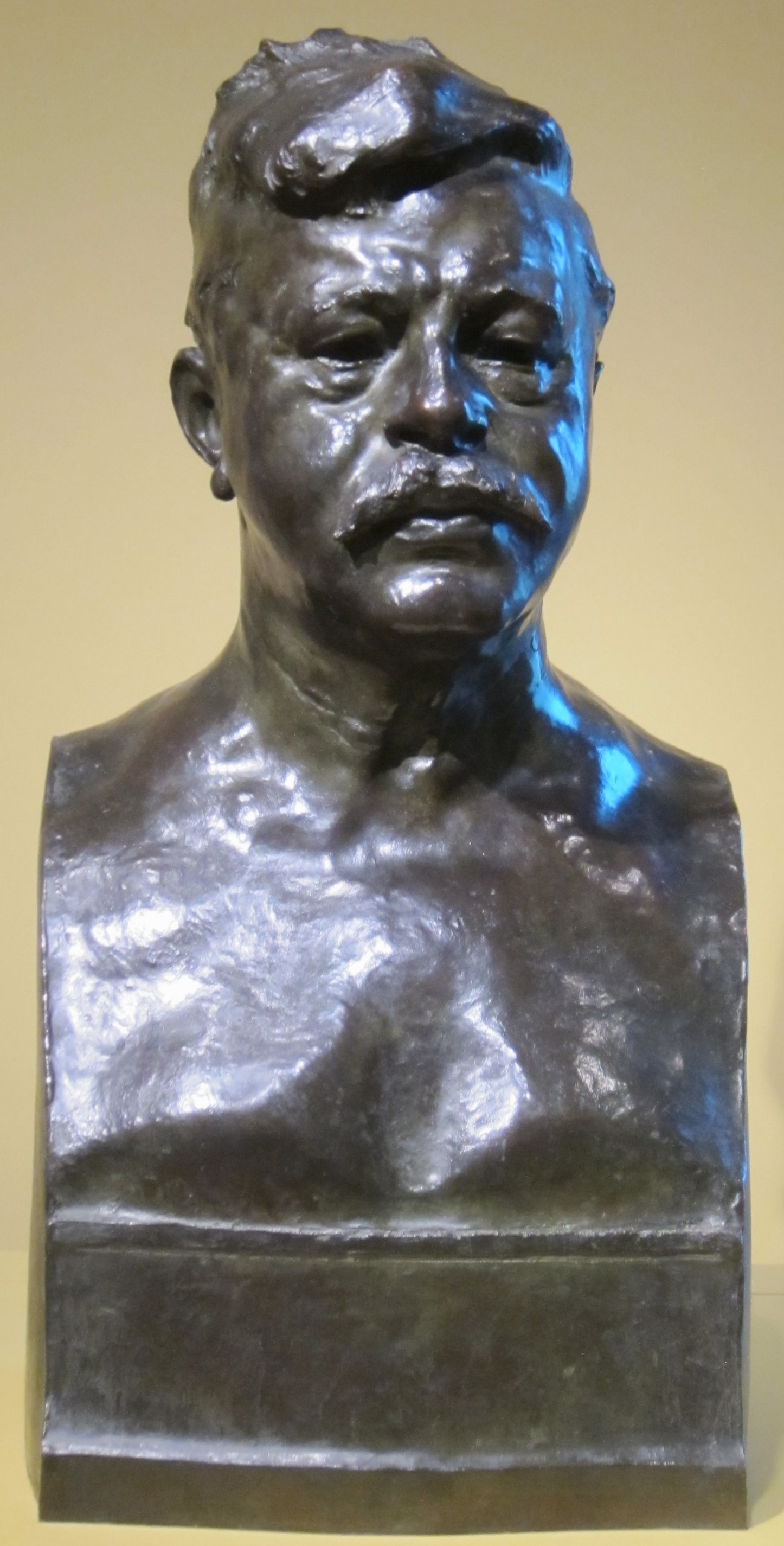
Charles Grafly, Portrait of Frank Duveneck, 1915

== Exhibitions ==
The Cincinnati Art Museum hosts several national and international special exhibitions each year. Each exhibition is accompanied by public programs, activities and special events. Exhibitions included Paintings, Politics and the Monuments Men: The Berlin Masterpieces in America, Hank Willis Thomas: All Things Being Equal..., and No Spectators: The Art of Burning Man.

The Cincinnati Art Museum's approach to hosting special exhibitions has changed over time. The museum found it impractical to spend as much as $2.5 million a year on special exhibitions when it has unexploited holdings like circus posters and Dutch contemporary design, especially given its declining endowment. As a result, in 2010 the museum mounted "See America", nine small shows that highlighted different parts of the country through the museum’s collection. Attendance at the museum has increased by 30 percent since it started emphasizing its permanent collection.

== Management ==
=== Admission and hours of operation ===
General admission is always free to the Cincinnati Art Museum’s 73 permanent collection galleries and the Rosenthal Education Center (REC) family interactive center of the museum, thanks to the Richard and Lois Rosenthal Foundation, the Thomas J. Emery Endowment and an endowment established by the Cincinnati Financial Corporation/The Cincinnati Insurance Companies.

The Art Museum, located at 953 Eden Park Drive in Eden Park, is open Tuesdays through Sundays.

=== Funding ===
By 2011, the museum's endowment was down to about $70 million from about $80 million in 2008. The endowment soon recovered to pre-recession levels, valued at $87 million in 2014.
