= Sibyl and Prophet =

Painting by Andrea Mantegna

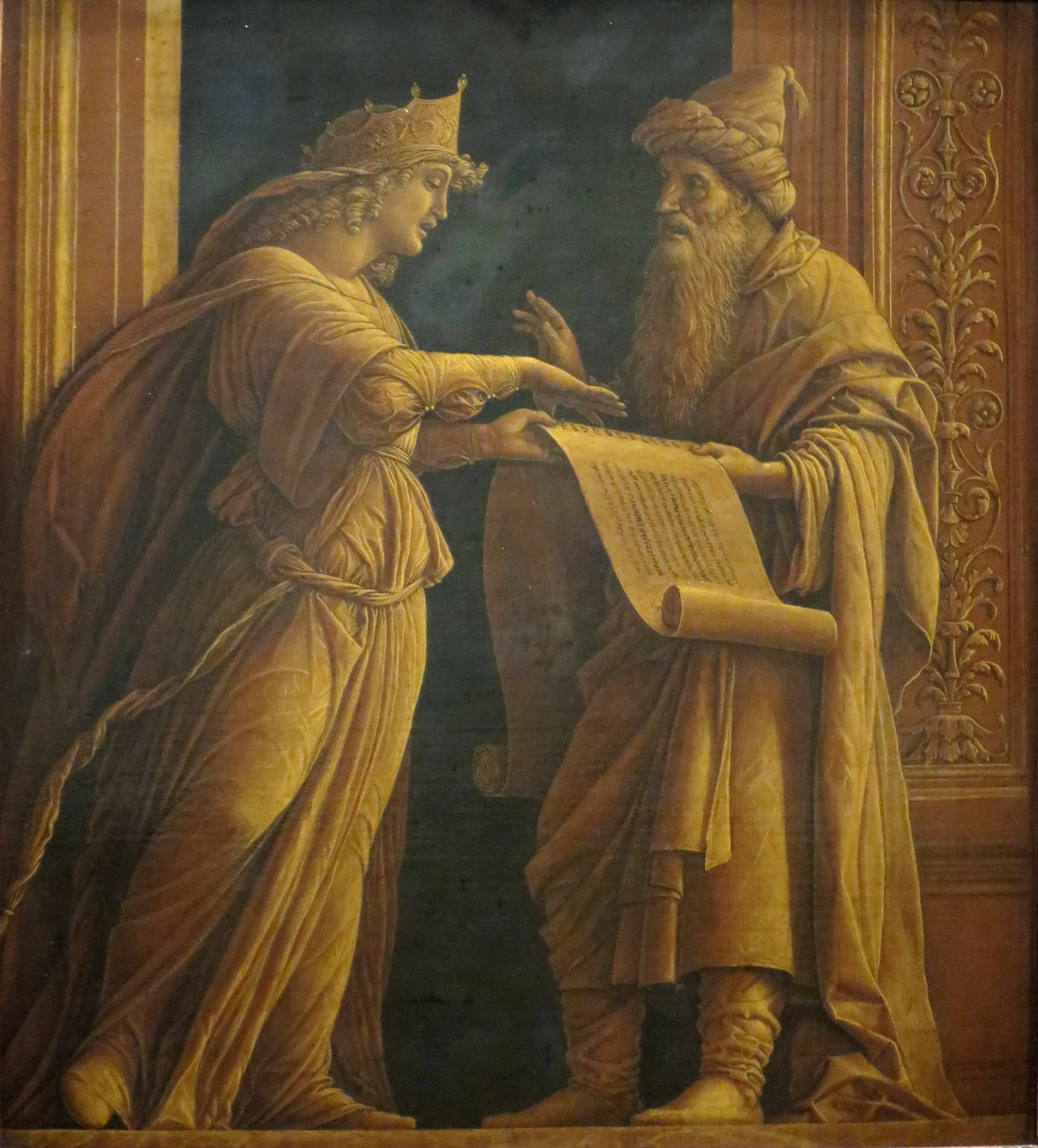
- Artist: Andrea Mantegna
- Year: c. 1495
- Medium: distemper and gold on canvas
- Dimensions: 56.2 cm × 48.6 cm (22.1 in × 19.1 in)
- Location: Cincinnati Art Museum, Cincinnati

Sibyl and Prophet is a grisaille distemper painting by Andrea Mantegna c. 1495. It is now in the Cincinnati Art Museum.

== History ==
Mantegna produced several grisailles in the last eleven years of his life; this style imitated relief sculpture and was then popular in the Mantuan court due to the duchy's lack of major sculptors and stone quarries. Possibly a fragment from a larger work, it was probably a commission by Isabella d'Este for her apartments and shows a sibyl in a crown and toga debating with a bearded Old Testament prophet who holds the scroll they are discussing.
