= Portrait of Ann Ford =

1760 painting by Thomas Gainsborough

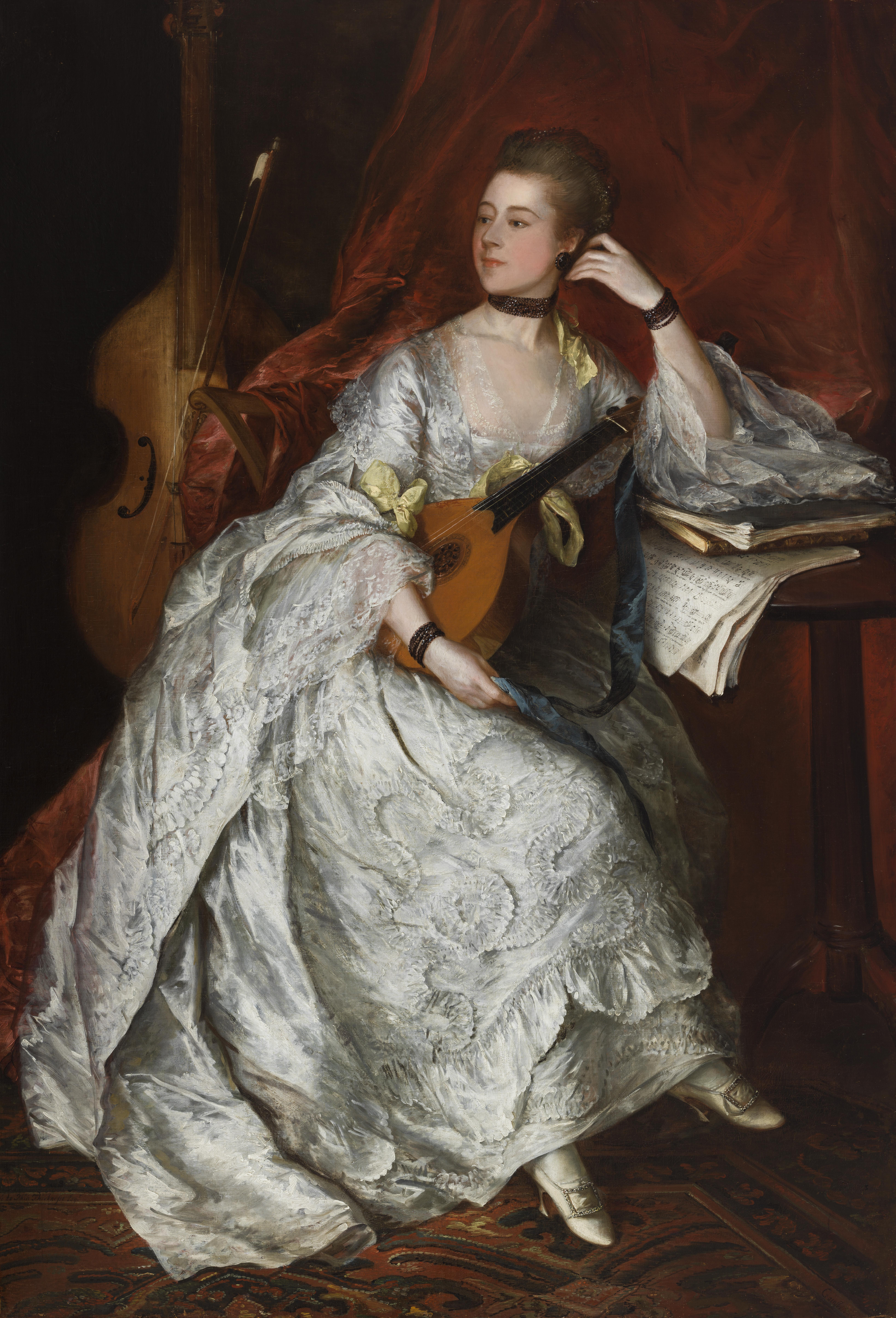
- Artist: Thomas Gainsborough
- Year: 1760
- Type: Oil on canvas, portrait painting
- Dimensions: 197.2 cm × 134.9 cm (77.6 in × 53.1 in)
- Location: Cincinnati Art Museum; Cincinnati

Portrait of Ann Ford is an oil on canvas portrait painting by the British artist Thomas Gainsborough, from 1760. It is a depiction of the musician and singer Ann Ford. He depicts her at full-length, sitting cross-legged while looking to the right. She is holding a guitar with one hand and stroking her hair with the other.

Gainsborough had moved to Bath the previous year, producing portraits of inhabitants and visitors to the fashionable spa town. The painting had the aim of promoting both Ford's career and his growing reputation as a portraitist.

Two years later Ford married Gainsborough's friend, the travel writer Philip Thicknesse. Today the painting is in the Cincinnati Art Museum, in Ohio.

== Bibliography ==
- Hamilton, James. Gainsborough: A Portrait. Hachette UK, 2017.
- Junod, Karen. Writing the Lives of Painters: Biography and Artistic Identity in Britain 1760–1810. Oxford University Press, 2011.
- Perry, Gillian. Spectacular Flirtations: Viewing the Actress in British Art and Theatre, 1768–1820. Yale University Press, 2007.
