= John Christian Rauschner =

American sculptor

John Christian Rauschner (born c. 1760) was a German artist who specialized in portraits made of wax. He worked for some time in the United States, travelling to Boston, New York City, Philadelphia and elsewhere. Examples of Rauschner's artwork are in the Albany Institute of History & Art; American Antiquarian Society; Bostonian Society; Fruitlands Museum; Historic New England; Massachusetts Historical Society; Metropolitan Museum of Art, New York; Museum of Fine Arts, Boston; New York Historical Society; Peabody Essex Museum; Philadelphia Museum of Art; West Point Museum; the White House, Washington DC; and Winterthur Museum.

== Images ==
Portraits by Rauschner

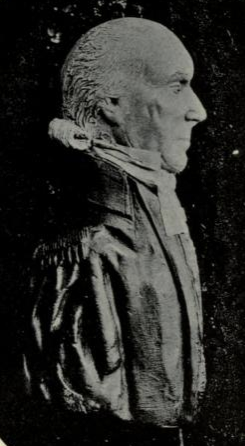
Ephraim Ward

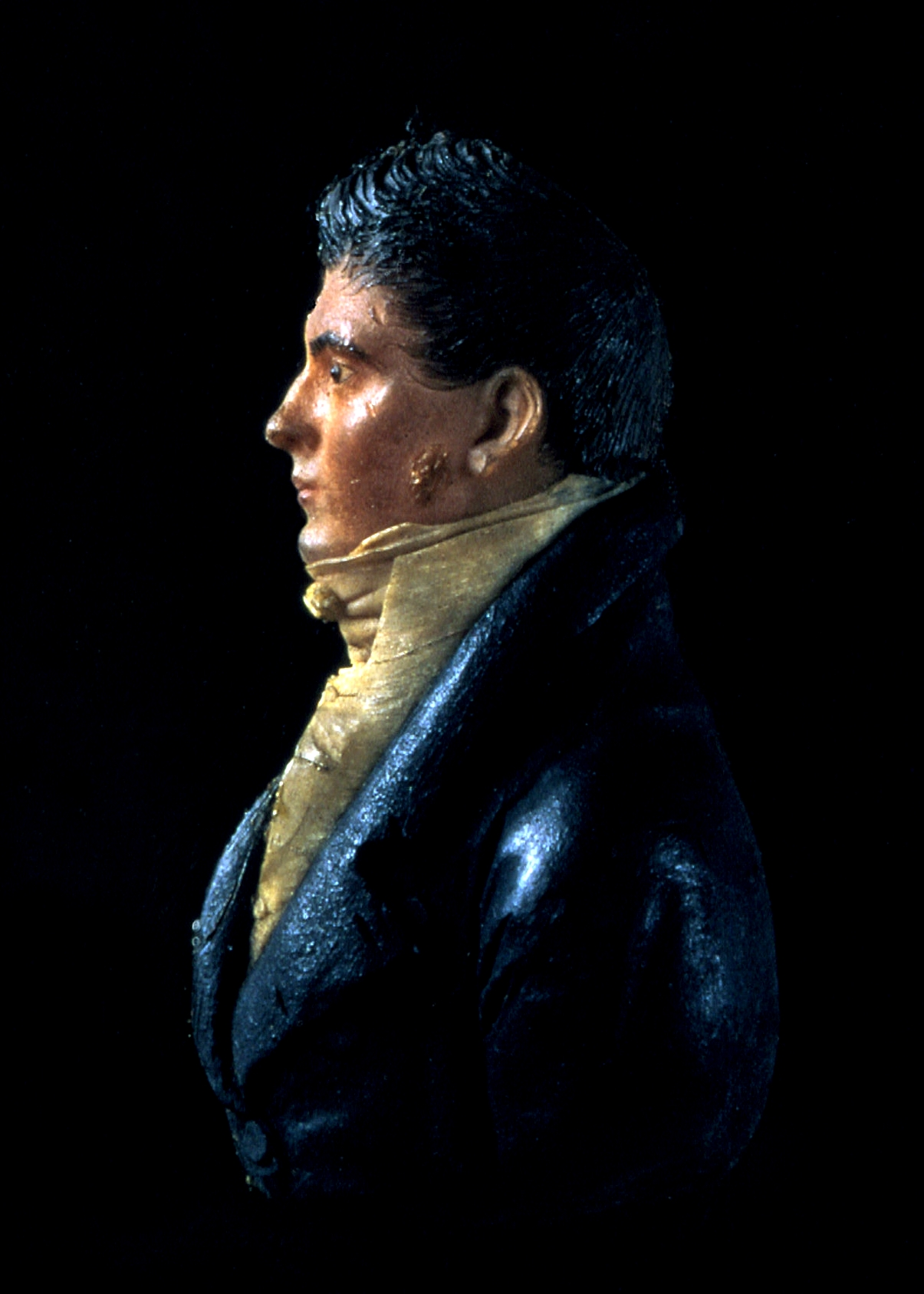
James Hoban

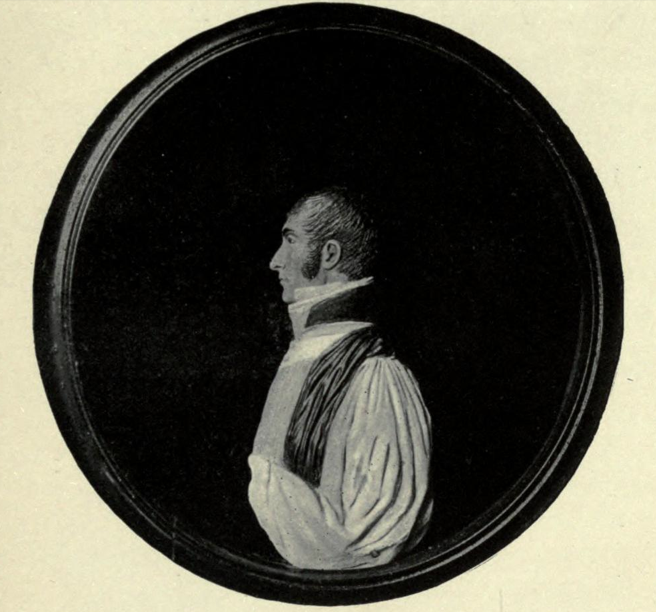
Asa Eaton

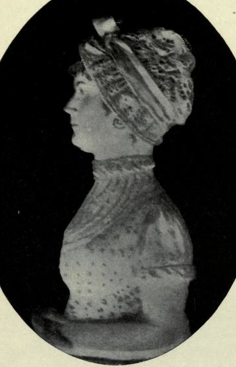
Lucy Lord Dutch

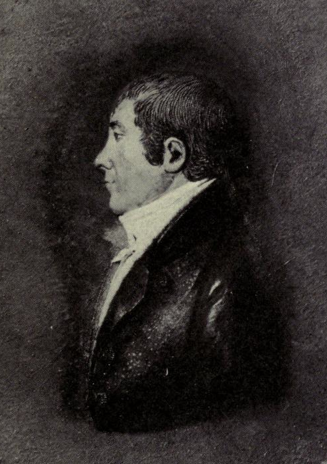
Oliver Holden
