= Two Captured Danish Ships Entering Portsmouth Harbour =

Painting by J. M. W. Turner

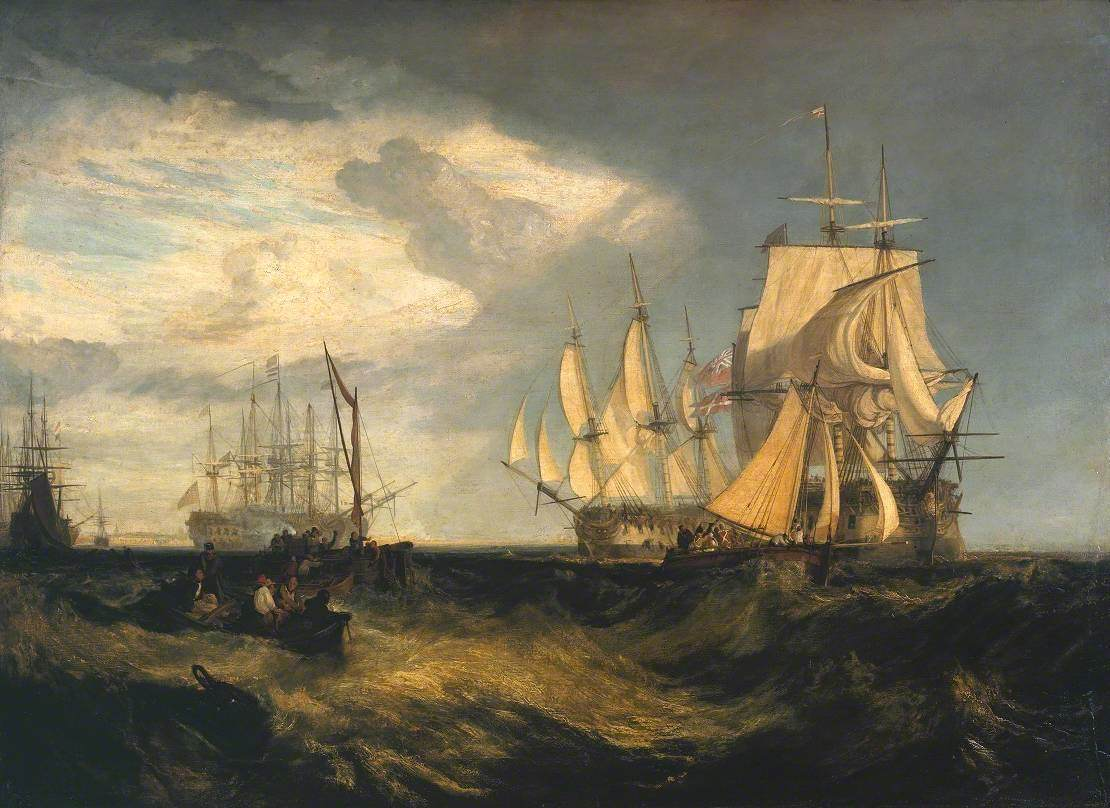
- Artist: J. M. W. Turner
- Year: 1807
- Type: Oil on canvas
- Dimensions: 233.7 cm × 171.4 cm (92.0 in × 67.5 in)
- Location: Tate Britain, London
- Website: www.tate.org.uk/...n00481

Two Captured Danish Ships Entering Portsmouth Harbour is an 1807 maritime painting by the English artist Joseph Mallord William Turner. It depicts two captured Danish ships of the line being brought into harbour by the Royal Navy at Spithead the major naval base off Portsmouth, Hampshire.

The ships had been seized in Britain's Bombardment of Copenhagen the same year. Britain had struck per-emptively to prevent the Danish Fleet falling into the hands of Napoleon's French Empire. Turner witnessed the ships being brought in to harbour after the battle. However, by the time he exhibited the work (in his own studio in Queen Anne Street rather than at the Royal Academy's Spring Exhibition at Somerset House) in 1809 he had renamed the canvas Spithead: Boat's Crew Recovering an Anchor due to the political backlash against the Copenhagen attack. Despite the fact one of the ships is clearly displaying the Danish flag, none of the reviewers appear to have picked up on this.

It is in the collection of the Tate Britain, having been part of the Turner Bequest in 1856.

== See also ==
- List of paintings by J. M. W. Turner

== Bibliography ==
- Brown, David Blayney. Turner: In the Tate Collection. Harry N. Abrams, 2002.
- Hamilton, James. Turner - A Life. Sceptre, 1998.
- Reynolds, Graham. Turner. Thames & Hudson, 2022.
- Spencer-Longhurst, Paul. The Sun Rising Through Vapour: Turner's Early Seascapes. Third Millennium Information, 2003.
