= Spithead =

Roadstead between Hampshire, England and the Isle of Wight

Coordinates: 50.75140°N 1.13667°W

Map showing the location of Spithead within the United Kingdom

Spithead is an eastern area of the Solent and a roadstead for vessels off Gilkicker Point in Hampshire, England. It is protected from all winds except those from the southeast, with the Isle of Wight lying to the south-west. Spithead and the channel to the north is the main approach for shipping to Portsmouth Harbour and onwards to Southampton. Spithead itself is an important naval anchorage. Historically, Spithead was used for assembling Royal Navy ships, including as a formation area for squadrons or fleets at anchor, as well as for the resupply of ships.

The artist Clarkson Frederick Stanfield described Spithead as "marked out by buoys at regular intervals, and is often the spot chosen for the assembling of the English fleet. The port is the general rendezvous where all ships homeward or outward bound take convoy, and frequently seven hundred merchantmen have sailed at one time from Spithead."

== Geography ==
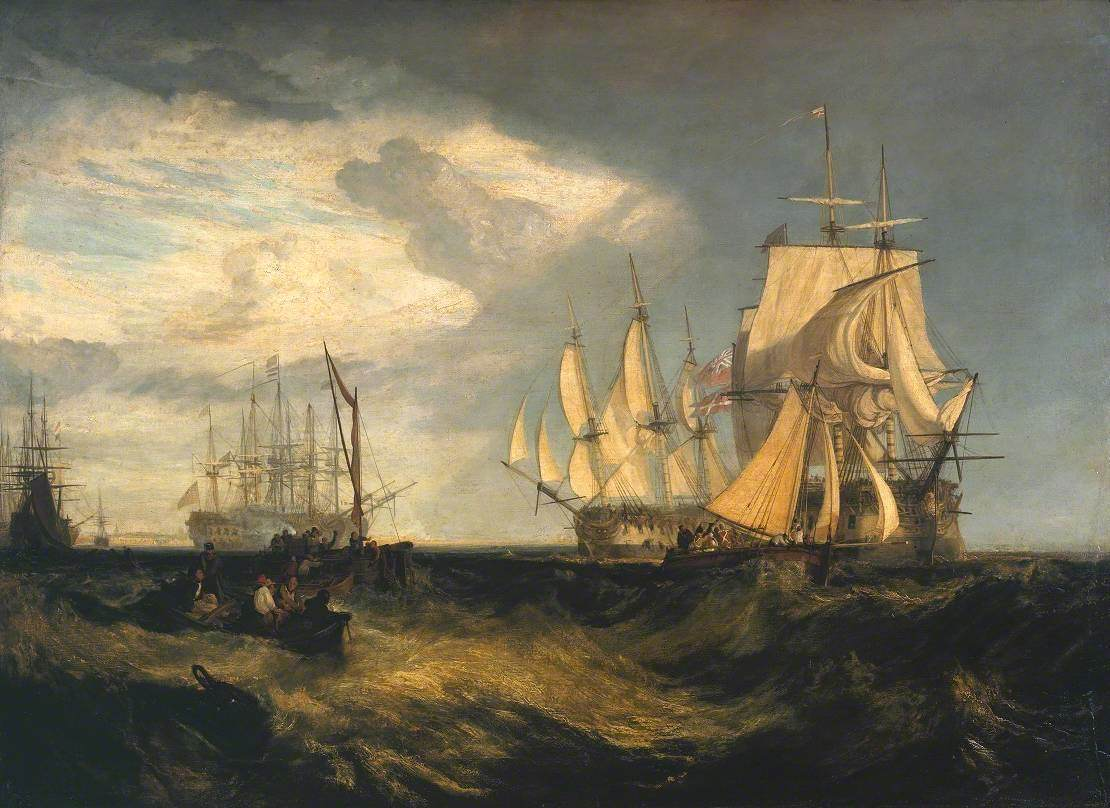
Two Captured Danish Ships Entering Portsmouth Harbour by Turner, 1807.

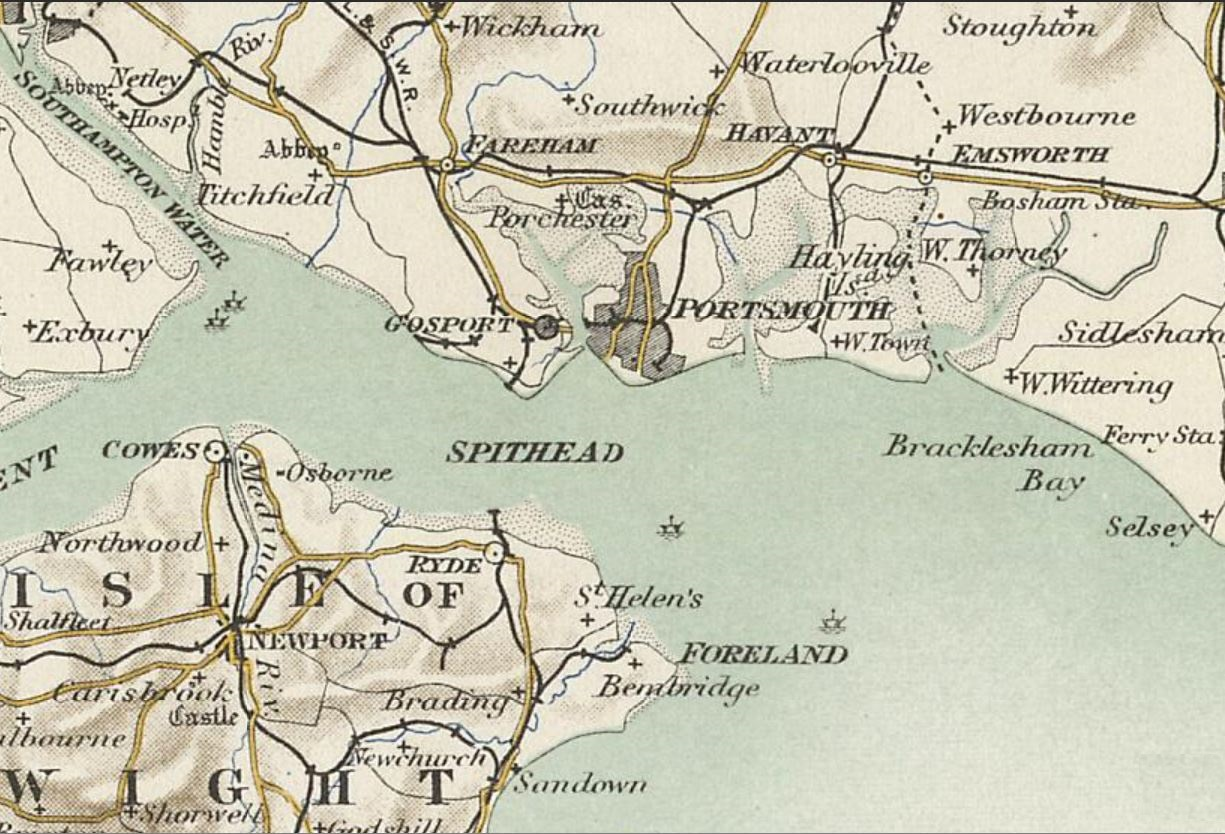
Spithead, on a 1:633600 scale OS map from 1904

1967 Admiralty Chart of the area (Nab Tower to Spithead)

It receives its name from the Spit, a sandspit that stretches south from the Hampshire shore for 5 km (3.1 mi). Spithead is 22.5 km (14.0 mi) long by about 6.5 km (4.0 mi) in average breadth. Horse and Dean Sand lie to the NE side and Ryde Sand and No Man's Land to the South side.

As of 2004, the main channel was reported as being maintained at a dredged depth of 9.5m.

== History ==
There is evidence of submerged prehistoric landscapes at Spithead.

On 19 July 1545, Mary Rose sank off Spithead.

The Spithead mutiny occurred in 1797 in anchored ships of the Royal Navy Channel fleet.

HMS Royal George sank in 1782 while under maintenance at Spithead with the loss of more than 800 lives.

The Fleet Review is a British tradition that usually takes place at Spithead, where the monarch reviews the massed Royal Navy. The 1937 Coronation Fleet Review and 1953 coronation reviews were two of the largest assemblies of warships in history, described by military historian Hedley Paul Willmott as "the last parade of the Royal Navy as the world's greatest and most prodigious navy".

In July 2007, Admiral Alan West, a former First Sea Lord, took the name Spithead when he was appointed to the House of Lords, taking the title Baron West of Spithead.

== Infrastructure ==
Spithead is strongly defended by four Solent Forts, which complement the fortifications of Portsmouth. The forts were begun in 1865 under Lord Palmerston and completed by 1880.

At the eastern end of the approaches to Spithead lies Nab Tower, which is sunk in place over rocks, replacing an earlier light vessel.

In 2016, several new Spithead navigational lights were installed on piles driven into the seabed, to be used by the Queen Elizabeth-class aircraft carriers.
