= A Country Blacksmith =

Painting by J. M. W. Turner

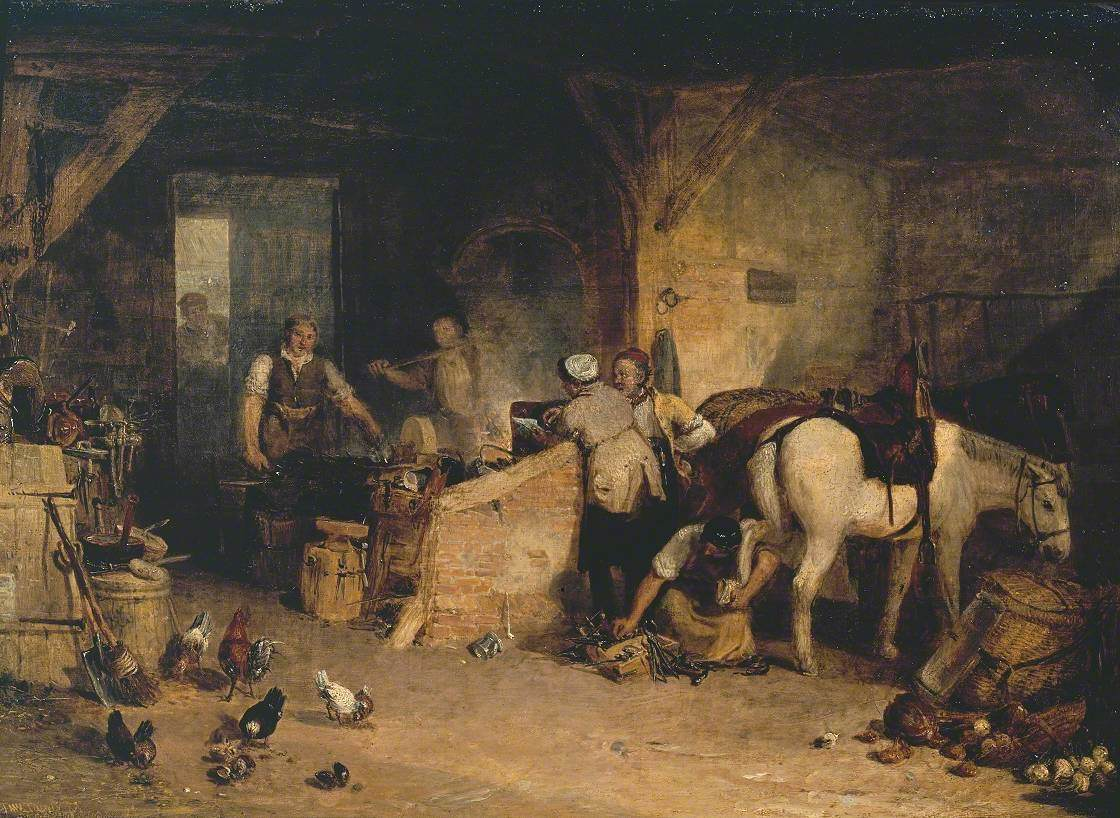
- Artist: J. M. W. Turner
- Year: 1807
- Medium: Oil on mahogany
- Dimensions: 77.8 cm × 54.9 cm (30.6 in × 21.6 in)
- Location: Tate Britain, London
- Accession: N00478
- Website: tate.org.uk...n00478

A Country Blacksmith is an 1807 genre painting by the British artist J.M.W. Turner. Its full title is A Country Blacksmith Disputing upon the Price of Iron, and the Price Charged to the Butcher for Shoeing his Poney. It shows the interior of a farrier's shop. Turner produced the painting as a response to the breakthrough work of the younger Scottish artist David Wilkie's genre work The Village Politicians the previous year.

It was shown at the Royal Academy's 1807 Summer Exhibition at Somerset House where it was considered to have upstaged Wilkie's neighbouring painting The Blind Fiddler. Turner sold the painting to the art collector Sir John Leicester but bought it back in 1827. Today it is on the Tate Britain having been part of the Turner Bequest of 1856.

== See also ==
- List of paintings by J. M. W. Turner

== Bibliography ==
- Bailey, Anthony. J.M.W. Turner: Standing in the Sun. Tate Enterprises Ltd, 2013.
- Hamilton, James. Turner - A Life. Sceptre, 1998.
- Reynolds, Graham. Turner. Thames & Hudson, 2022.
- Trotter, David. Cooking with Mud: The Idea of Mess in Nineteenth-century Art and Fiction. Oxford University Press, 2000.
