= Quirinus van Amelsfoort =

Dutch painter

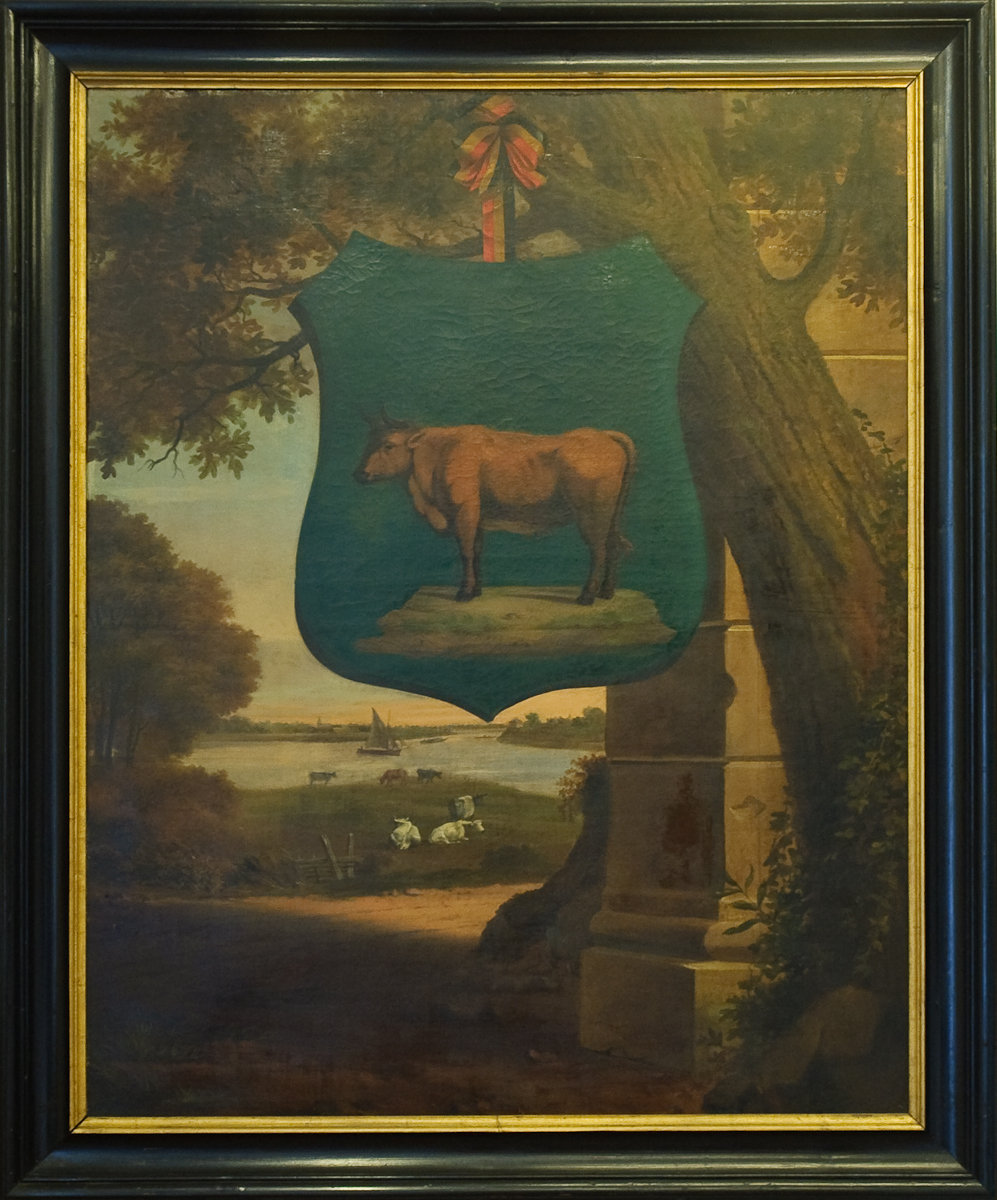
Maasland by Quirinus van Amelsfoort and Franciscus Johannes de Groot, Noordbrabants Museum in 's-Hertogenbosch, 1804–05

Quirinus van Amelsfoort (1760–1820) was a Dutch painter.

== Life ==
Van Amelsfoort was born and died at 's-Hertogenbosch. He painted allegories, history, and portraits; in the last the likenesses were remarkable for their truth.

In 1804–05 the departmental government of Brabant commissioned a set of fifteen paintings of coats of arms from van Amelsfoort and Franciscus Johannes de Groot. They are now in the collection of the Noordbrabants Museum.
