= Andrea Toresani =

Italian Baroque painter (1727–1760)

Andrea Torresani (c. 1727–1760) was an Italian painter of the Baroque period, active in his native city of Brescia, Milan, and Venice.

Died at age 33 years from a stroke. He was said to have trained with a mediocre painter by the name of Antonio Aureggio in Brescia. Moved to Venice, where he became known as an excellent painter of landscapes, portraits, and draughtsman. He is known to have penned landscapes for Zaccharia Sagredo and Pietro Guarienti.

A printer with a similar name (Andrea Torresano) was active in Venice 1480–1520.
