= Jan Regulski =

Jan Regulski (1760 - 28 July 1807) was a Polish glyptic artist and medalist.

== Family ==
Regulski came from an impoverished family. His parents' names and occupations are not known. His talent was recognized as a boy by two wealthy landowners of the area, Stanisław Kostka Potocki and Ignacy Potocki, when he did carvings using an awl and knife with olive pits. The Potocki families paid for his education in national schools and then further training in Rome and Naples, which lasted until 1780. He married Marianne Chmielewska. They had three children, of whom the eldest son of Stanislaw distinguished himself as a translator and poet.

== Career ==
In 1783, most likely by their patrons brothers Potocki, Regulski was appointed to the royal court as an officer medal collection and other collections of King Stanisław August Poniatowski. In order to create an Academy of Fine Arts, the king was planning to entrust the management of collections of antiques. But when the creation of a new university did not happen, he instead appointed Regulski as the official Polish Mint artist. Regulski was most successful in carving gems: the image of the king as gifts, the royal family, and different depictions of the mythical, historical and contemporary. As a sculptor he represented classicism. He executed a commemorative medal engraving, and made such a medal with a portrait of the king on the obverse to commemorate the start of construction of the church of St. Providence and medal-military gift for Prince Józef.

== Politics ==
On April 19, 1794, Regulski joined the Kościuszko Uprising. Some sources imply that it belonged to the Polish Jacobins. Soon he was brought before the court on charges of inciting the people of the capital and enforcing the Targowica Confederation, but after a hearing in the Supreme Court he was acquitted.

After the Third Partition of Poland and the start of Prussian rule in Warsaw, Regulski was favored by Frederick William II of Prussia. In 1795 he moved to Berlin, and was appointed curator of the Royal Collection. The king sent him to Italy in order to make purchases antiques to enrich the Berlin collection. When Regulski returned to the Prussian capital, the king was already Friedrich Wilhelm III. The new monarch was devoid of any interest in art, so he refused to pay for the purchases made. Regulski went with them in 1798 to Warsaw, where he devoted himself to art and enlarging his collection.

== Death ==
On July 28, 1807, Regulski died in Warsaw. After his death his collections were dispersed. Unfortunately, he did not always sign the gem and small sculptures, so it is difficult to figure out which of the surviving engraved gems in Polish museums and cameos are his work.
