= Pioneer Mother (Grafly) =

Sculpture in San Francisco, California, U.S.

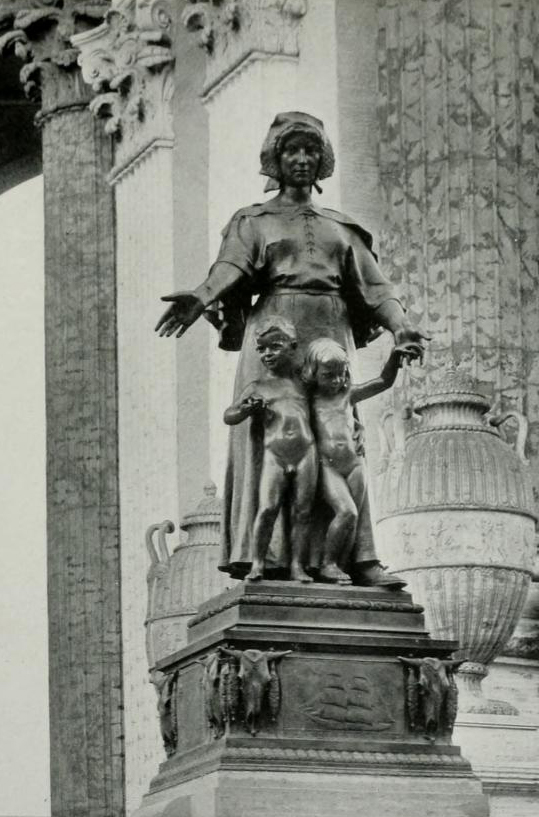
- Artist: Charles Grafly
- Medium: Bronze sculpture
- Location: Golden Gate Park, San Francisco, California, U.S.
- 37°46′15.2″N 122°28′27.5″W

Pioneer Mother is a bronze sculpture by Charles Grafly, installed in San Francisco's Golden Gate Park, in California. It is probably Grafly's best known sculpture.

== History ==
John E. D. Trask, a museum administrator and former managing director of the Pennsylvania Academy of the Fine Arts, headed the Fine Arts Department for the planned 1915 Panama-Pacific Exposition. The Pioneer Mother Monument Association raised $22,500 for the project, and Trask commissioned Grafly to create the sculpture in 1913. Grafly's plaster sketches are preserved at Wichita State University's Ulrich Museum of Art, and an early iteration of the work bordered on comical—a stalwart mother balancing screaming twin infants, one on each arm. Grafly's final model went in another direction, granting the woman and her two naked toddlers a simple dignity. The casting took longer than expected, and the sculpture was not in place for the exhibition's March 2, 1915 opening. Set atop a 26-foot (7.9 m) stepped concrete base, the monument was dedicated on June 30, 1915.

The Pioneer Mother monument, by Charles Grafly, is a permanent bronze, a tribute by the people of the West to the women who laid the foundation of their welfare. It is to stand in the San Francisco Civic Center, where its masterful simplicity will be more impressive than in this colorful colonnade. It is a true addition to noteworthy American works of art and fully expresses the spirit of this courageous motherhood, tender but strong, adventurous but womanly, enduring but not humble. It has escaped every pitfall of mawkishness, stubbornly refused to descend to mere prettiness, and lived up to the noblest possibilities of its theme. The strong hands, the firmly set feet, the clear, broad brow of the Mother and the uncompromisingly simple, sculpturally pure lines of figure and garments are honest and commanding in beauty. The children, too, are modeled with affectionate sincerity and are a realistic interpretation of childish charm. Oxen skulls, pine cones, leaves and cacti decorate the base; the panels show the old sailing vessel, the Golden Gate, and the transcontinental trails.

Relocation of the monument to San Francisco's Civic Center never happened, and the sculpture was rediscovered during the Great Depression, weather-beaten and vandalized, amidst the ruins of the 1915 world's fair. Civic and historical groups, notably the Native Daughters of the Golden West, raised money to restore the sculpture for the 1939 Golden Gate International Exposition. After the exposition, it was installed in Golden Gate Park and rededicated on December 8, 1940.

== See also ==
- Madonna of the Trail
