= General Galusha Pennypacker Memorial =

Public monument in Philadelphia

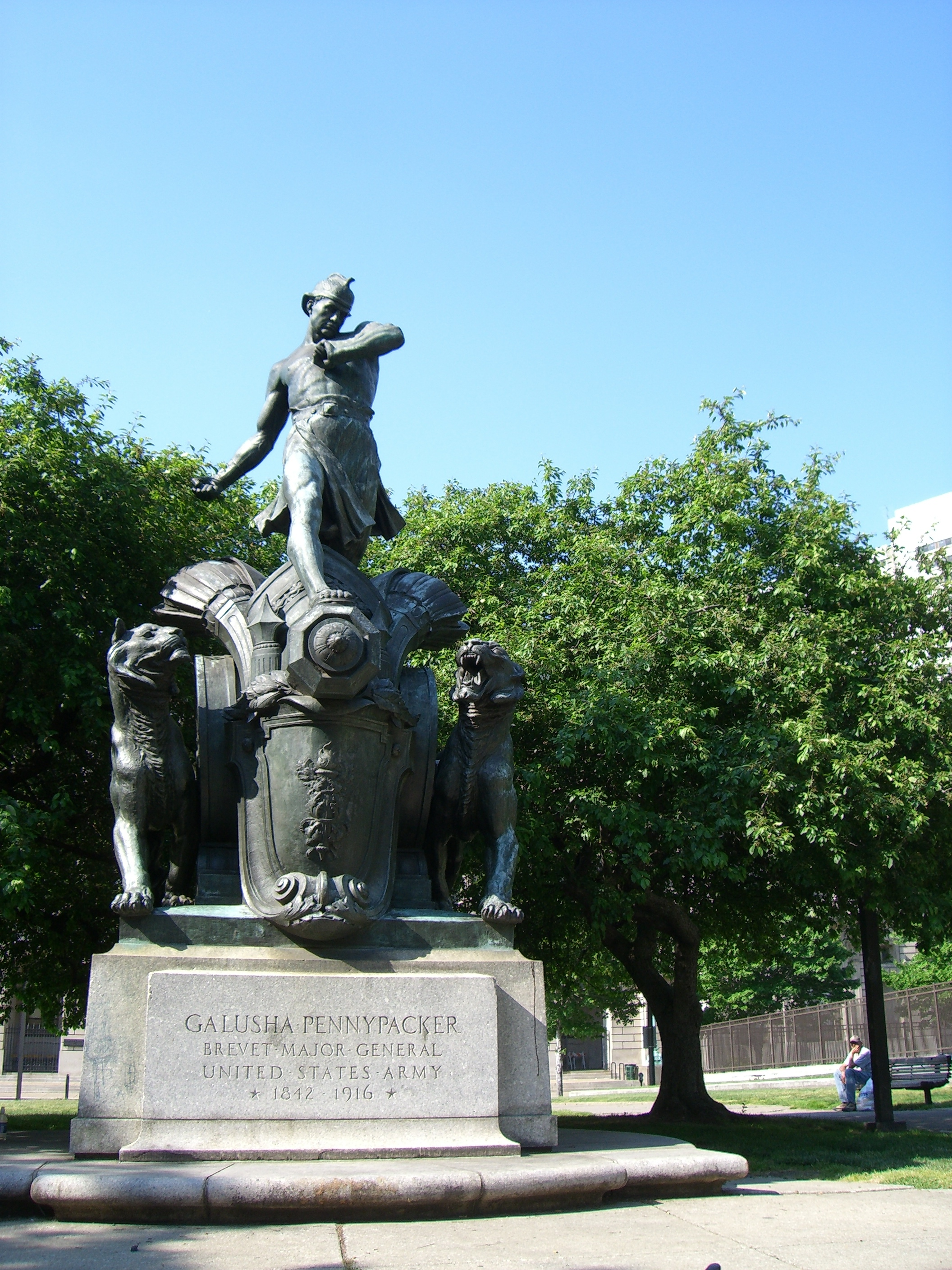
- The monument in 2007
- Interactive map of General Galusha Pennypacker Memorial
- Location: Logan Circle, Philadelphia, Pennsylvania, United States
- Coordinates: 39°57′30.5″N 75°10′10.5″W
- Designer: Charles Grafly; Albert Laessle
- Fabricator: Roman Bronze Works
- Type: Statue
- Material: Bronze; Limestone
- Length: 8 feet 2 inches (2.49 m)
- Width: 8 feet 2 inches (2.49 m)
- Height: 17 feet (5.2 m)
- Completion date: 1934
- Dedicated date: June 1, 1934
- Dedicated to: Galusha Pennypacker

The General Galusha Pennypacker Memorial is a monument in Philadelphia, Pennsylvania, United States. Located in the city's Logan Circle, the monument honors Galusha Pennypacker, a Pennsylvanian who served as a general officer in the Union Army during the American Civil War. Work on the memorial first commenced under sculptor Charles Grafly, though after his death in 1929, work was continued by Albert Laessle, a former student of Grafly, who completed the sculpture in 1934. The overall design for the sculpture depicts Pennypacker in classical dress descending from a stylized cannon that is surrounded by two tigers.

== History ==
=== Background ===
Galusha Pennypacker was a native of Valley Forge, Pennsylvania, who enlisted in the United States Army during the American Civil War. He became the captain of a company within the 98th Pennsylvania Infantry Regiment and was wounded during the Second Battle of Fort Fisher in 1865. Shortly thereafter, at the age of either 20 or 22, (Note: There is some disagreement among historians regarding the year of Pennypacker's birth and, as a result, his age at the time of his promotion. Sources generally differ between 20 and 22 for his age.) he became the youngest person to be promoted to the rank of general in the U.S. Army. Following the war, Pennypacker held various military commands in the American South during the Reconstruction era. He retired from military service in 1883 and died in 1916.

=== Creation ===
The idea for a memorial honoring Pennypacker in Philadelphia was the result of a collaboration between the General Pennypacker Memorial Commission and the Pennsylvania State Art Commission. Work on the design of the memorial was begun by Philadelphia-based sculptor Charles Grafly, who had studied at the École des Beaux-Arts and taught at the Pennsylvania Academy of the Fine Arts. However, in 1929, while working on the memorial, Grafly died. However, prior to his death, he had designed the general concept for the monument's appearance, and work on the art continued under the supervision of sculptor Albert Laessle, who had been a student of Grafly. The work was completed in 1934, with the casting done by the Roman Bronze Works of New York City.

=== Dedication ===
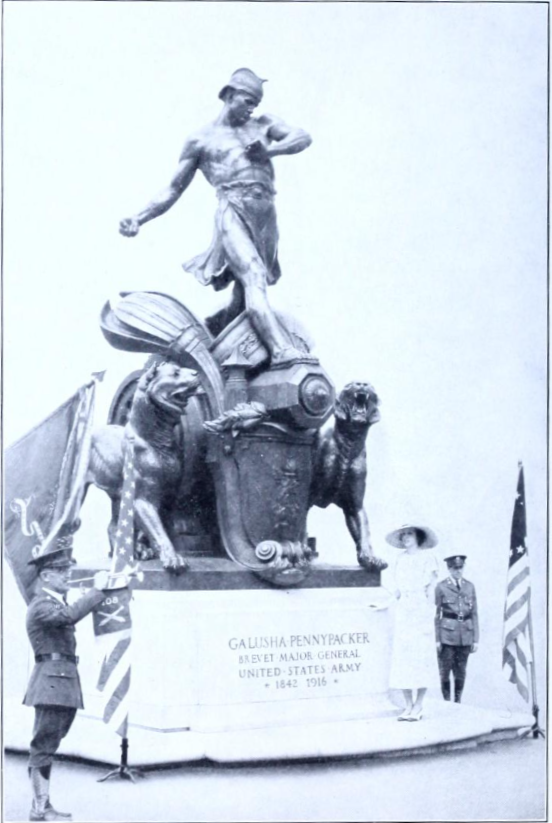
The memorial at its unveiling in 1934

The memorial, located near the intersection of 19th Street and Benjamin Franklin Parkway in Logan Circle, was formally dedicated on June 1, 1934, Pennypacker's birthday. The ceremony was attended by a large number of spectators and saw the involvement of many civic groups in the city, including the Grand Army of the Republic posts, the Historical Society of Pennsylvania, the Society of the Cincinnati, and several art societies in the city. The ceremony commenced with a playing of "America" by the 108th Field Artillery Regiment band. The dedication was then called to order by Isaac R. Pennypacker, a cousin of Galusha's, before an invocation was given by the Reverend Louis Washburn of Christ Church, Philadelphia. The memorial was then presented by Richard J. Beamish, the secretary of the commonwealth of Pennsylvania, on behalf of the governor of Pennsylvania to the city of Philadelphia. The memorial was then unveiled by a granddaughter of Pennypacker's and accepted by J. Hampton Moore, the mayor of Philadelphia. The rest of the ceremony included a presentation of the sculptor, who was introduced to the crowd by architect Warren Powers Laird, an address by Major General William G. Price Jr., a dedicatory prayer by Washburn, and multiple songs, with the ceremony closing to a performance of the Star-Spangled Banner.

=== Later history ===
In 1993, the memorial was surveyed as part of the Save Outdoor Sculpture! program. Since the turn of the century, the memorial has been the subject of several conservation efforts, which have included treatment work done in 2007 and 2019.

== Design ==
The memorial is in the form of a monumental statue depicting Pennypacker as a muscular, bare-chested figure dressed in classical clothing, including a helmet, sandals, and skirt. He is descending from atop a stylized cannon, taking a large stride with his right leg forward, both hands clenched in fists with his left arm forward. On either side of the cannon are two roaring tigers. This entire sculpture, which is designed in the Beaux-Arts style, is made of bronze and rests on a limestone base. The sculpture has a height of 13 feet (4.0 m) and side dimensions of roughly 7 feet 5 inches (2.26 m), while the pedestal has a height of 4 feet (1.2 m) and side measurements of 8 feet 2 inches (2.49 m). The front of the base bears the inscription "GALUSHA PENNYPACKER/BREVET MAJOR GENERAL/UNITED STATES ARMY/1842 - 1916", while the statue itself bears the name of the sculptor and foundry marks ("Albert Laessle / Roman Bronze Works, N.Y.").

== See also ==
- List of public art in Philadelphia
- Philadelphia in the American Civil War

== Sources ==
- "General Galusha Pennypacker Memorial". Association for Public Art. Archived from the original on March 31, 2023.
- Bach, Penny Balkin (1992). Public Art in Philadelphia. Design by Katz Design Group. Philadelphia: Temple University Press. ISBN 978-0-87722-822-6.
- Cox, Lauren (October 28, 2019). "Public Art Spotlight: Recent Conservation of Six Public Artworks". City of Philadelphia. Archived from the original on October 1, 2020.
- Hingston, Sandy (May 24, 2022). "10 Powerful War Memorials in Philly". Philadelphia. Archived from the original on May 29, 2023.
- The Memorial to Brevet Major General Galusha Pennypacker, Youngest General of the United States Army, Logan Circle, Parkway, Philadelphia, Pennsylvania. The Pennypacker Memorial Commission of Pennsylvania. Philadelphia. 1934.
- "Major General Galusha Pennypacker, (sculpture)". Smithsonian Institution Research Information System. Archived from the original on July 19, 2023.
