= Albert Laessle =

American sculptor

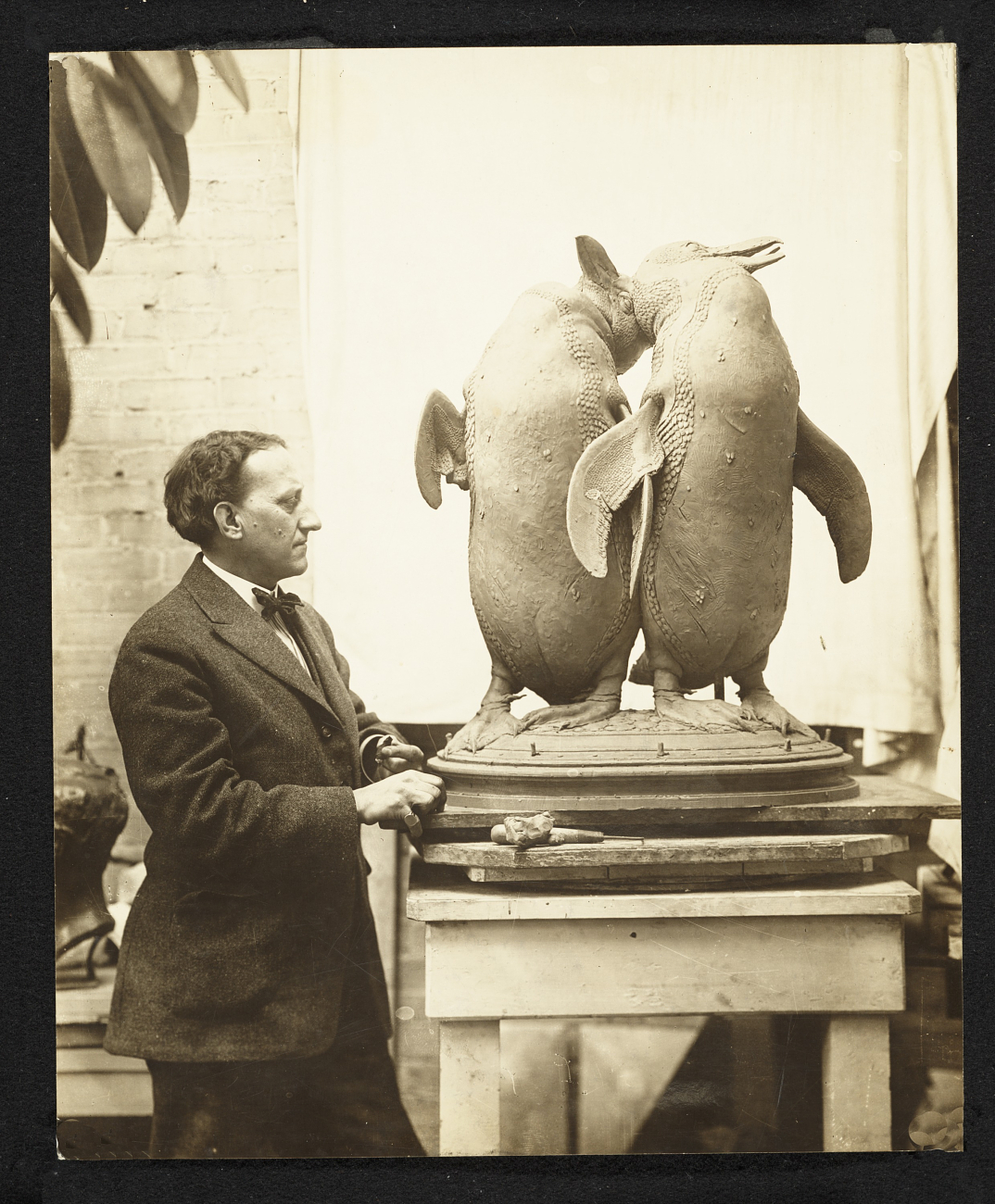
Albert Laessle with "Bronze Penguins"

Albert Laessle (March 28, 1877 – September 4, 1954) was an American sculptor and educator. He taught at the Pennsylvania Academy of the Fine Arts for more than twenty years and is best remembered as an animalier. He won the 1918 Widener Gold Medal.

== Life, education and career ==
Albert Laessle was born on March 28, 1877, in Philadelphia, Pennsylvania. His parents immigrated to the United States from Württemberg, Germany. Laessle had an older brother, Henry who was supportive of his artistic ambitions, whereas his parents were not.

Laessle studied art at several institutions: Spring Garden Institute in 1894; Drexel Institute (now Drexel University) 1894–1895, where he studied under Thomas Eakins; and the Pennsylvania Academy of the Fine Arts, where he studied under Thomas Anshutz and Charles Grafly. He spent three years, from 1904 to 1907 in Paris working with Michel Beguine.

In 1907, he returned to Philadelphia and worked in Grafly's studio.

In 1901, he was a contender for a gold medal from the Philadelphia Club for his famous plaster work Turtle and Crab, the turtle was so accurately sculpted, critics alleged it was cast. Laessle did not address the accusations which cost him the medal, but rather retaliated by producing another sculpture of a turtle out of wax which can not be cast, proving he did not cast the first work.

In 1910, he won a medal at the Buenos Aires International Exposition and in 1915, he won a gold medal at the Panama–Pacific International Exposition. In 1916, he won first place in the Americanization Through Art exhibition in Philadelphia.

External videos
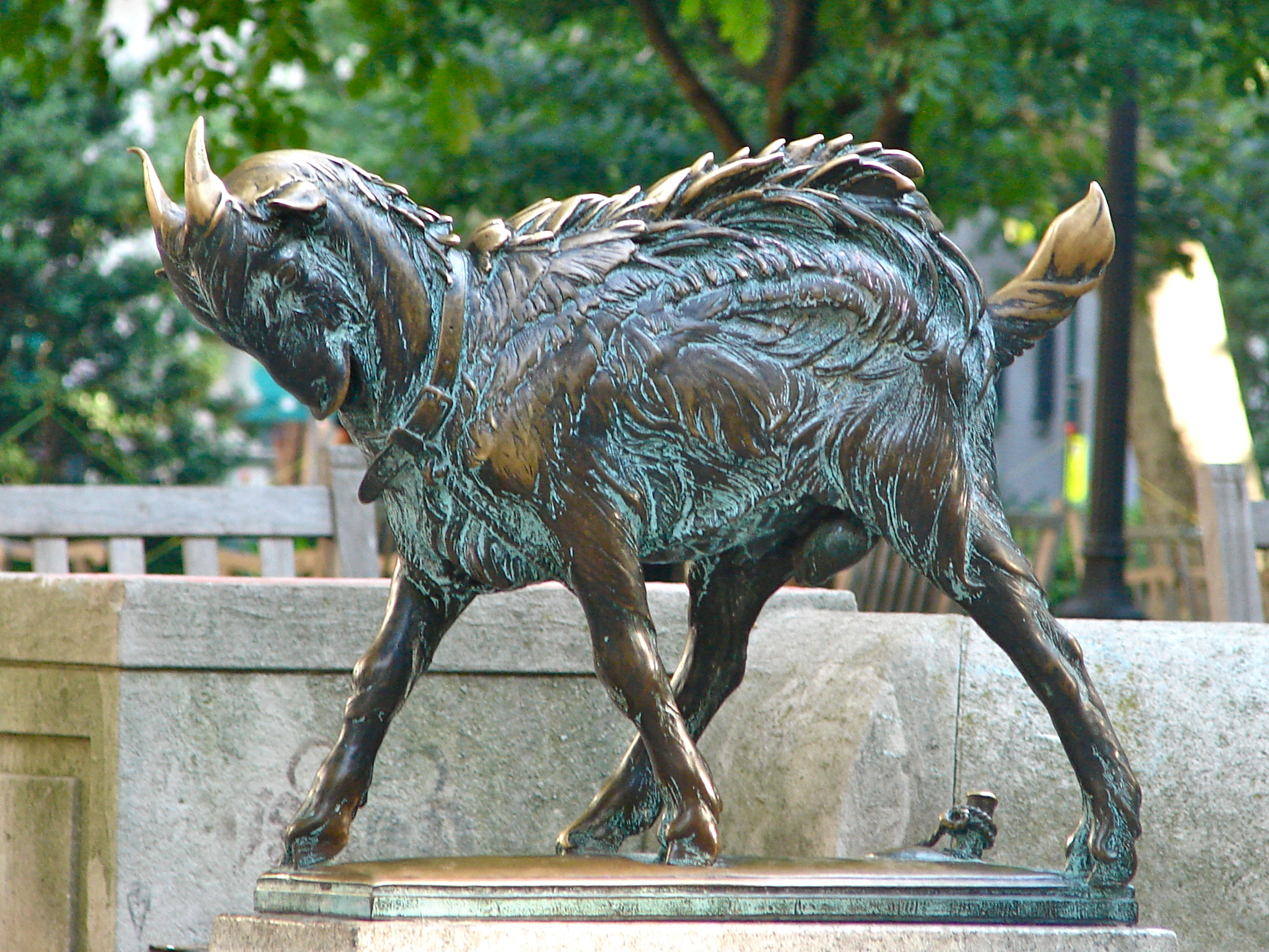
- Museum Without Walls - Billy by artist Albert Laessle, Association for Public Art

== Works ==
Laessle's sculptures can be found at the Carnegie Institute, the Peabody Institute, the Metropolitan Museum of Art and at the Pennsylvania Academy of the Fine Arts. In Philadelphia's Rittenhouse Square is his famous bronze Billy (1914) – a sculpture of a goat that is known to be a favorite of children who love to sit on it – which was given to the City of Philadelphia by Eli Kirk Price II through the Fairmount Park Art Association (now the Association for Public Art). At the Philadelphia Zoo is his group of bronze Penguins (1917), which was purchased by the Fairmount Park Art Association and installed at the entrance to the zoo's Bird House. Laessle's studio was close to the Philadelphia Zoo, which allowed him easy access to animal models.

Laessle collaborated with Grafly on the General Galusha Pennypacker Memorial for Philadelphia's Logan Circle. Pennypacker had been the youngest Union general in the American Civil War. Grafly's concept was to depict Pennypacker as a bare-chested Roman general astride a chariot-like cannon, and flanked by tigers. Grafly died in 1929, and Laessle completed the memorial, based on Grafly's designs, in 1934.

From 1919 until 1939, Laessle was an instructor at the Pennsylvania Academy. He retired due to a heart condition. In 1951, Laessle won the J. Sanford Saltus Award for Outstanding Achievement in the Art of the Medal from the American Numismatic Society. Among the medals he designed and sculpted during his long career was the Gold Medal of Award for the Sesquicentennial International Exposition held in Philadelphia in 1926. He sculpted America-Abundance, the tenth issue of the Society of Medalists in 1934. In 1927 he was elected into the National Academy of Design as an Associate member and became a full Academician in 1932.

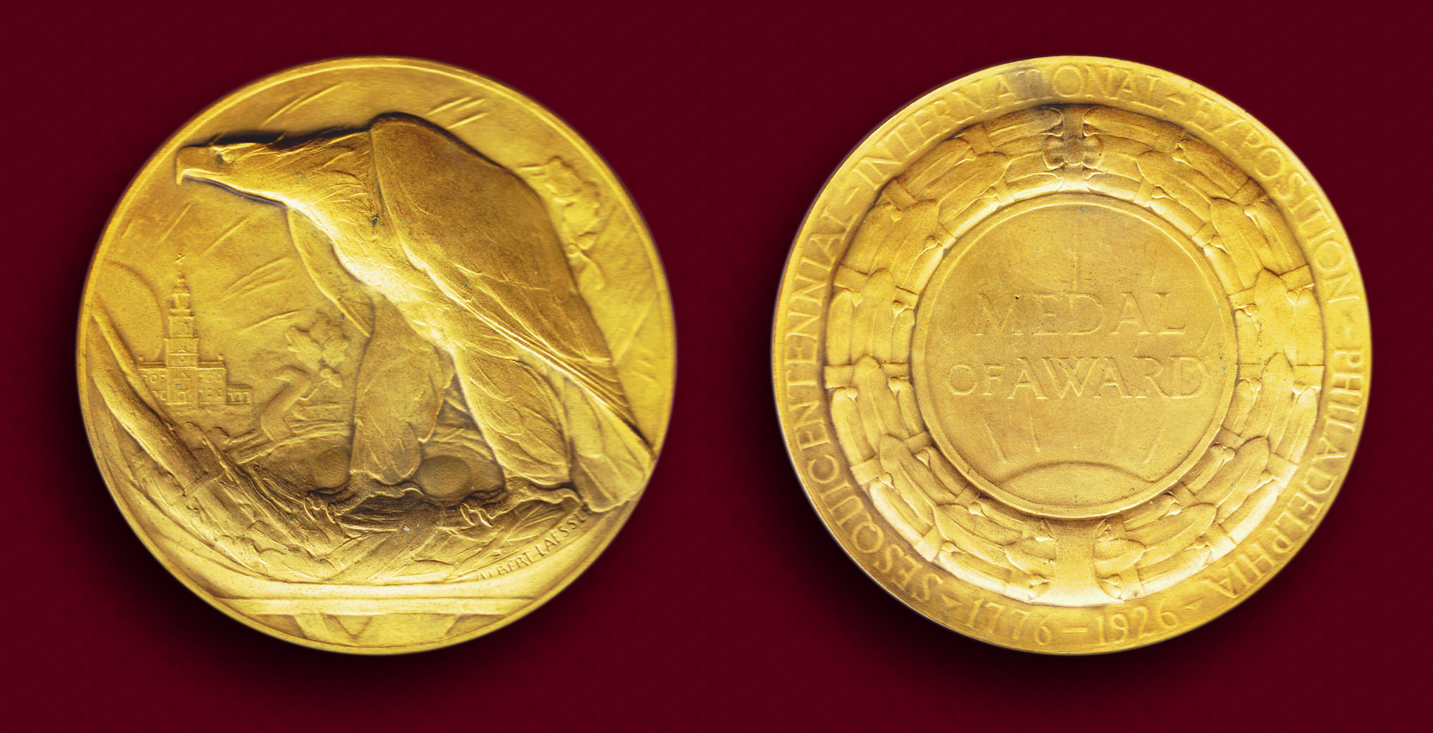
Albert Laessle's 1926 Sesquicentennial Exposition Gold Medal of Award.

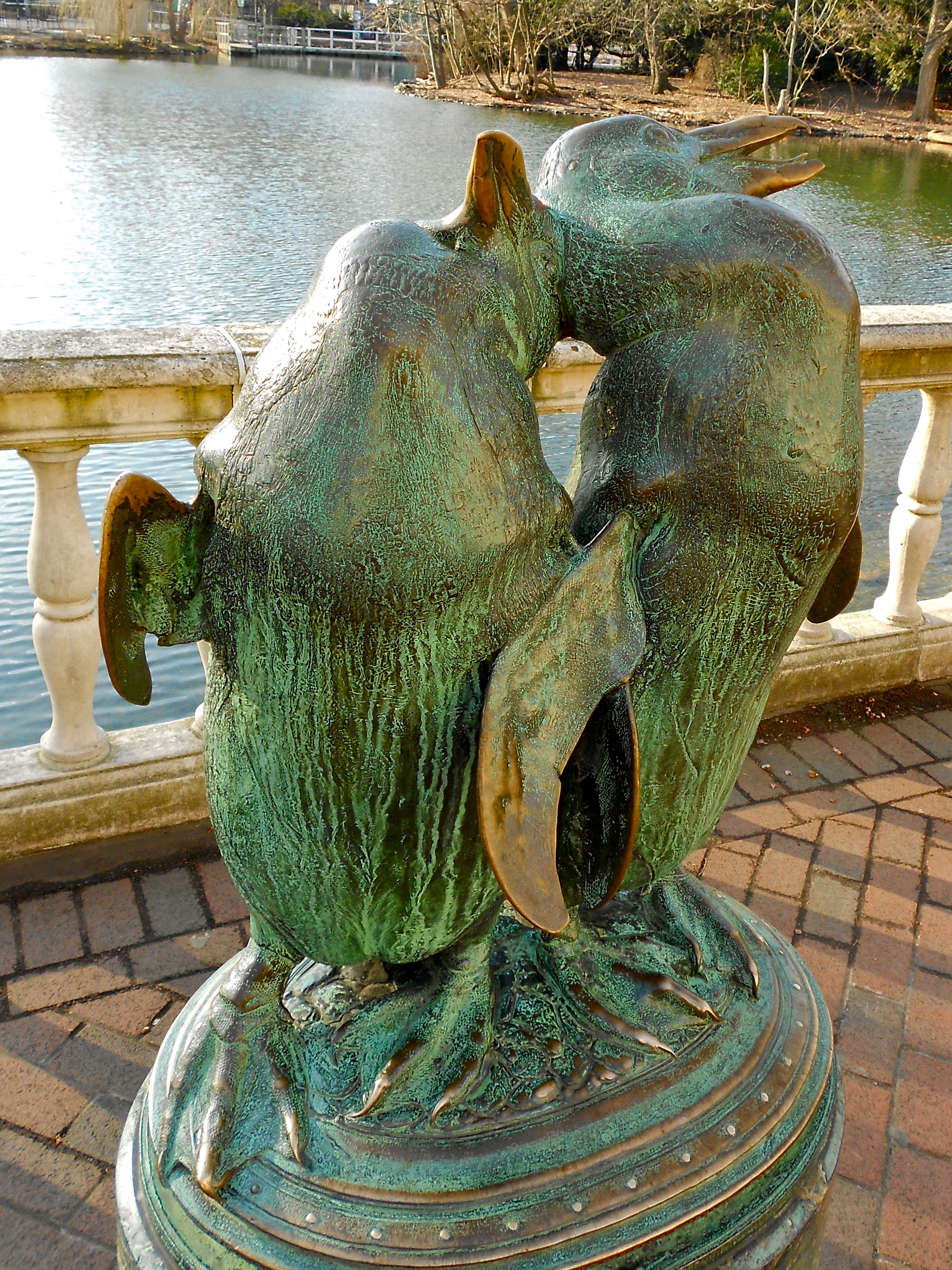
"Bronze Penguins" in the Philadelphia Zoo, 2012.

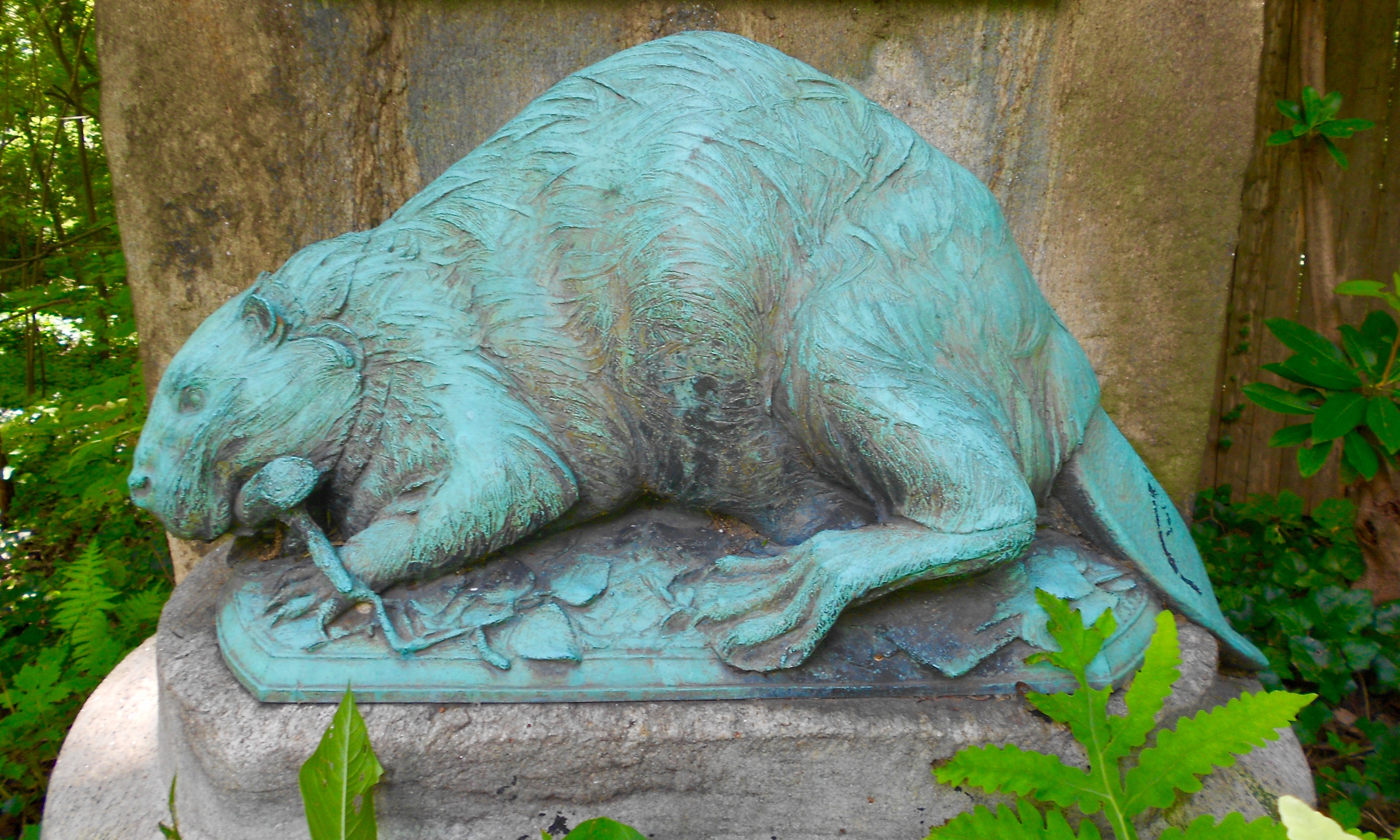
Beaver sculpture in Rose Valley, Pennsylvania

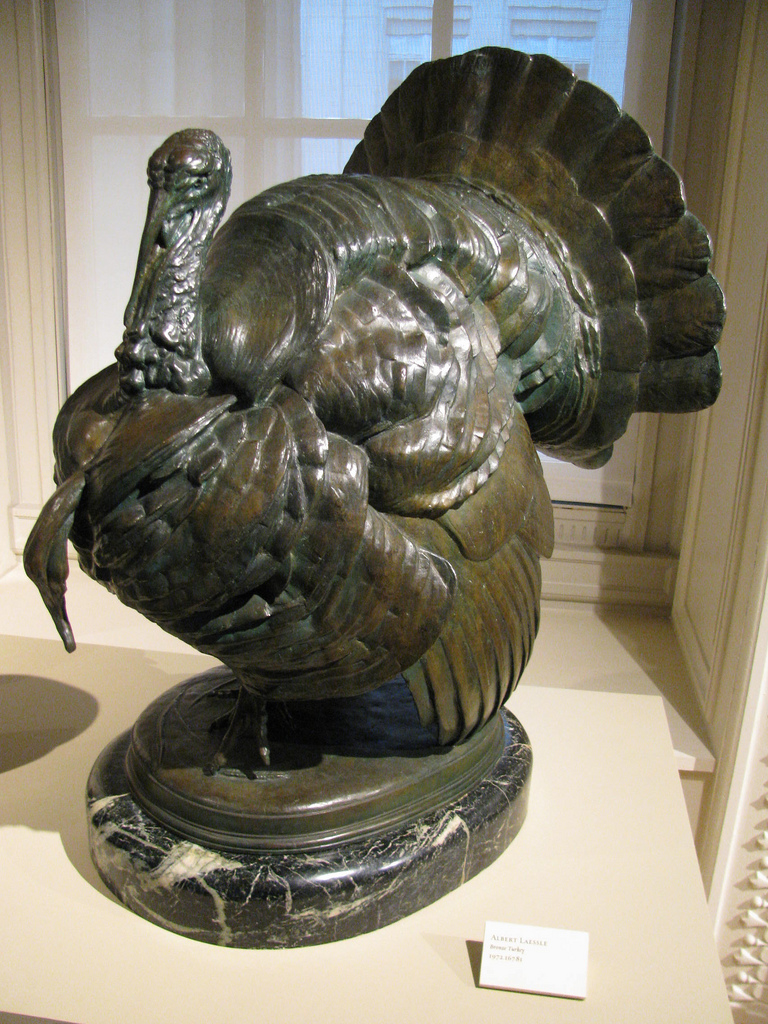
Turkey (bronze, ca. 1911)

== Personal life ==
Laessle and his wife Mary had two sons, Dr. Albert Middleton Laessle and Paul Laessle (1908–1988), who was also an artist. Mary died of a stroke in 1944.

He later married Albertine C. De Bempt.

== Death ==
Laessle died in his home in Miami, Florida, on September 4, 1954.

His papers are held at the Archives of American Art.
