= Dorothy Grafly =

American journalist and curator (1896–1980)

- Born: July 29, 1896
- Died: November 13, 1980
- Education: Wellesley College, Radcliffe College
- Occupations: Journalist, art critic
- Father: Charles Grafly

Dorothy Grafly (later Drummond) (July 29, 1896 – November 13, 1980) was an American journalist, art critic, author, curator and philanthropist. Grafly wrote extensively for a wide variety of newspapers and magazines, and was described in Time magazine as "the ablest art critic in the city" of Philadelphia. Her book A History of the Philadelphia Print Club appeared in 1929. She served as the editor of Art Outlook (1943–1949) and the publisher and editor of Art in Focus (1949–1980).

From 1932 to 1945, Grafly was curator at the Drexel Museum and Picture Gallery. In 1996, her biographical memoir of her father, sculptor Charles Grafly, was published along with an exhibition catalog, The sculptor's clay: Charles Grafly, 1862–1929, celebrating his studio collection which Grafly and her husband had donated to the Edwin A. Ulrich Museum of Art, Wichita State University.

== Early life and education ==
Artist and teacher Charles Grafly and his wife Frances Sekeles were married on June 7, 1895. Their daughter Dorothy Grafly was born on July 29, 1896, in Paris, France, where the family was visiting. Dorothy grew up at the family's home at 2140 N. 12th Street in Philadelphia, Pennsylvania, US. Her father had a studio at 2200 Arch Street and taught at Drexel University and later Pennsylvania Academy of the Fine Arts (PAFA).

Dorothy Grafly graduated from Wellesley College in 1918, at which time her address was given as 131 N. 20th St., Philadelphia, Pa. Her poetry was included in the collection Poets of the Future. She was a student of Radcliffe College at Harvard University in 1918–1919.

== Career ==
Grafly wrote widely for newspapers and magazines including the Philadelphia Public Ledger The Philadelphia Inquirer, The American Magazine of Art; and Art and archaeology. She was an art critic for The Philadelphia Bulletin; art editor of the North American and special correspondent for the Christian Science Monitor.

In 1932, Grafly was appointed curator at the Drexel Museum and Picture Gallery, where she remained until 1945. She was active in developing both outreach and educational programs. She served on the Advisory Art Committee at Drexel. On August 9, 1946, she married attorney Charles H. Drummond.

Grafly served as editor of Art Outlook from 1943 to 1949, a publication of Philip Ragan Associates. She was the publisher and editor of the monthly publication Art in Focus from 1949 to 1980.

In 1971, Grafly and her husband donated the contents of Charles Grafly's studio to Wichita State University. The Charles Drummond and Dorothy Grafly Drummond Fund supports the Ulrich Museum and the Grafly Gardens at Wichita State, where the sculptural works of Charles Grafly are presented.

== Archival collections ==
- Bust of Dorothy Grafly, by Frank Chinnici, Ulrich Museum of Art
- Dorothy Grafly Search, Special Collections and Archives, Drexel University
- Dorothy Grafly Search, Special Collections and Archives, Smithsonian Institution, Washington, DC
- Dorothy Grafly Collection, Special Collections and Archives, Wichita State University Libraries
