= Charles Grafly =

American sculptor

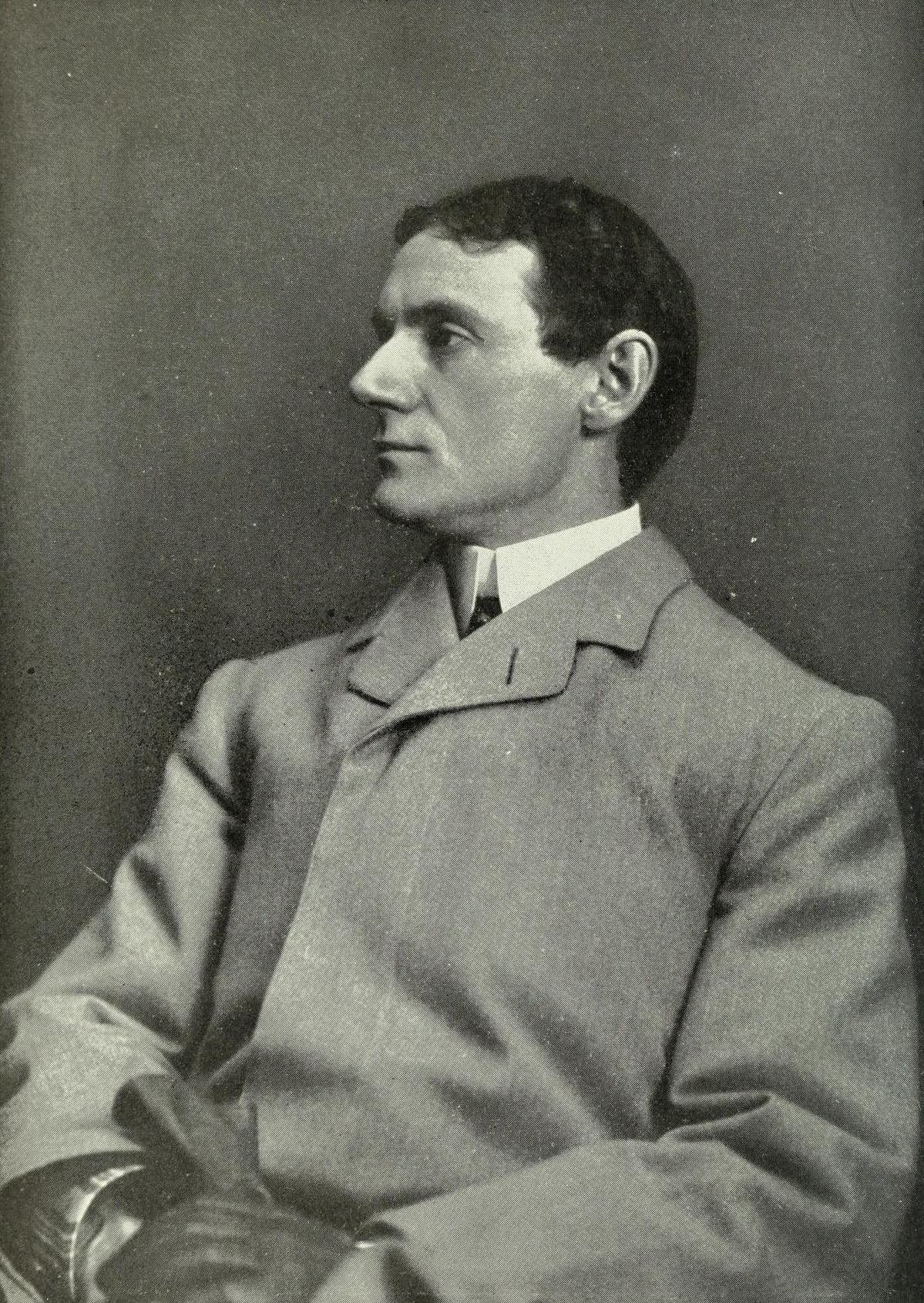
- Charles Allan Grafly, Jr.
- Born: December 3, 1862; Philadelphia, Pennsylvania, U.S.
- Died: May 5, 1929 (aged 66); Philadelphia, Pennsylvania, U.S.
- Education: Spring Garden Institute; Pennsylvania Academy of Fine Arts; Académie Julian; École des Beaux Arts
- Known for: Sculpture
- Notable work: Pioneer Mother (San Francisco); Meade Memorial (Washington, D.C.)

Charles Allan Grafly, Jr. (December 3, 1862 – May 5, 1929) was an American sculptor, and teacher. Instructor of Sculpture at the Pennsylvania Academy of the Fine Arts for 37 years, his students included Beatrice Fenton, Paul Manship, Albin Polasek, and Walker Hancock.

He created heroic sculpture for international expositions and war memorials, but also was noted for his small bronzes and portrait busts. His work is in the collections of the Metropolitan Museum of Art, the National Gallery of Art, the Smithsonian American Art Museum, the National Portrait Gallery, the Whitney Museum of American Art, the National Academy of Design, the Museum of Fine Arts Boston, and other museums.

== Education ==
Grafly was born in the Chestnut Hill section of Philadelphia, Pennsylvania, the youngest of the 8 children of Charles and Elizabeth (Simmons) Grafly. His family were Quaker farmers, and of German and Dutch heritage. He attended Philadelphia public schools, and developed an interest in art at an early age. At 17 he apprenticed himself to John Struthers & Sons Marble Works, at that time one of the largest stone carving ventures in the country. He spent four years carving ornament and figures for Philadelphia City Hall, under the direction of sculptor Alexander Milne Calder.

To improve his understanding of anatomy and his skill at carving figures, he began attending night classes at the Spring Garden Institute. He studied under Thomas Eakins at the Pennsylvania Academy of the Fine Arts beginning in 1884, and followed Eakins to the Art Students' League of Philadelphia in 1886. He returned to PAFA the following year, and studied under Thomas Anshutz.

Grafly moved to Paris in 1888, where he studied for a year at the Académie Julian—drawing under Tony Robert-Fleury, painting under William-Adolphe Bouguereau, and sculpture under Henri Chapu. He shared a flat with fellow American art students Robert Henri, Harry Finney, William Hoefeker, and James Randolph Fisher. In 1889 he gained admittance to the École des Beaux Arts, but only stayed one year. He exhibited two ideal busts, Saint John and Daedalus at the Paris Salon of 1890. He exhibited his first major work, a life-size female nude, Mauvais Presage, at the Salon of 1891, which received an Honorable Mention. It is now at the Detroit Institute of Arts.

== Career ==
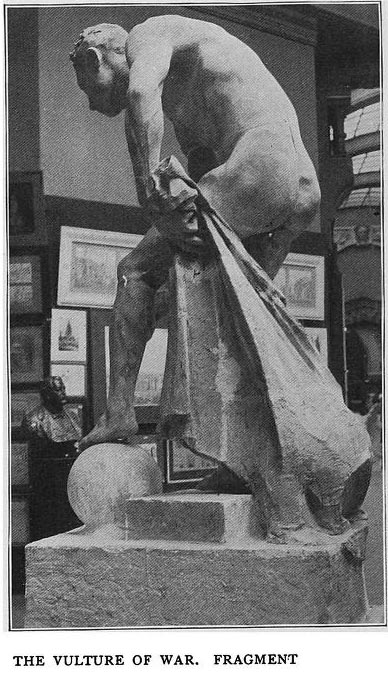
The Vulture of War fragment (1895-96), on exhibit at PAFA in 1898.

The death of his father brought Grafly back to Philadelphia in early 1892, and he began teaching at the Drexel Institute and the Pennsylvania Academy of the Fine Arts. PAFA created the position of "Instructor of Sculpture" for Grafly, and under him the sculpture department was put "on an equal footing with painting for the first time". He took a one-year sabbatical in 1895, to get married and create what he hoped would be his masterpiece.

In Paris, he began work on The Vulture of War, a nightmarish sculpture group depicting carnage and death. It quickly evolved from a two-figure work to a three-figure work, and ultimately a four-figure work. These consisted of the colossal figure of War; who wields the uncomprehending Man as a weapon (swings him like a scythe); a lifeless woman (Death and Destruction); and the sinister figure of Plunder, who holds the globe under his foot. Sculptor Jean Dampt provided Grafly with weekly critiques as the work progressed. Of the four figures, only the plunderer was completed by the end of his sabbatical. Grafly returned to teaching at PAFA in Fall 1896, but continued to work on the sculpture group. A heroic-sized plaster of the plunderer was exhibited at PAFA's 1898 annual exhibition, and was part of Grafly's gold medal-winning exhibit at the 1900 Exposition Universelle in Paris. The plaster was also part of Grafly's exhibit at the 1904 Louisiana Purchase Exposition in St. Louis, but he abandoned it there rather than paying the freight fees to ship it back to Philadelphia.

Grafly was commissioned in 1898 to create two colossal busts for the Smith Memorial Arch, a Civil War monument in Fairmount Park, Philadelphia. Following sculptor William Ordway Partridge's withdrawal, Grafly also created the memorial's 15-foot (4.6 m) statue of General John F. Reynolds.

=== Expositions ===
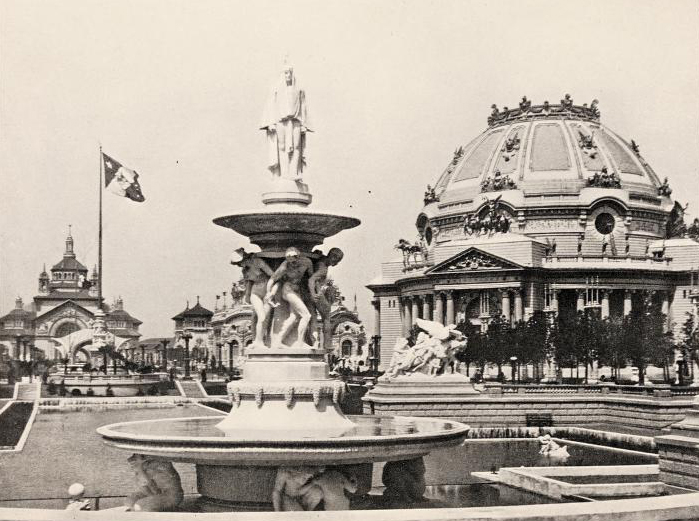
The Fountain of Man (1901), Pan-American Exposition, Buffalo.

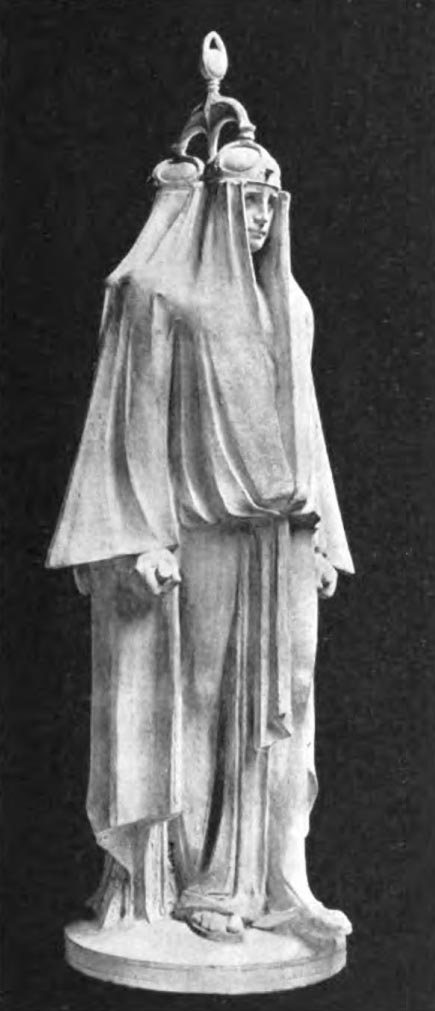
Man, the Mysterious

==== Fountain of Man ====
Grafly and architect Charles Dudley Arnold were commissioned to create a fountain for the 1901 Pan-American Exposition, in Buffalo, New York. The Fountain of Man was crowned by an eerie half-hooded central figure, Man, the Mysterious, with faces on the front and back of his head representing the two natures of Man. Supporting the fountain's upper basin were nude figures representing the 5 senses, and supporting the lower basin were four pairs of crouching male and female atlantes, each couple representing contrasting emotions— love and hate, ambition and despair, etc. Sculptor Lorado Taft wrote:

When opportunity comes, and with it demand for a man's highest abilities, he who has always done his best has himself well in hand. Such an opportunity came to Mr. Grafly at the Pan-American Exposition. While the sculptural decorations of that most charming of fairs were as a rule well suited to their purpose, and contributed much to its beauty, there were few features of striking originality. The one which stands out in memory as of permanent value, as a lasting contribution to the art of this country, is Mr. Grafly's "Fountain of Man".

==== Louisiana Purchase Exposition ====
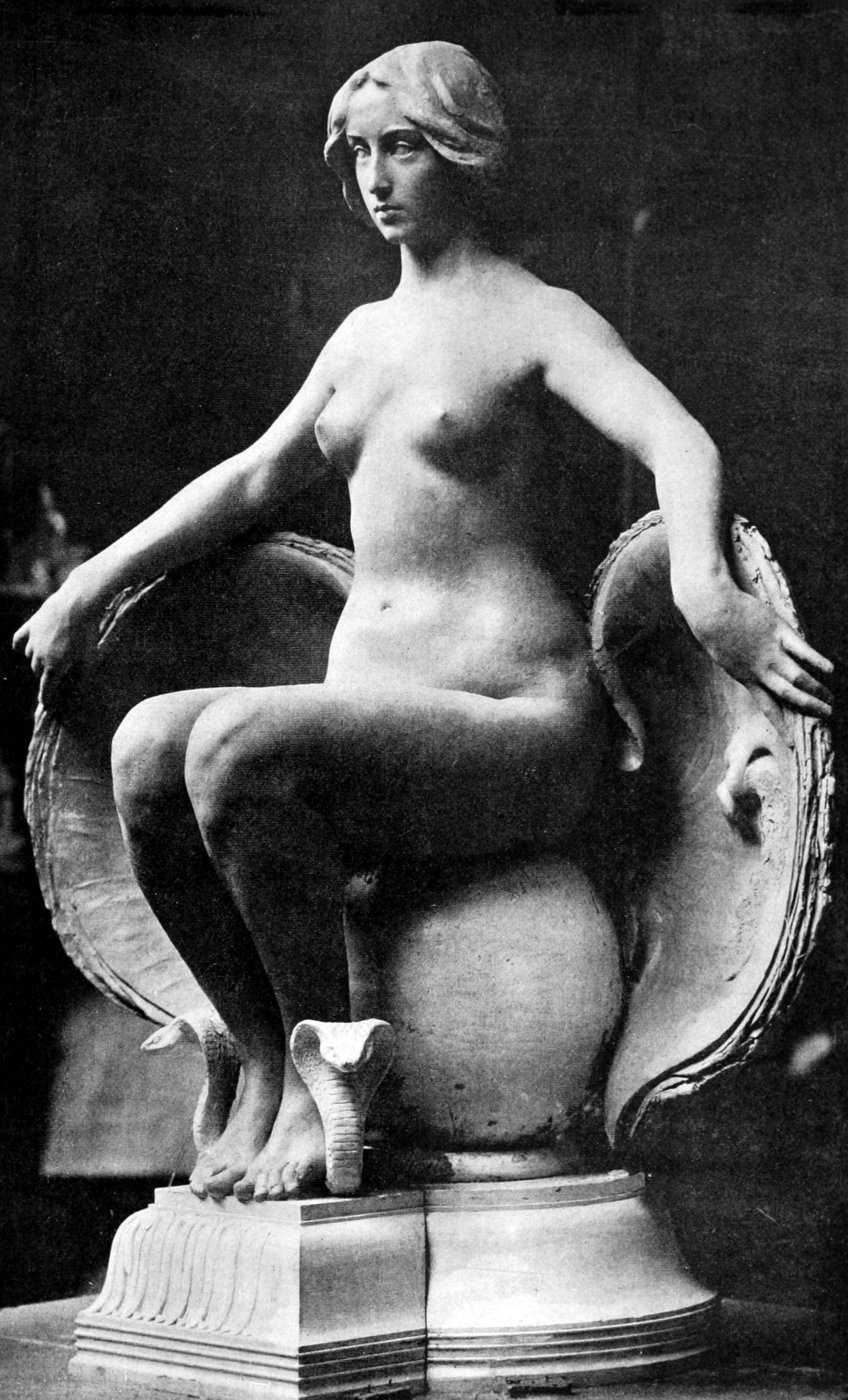
Vérité (1904), Louisiana Purchase Exposition, St. Louis.

Grafly served as a member of the Art Jury for the 1904 Louisiana Purchase Exposition in St. Louis, Missouri, and designed the medal that was awarded to winning artists. Following sculptor John Quincy Adams Ward's withdrawal, Grafly created a heroic-size seated figure of Thomas Jefferson for the Cascade Garden. His Vérité (Truth) was carved in marble, and installed in a niche flanking the main entrance to the Palace of Fine Arts (now the Saint Louis Art Museum). His sculpture group, Electricity, was installed over an entrance to the Palace of Electricity.

==== Pioneer Mother Monument ====
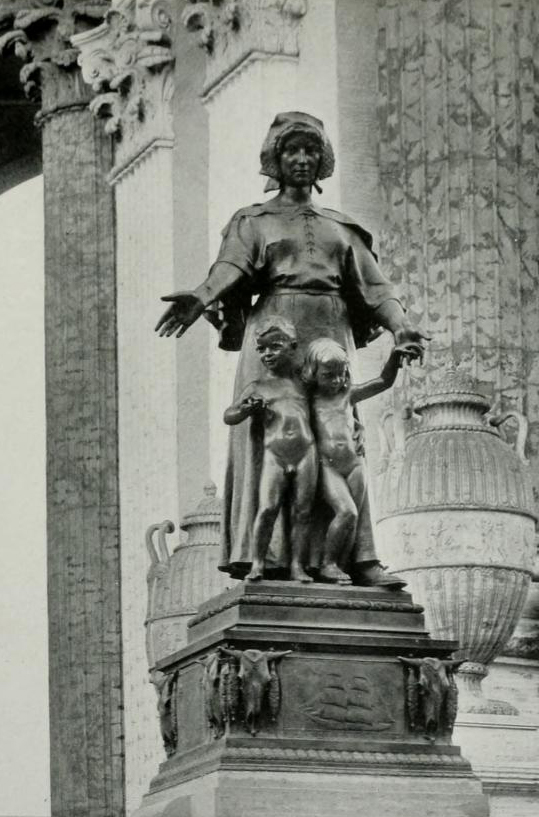
Pioneer Mother Monument (1913–15), Panama-Pacific Exposition, San Francisco.

Grafly's best known sculpture is probably the Pioneer Mother Monument (1913–15), in San Francisco, California. John E. D. Trask, a museum administrator and former managing director of the Pennsylvania Academy of the Fine Arts, headed the Fine Arts Department for the planned 1915 Panama-Pacific Exposition. The Pioneer Mother Monument Association raised $22,500 for the project, and Trask commissioned Grafly to create the sculpture in 1913. Grafly's plaster sketches are preserved at Wichita State University's Ulrich Museum of Art, and an early iteration of the work bordered on comical—a stalwart mother balancing screaming twin infants, one on each arm. Grafly's final model went in another direction, granting the woman and her two naked toddlers a simple dignity. The casting took longer than expected, and the sculpture was not in place for the exhibition's March 2, 1915 opening. Set atop a 26-foot (7.9 m) stepped concrete base, the monument was dedicated on June 30, 1915.

The Pioneer Mother monument, by Charles Grafly, is a permanent bronze, a tribute by the people of the West to the women who laid the foundation of their welfare. It is to stand in the San Francisco Civic Center, where its masterful simplicity will be more impressive than in this colorful colonnade. It is a true addition to noteworthy American works of art and fully expresses the spirit of this courageous motherhood, tender but strong, adventurous but womanly, enduring but not humble. It has escaped every pitfall of mawkishness, stubbornly refused to descend to mere prettiness, and lived up to the noblest possibilities of its theme. The strong hands, the firmly set feet, the clear, broad brow of the Mother and the uncompromisingly simple, sculpturally pure lines of figure and garments are honest and commanding in beauty. The children, too, are modeled with affectionate sincerity and are a realistic interpretation of childish charm. Oxen skulls, pine cones, leaves and cacti decorate the base; the panels show the old sailing vessel, the Golden Gate, and the transcontinental trails.

Relocation of the monument to San Francisco's Civic Center never happened, and the sculpture was rediscovered during the Great Depression, weather-beaten and vandalized, amidst the ruins of the 1915 world's fair. Civic and historical groups, notably the Native Daughters of the Golden West, raised money to restore the sculpture for the 1939 Golden Gate International Exposition. After the exposition, it was installed in Golden Gate Park and rededicated on December 8, 1940.

==== Works exhibited ====
- 1893 World's Columbian Exposition, Chicago, Illinois – portrait bust of Daedalus (bronze), A Bad Omen (plaster). The group was awarded a medal "for excellence".
- 1895 Cotton States and International Exposition, Atlanta, Georgia, Portrait of My Mother. The bust was awarded a silver medal.
- 1900 Exposition Universelle, Paris, France – The Vulture of War, The Symbol of Life, From Generation to Generation, portrait busts of his mother and wife. The group was awarded a gold medal.
- 1901 Pan-American Exposition, Buffalo, New York – The Vulture of War, The Symbol of Life, From Generation to Generation, portrait busts of his mother and wife, an architectural medal for Cornell University. The group was awarded a gold medal.
- 1902 South Carolina Inter-State and West Indian Exposition, Charleston, South Carolina – The Symbol of Life, From Generation to Generation. The group was awarded a gold medal.
- 1904 Louisiana Purchase Exposition, St. Louis, Missouri – The Vulture of War, The Symbol of Life, From Generation to Generation, In Much Wisdom; portrait busts of his wife, Dr. Louis Starr, artist Joseph R. DeCamp, and politician James McManes. Grafly served as a member of the Art Jury. His works were not in competition for awards.
- 1910 Exposition Internacional de Arte del Centenario, Buenos Aires, In Much Wisdom. It was awarded the Grand Prize in Sculpture.
- 1915 Panama-Pacific Exposition, San Francisco, California – Marble Head [Ideal Head of a Woman?], The Oarsman, Maidenhood; portrait busts of W. Elmer Schofield, George Harding, Dr. Joseph Price, Edward W. Redfield, Joseph R. DeCamp, Edwin Swift Clymer, Henry L. Viereck, William M. Paxton and Thomas P. Anshutz. Grafly served as an advisor to the exposition. His works were not in competition for awards.
- 1926 Sesquicentennial Exposition, Philadelphia, Pennsylvania – Aeneas and Anchises, The Symbol of Life, From Generation to Generation, Head of War (Meade Memorial); portrait busts of W. Elmer Schofield, Thomas P. Anshutz, and The Evangelist Felix. Grafly served as director of its Department of Fine Arts and head of the Art Jury. His works were not in competition for awards.

=== Other works ===
==== Portrait busts ====
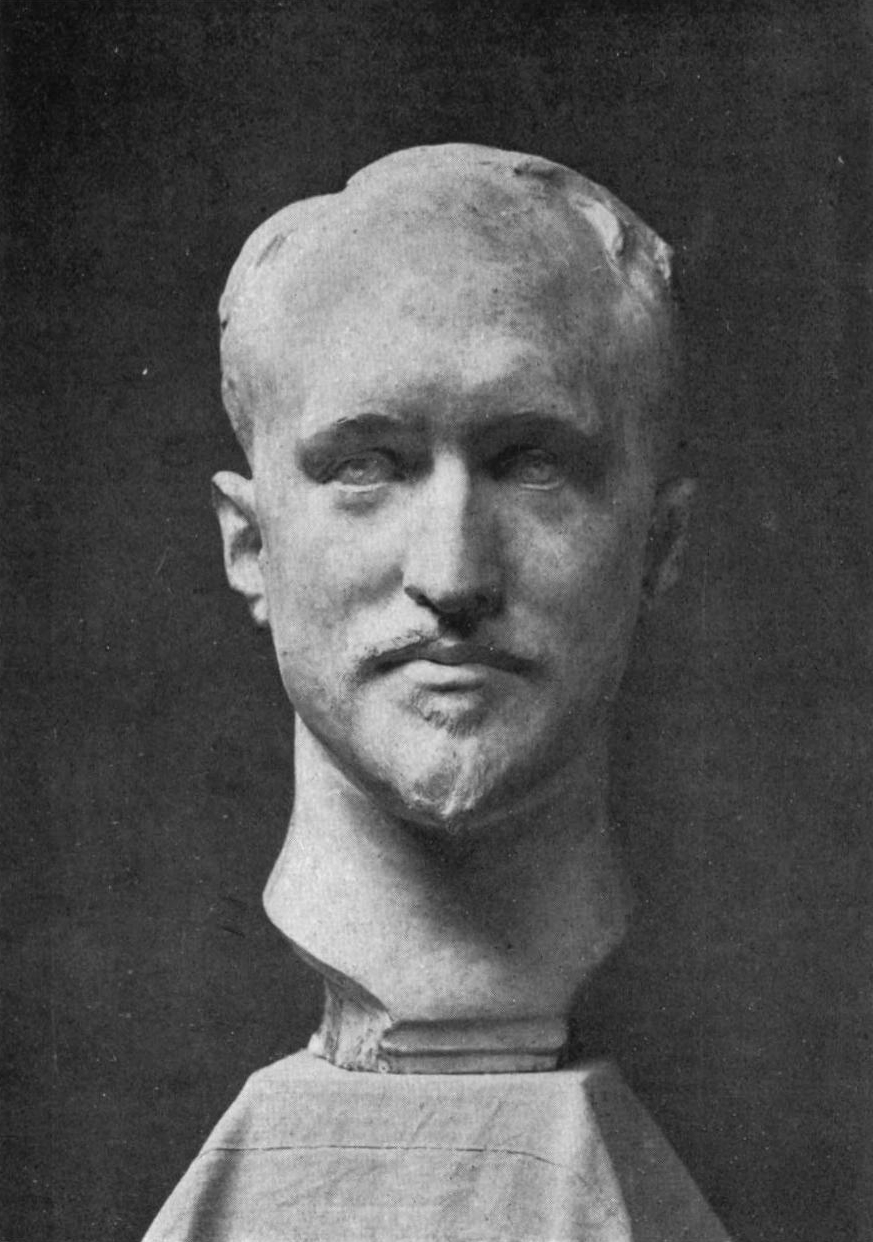
The Entomologist —Henry L. Viereck (1909), PAFA.

Grafly modeled dozens of portrait heads and busts; many as commissions, but also of friends and family members. In 1898, he modeled a bust of Hugh H. Breckenridge, the first in what became a three-decade series of busts of fellow artists. The sitter sometimes painted a portrait of Grafly in exchange. Lorado Taft claimed "there is no sculptor in this country who can make a finer bust". Critic Helen W. Henderson wrote:

The bust of Henry Lorenz Viereck, entomologist, is the unique work of Charles Grafly in Washington. [D.C.] It is owned by the sitter. This bust, made about 1908, is one of the most successful of that series of portrait busts commenced by the sculptor a few years ago, and including at the present time, many distinguished artists, doctors, and specialists in other fields. In the department of portrait busts Grafly stands unrivalled in his generation. The head of Viereck is extremely typical of the quality and character of the sculptor's achievement.

In the 1920s, Grafly created four busts of historical figures for the Hall of Fame for Great Americans, in Bronx, New York City.

==== New York Custom House ====
Grafly modeled two of the colossal figures for the façade of the Alexander Hamilton U.S. Custom House in Manhattan, New York City. His allegorical figure of England (1903–07) depicts a young Queen Victoria dressed in armor, holding the wand of Hermes and accompanied by the shield of St. George and a ship's wheel. His allegorical figure of France (1904–07) depicts a goddess crowned with a laurel wreath, holding a sceptre, a sheaf of wheat and a bronze statuette representing the Fine Arts, and accompanied by a Gallic rooster and a herm of the ancient god Dusios. Both figures were carved in limestone by the Piccirilli Brothers.

==== Meade Memorial ====
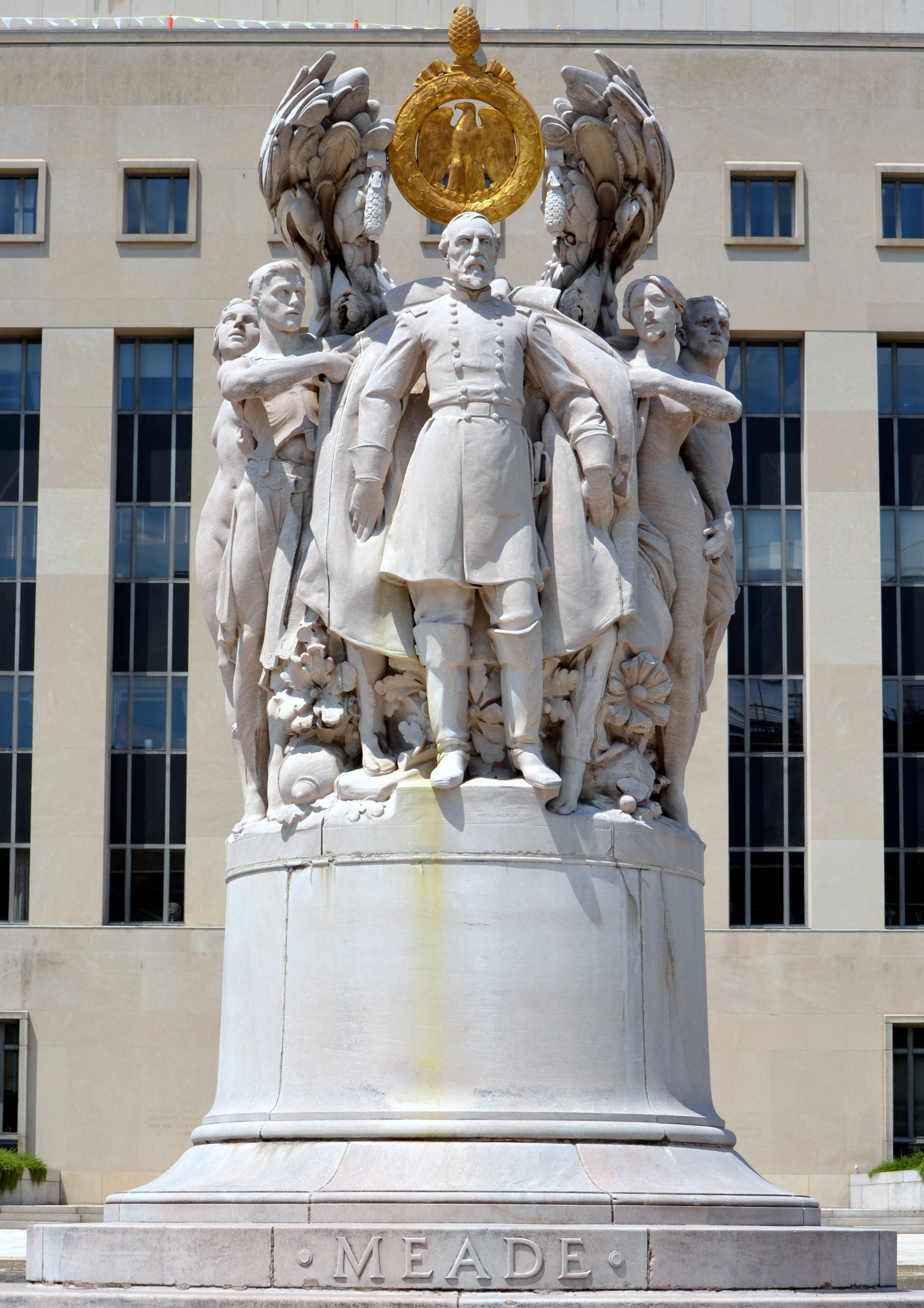
General George Gordon Meade Memorial (1915-27), Washington, D.C.

The most prestigious commission of Grafly's career was the Major General George Gordon Meade Memorial (1915–27), a monument for the National Mall in Washington, D.C. General Meade (1815–1872) had been commander of the decisive Union victory at Gettysburg, and the memorial was the gift of Pennsylvania to the nation. It was originally installed south of Pennsylvania Avenue, between 2nd and 3rd Streets NW—a site now mostly covered by the Capitol Reflecting Pool. This was opposite and slightly north of the Ulysses S. Grant Memorial.

On January 21, 1915, President Woodrow Wilson signed a joint resolution of Congress creating the federal commission for the Meade Memorial. On November 23, 1915, the commission chose Grafly as sculptor and Simon & Bassett (later Simon & Simon) as architects for the project. Grafly's sculpture program went through several iterations before it was granted preliminary approval by the D.C. Commission of Fine Arts, three years later. His design mixed the literal, the allegorical and the fantastical, and was granted final approval in January 1922.

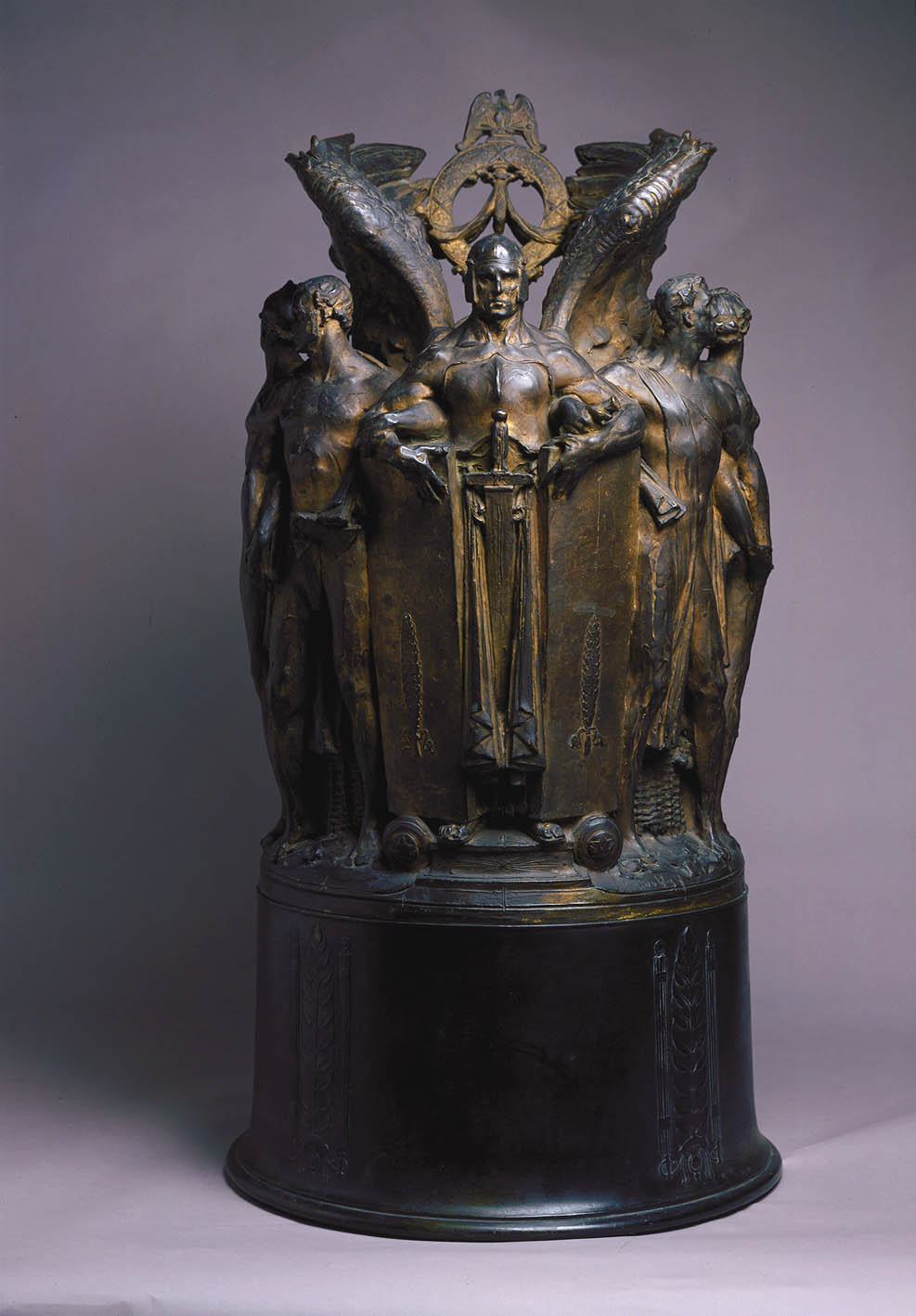
Preliminary model for the Meade Memorial (1915-25).

The memorial features eight figures grouped in a circle. The primary figure of General Meade, dressed in his Civil War uniform, faces south. He is flanked by six nude allegorical figures – Loyalty, Fame and Energy on the west side; Chivalry, Progress and Military Courage on the east side – representing qualities that Grafly "believed were necessary for the character of a great general". Facing north is the dark angel of War, "unchanged since war first ravaged the world", who wears a helmet, breastplate and cape, and before whom stands a knightly sword, ready to be taken up when necessary. "War... holds in his grim clutch two memorial tablets [on which are listed Meade's military battles]. His wings, in long sweeping curves, stretch toward the standard held by Loyalty... The side groups are thus outlined against the ominous shadow of the wings of War." Loyalty and Chivalry remove General Meade's "cloak of battle". "Loyalty also raises aloft over Meade's head a standard [ Legion eagle ] of wreaths and garlands, in commemoration of great achievement."

The Piccirilli Brothers carved the figures from white Tennessee marble. The cylindrical base is gray granite, and its stepped circular platform is Milford pink granite. The memorial was dedicated on October 19, 1927.

The Meade Memorial was dismantled in 1969, to make way for excavation of the 3rd Street Tunnel under the National Mall and construction of the Capitol Reflecting Pool. Following fourteen years in storage, the memorial underwent restoration, and was installed on the entrance plaza of the E. Barrett Prettyman United States Courthouse in 1983, one block northwest of its original site.

==== Pennypacker Memorial ====
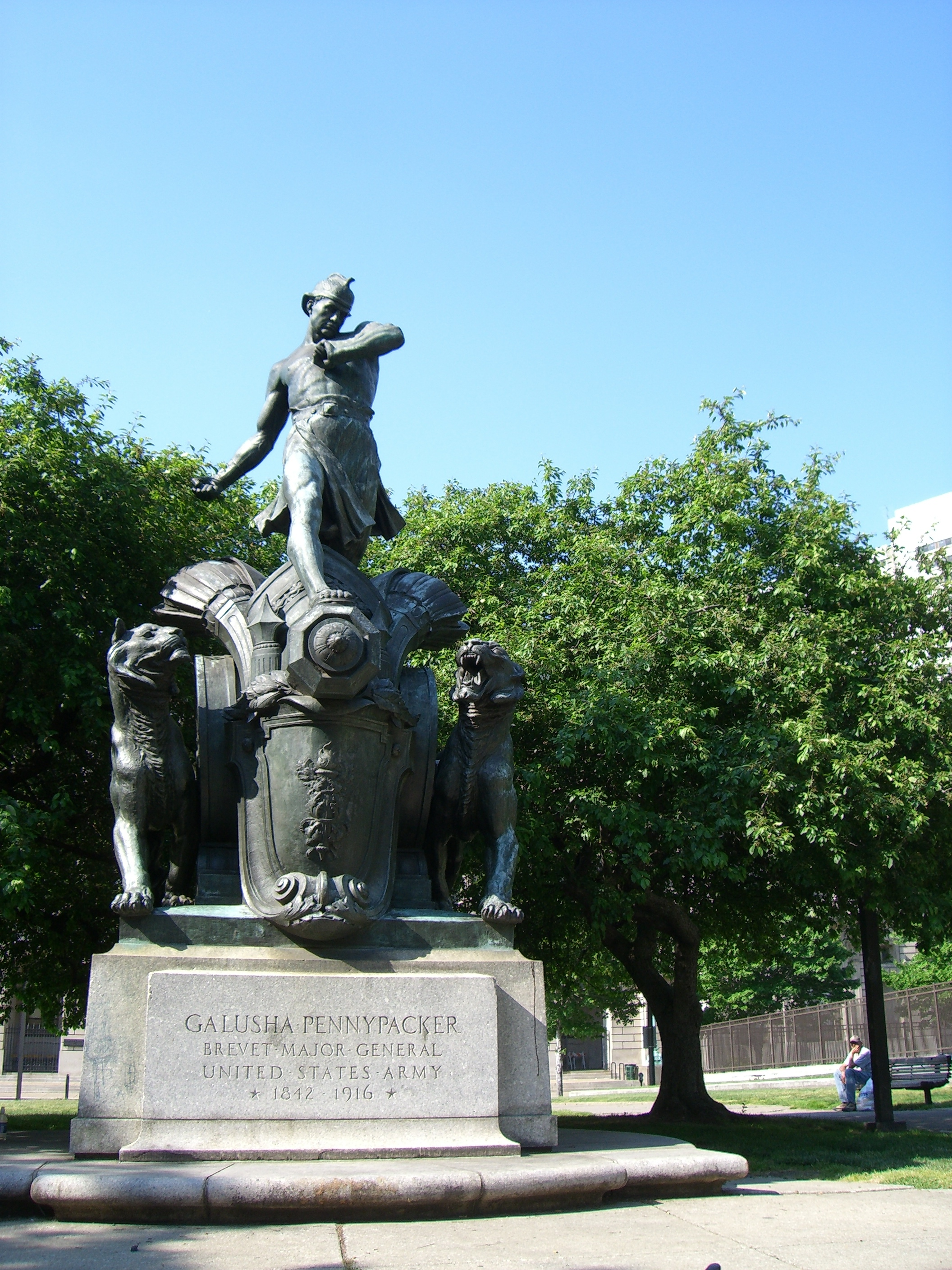
General Galusha Pennypacker Memorial, Philadelphia, completed by Albert Laessle

Grafly was commissioned to create a memorial to Major General Galusha Pennypacker for Logan Square, Philadelphia. A valorous Civil War officer, Pennypacker had been promoted to general at age 22. Grafly's concept was to depict him in the prime of his manhood—as a burly, bare-chested Roman general, flanked by tigers and straddling a chariot-like cannon. Grafly invited his former student Albert Laessle to model the tigers, and worked on the project, 1921–26, before setting it aside to complete the Meade Memorial. In 1934, five years after Grafly's death, Laessle completed the Pennypacker Memorial based on his teacher's designs.

=== Other honors ===
The Pennsylvania Academy of the Fine Arts awarded Grafly its 1899 Converse Gold Medal of Honor "for distinguished services to art and to the Academy". The National Sculpture Society awarded him its 1905 J. Q. A. Ward Prize. At its 1913 annual exhibition, PAFA awarded him the first Widener Gold Medal for Sculpture for his portrait bust of Thomas Anshutz. The Philadelphia Water Color Club awarded him its 1916 Lea First Prize (for drawing). The National Academy of Design awarded him its 1919 Watrous Gold Medal, for his portrait bust of Childe Hassam. The Chicago Art Institute awarded him its 1921 Potter Palmer Gold Medal for his portrait bust of Frank Duveneck, and the Concord Art Association awarded him its 1922 Medal of Honor for the same work.

Grafly was a founding member of the National Sculpture Society (1893), served on its council, and was later elected a Fellow. He was elected an Associate of the National Academy of Design in 1902, and an Academician in 1905. (Robert Henri painted Grafly's NAD diploma portrait.) He was a member of the Philadelphia Art Club, the Architectural League of New York, the National Institute of Arts and Letters, and other arts organizations.

== Personal ==
Grafly married Frances Sekeles of Corinth, Mississippi, on June 7, 1895. They had one daughter, Dorothy (1896–1980), born in Paris during his sabbatical from PAFA. The Graflys lived at 2140 N. 12th Street, Philadelphia, and he had a studio at 2200 Arch Street.

In 1905, Grafly bought property in Lanesville, Gloucester, Massachusetts, and built a house and studio that he named "Fool's Paradise". Favored PAFA students were invited to visit and use his studio. Following the 1917 death of sculptor Bela Pratt, Grafly taught (additionally) at the School of the Museum of Fine Arts, Boston. He made "Fool's Paradise" his residence year-round, and commuted to Philadelphia or Boston by train.

Grafly's protégé, Walker Hancock, considered him "the pre-eminent instructor of sculpture in this country", and came to PAFA in 1920 specifically to study under him. Hancock won awards for his work as a student, two traveling scholarships and, after graduation, the 1925 Prix de Rome in sculpture. In April 1929, on the day Hancock returned to Philadelphia from the American Academy in Rome, he heard the news—Grafly had been struck by a hit-and-run driver the night before.

During the ensuing days, even though he was gradually failing, we had the opportunity to talk about things that concerned him. Two things were very much on his mind. He asked me to make sure that the wreath behind the head of General Meade in the Meade Memorial in Washington would be freshly gilded. His other worry was that the landscaping around his statue of James Buchanan in Lancaster, Pennsylvania, had not been carried out. He wanted me to see that this was done.
In the period of his hospitalization and suffering, Grafly told Mr. [John Andrew] Myers [Director of PAFA] that he wanted me to take his place as instructor of sculpture at the Pennsylvania Academy. He lived only two weeks after the accident.

Hancock was among those who eulogized Grafly at his memorial service. The pall bearers at his funeral included former students Albert Laessle and Albin Polasek; and artists Hugh Breckenridge, Edward Redfield, Robert Henri and Albert Rosenthal.

=== Legacy ===
Except for his sabbatical in 1895–96, Grafly taught at PAFA from 1892 to his death in 1929. Among his students were sculptors Eugene Castello, Nancy Coonsman, George Demetrios, Hazel Brill Jackson, Meta Vaux Warrick Fuller, Walker Hancock, Charles Harley, Albert Laessle, Paul Manship, Eleanor Mary Mellon, Louis Milione, Albin Polasek, Dudley Pratt, Lawrence Tenney Stevens, and Katherine Lane Weems.

The collection of the Pennsylvania Academy of the Fine Arts includes about twenty Grafly bronzes. The Ulrich Museum of Art at Wichita State University possesses more than two hundred of his works, mostly plaster casts, a bequest of Dorothy Grafly Drummond (the artist's daughter).

Dorothy Grafly became an art critic and author. Her 1929 biography of her father, The Sculptor's Clay: Charles Grafly (1862–1929), was reissued by Wichita State University in 1996.

== Selected works ==
- Aeneas and Anchises (1893), Delaware Art Museum, Wilmington, Delaware. The sculpture depicts Aeneas carrying his aged father, Anchises, out of the burning city of Troy.
- The Vulture of War (1895–99), Pennsylvania Academy of the Fine Arts, Philadelphia, Pennsylvania.
- The Symbol of Life (1897), Pennsylvania Academy of the Fine Arts, Philadelphia, Pennsylvania. The young man leans on a scythe; the young woman holds an orb from which grows a stalk of wheat.
- From Generation to Generation (1897–98), Pennsylvania Academy of the Fine Arts, Philadelphia, Pennsylvania. A youth and an old man walking side by side past a winged zodiac clock.
- Smith Memorial Arch, West Fairmount Park, Philadelphia, Pennsylvania.
  - Bust of Admiral David Dixon Porter (1898–1901)
  - Bust of John B. Gest (1901)
  - General John F. Reynolds (1901–02)
- Fountain of Man (1901), Pan-American Exposition, Buffalo, New York.
- In Much Wisdom (1902), Pennsylvania Academy of the Fine Arts. A nude, helmeted goddess stands with a snake draped over her shoulders, looking into a hand mirror.
- Vérité (Truth) (1904), Saint Louis Art Museum, St. Louis, Missouri.
- Mother and Child (1905, cast in bronze 1989), Charles Grafly Sculpture Garden, Wichita State University.
- Maidenhood (1906), Pennsylvania Academy of the Fine Arts. An anatomical study, it was part of Grafly's exhibit at the 1915 Panama-Pacific Exposition.
- U.S. Custom House, Manhattan, New York City, Cass Gilbert, architect.
  - Allegorical figure of England (1903–07)
  - Allegorical figure of France (1904–07)
- Ideal Head of a Woman (1908), Ulrich Museum of Art, Wichita State University.
- The Oarsman (1910), Pennsylvania Academy of the Fine Arts. Modeled at Grafly's Lanesville studio, probably as an anatomical study, it was part of his exhibit at the 1915 Panama-Pacific Exposition.
- Pioneer Mother Monument (1913–15), Golden Gate Park, San Francisco, California.
- James Buchanan (1924–28), Buchanan Park, Lancaster, Pennsylvania.
- Major General George Gordon Meade Memorial (1927), E. Barrett Prettyman Federal Courthouse, Washington, D.C.
  - Head of War (1921), Whitney Museum of American Art, New York City. Another cast is at the Art Institute of Chicago.
  - Head of Chivalry (1927), Smithsonian American Art Museum.
- Major General Galusha Pennypacker Memorial (1921–34), Logan Circle, Philadelphia, Pennsylvania. Albert Laessle completed the monument from Grafly's designs.
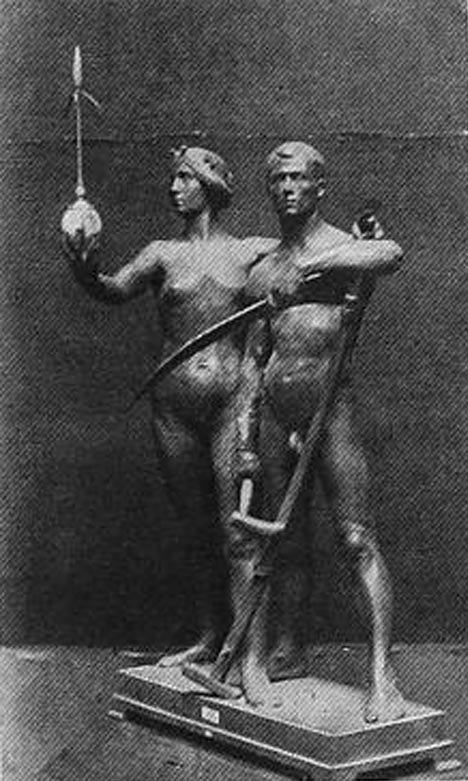
The Symbol of Life (1897), PAFA.

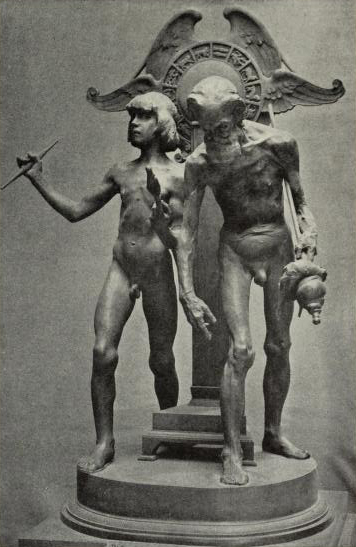
From Generation to Generation (1897–98), PAFA.

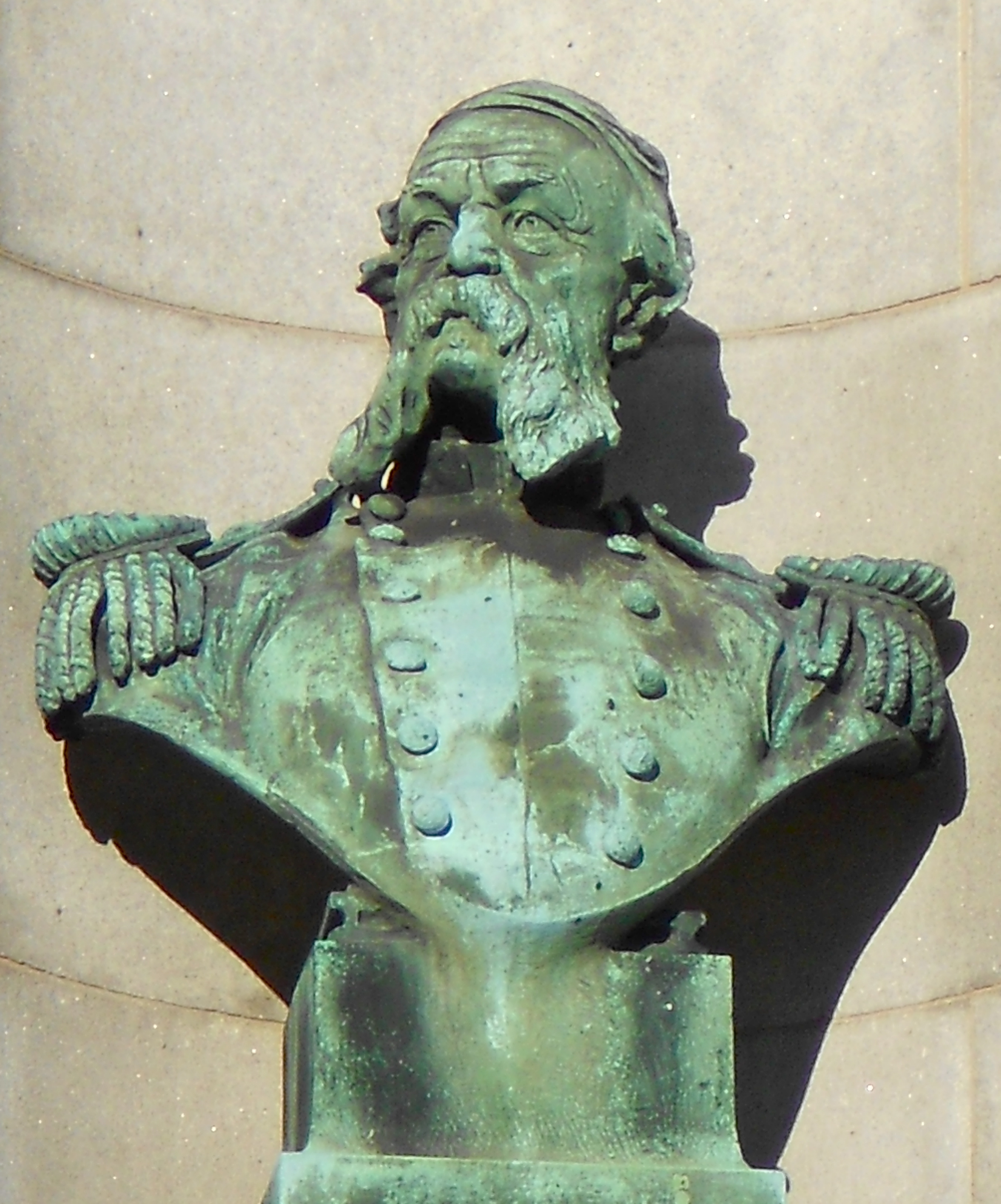
Admiral David Dixon Porter (1898–1901), Smith Memorial Arch, Philadelphia.

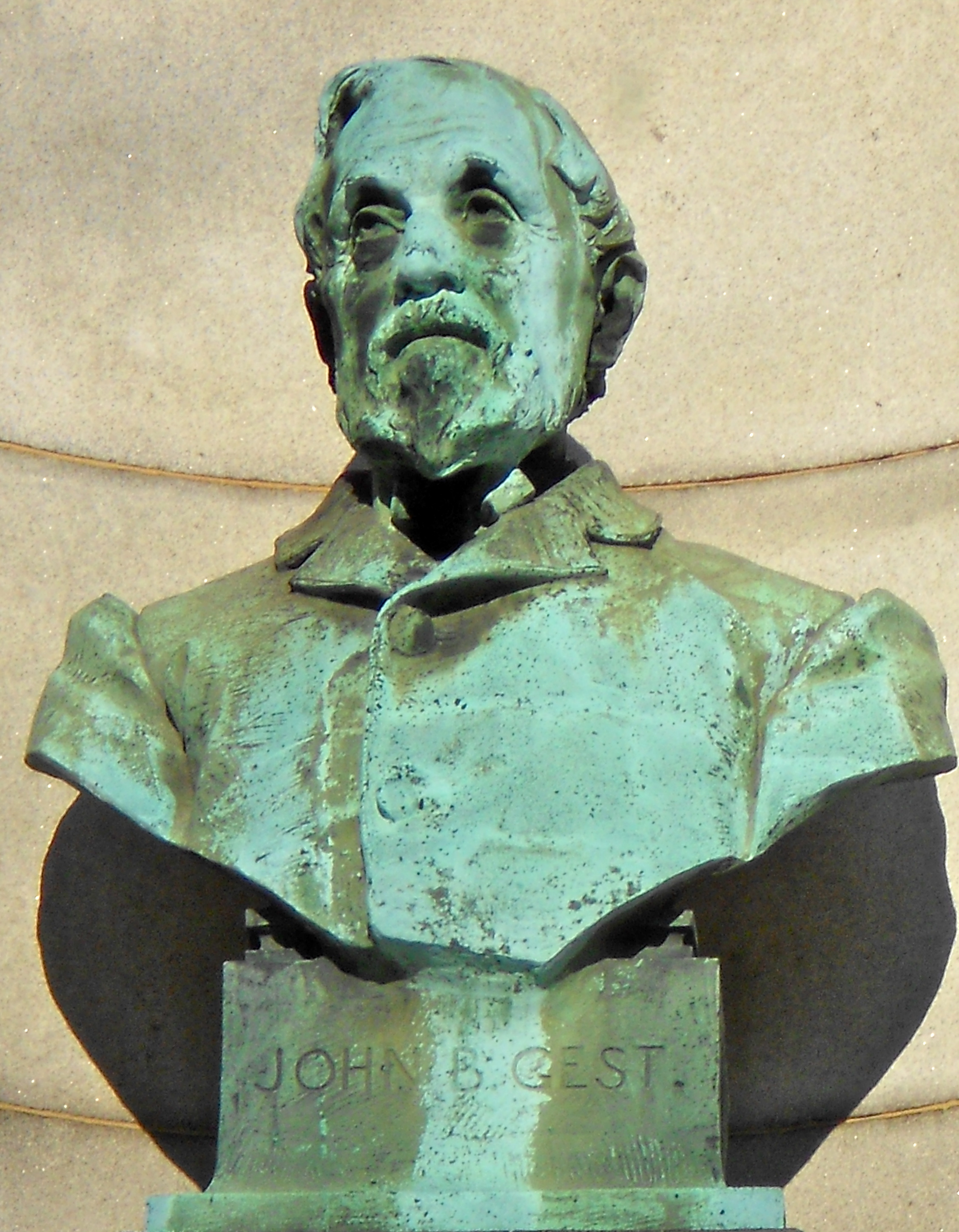
John B. Gest (1898-1901), Smith Memorial Arch, Philadelphia.

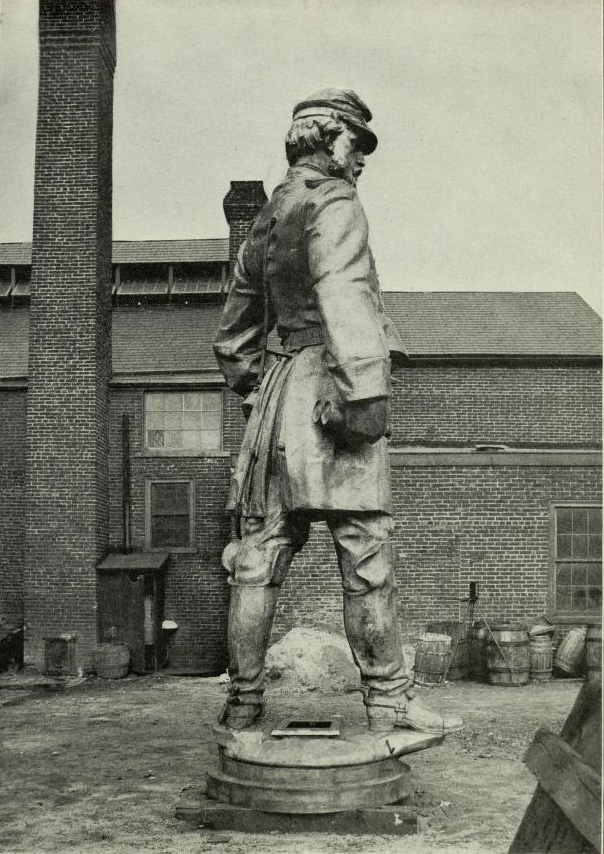
General John F. Reynolds (1901–02), Smith Memorial Arch, Philadelphia.

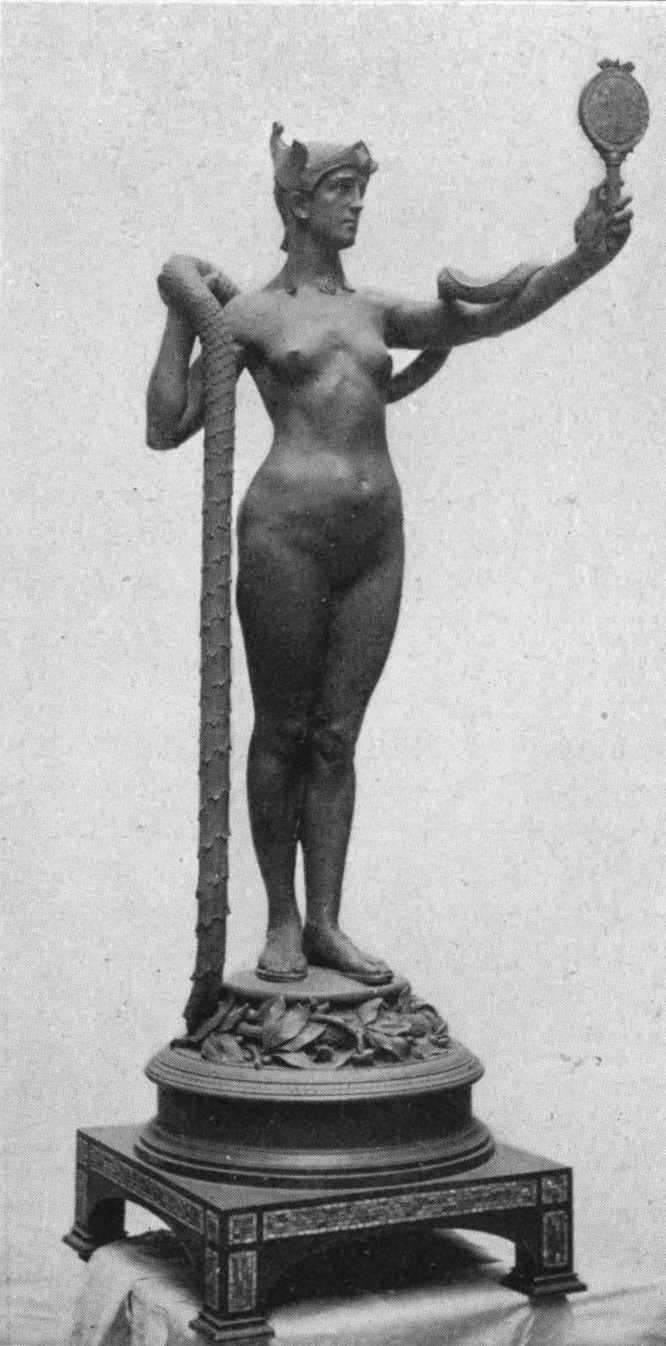
In Much Wisdom (1902), PAFA.

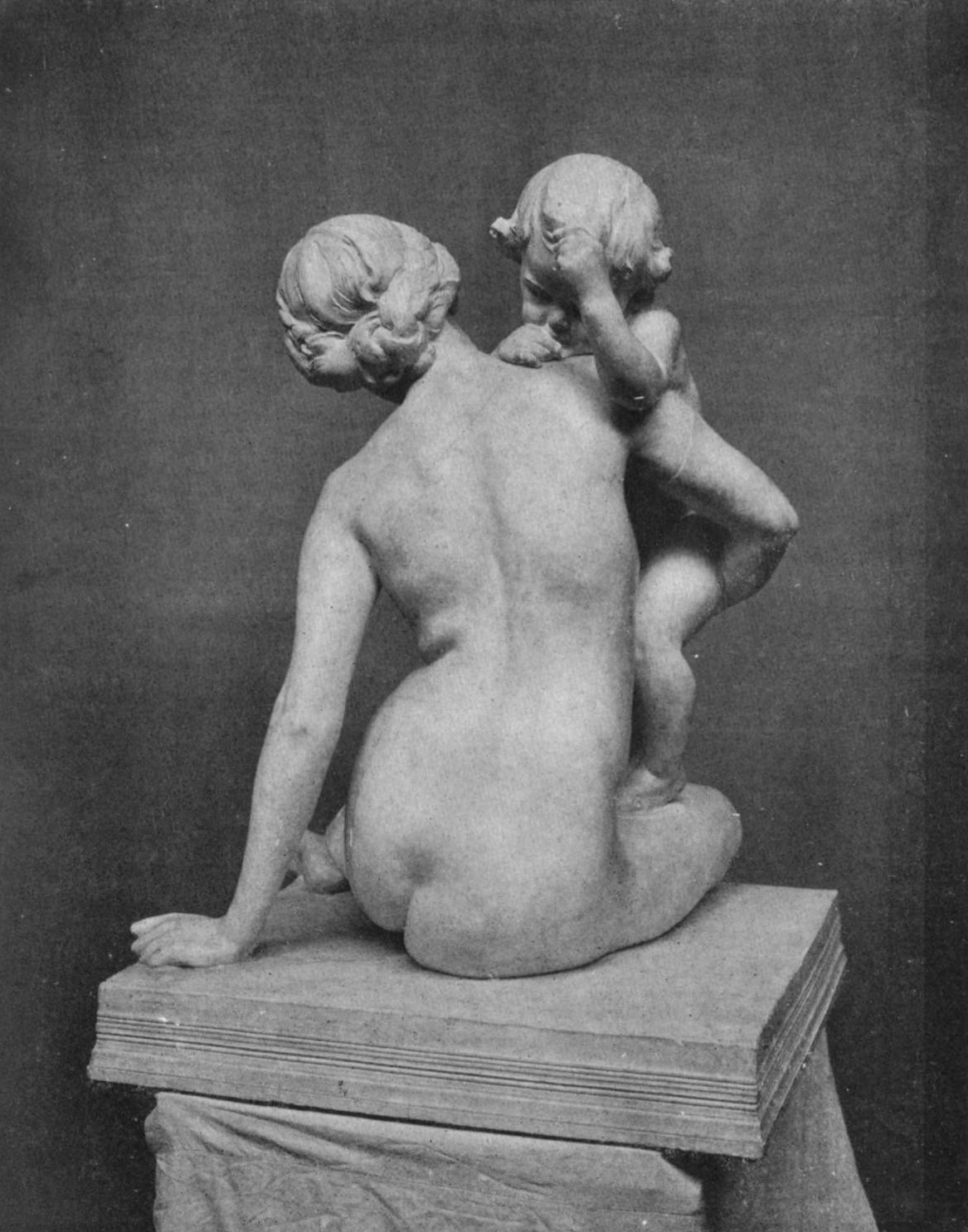
Mother and Child (1905), Wichita State University.

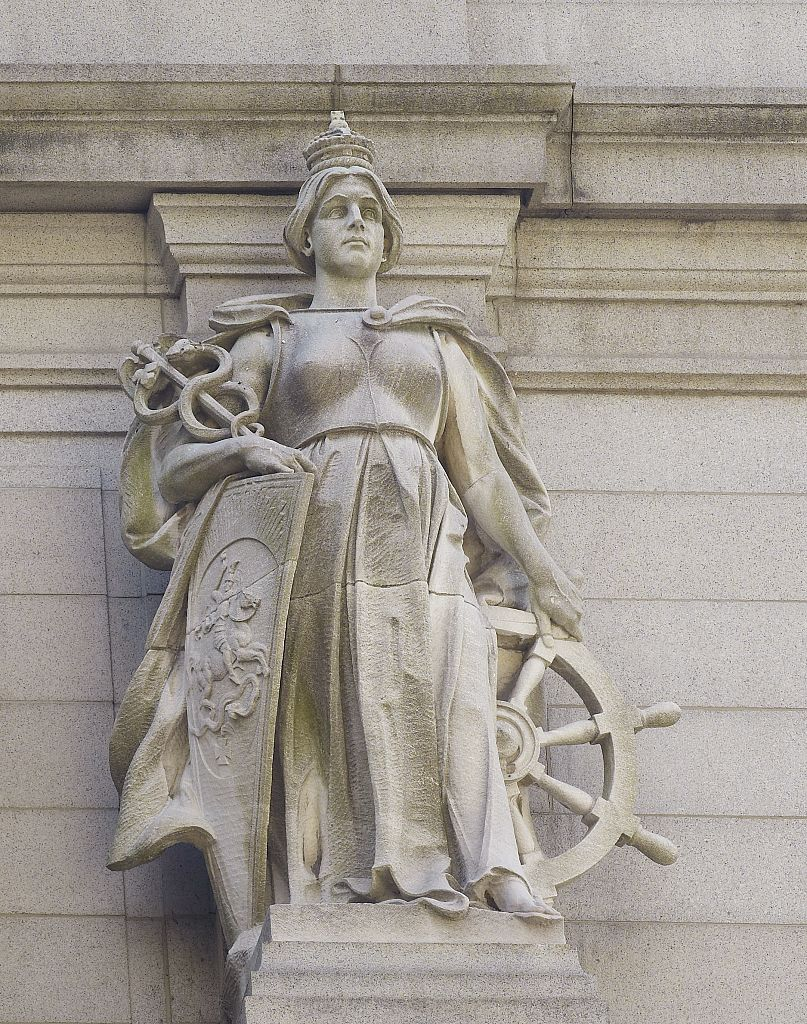
England (1903–07), Alexander Hamilton U.S. Custom House, New York City.

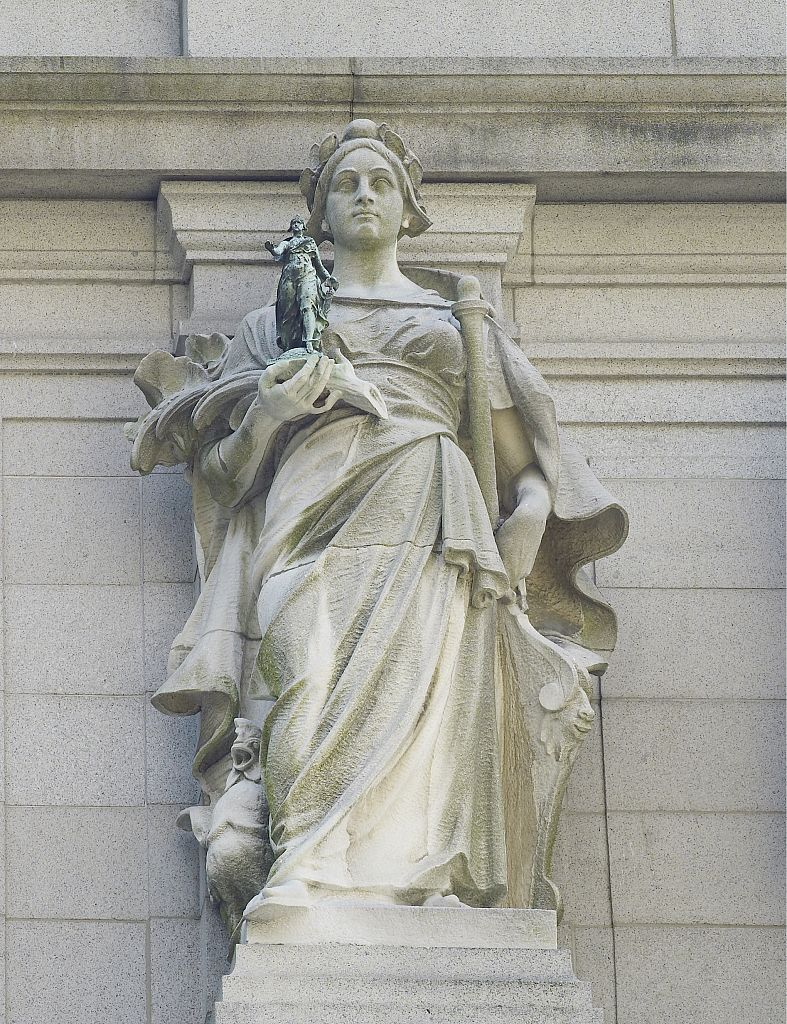
France (1904–07), Alexander Hamilton U.S. Custom House, New York City.

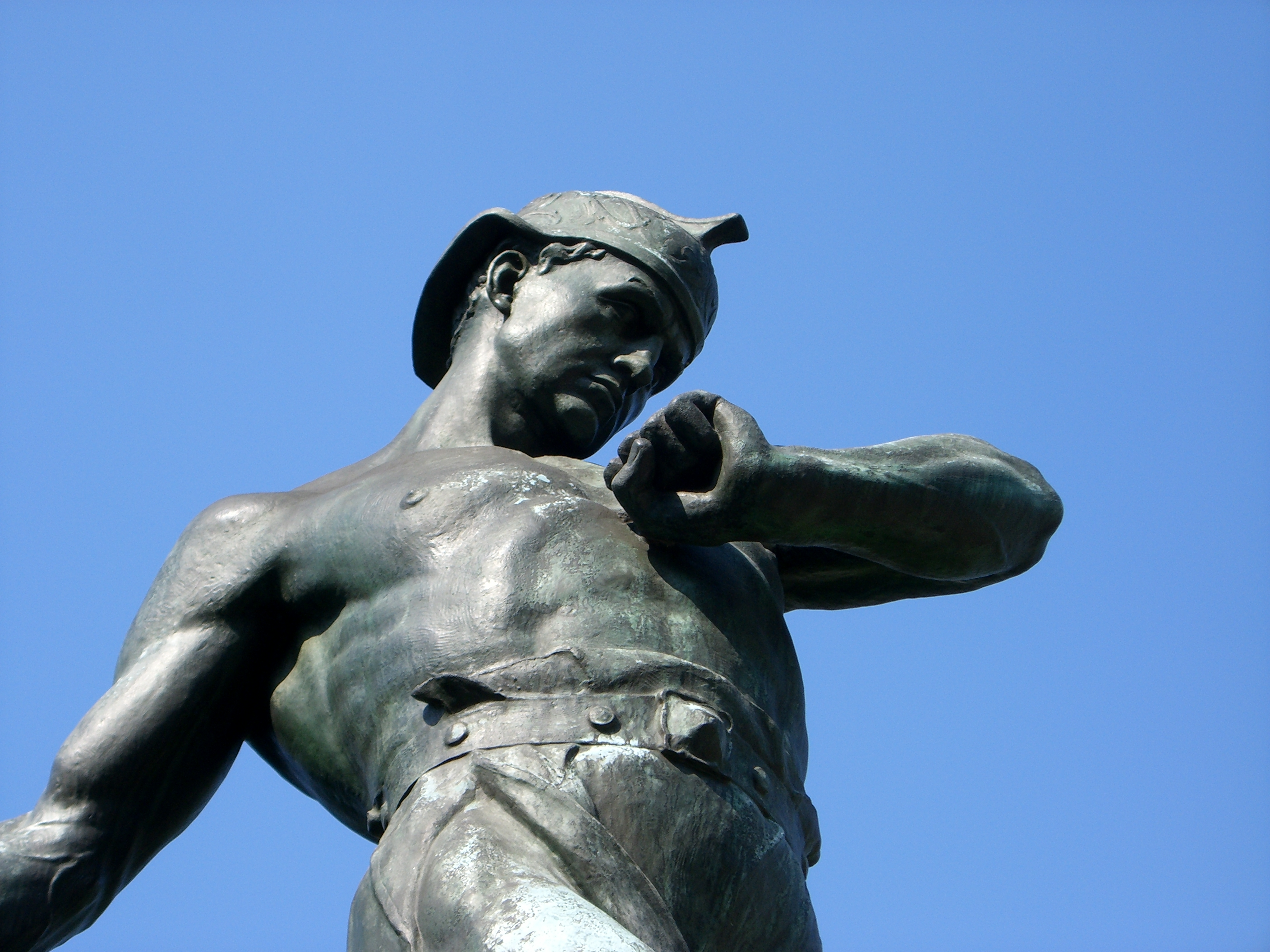
Major General Galusha Pennypacker Memorial (1921–34), Logan Circle, Philadelphia, completed by Albert Laessle.

=== Portrait busts ===
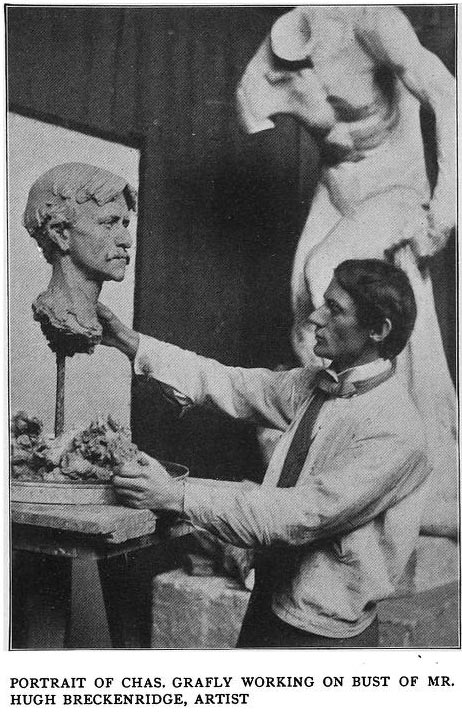
Grafly at work on his bust of Hugh H. Breckenridge, (c.1898). Note the unfinished Vulture of War fragment in the background.

- Daedalus (1890), Pennsylvania Academy of the Fine Arts. Exhibited at the Paris Salon of 1890. Exhibited at PAFA in 1891, and purchased by the Temple Fund.
- My Mother – Bust of Elizabeth Grafly (1892, cast in bronze 1990), Charles Grafly Sculpture Garden, Wichita State University.
- Icarus (1894, cast in bronze 1973), Charles Grafly Sculpture Garden, Wichita State University.
- Henry O. Tanner (1896), Metropolitan Museum of Art, New York City.
- Hugh H. Breckenridge (1898), Pennsylvania Academy of the Fine Arts.
- Joseph R. DeCamp (1902), Philadelphia Museum of Art.
- Edward Hornor Coates (1903), Pennsylvania Academy of the Fine Arts.
- W. Elmer Schofield (1905), National Academy of Design, New York City.
- The Surgeon—Portrait of Joseph Price (1906), Pennsylvania Academy of the Fine Arts.
- Emily Clayton Bishop (1907), Pennsylvania Academy of the Fine Arts.
- Edward W. Redfield (1909), National Gallery of Art, Washington, D.C.
- William M. Paxton (1909), Museum of Fine Arts Boston.
- The Entomologist—Portrait of Henry L. Viereck (1909), Pennsylvania Academy of the Fine Arts.
- Henry Charles Lea (1910), Library Company of Philadelphia.
- Thomas P. Anshutz (1912), Pennsylvania Academy of the Fine Arts. Awarded PAFA's first Widener Gold Medal, in 1913.
- Frank Duveneck (1915), National Portrait Gallery, Washington, D.C.
- Paul Wayland Bartlett (1916), National Academy of Design, New York City.
- Childe Hassam (1918), Philadelphia Museum of Art.
- Morris Gray (1923), Metropolitan Museum of Art, New York City.

==== Hall of Fame for Great Americans, Bronx, New York City ====
- James Buchanan Eads (1924)
- Jonathan Edwards (1926)
- David Glasgow Farragut (1927)
- John Paul Jones (1928)
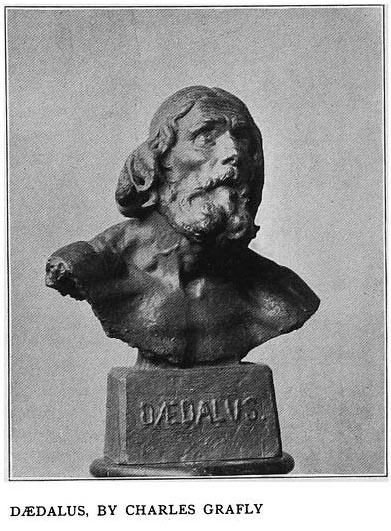
Daedalus (1890), PAFA

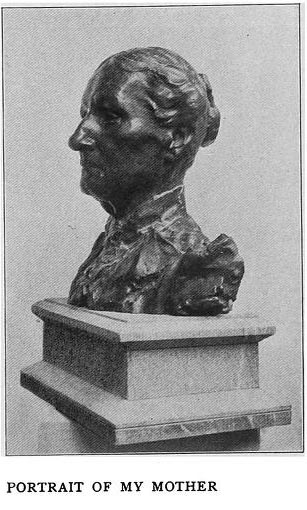
Portrait of My Mother (1892)

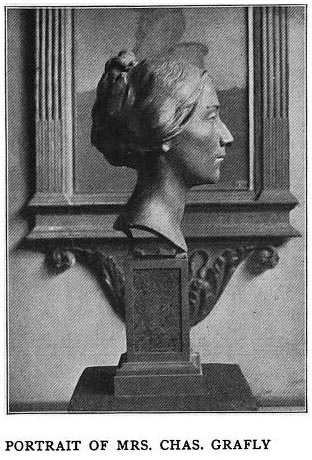
Portrait of Mrs. Grafly (1895)

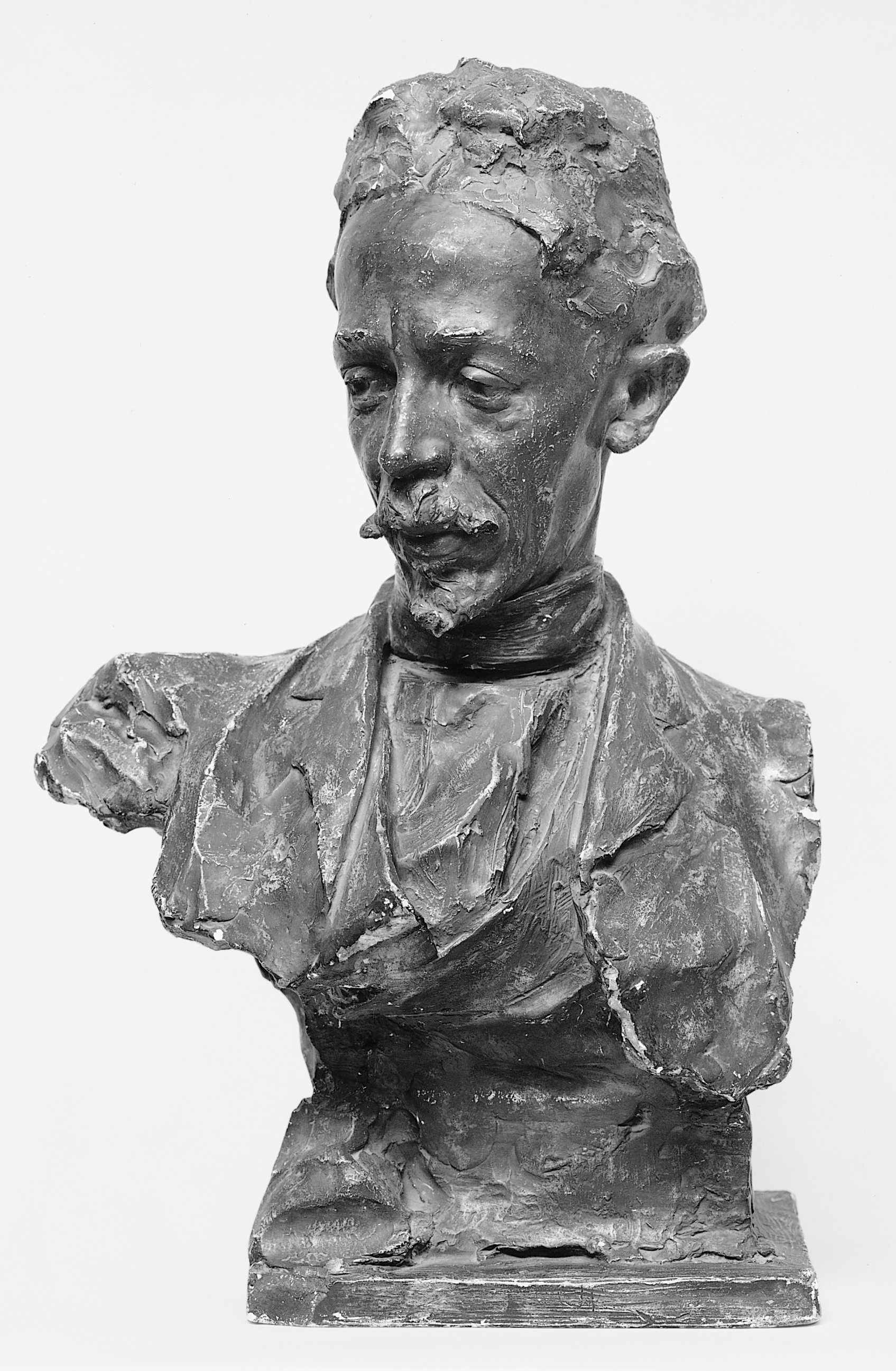
Henry O. Tanner (1896), Metropolitan Museum of Art

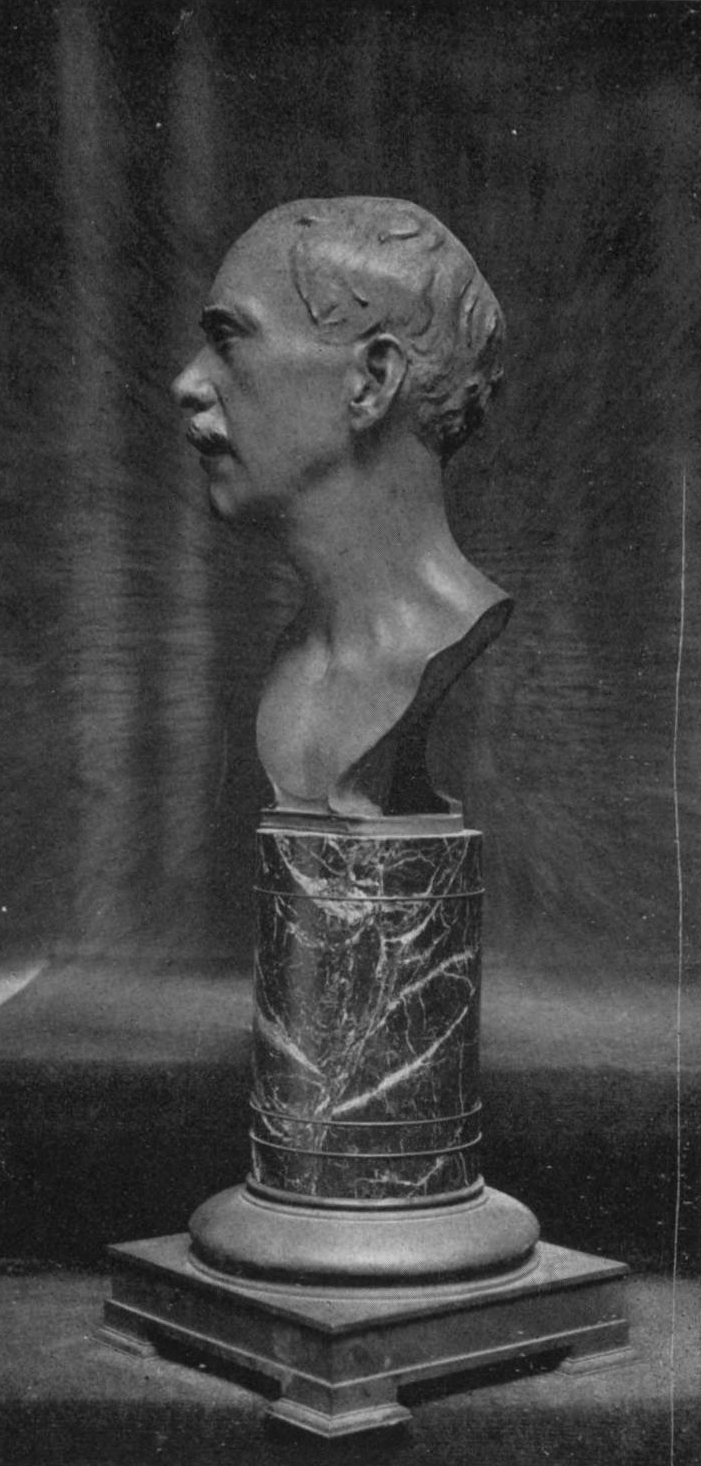
Joseph R. DeCamp (1902), Philadelphia Museum of Art

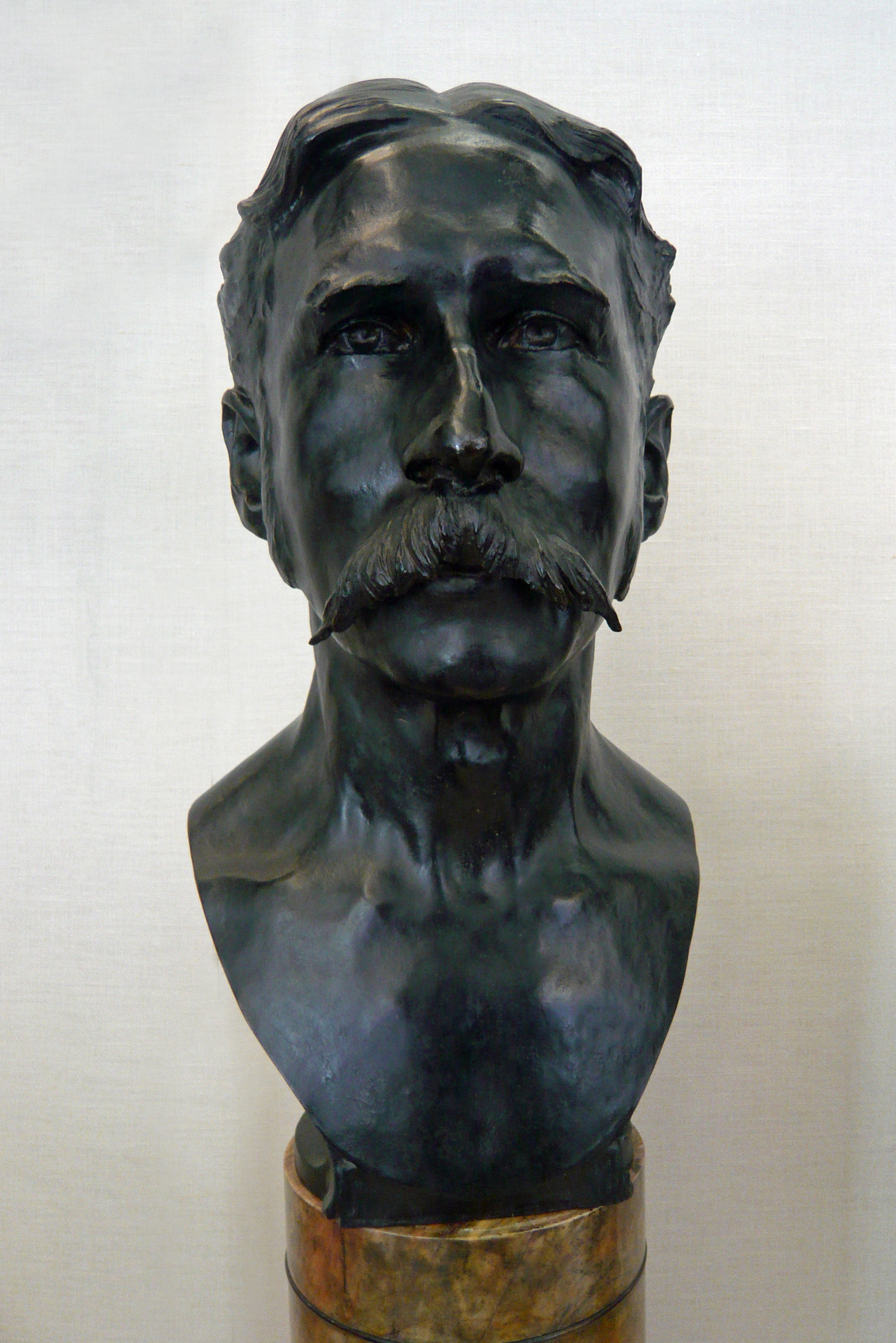
Edward Hornor Coates (1903), PAFA

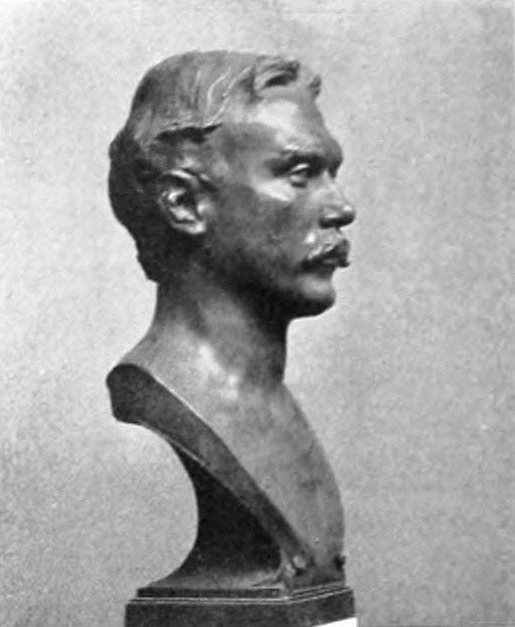
W. Elmer Schofield (1905), National Academy of Design

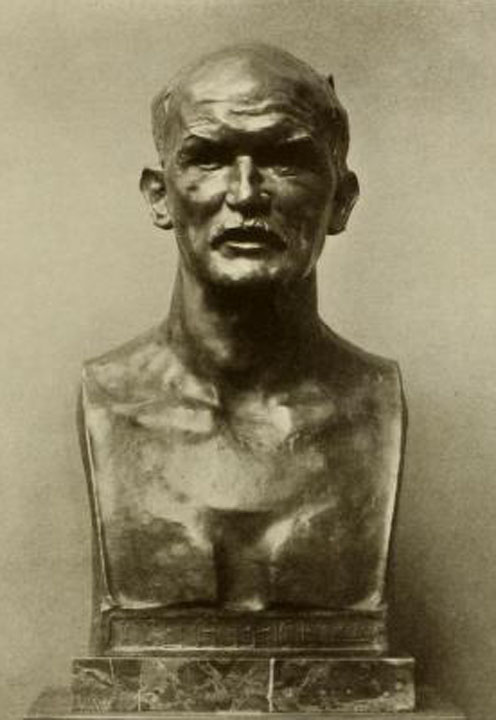
Dr. Joseph Price (1906), PAFA

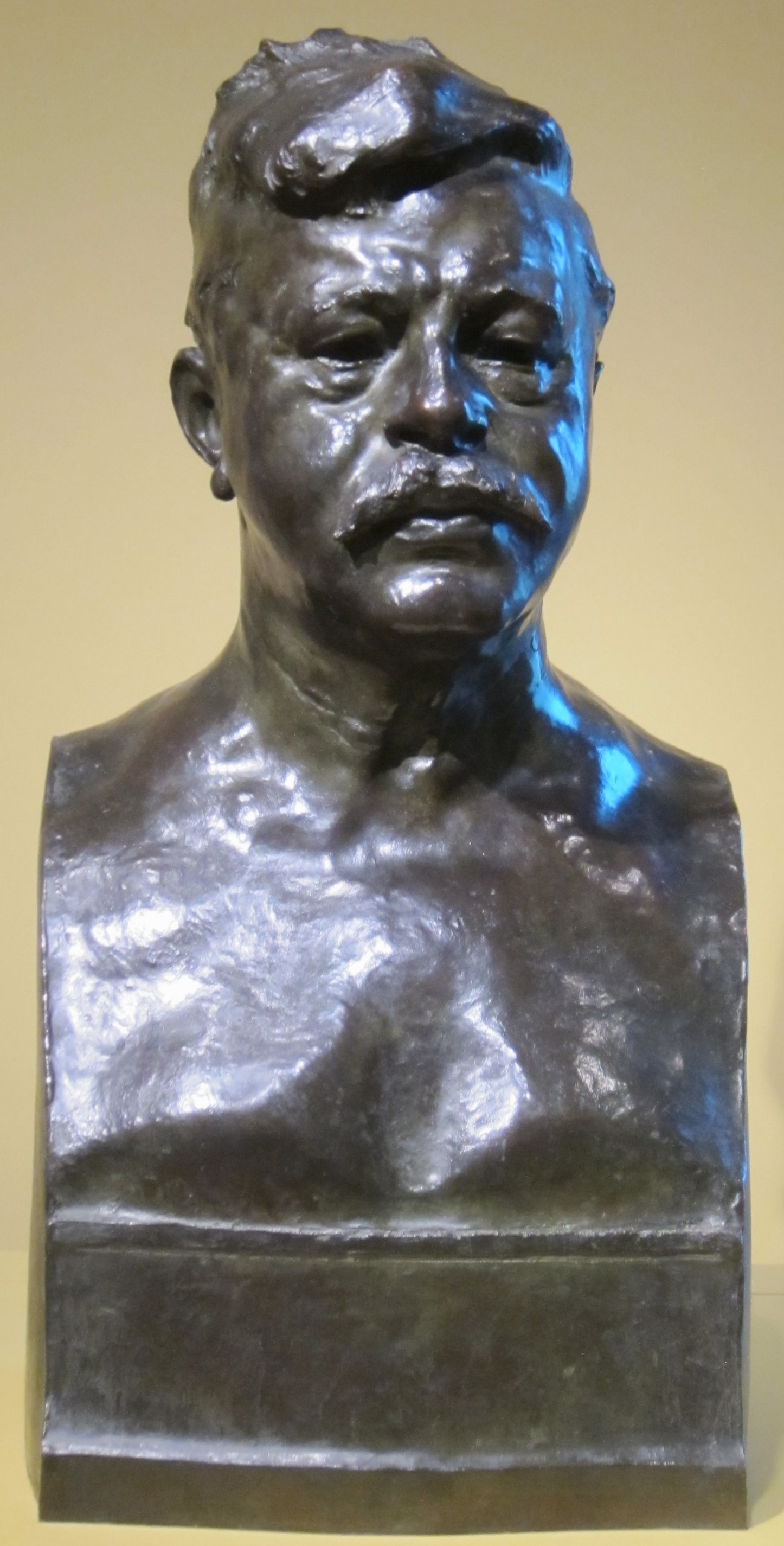
Frank Duveneck (1915), Cincinnati Art Museum

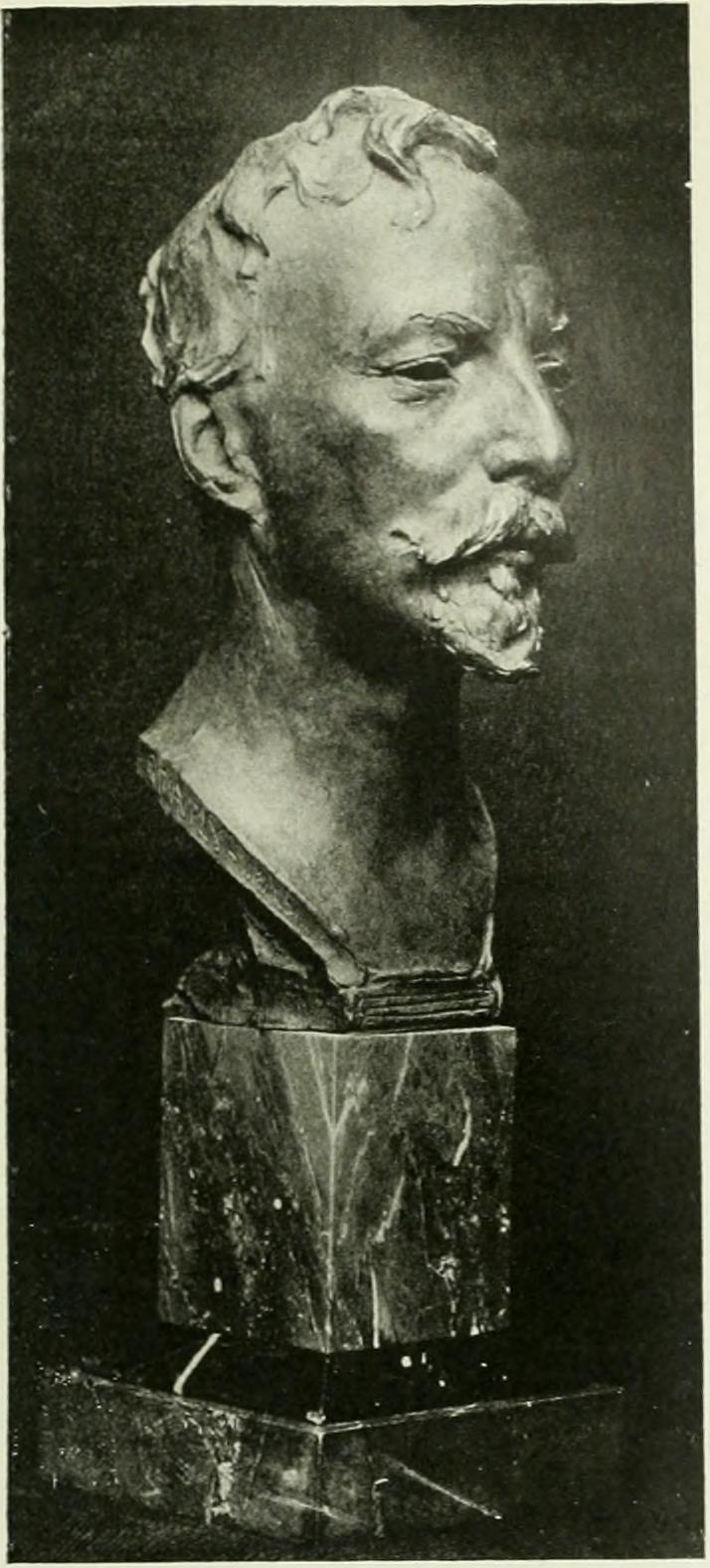
Paul Wayland Bartlett (1916), National Academy of Design
