= Gest (surname) =

Gest is a surname. Notable people with the surname include:

- Alain Gest (born 1950), French politician
- David Gest (1953–2016), American television producer
- John B. Gest (1823–1907), American banker and lawyer
- Joseph Henry Gest (1859–1935), American artist and museum director
- Lillian Gest (1897–1986), American mountain climber, writer
- Morris Gest (1875–1942), Jewish-American theatrical producer
- William H. Gest (1838-1912), member of the United States House of Representatives from Illinois
