= Gest =

Gest or GEST may refer to:

- A type of story or adventure
- Gest (surname)
- GEST Songs of Newfoundland and Labrador (see music of Newfoundland and Labrador)
- Gothenburg English Studio Theatre, a professional English-language theatre company in Sweden
