= Joseph Henry Gest =

American artist and museum director (1859–1935)

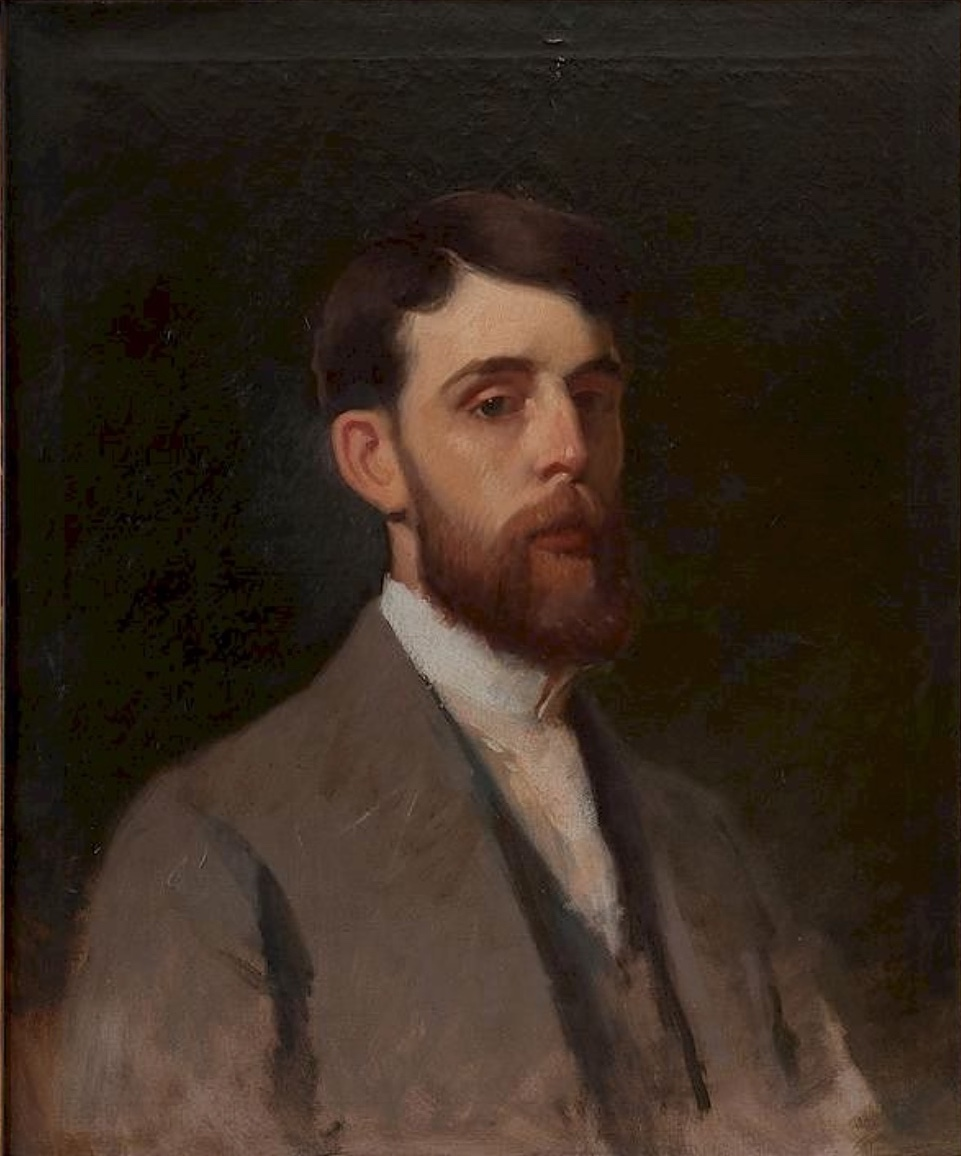
- Portrait of Gest by Frank Duveneck
- Born: 24 April 1859; Cincinnati, Ohio, US
- Died: 26 June 1935 (age 76); Cincinnati, Ohio, US
- Occupations: Artist, art administrator

Joseph Henry Gest (24 April 1859 – 26 June 1935) was an American artist and art administrator who served as the director of the Cincinnati Art Museum (1902–1929) and president of the Rookwood Pottery Company (1914–1934).

As the museum's second director, Gest in his nearly 30-year tenure oversaw a massive expansion of the museum's gallery space, the hiring of its first professional art librarian, and the beginning of its print department. He worked closely with the collector Mary Emery to greatly expand the museum's holdings of European paintings, and forged partnerships with local schools and businesses.

At Rookwood, Gest adopted a more hands-off approach, opting to continue the policies of his predecessor William Watts Taylor. While successful at first, this led to problems when Rookwood encountered financial difficulties and Gest proved unable to adapt. Some historians of Rookwood have criticized Gest's handling of the company.

An artist of some ability in his own right, Gest was too preoccupied by his responsibilities elsewhere to devote much time to his art until retirement, when he painted a large number of landscapes, mostly in pastel.

== Youth and personal life ==
Gest was born in Cincinnati on 24 April 1859 to Joseph John and Susannah Bailey Gest. His father was the owner of the Miami Soap and Oil Works, a large manufacturing firm that produced candles, soap, machine oil, tallow, and other related products. Gest was the second of six children; among his siblings was younger brother Guion Moore Gest (1864-1948), a prominent book collector and sinophile who went on to found the Gest Oriental Library at Princeton University.

Gest was educated by private tutors and as a teen studied art in Hannover (1872-1875) before attending Harvard University (1876-1880), where he continued his studies under Charles Eliot Norton. Upon his graduation from Harvard, he spent a time working for his father's firm, but after their factory suffered two devastating fires on 20 June 1881 and 27 February 1882, the business was abandoned. Afterward he for several years administered a dairy farm near Newport, Kentucky owned by his uncle Erasmus Gest (1820-1908), overseeing the breeding and raising of Jersey cattle.

Gest's character was described as quiet, unassuming, and "almost shy". He married Eliza "Lillie" Schultze (1857-1925) on 15 June 1887; they had four children together.

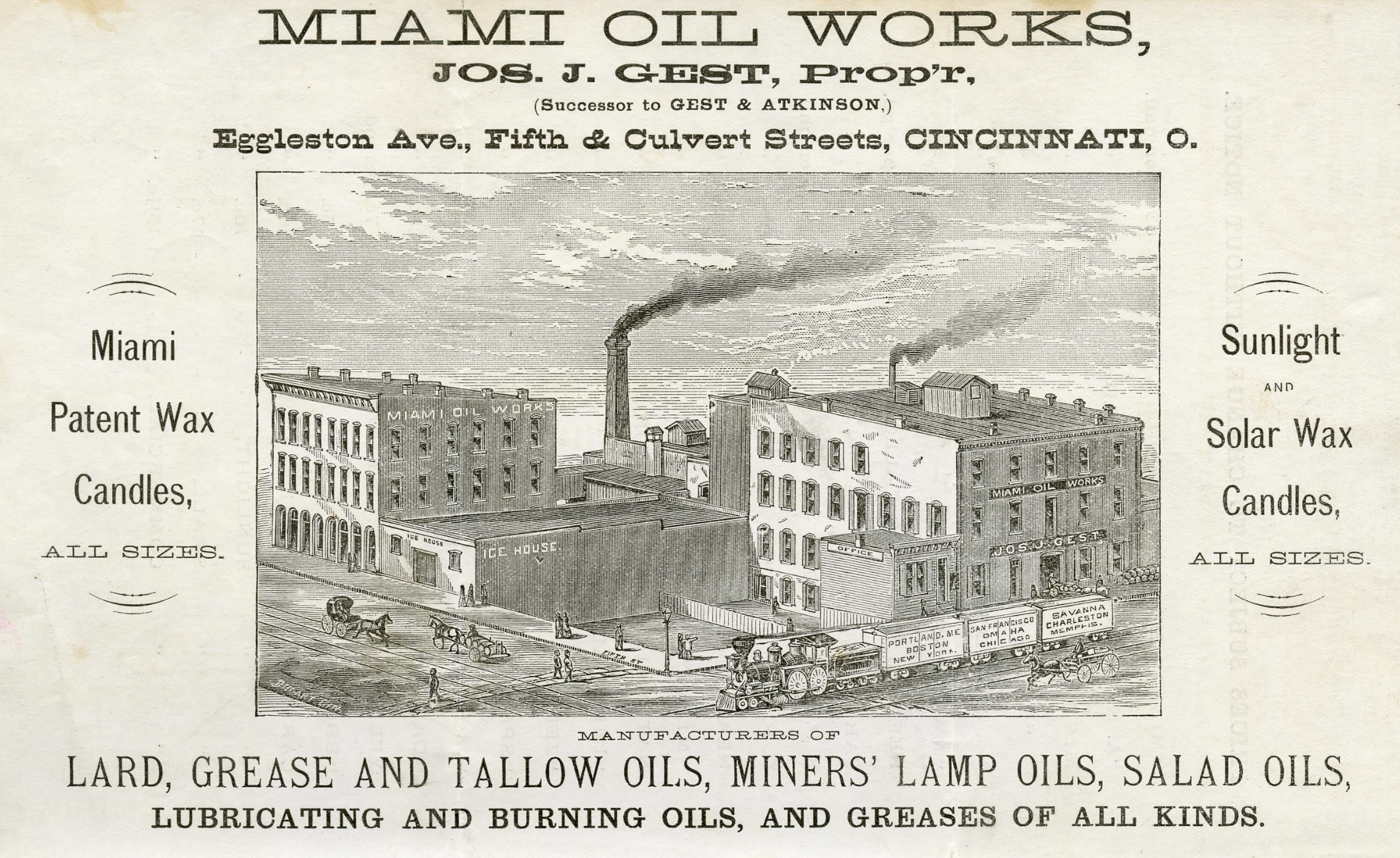
The Miami Oil Works factory in downtown Cincinnati, owned by Gest's father Joseph John Gest

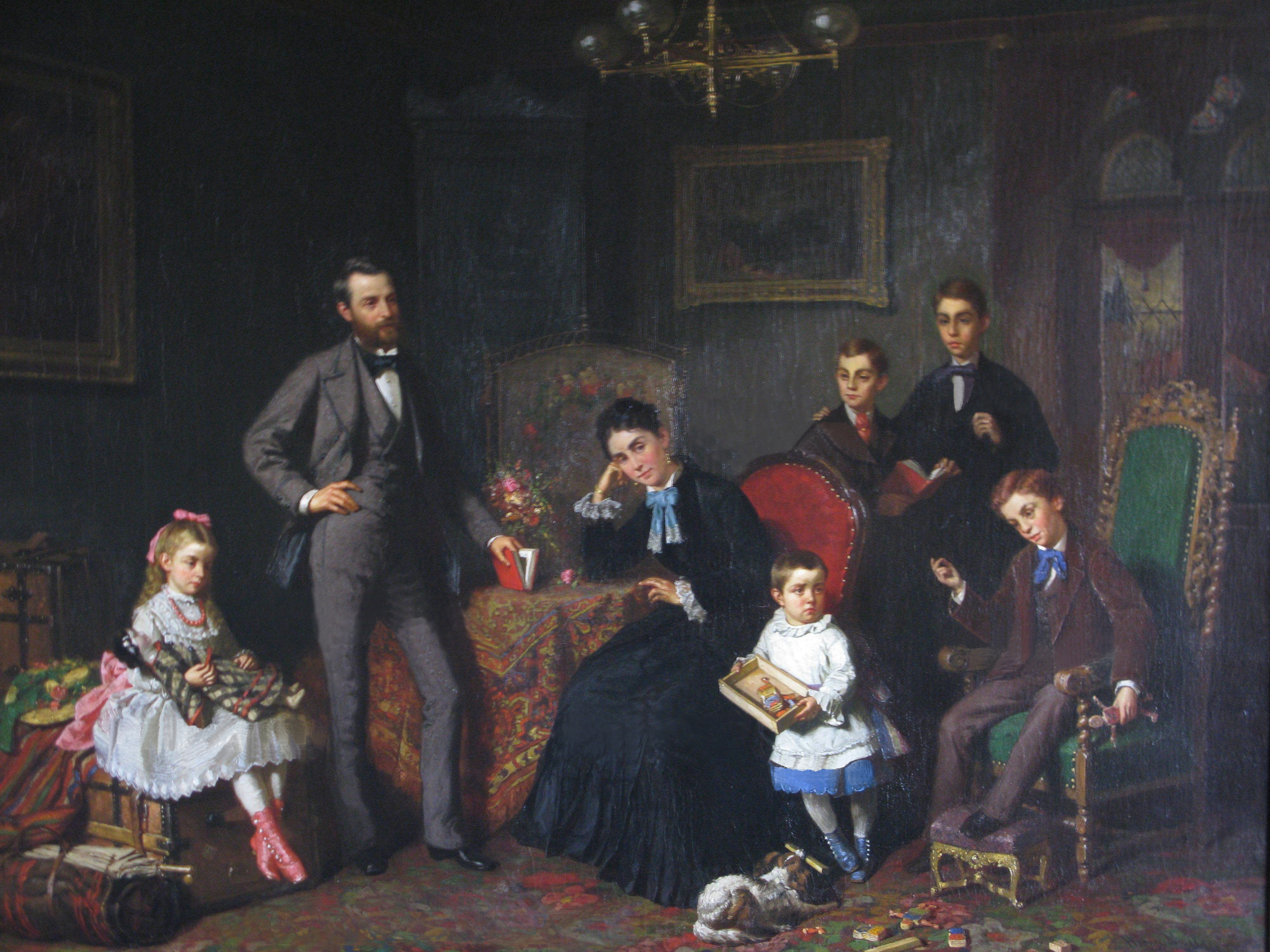
Henry Mosler (1876) The Gest Family - Joseph Henry Gest is second from right

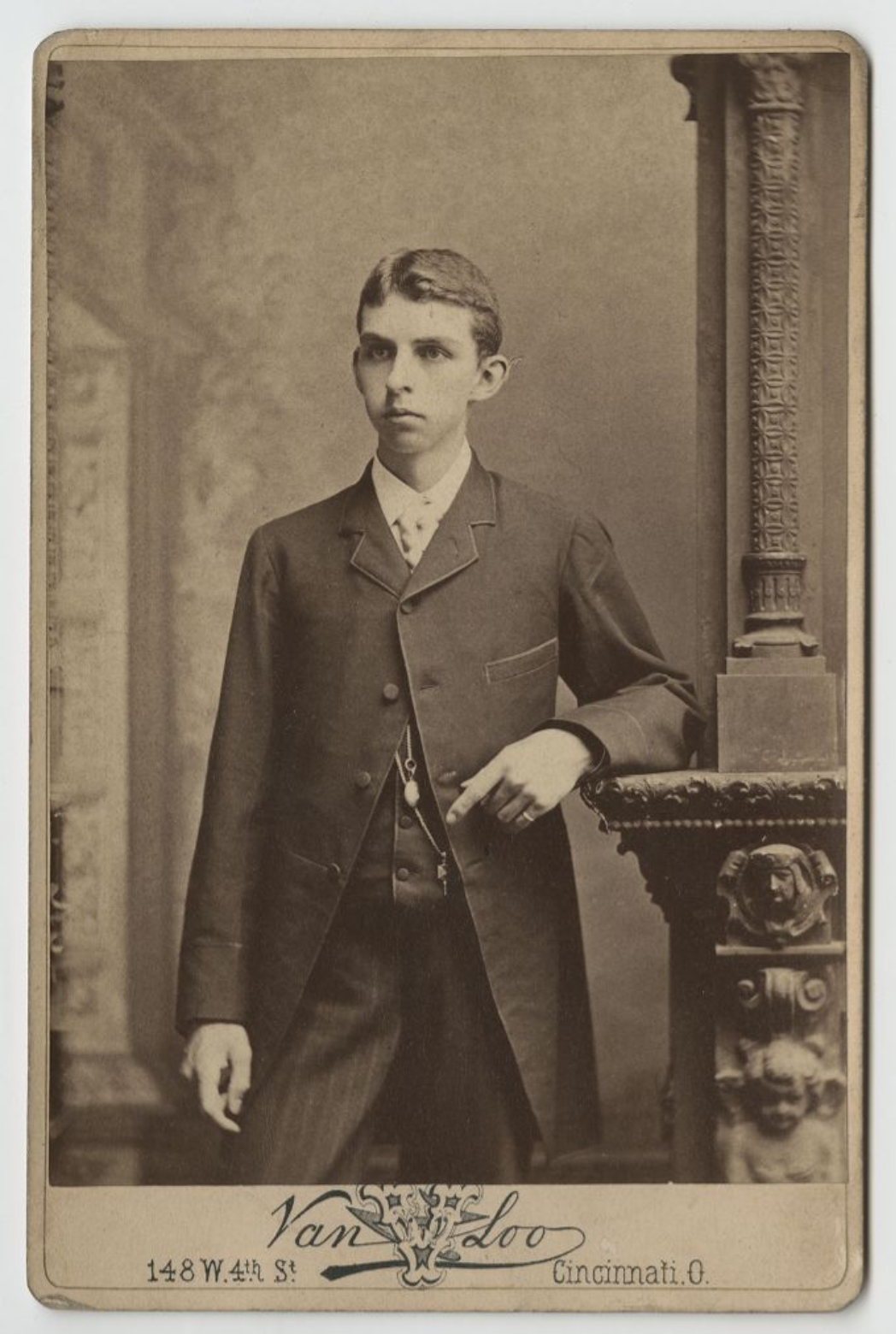
Gest as photographed by Leon Van Loo in 1880-1881, shortly after his graduation from Harvard

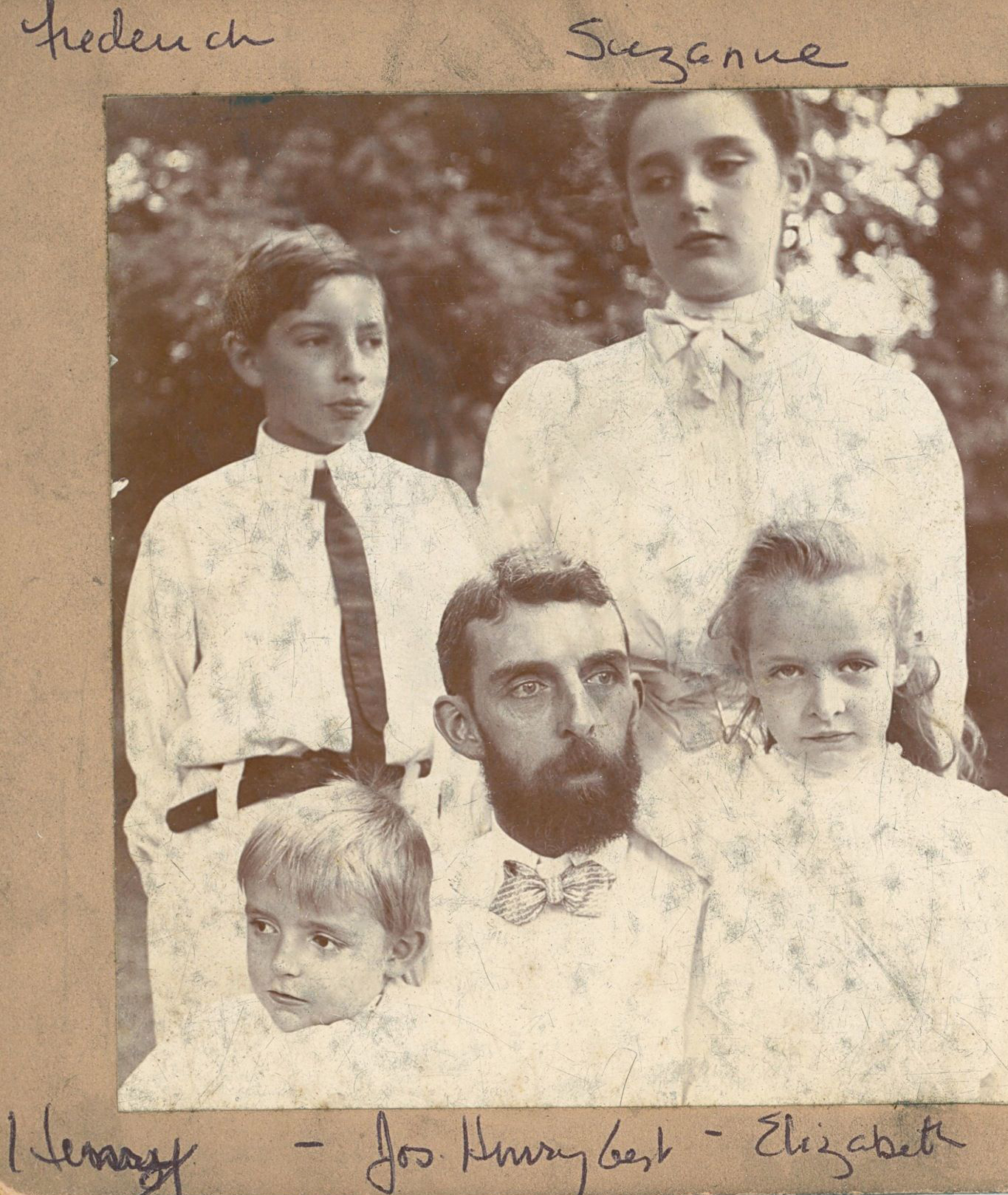
Gest and his four children, sometime before 1914

== The Cincinnati Art Museum ==
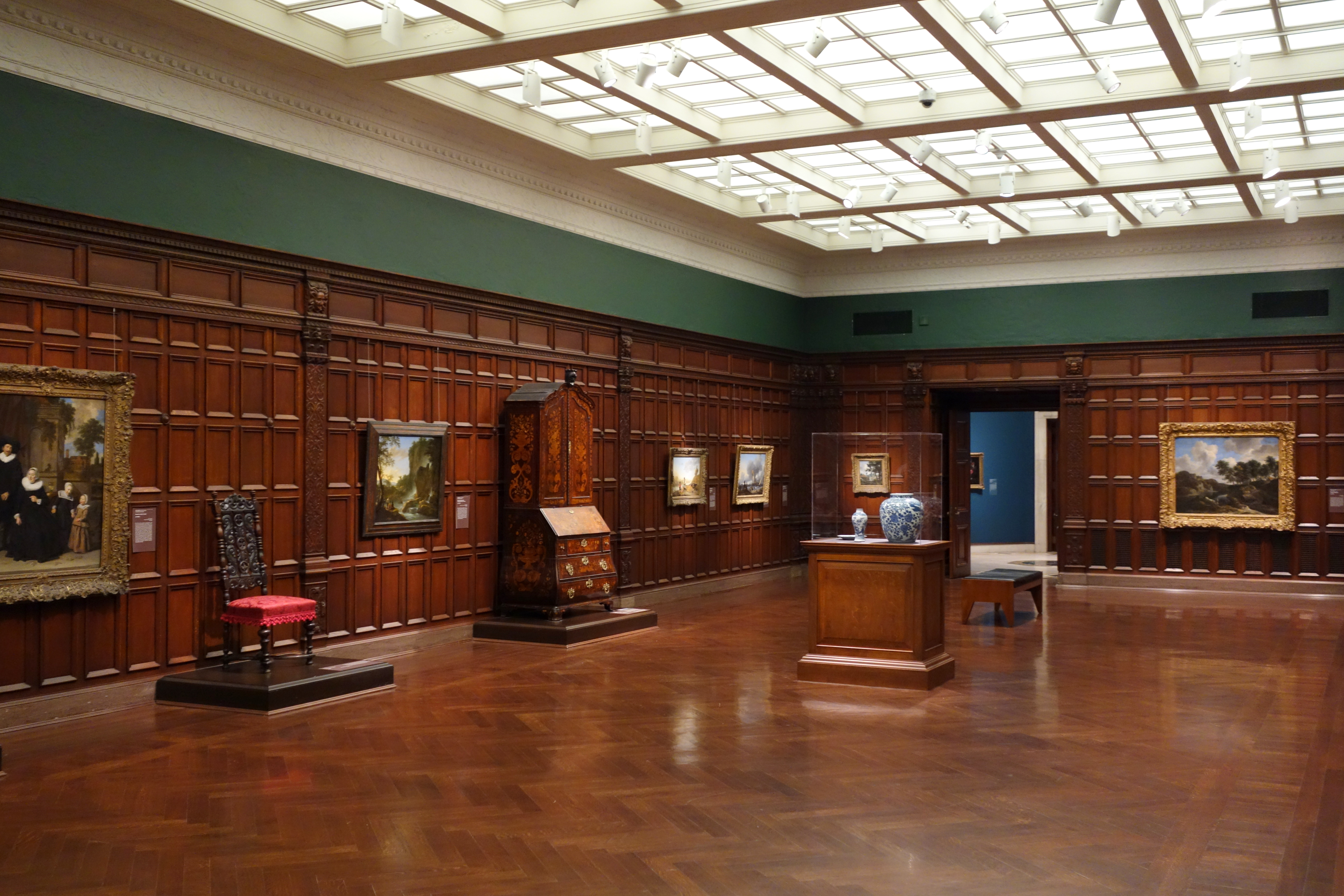
A gallery in the Emery Wing, built during Gest's tenure to house Mary Emery's collection.

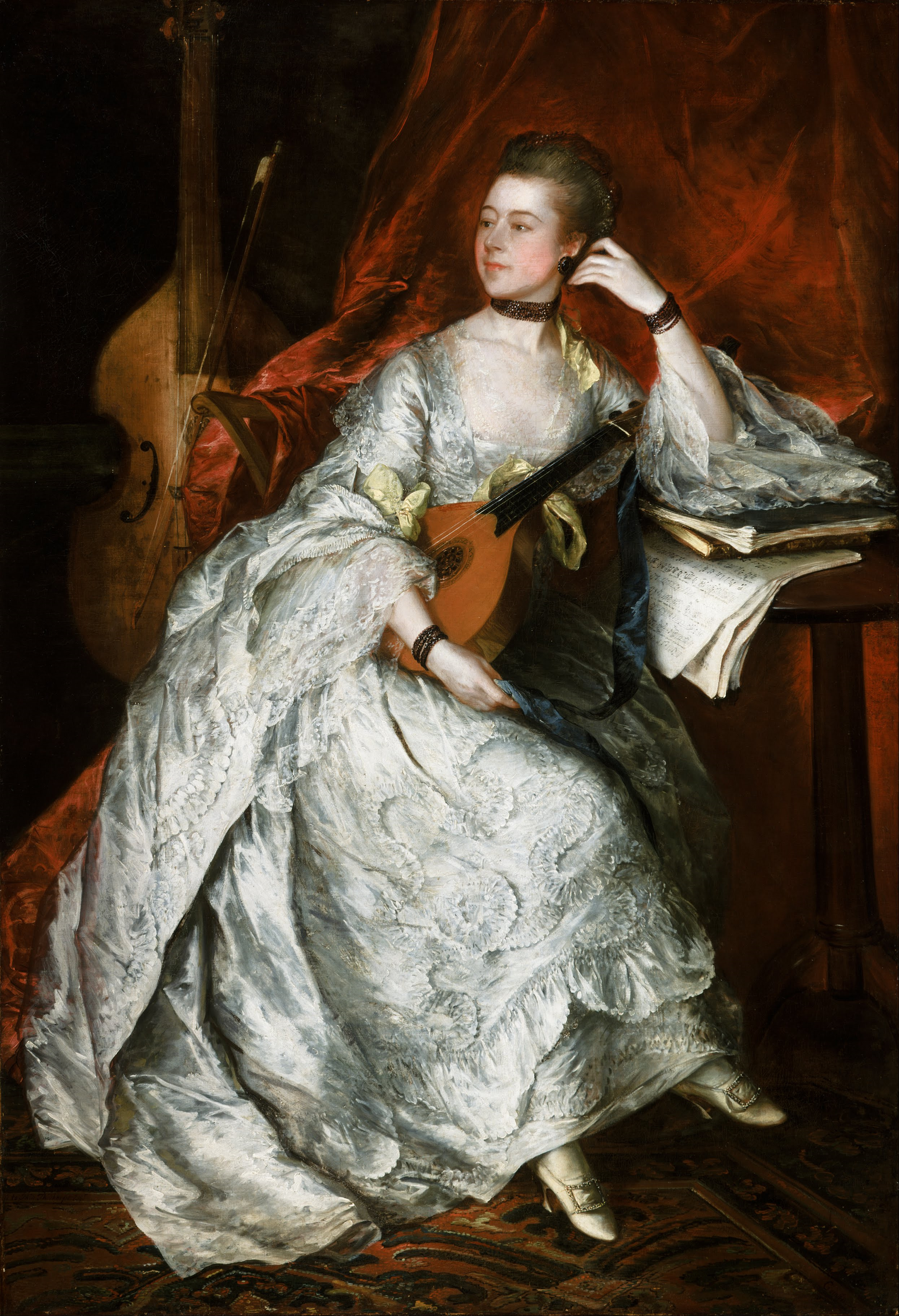
Thomas Gainsborough's 1760 portrait Anne Ford, later Mrs. Philip Thicknesse was a major acquisition during Gest's tenure.

Gest joined the staff of the Cincinnati Museum Association in September 1886, serving as a clerk for the newly opened Cincinnati Art Museum. By 1888 he was assistant director of the museum. During his tenure as assistant director he was put in charge of the Art Academy of Cincinnati, which at the time was still part of the Museum. He spent this time developing good relationships with local artists. Art Academy instructor Frank Duveneck in particular became a close personal friend, and would spend Christmases with the Gest family. When Duveneck left the Art Academy following a dispute between Academy chairman Thomas Satterwhite Noble and Maria Longworth Storer, Gest was able to persuade him to return around 1900.

In 1902 Gest became the second director of the Cincinnati Art Museum, succeeding Alfred T. Goshorn. Due to Goshorn's poor health, Gest had been serving as director in all but name for some time by then. At first other candidates were considered to replace Goshorn, but Duveneck threatened to leave again and take his students with him if Gest wasn't made director. "Well, boys," he was heard to remark, "We might as well pack up our traps and get ready to move. It won't be so good here without Mr. Gest."

As director, Gest constantly pressed the board for expanded exhibition space to house the museum's growing collection. The first major project of Gest's tenure was thus the completion of the Schmidlapp Wing, proposed and paid for by the wealthy distiller Jacob G. Schmidlapp in 1900. Architect Daniel Burnham's neoclassical design with its imposing doric facade was accepted in 1903 and completed in 1907. Schmidlapp's proposal had stipulated that the wing contain a library, so Gest oversaw the existing library's expansion and the hiring of the museum's first professional library staff.

Still Gest pressed for more space, and when John J. Emery bequeathed his painting collection to the museum in 1908, the idea came to use the bequests of Eliza and Mary Ropes to house it. The Ropes Wing, designed by architects Garber & Woodward, was completed in 1910. During its construction, the museum was also wired for electricity.

Meanwhile, John J. Emery's brother Thomas J. Emery died, and his widow Mary Emery decided to use the fortune she had inherited for philanthropy and art collecting. With the understanding that her collection would be bequeathed to the art museum, Emery regularly consulted with Gest on potential purchases, in what would prove to be an extremely fruitful partnership. Over the years the paintings purchased in this way included Frans Hals's Portrait of a Dutch Family and Andrea Mantegna's Sibyl and Prophet.

In 1925 Emery endowed a new wing to house her collection, and another local collector Mary Hanna soon announced her plans to do the same. Construction began on these wings in 1927, again by Garber & Woodward, but would not be complete until January 1930, immediately after Gest's retirement.

In 1928 Gest established the museum's print department, inviting the collector Herbert Greer French to serve as its curator. In 1929 French donated $100,000 to build the French wing, which would contain print galleries and a print study room. The French wing filled the gap between the Hanna wing, the Emery Wing, and the Art Academy building, creating an enclosed courtyard at the center of the museum.

Throughout his tenure Gest believed strongly in the value of applied arts, devoting large portions of the museum's gallery space to textiles, ceramics, and metalwork. When Mary Emery announced her gift of a wing to the museum, Gest was "ecstatic," not only because of the second floor space to house her collection, but because the entire first floor would be used to expand the collection space for applied and industrial arts. As he wrote in a museum publication;

The museum gives fully half its space to applied arts, accumulating collections of art objects helpful to the metal worker, to the potter, to the weaver of textiles, the carver of ornaments and in general the designer and decorator. It recognizes the cultural value of the work of the artisan. It urges upon him the dignity of his profession even alongside the paintings and sculptures which to many are the beginning and end of art. It preaches in all its galleries the unity of art, that each manifestation of beauty is but a different expression of the same truth. — Joseph Henry Gest, Industrial Art

Gest also built connections between the community and the museum, lecturing frequently on art topics and establishing a partnership with public schools that allowed high schoolers to receive art history and studio art lessons at the museum for free.

Gest retired at the end of August 1929. The museum closed in September to install exhibitions for the three new wings, reopening in January 1930 under new director Walter Siple.

== Rookwood Pottery Company ==
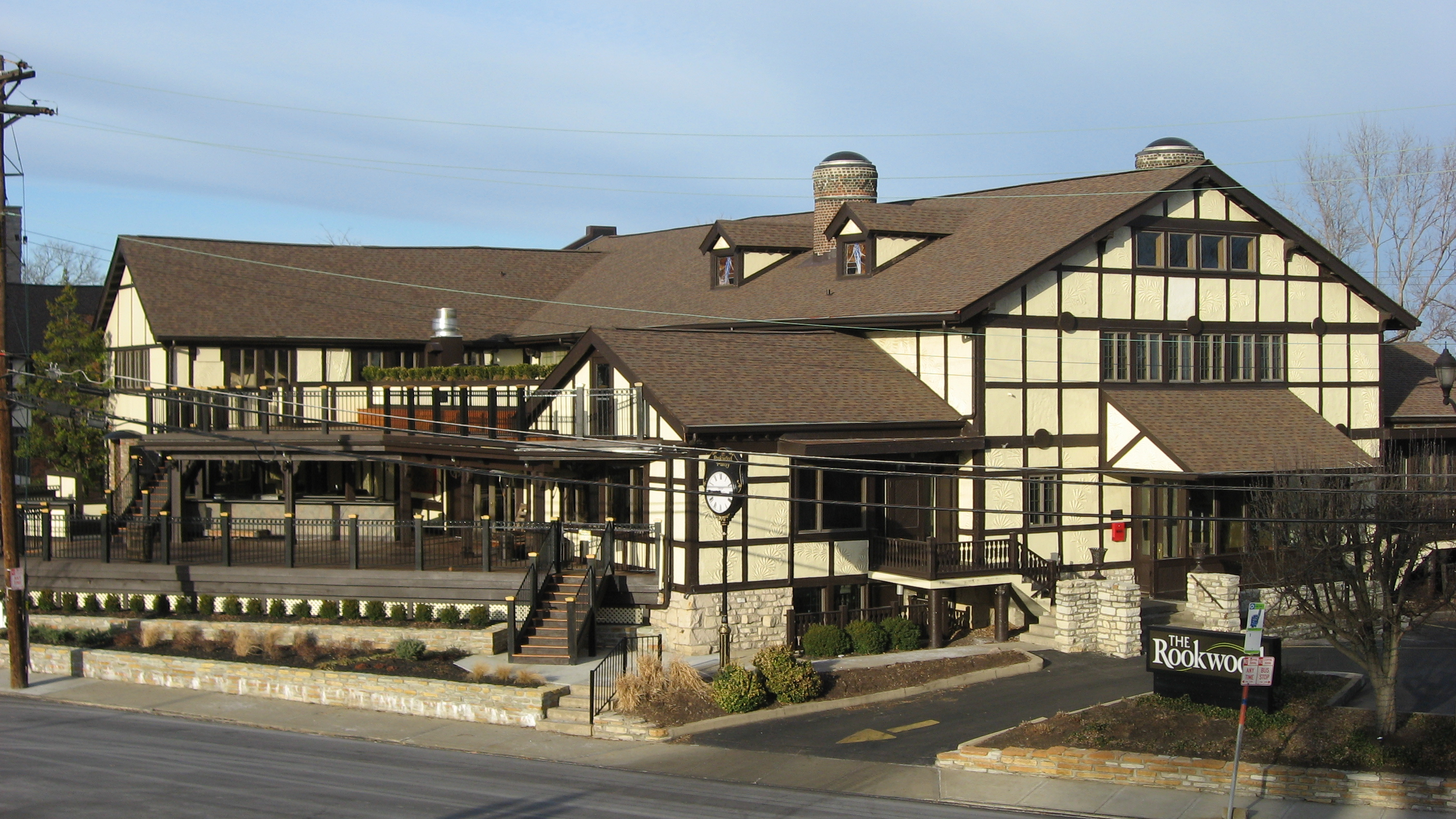
The Rookwood Pottery Company's former building in Mount Adams

In 1902, soon after Gest was appointed director of the Cincinnati Art Museum, he was approached by William Watts Taylor, the president of the Rookwood Pottery Company, with a request for help administering the company. Taylor was preoccupied with growing the architectural faience division of the company, and needed a vice president to fill the space left open by the departure of Bellamy Storer. Gest accepted the position and was elected vice-president on March 15 of that year.

Taylor died in November 1913, and Gest succeeded him as president in January 1914. Unlike Taylor, Gest proved not to be a hands-on leader, instead focusing on broad policy matters while delegating the day-to-day operations to vice president John D. Wareham and chief chemist Stanley Burt. Gest began splitting his time between the museum and the pottery, spending 8:30 a.m. to noon at the museum and afternoons at Rookwood, an arrangement that would continue for the next 15 years. Gest maintained most of Taylor's policies, and the pottery did well during the first decade of his presidency.

However, in April 1925 the pottery ran into trouble with the IRS, which claimed they had been undervaluing their inventory and owed $25,000 in taxes. Gest travelled to Washington, D.C. several times to argue the company's case, but was unsuccessful and the matter went to court. Critically, no preparations were put in place should the case be decided against Rookwood. Meanwhile, the pottery's record profits of the early '20s turned to loss, and business in the architectural division steadily declined due to rising competition.

In 1928 Rookwood lost their case against the IRS, and while they eventually won an appeal, the entire process of fighting the decision was extremely costly. When the Great Depression hit the following year the company was already short on liquid assets. By 1930 Rookwood was taking bank loans to remain in the black; Gest, who "was not at home in finance", announced to the board that the deficits were "taken care of." The losses continued in 1931, and Gest proposed issuing 1200 new shares, which the shareholders accepted - only 140 of these were sold, however. By October 1931 Gest was unable to find a bank willing to loan Rookwood money, and the pottery was temporarily shut down. The next year the losses still continued; by the end of 1932 most of the decorators had been laid off and the decorating room remained shut down except for special orders.

At the start of 1933 Gest cut his salary from $6,000 to $4,000, of which only $1,560 was paid. Losses continued into 1934 however, and in July 1934 Gest resigned. John D. Wareham succeeded him as president, and Gest remained a director and the chairman of the board, though these were mostly honorary titles. Historians of Rookwood have criticized Gest's handling of the company: Herbert Peck wrote that Gest "neither liked nor fully understood" the financial side of Rookwood, and Nancy Owen wrote that Gest's inability to adapt Rookwood's policies to a changing market "contributed to the eventual downfall of the Pottery".

== Retirement and artistic pursuits ==
Gest found time for his own artistic pursuits in his retirement from the art museum, painting impressionistic landscapes and local scenes in oil, watercolor, and especially pastel. In 1932 his work was shown at the Macbeth Gallery in New York alongside work by John Henry Twachtman and J. Alden Weir, where it was favorably reviewed by art critic Royal Cortissoz: "[Gest] has the true feeling for landscape sentiment and the right delicate touch for his medium. He gives us faint, opalescent impressions, insubstantial and charming."

Gest died on 26 June 1935 and was buried in a family plot in Spring Grove Cemetery.

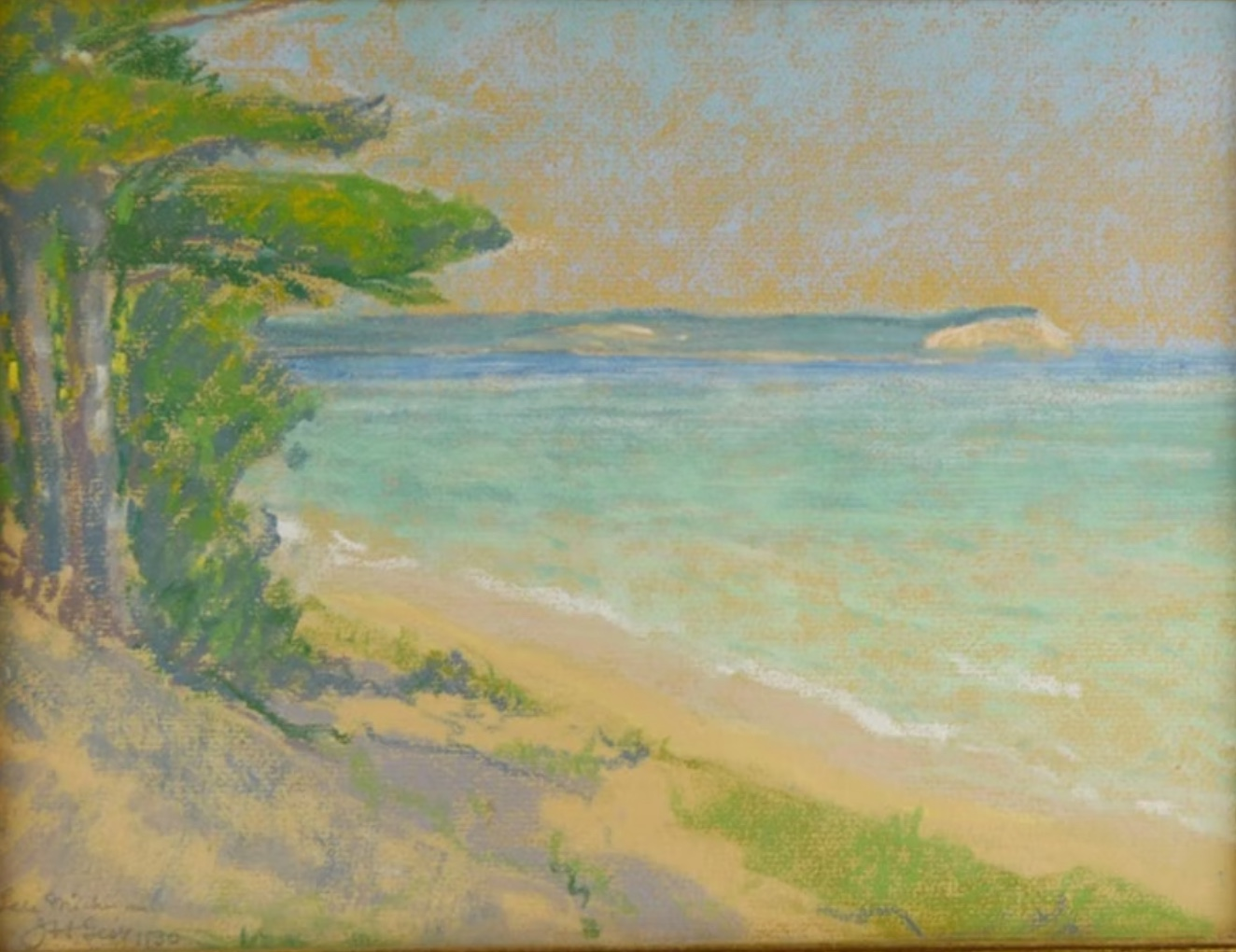
Lake Michigan, 1930, pastel on board. Private collection.

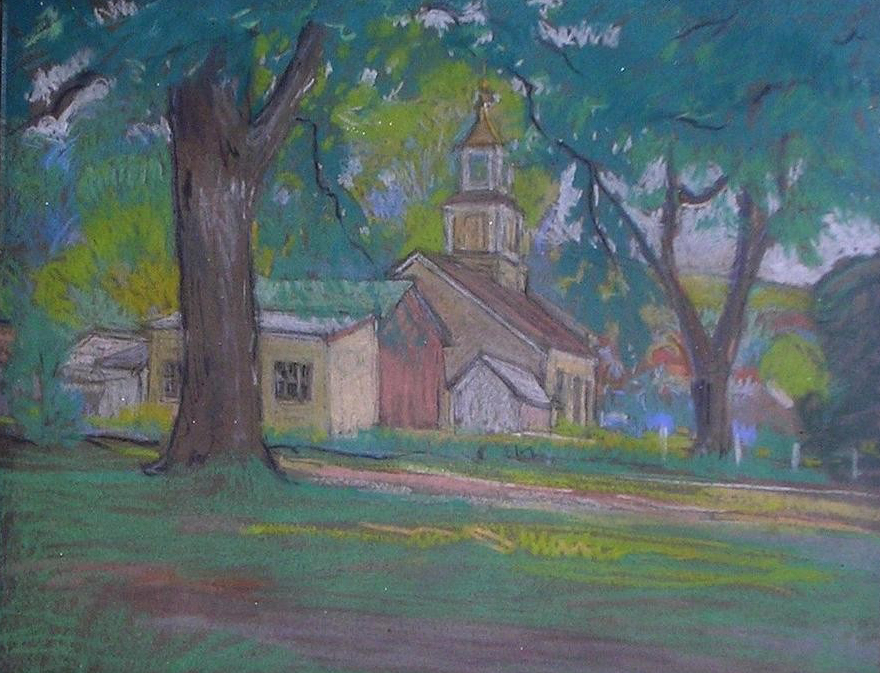
Petersburg, Kentucky, c. 1934, pastel. Private collection.

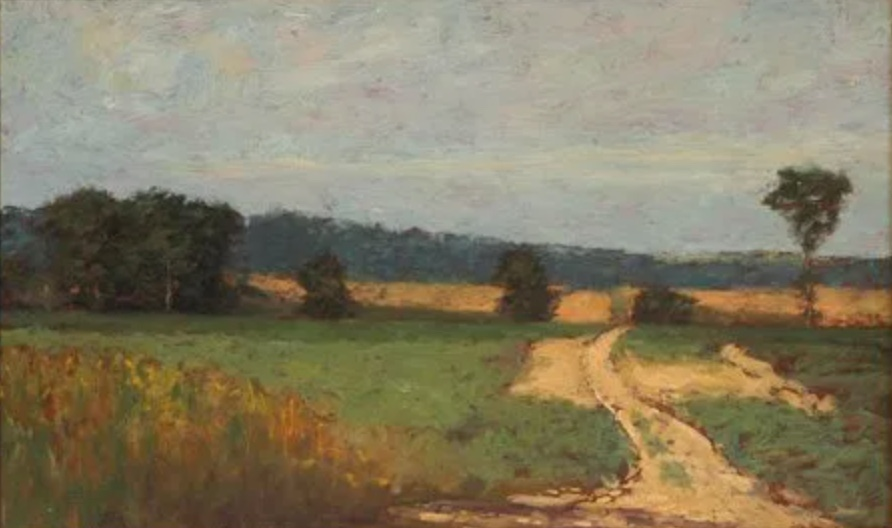
Untitled landscape, early 1930s, oil on panel. Private collection.

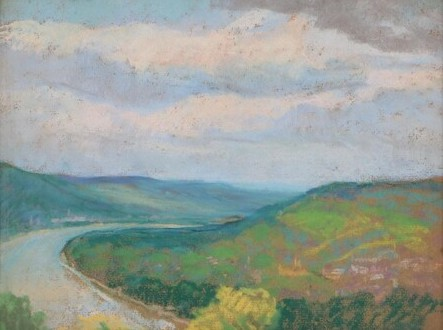
Untitled landscape, early 1930s, pastel on board. Private collection.
