= Portrait of a Dutch Family =

Painting by Frans Hals

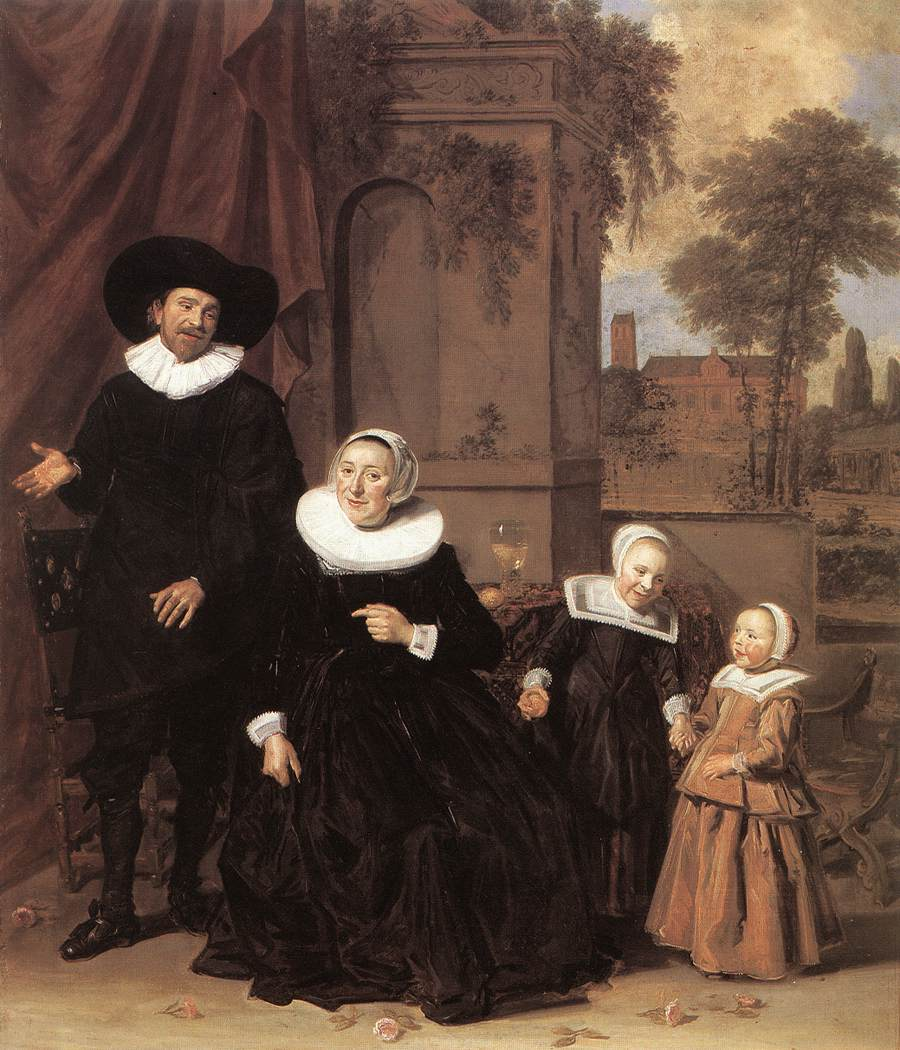
- Portrait of a Dutch Family
- Artist: Frans Hals
- Year: c. 1635
- Catalogue: Seymour Slive, Catalog 1974: #102
- Medium: Oil on canvas
- Dimensions: 113 cm × 93.4 cm (44 in × 36.8 in)
- Location: Cincinnati Art Museum; Cincinnati
- Accession: 1927.399

Portrait of a Dutch Family is an oil-on-canvas painting by the Dutch Golden Age painter Frans Hals, painted c. 1635 and now in the Cincinnati Art Museum, Cincinnati.

== Painting ==
The painting is one of a handful of paintings that Hals made of families in the "picnic style" of open air settings, but this one seems to be executed entirely in the studio, complete with a Hals signature curtain. The family has been identified by the Dutch art historian Frans Grijzenhout in 2022. The backdrop seems artificially staged and is probably by another hand. The name of Pieter de Molijn has been suggested by diverse art historians.

== Name ==
In his 1910 catalog of Frans Hals works Hofstede de Groot wrote:

440. A FAMILY GROUP OF FOUR PERSONS. B. 35; M. 87. On a terrace, to the left, stands a man facing the spectator. He wears a broad-brimmed black hat and a black costume with a close-fitting ruff, His right foot is advanced. He turns his head three-quarters right, and makes a gesture with his right hand as if he is speaking. His wife, seated to the right, listens with a smile. Her right arm hangs down; her left hand is at her breast. She wears a black dress, a white cap, a white ruff, and thin white wristbands. To the right of her two laughing girls hold each other's hands. The elder one, to the left, holds an orange in her right hand. She is in black; the younger girl, to the right, is in brown or yellowish-grey. Both wear lace-trimmed caps and collars. Behind the figures is a table on which are a wine-glass and a lemon. In the background is a building overgrown with foliage; a drapery hangs down on the left; to the right is a view of a garden with a house. Roses are strewn in the foreground. Canvas, 44 inches by 36 inches.

Exhibited in Paris, 1883, in an exhibition of masterpieces.

Sales: — J. van Leeuwaarden, widow of P. Merkman, Haarlem, September 21, 1773, No. 4.

  - (Probably) O. W. J. Berg van Dussen Muilkerk, Amsterdam, July 7, 1825, No. 44 (151 florins).
  - In the possession of the dealer Nieuwenhuys, 1862.

Sales: — Vicomte du Bus de Gisignies, Brussels, May 7, 1882, No. 33.

  - E. Secretan, Paris, July 1, 1889, No. 126.
  - In the collection of the late Rodolphe Kann, Paris.
  - In the possession of the London dealers Lawrie and Co.
  - In the possession of the Paris dealer C. Sedelmeyer, "Catalogue of 300 Paintings," 1898, No. 55.
  - In the collection of R. B. Angus, Montreal

This painting came into the collection of the Cincinnati Art Museum via the bequest of Mary M. Emery.

== See also ==
- List of paintings by Frans Hals
