= Quéant Mountain =

Mountain in British Columbia, Canada

- Location within British Columbia

Highest point
- Elevation: 3,120 m (10,240 ft)
- Prominence: 83 m (272 ft)
- Parent peak: Mount Spring-Rice (3276 m)
- Listing: Mountains of British Columbia
- Coordinates: 52°00′29″N 117°14′24″W

Geography
- Country: Canada
- Province: British Columbia
- Parent range: Park Ranges
- Topo map: NTS 83C3 Columbia Icefield

Climbing
- First ascent: 1937 Kate Gardiner, Lillian Gest, E. Feuz Jr., C. Hasler Jr.

Quéant Mountain is located directly SW of Mount Spring-Rice, just inside the provincial boundary of British Columbia. It was named in 1918 after Quéant, a village in France.

== See also ==
- Geography of British Columbia
