= Smith Memorial Arch =

Memorial arch in Pennsylvania, U.S.

Coordinates: 39°58′39″N 75°12′24″W

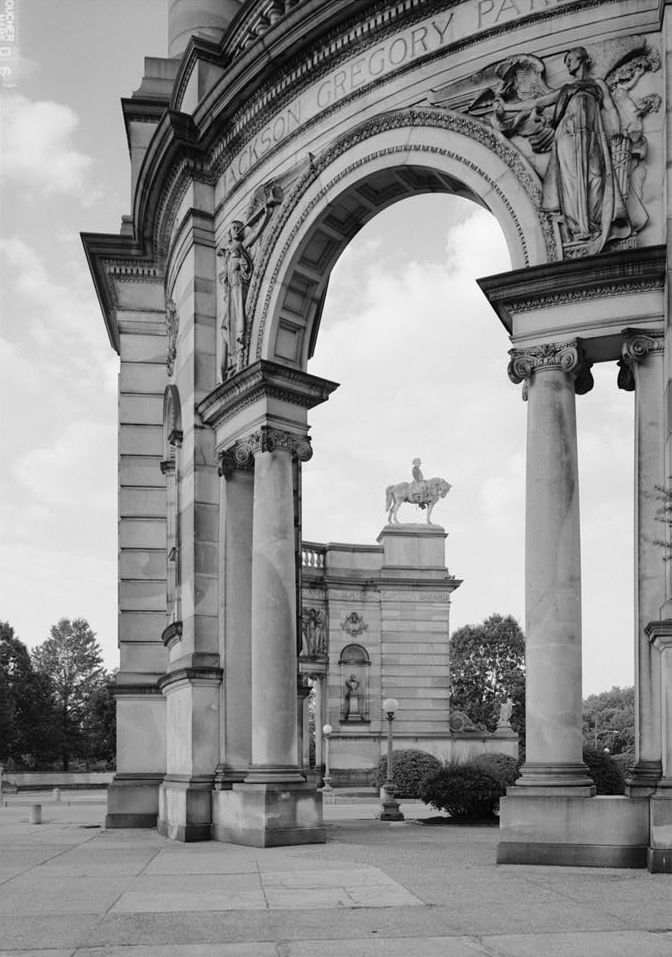
Smith Memorial Arch, West Fairmount Park, Philadelphia (1898-1912). Looking north, through south archway.

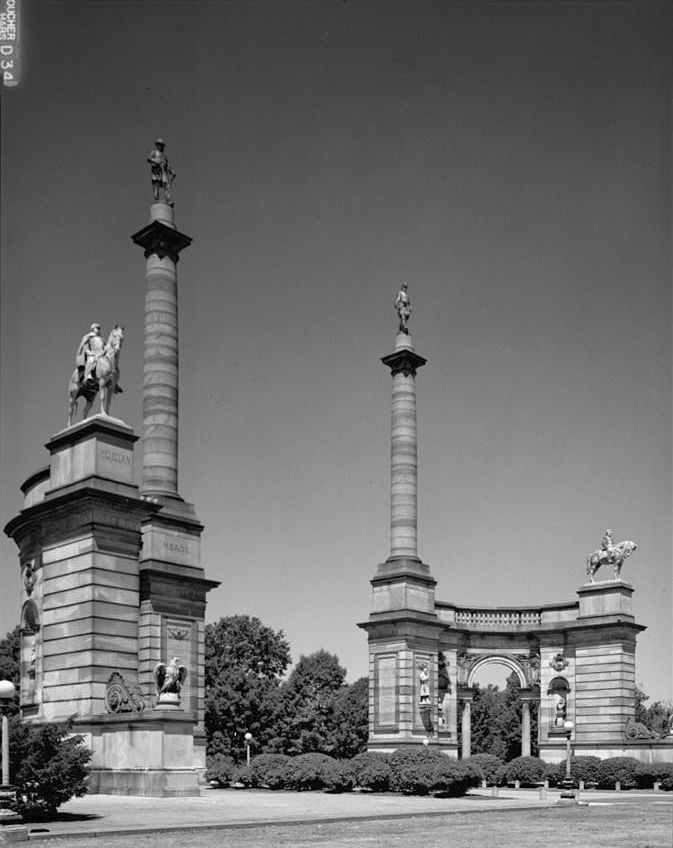
Overall view.

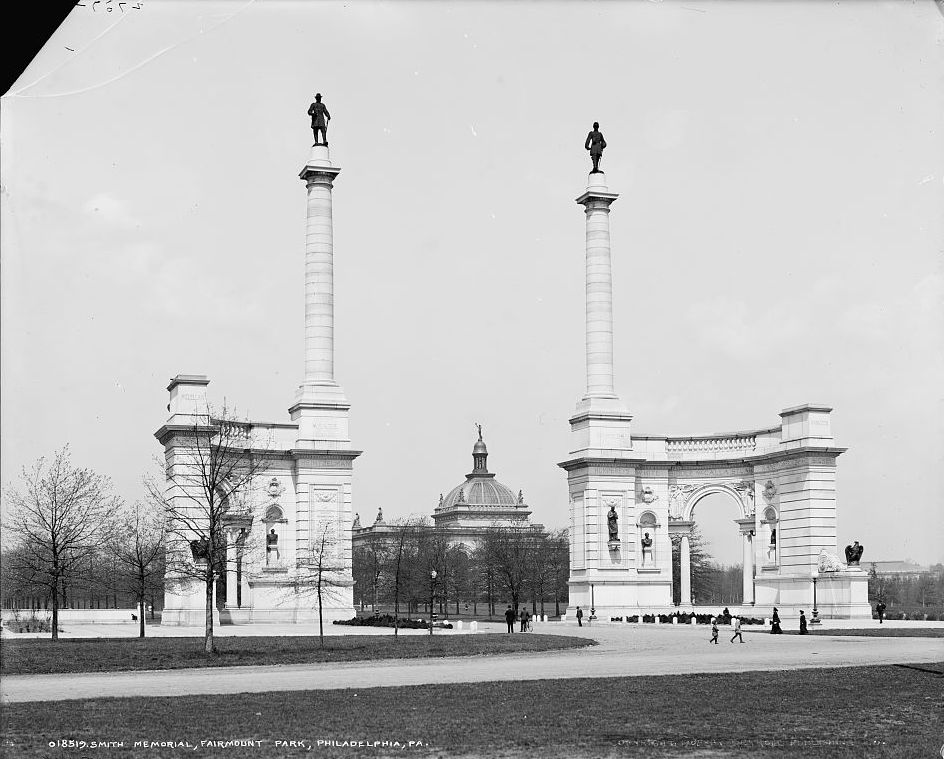
Unfinished Smith Memorial Arch (circa 1905), with Memorial Hall in the background.

Smith Memorial Arch is an American Civil War monument at South Concourse and Lansdowne Drive in Philadelphia, Pennsylvania. Built from 1897 to 1912 on the former grounds of the 1876 Centennial Exposition, it serves as a gateway to West Fairmount Park. The Memorial consists of two colossal columns supported by curving, neo-Baroque arches, and adorned with 13 individual portrait sculptures (two equestrians, three figures, and eight busts); two eagles standing on globes; and architectural reliefs of eight allegorical figures.

== History ==
In 1891, Richard Smith (1821-1894), a wealthy Philadelphia electrotyper and type founder, wrote a will that provided $500,000 ($17.9 million today) for a memorial arch to be adorned with portraits of Pennsylvania's Civil War military and naval heroes. Smith deposited the model and designs for the memorial with the Fidelity Insurance Trust and Safe Deposit Company and stipulated that: Fidelity president John B. Gest handle his request, that the architectural designs and construction be handled by Philadelphia architect James H. Windrim, and that the selection and supervision of sculptors for the specified portraits should be handled by the Fairmount Park Art Association (now the Association for Public Art).

These provisions of the will went into effect upon the death of Smith's wife in 1895. Two years later, the Fairmount Park Art Association began to select the sculptors. The initial commissions were awarded on May 8, 1898, and the final sculpture was installed in 1912.

The estate of Richard and Sarah Smith also funded the creation of Smith Memorial Playground & Playhouse, in East Fairmount Park.

== Sculpture ==
=== Statues ===
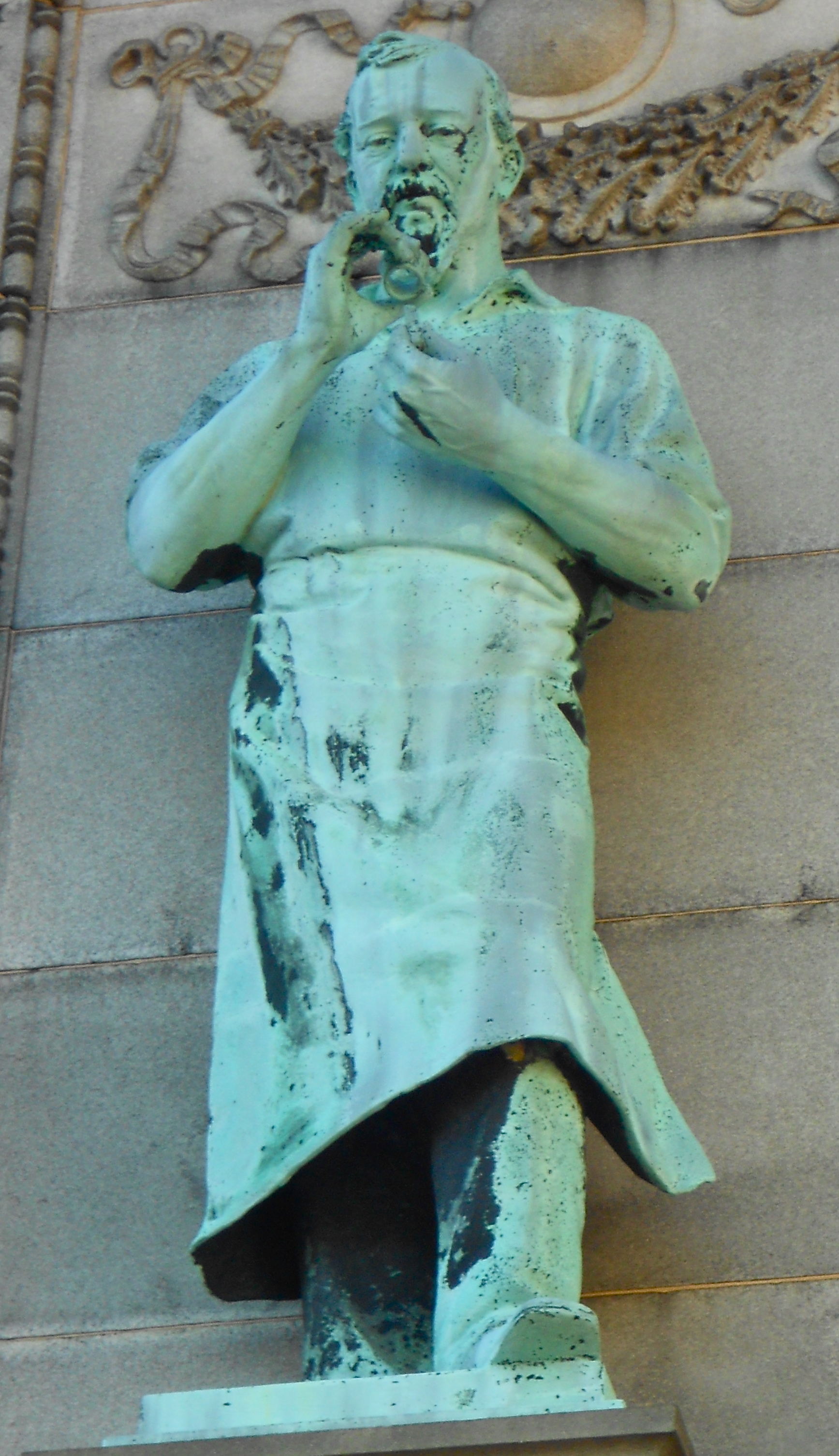
Statue of Richard Smith, donor of the memorial

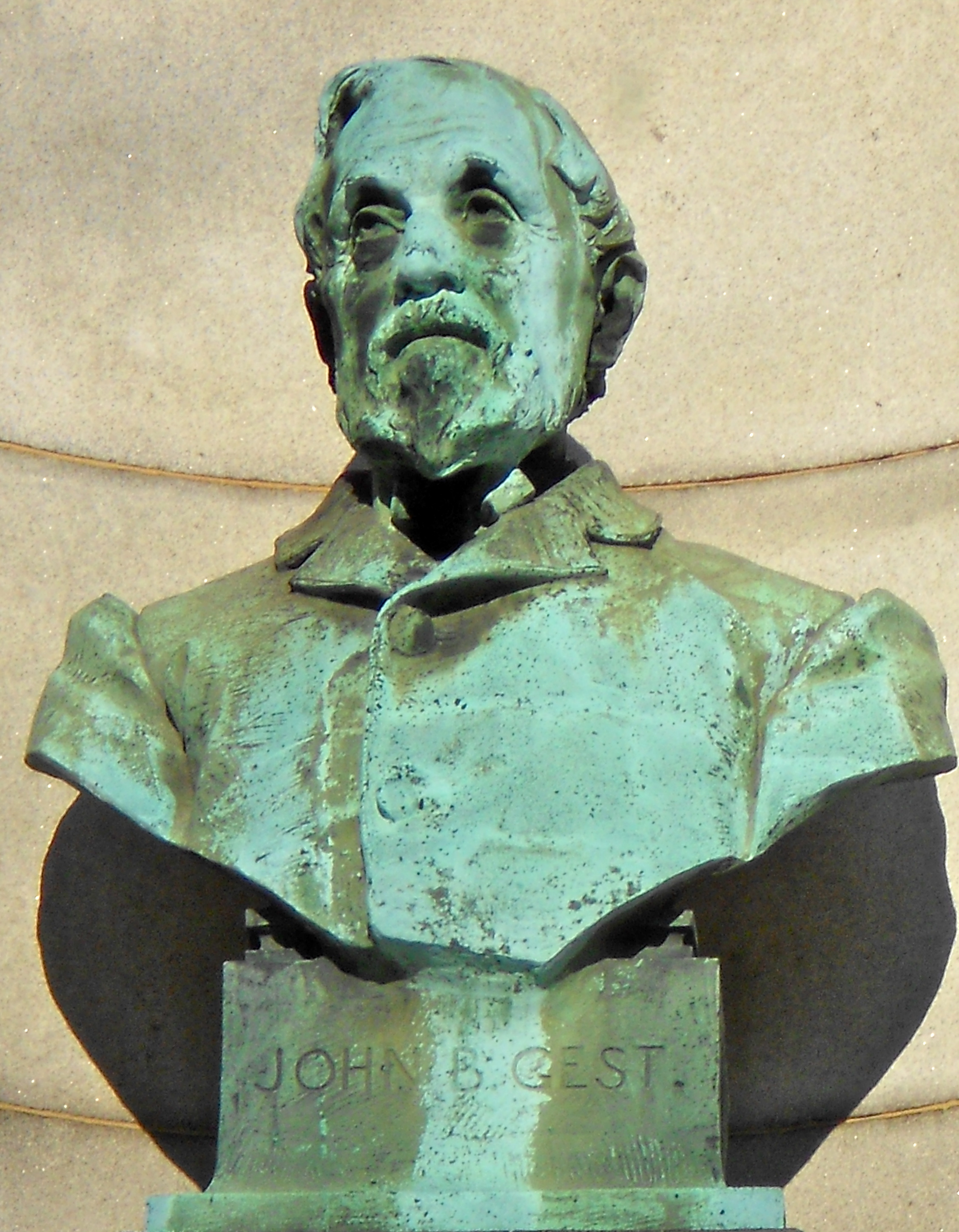
John B. Gest, executor of Smith's estate

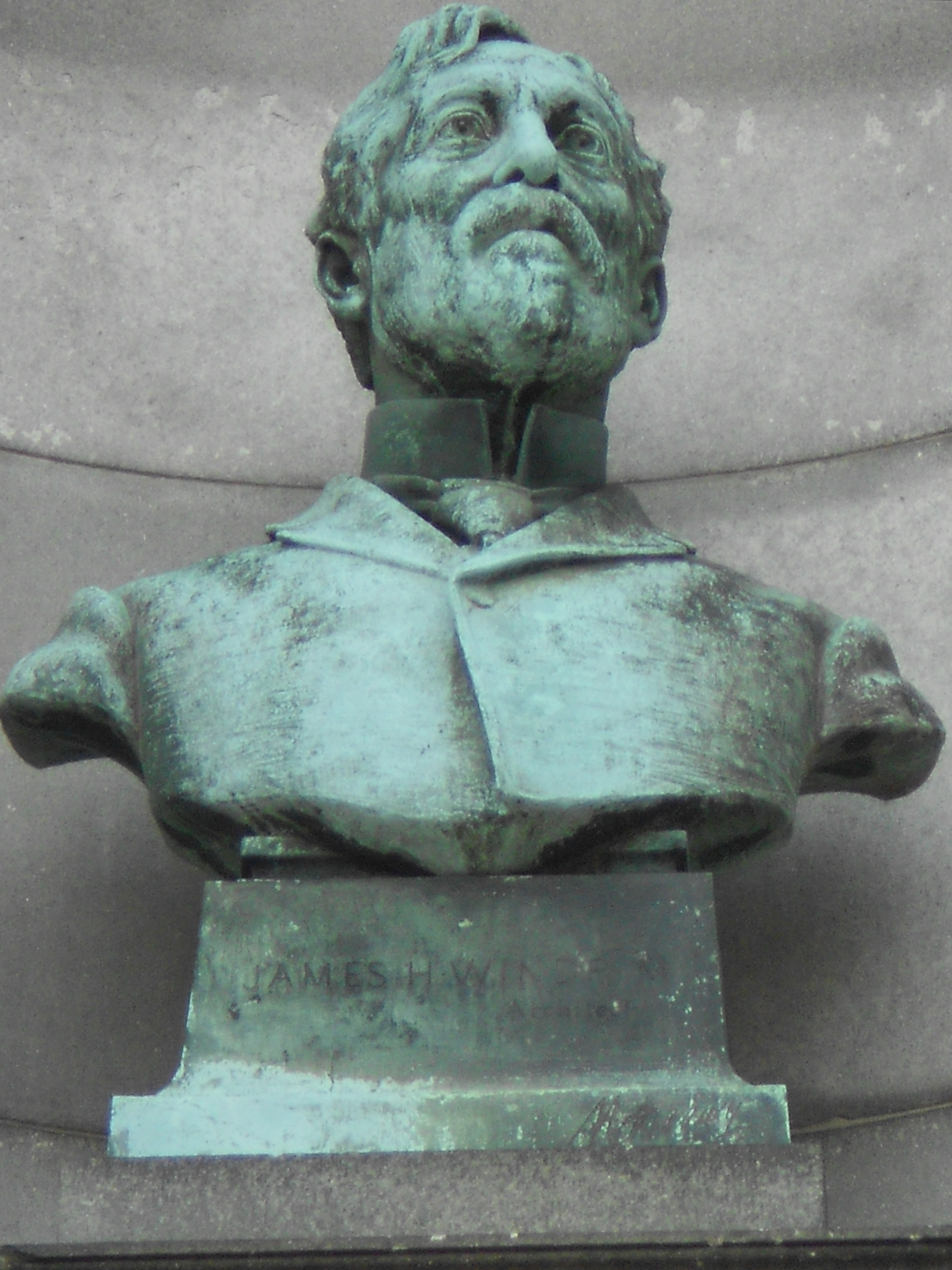
James Windrim, architect

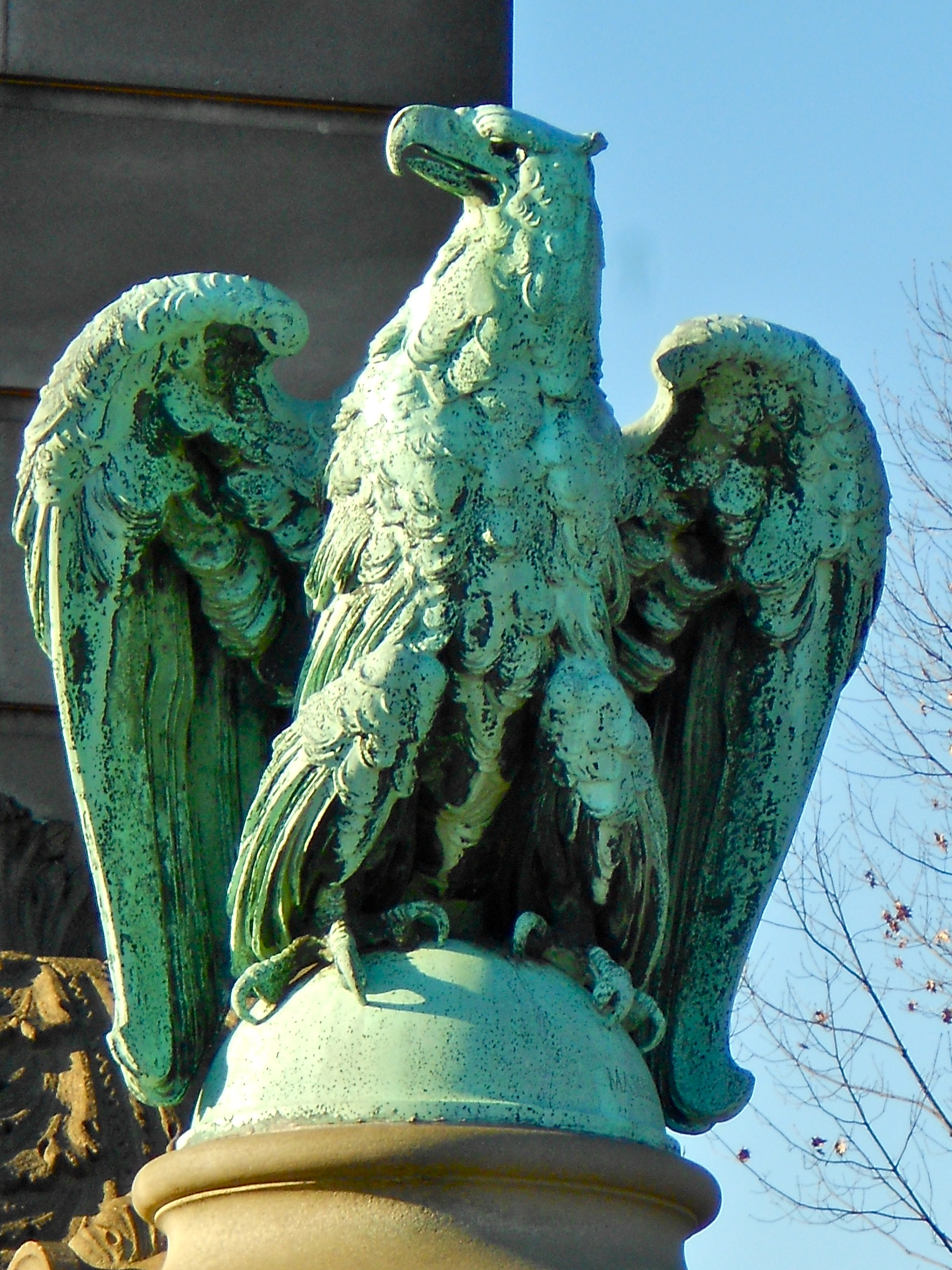
Eagle by John Massey Rhind

- Major General George Gordon Meade by Daniel Chester French (atop south column).
- Major General John Fulton Reynolds by Charles Grafly (atop north column).
- Richard Smith (donor of the Memorial) by Herbert Adams (on pedestal of north column).

=== Equestrian statues ===
- Major General George B. McClellan by Edward Clark Potter (atop south pier).
- Major General Winfield Scott Hancock by John Quincy Adams Ward (atop north pier).

=== Busts ===
- Major General John F. Hartranft by Alexander Stirling Calder.
- Major General Samuel W. Crawford by Bessie Potter Vonnoh.
- General James Addams Beaver by Katherine M. Cohen.
- Admiral David Dixon Porter by Charles Grafly.
- Admiral John A. B. Dahlgren by George Bissell.
- Governor Andrew Gregg Curtin by Moses Jacob Ezekiel.
- James H. Windrim (architect of the Memorial) by Samuel Murray.
- John B. Gest (executor of Richard Smith's estate) by Charles Grafly.

=== Other sculpture ===
- Two eagles standing on globes by John Massey Rhind.
- Eight bas-relief allegorical figures such as Courage and Heroism, also by Rhind
- The Memorial's frieze is carved with the names of 84 Pennsylvania veterans.
- The Memorial's inscription reads:

THIS
MONUMENTAL MEMORIAL
PRESENTED BY
RICHARD SMITH
TYPE FOUNDER
OF PHILADELPHIA –
IN MEMORY OF
PENNSYLVANIANS WHO
TOOK PART IN THE CIVIL WAR
THEIR STRIFE WAS NOT FOR
AGGRANDIZEMENT AND WHEN
CONFLICT CEASED THE NORTH
WITH THE SOUTH UNITED AGAIN
TO ENJOY THE COMMON HERITAGE
LEFT BY THE FATHERS OF OUR
COUNTRY RESOLVING THAT
THEREAFTER ALL OUR PEOPLE
SHOULD DWELL TOGETHER

IN UNITY.

== Sources ==
- Fairmount Park Art Association, Sculpture of a City: Philadelphia's Treasures in Bronze and Stone (New York: Walker Publishing Company, 1974), pp. 168–179.
- Penny Balkin Bach, Public Art in Philadelphia (Philadelphia: Temple University Press, 1992), p. 208.
