= Lillian Gest =

American writer, alpinist and social worker (1897–1986)

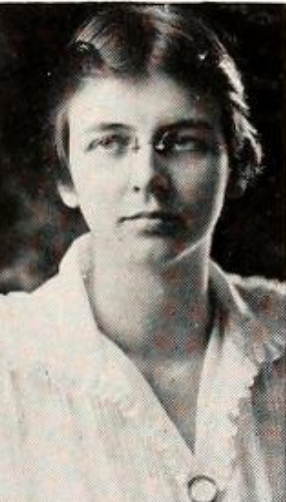
- Lillian Gest, from the 1919 yearbook of Vassar College
- Born: May 29, 1897; Merion, Pennsylvania, U.S.
- Died: January 4, 1986 (age 88); Newtown Square, Pennsylvania, U.S.
- Occupations: Writer, social worker
- Relatives: John B. Gest (grandfather)

Lillian Gest (May 29, 1897 – January 4, 1986) was an American writer, alpinist, and social worker. She was president of the Philadelphia Children's Bureau. She was described as "an indefatigable lover of the Canadian Alps" and "one of the most celebrated climbers in the Canadian Rockies".

== Early life and education ==
Gest was born in Merion, Pennsylvania, the daughter of William Purves Gest and Isabel Thorn Howell Gest. Her father was a lawyer and a bank president, as was her grandfather, John B. Gest. She graduated from Vassar College in 1919. She earned a master's degree in social work from the University of Pennsylvania in 1931.

== Career ==
Gest's family discouraged her from seeking paid employment, saying "it was not right when she did not need to". She lived and volunteered at a settlement house, was president of the Philadelphia Children's Bureau and vice president of the Philadelphia Children's Aid Society. She was an active member of the Philadelphia Skating Club, and the League of Women Voters, and a founder of the Philadelphia Trail Club.

Gest traveled every summer to avoid spending the hottest months in Philadelphia. She hiked in the Swiss Alps in 1929, but she was best known for her hikes in Montana, Wyoming, and the Canadian Rockies, She was part of a trend, of women touring in the Canadian Rockies in the 1930s. She worked with hike organizer Caroline Hinman or mountain guide Christian Haesler Jr., and with the Alpine Club of Canada. She and British climber Kate Gardiner climbed Mount Bryce and Quéant Mountain in 1937; Polly Prescott and Marguerite Schnellbacher were other climbing companions. She climbed Mount Columbia in 1938. She was a longtime member of the American Alpine Club (AAC), and she was founding editor of the club's publication, the American Alpine Club News, from 1951 to 1959. She wrote about the Rockies in three books, and spoke about her travels to community groups.

== Publications ==
- "Mt. Assiniboine and Mt. Eon" (1935)
- History of Lake O'Hara in the Canadian Rockies at Hector, British Columbia, Canada (1961)
- History of Morraine Lake in the Canadian Rockies East of Lake Louise, Alberta (1970)
- History of Mount Assiniboine in the Canadian Rockies (1979)

== Personal life and legacy ==
Gest lived with her mother in Merion, into the 1950s; her mother died in 1954. Gest died in 1986, at the age of 88, in Newtown Square. There is a collection of her papers in the Whyte Museum of the Canadian Rockies. The Whyte Museum digitized Gest's films and slides in the 2020s.
