= Mary Emery =

American philanthropist

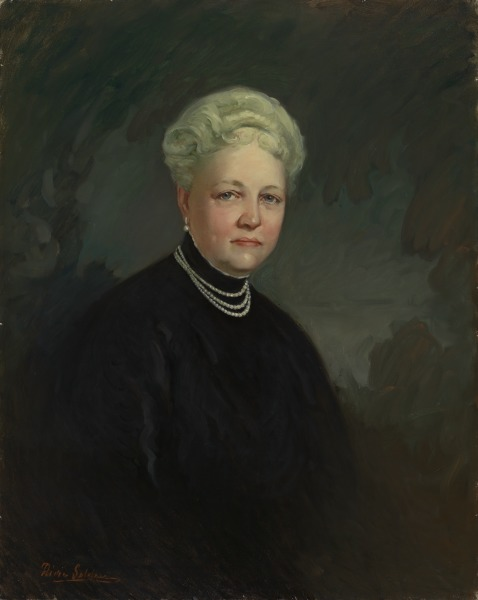
Mary M. Emery, painted by Dixie Selden

Mary Emery (née Hopkins; December 19, 1844–October 12, 1927) was an American philanthropist.

== Biography ==
Mary Emery was born to parents Richard Hopkins and Mary Barr Denny Muhlenberg in 1844. In 1862, Mary and her family moved to Cincinnati, Ohio from Brooklyn, New York. Mary was educated at the Packer Collegiate Institute in Brooklyn and excelled in advanced mathematics and astronomy. She married Thomas J. Emery in 1866. Thomas was the oldest son of a businessman, whose empire of candle manufacturing, real estate, and housing construction would soon grow exponentially. They had two sons together, Sheldon and Albert. Albert was killed in a sledding accident while at prep school. Together, the couple bought an enormous estate called "Mariemont" near Newport, Rhode Island. Upon the death of her husband, Mary became a generous philanthropist and benefactor. In her final years, she recognized her "vast responsibility" and began funding various orphanages, colleges, hospitals, and schools with the enormous fortune she inherited upon her husband's death. She avoided publicity as much as possible for her donations. In 1923, she funded the planned community of Mariemont, Ohio, named after her estate in Rhode Island. She died four years later in 1927.
