= John B. Gest =

American banker and lawyer (1823–1907)

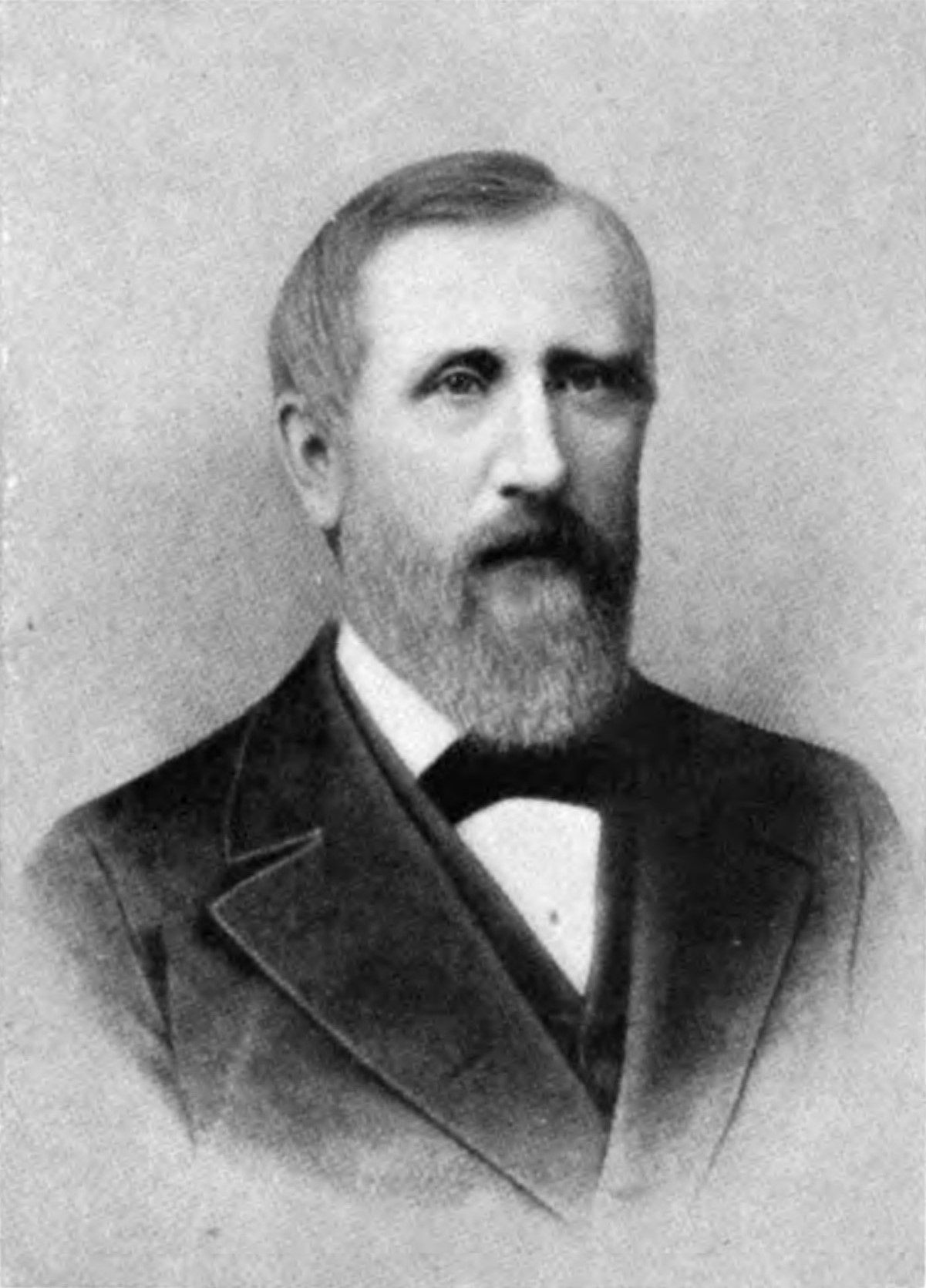
- Born: November 4, 1823; Philadelphia, Pennsylvania, United States
- Died: March 1, 1907 (aged 83); Philadelphia, Pennsylvania, United States
- Occupations: Lawyer, banker

John Barnard Gest (November 4, 1823 – March 1, 1907) was a banker and lawyer in Philadelphia, Pennsylvania.

== Biography ==
Gest was born in Philadelphia on November 4, 1823, to merchant John Gest and Ann Barnard, and was educated at various private schools. He attended the University of Pennsylvania, where he became a member of the university's chapter of Phi Beta Kappa and president of the Zelosophic Society, a knowledge and debating club. He graduated in 1844, studied law under Charles Ingersoll, and was admitted to practice law in 1847. He ran a private practice, becoming "widely known because of his large practice in real estate, patent, and insurance law," as his New York Times obituary put it. In 1852, after the University of Pennsylvania added a law school, he re-enrolled and earned an LL.B.

Gest married Elizabeth Purves in 1852. They had four children together: John Marshall, William P., Alexander, and Lydia.

Gest was an active alumnus of his alma mater; he helped found its alumni association and chaired the committees that compiled the first three editions of the alumni list. In 1877, he was made a trustee of the university, in which post he served for more than a decade.

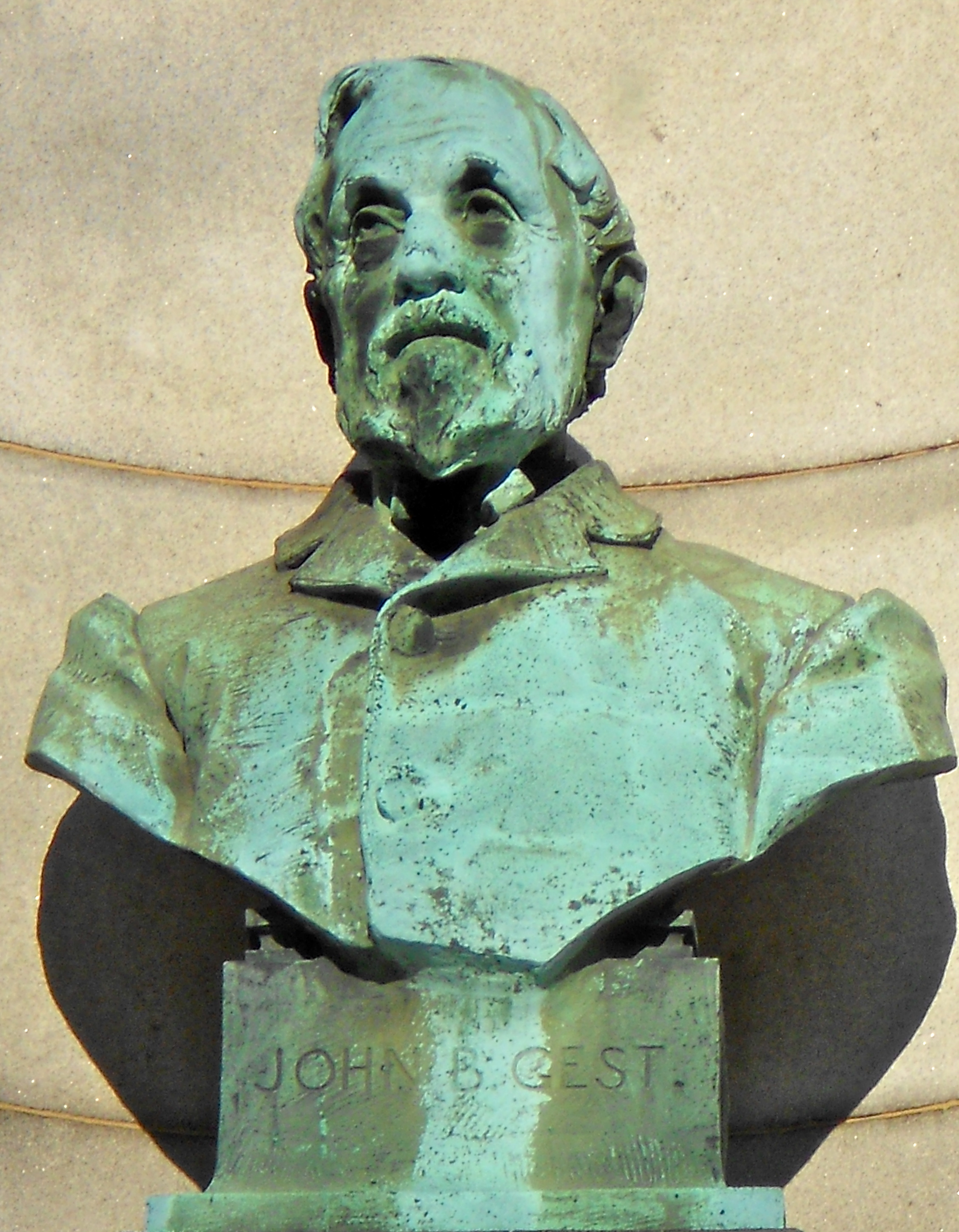
Bust of Gest at Smith Memorial Arch, a Philadelphia landmark he helped create

In 1872, Gest was appointed vice president of the Fidelity Insurance Trust and Safe Deposit Company. In 1890, he became president of the company, which went on to "a foremost place among the trust companies of the country" and became part of the largest bank merger of its time. He was also a director of the Mortgage Trust Company of Pennsylvania.

Gest was a leader of several nonprofit organizations that survive to this day. He served as president of the Union Benevolent Association, a charity organization founded in 1831; a council member of the Historical Society of Pennsylvania; and a trustee of Presbyterian Hospital. He became an elder of Overbrook Presbyterian Church after its founding in 1888.

In 1895, Gest oversaw the creation of Smith Memorial Arch in Philadelphia as executor of the will of wealthy Philadelphia printer Richard Smith. His bust appears alongside those of prominent Union admirals and generals and the inscription dedicating the arch "in memory of Pennsylvanians who took part in the Civil War."

In 1902, Gest was one of 1,560 "notable Philadelphians" whose portrait appeared in Moses King's Philadelphia and Notable Philadelphians.

== Death ==
Gest developed a severe case of bronchitis and died in Philadelphia on March 1, 1907, at the age of 83. His family's papers are held by the University of Pennsylvania archives.
