= Jean-Joseph Vadé =

French poet and playwright (1720–1757)

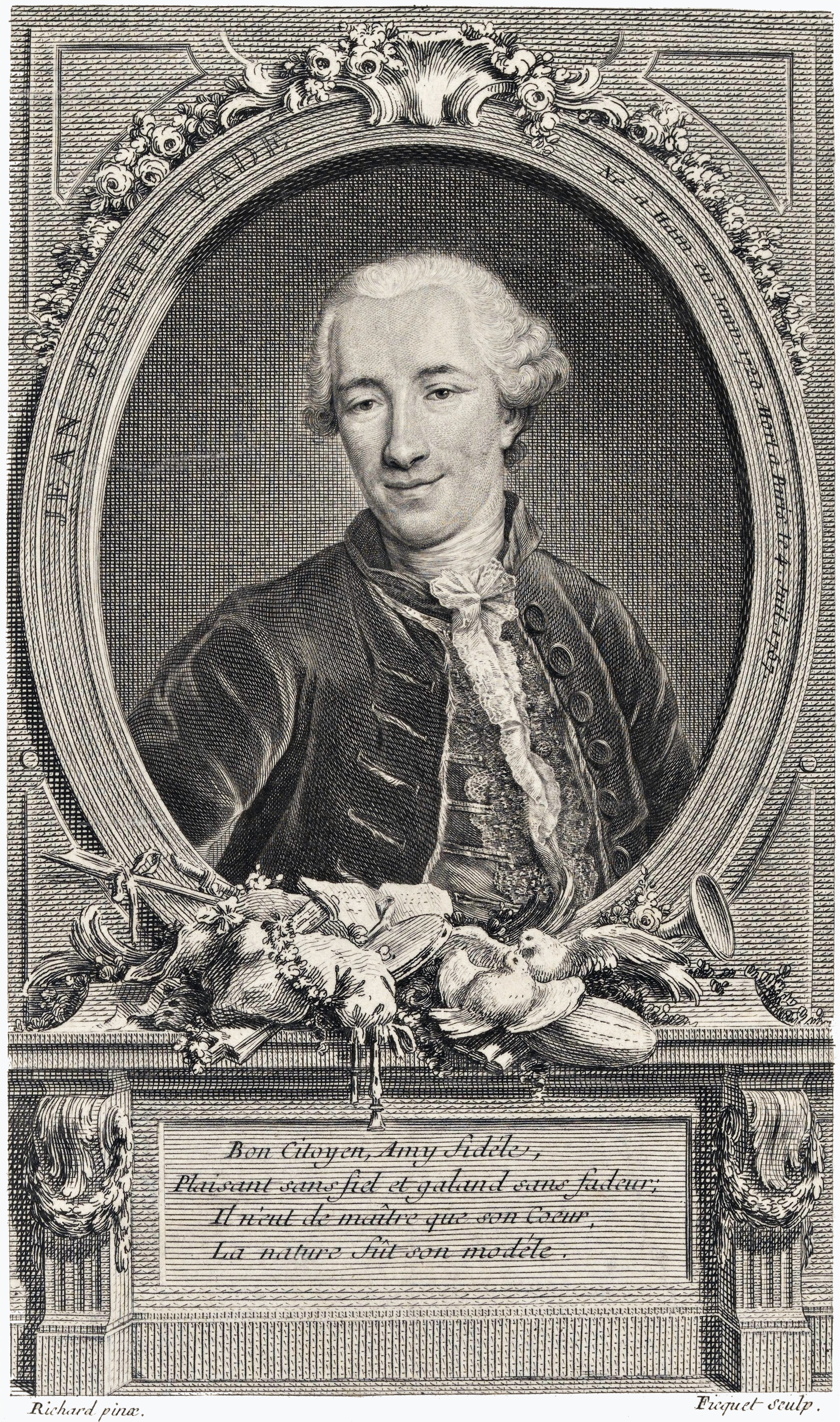
- Born: 17 January 1720; Ham, Picardy (province), France
- Died: 4 July 1757 (aged 37); Paris, France
- Occupations: Playwright, chansonnier

Jean-Joseph Vadé (17 January 1720 – 4 July 1757) was a French chansonnier and playwright of the 18th century.

== Biography ==
The son of Jacques Vadé, an innkeeper, Jean-Joseph went with his father to Paris in 1725. His studies suffered from his ebullient and lively character, and he could never learn Latin, but he knew how to correct the weakness of his education by reading the best authors on his own. At twenty, he obtained the position of controller of the vingtième (income tax) in Soissons, then in Laon, where he was noted for his wit and upbeat verve. In 1743, he left Laon to go to Rouen and became secretary of the Duke of Agenois for two years. Finally, he returned to Paris where his friends helped him find a new job in the office of the vingtième. It was around that time that he became known to the public for his effortless and graceful poems.

Occasionally a singer, Vadé participated in the singing society La Dominicale. He had a daughter, Marie Françoise Rose (c. 1756 – 1818), who played under the name Mademoiselle Vadé at the Comédie-Française in 1776 and 1777 and was succeeded the following year by Mademoiselle Mars.

He also had an illegitimate son, who married and became the father of the mother of the poet and goguettiere Élisa Fleury (1795–1862).

He died in July 1757 at age 37, following a painful operation.

== Work ==
=== Poetry and fables ===
Vadé published a series of fables that, without reaching the height of La Fontaine, said very good things in a nice form with graceful and charming amorous poems. He soon became famous, but having had the misfortune to become a little too close to the anti-philosophe Fréron, Voltaire never forgave him and never missed an opportunity to taunt and heap scorn on "this prank Vadé" (as he called him in a letter sent 7 September 1774 to Marie Du Deffand). Voltaire nevertheless gave Vadé the honor of signing several of his own works under the name Vadé.

=== Theatre ===
What earned Vadé a reputation as the creator of the genre poissard is that, in seeking by honest toil the way to live honestly, he turned to theater, for which, before composing a number of vaudevilles, parades and opéras comiques, he first tried to write serious plays. These attempts proved fruitless when Les Visites du jour de l’An, which premiered on 3 January 1749 at the Comédie-Française, was presented only once, or La Canadienne was never performed at all. Vadé then turned successfully to comedy theater at the Foire Saint-Laurent and the Foire Saint-Germain, where his parodies showed him to be a mocking spirit, but nevertheless a deep and careful observer of people. Vadé depicted characters of a healthy and robust nature, with merits and defects, without the vain ornaments or ridiculous cosmetics with which they were burdened at the time.

== Critics ==
Sternly criticized by Grimm, La Harpe and Collé who declared the poissard style "below nothing," Vadé had supporters and admirers, who called him the Teniers, the Callot of French poetry or the Corneille of Les Halles.

However, beyond Vadé's style (his trivial expressions, risqué phrases, burlesque), behind the poissard, Vadé's characters expressed in their dialog, a moral thought, which although sometimes hidden under a somewhat rough form, did not emerge less vigorously.

== Plays ==
- Folette ou l’Enfant gâté
- Il était temps
- Jérôme et Fanchonnette
- L’Impromptu du cœur
- La Canadienne
- La Fileuse
- La Fontaine de jouvence
- La Nouvelle Bastienne
- La Pipe cassée
- La Veuve indécise
- Le Bouquet du roi
- Le Confident heureux
- Le Mauvais plaisant ou le drôle de corps
- Le Paquet de mouchoirs
- Le Poirier
- Le Rien
- Le Suffisant ou le Petit maître dupé
- Le Trompeur trompé ou la rencontre imprévue
- Les Petits sculpteurs
- Les Quatre Bouquets poissards
- les Racoleurs
- Les Troqueurs
- Les Troyennes-en-Champagne
- Les Visites du jour de l’an ou Les Étrennes
- Nicaise

== Editions of his works ==
- Œuvres de M. Vadé ou Recueil des opéra-comique et parodies qu'il a donnés depuis quelques années, avec les airs, rondes et vaudeville notés et autres ouvrages du même auteur. La Haye : Gosse, 1771. - 4 v. in 2. 17 cm. Contains:
  - Tome 1 : La pipe cassée, Quatre bouquets poissards, Lettres de la grenouillere, La fileuse, Le poirier, Le bouquet du roi, Le suffisant.
  - Tome 2 : Les troqueurs, Le rien, Airs choisis des troqueurs, Le trompeur trompé, Recueil de chansons, Il étoit tems, La nouvelle Bastienne, La fontaine de jouvence, Airs de la fontaine de jouvence.
  - Tome 3 : Les troyennes en Champagne, Jérosme et Fanchonnette, Le confident heureux, Folette ou l'enfant gaté, . Compliment de la clôture de la foire de S. Laurent.
  - Tome 4. : Nicaise. L'impromptu du cœur, La Canadienne, Le mauvais plaisant.
- Œuvres complètes ou recueil des opéra-comiques de Jean-Joseph Vadé, Paris, [s.n.], 1800
- Œuvres de M. Vadé, ou Recueil des opéra-comiques, parodies & pièces fugitives de cet auteur; avec les airs, rondes & vaudevilles notés, La Haye, Pierre Gosse, 1785
- Œuvres complètes de Vadé, Genéve, [s.n.], 1777. (deuxieme et troisieme tome preserve)

== Works available online ==
- Lettres de la Grenouillère; suivies de Quatre bouquets poissards, avec notice par Georges d’Heylli; eau-forte par Guillaumot fils, Paris, [s.n.], 1885

== Bibliography ==
- Georges Lecocq, Poésies et lettres facétieuses de Joseph Vadé, Paris, A. Quantin, 1879
- Charles Lenient, La Comédie en France au XIXe, Paris, Hachette, 1888, p. 185
- Élie Fleury et Ernest Danicourt, Histoire populaire de la ville de Ham, p. 119 to 122, Ham, 1881 reprint, Paris, SEDOPOLS, 1984 ISBN 2-904 177-02-7 available at Gallica
