= Étienne Fessard =

French engraver (1714–1777)

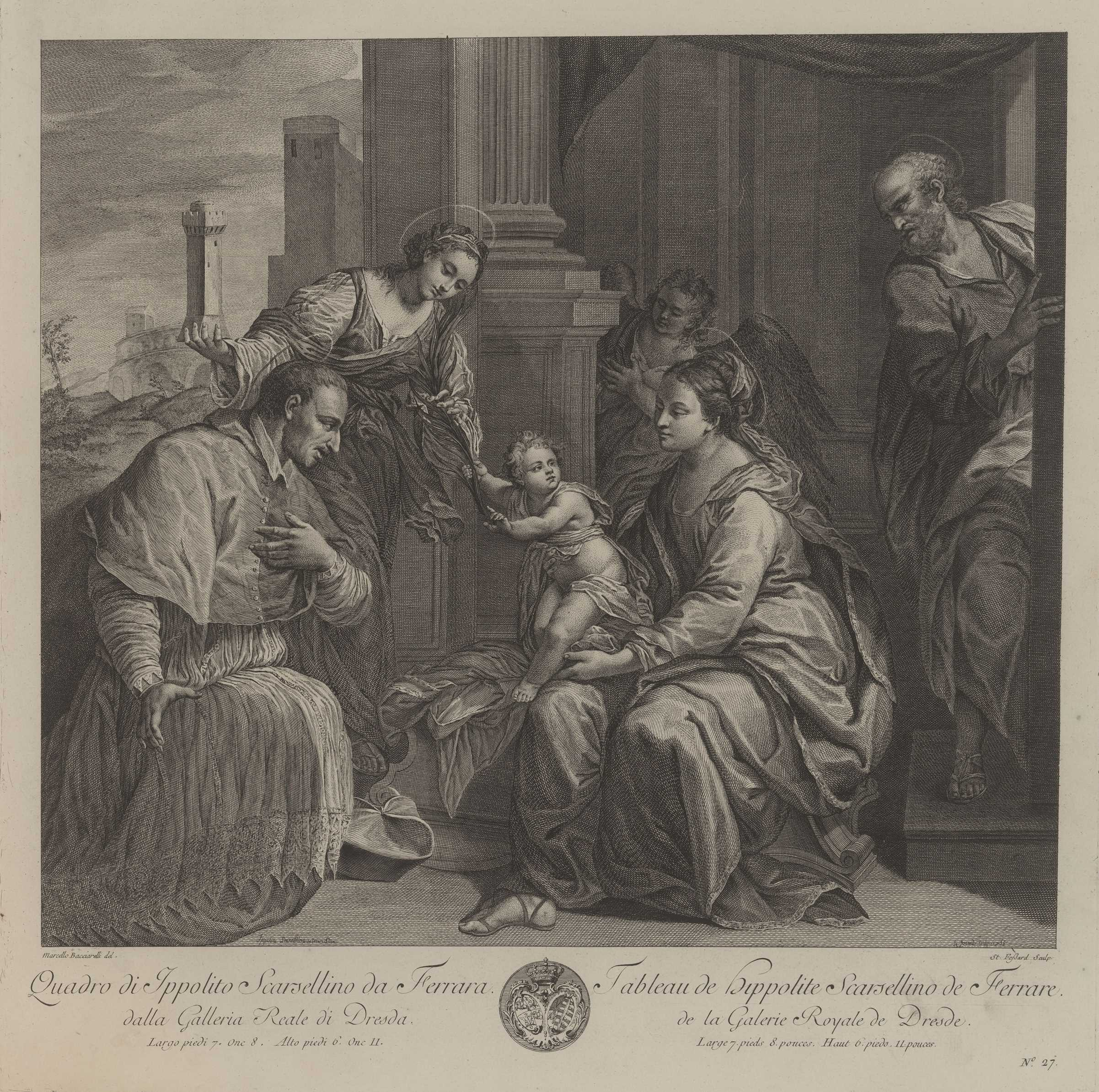
The Holy Family, with St. Charles Borromeo; after Scarsellino, ca. 1750

Étienne Fessard, a French engraver, was born in Paris in 1714. He was a pupil of Edme Jeaurat, and proved an artist of sufficient merit to be accepted for candidacy (agréé) at the Académie royale de peinture et de sculpture (1753). A protegé of le comte de Caylus, whom he may have assisted in the development of skill in etching, Fessard received the appointment Engraver of the King's Library (graveur de la Bibliothèque du Roi) in 1756, with responsibility for the engravings of the royal collection of paintings and drawings, as a result of Caylus' influence. On his death in 1777, the position was given to his student Augustin de Saint-Aubin. Fessard executed a considerable number of plates, but his efforts to resume the engraving of the King's paintings did not obtain the support of the Académie royale and resulted in only two plates: "Feste Flamande" after Rubens and "L'Empire de Flore" after Poussin.

== Portraits ==
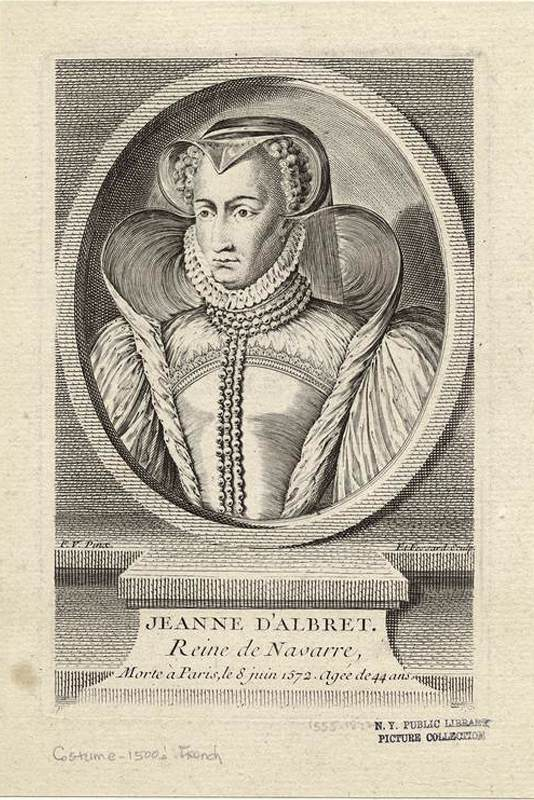
Jeanne d'Albret, Queen of Navarre

- Hortensia Mancini, Duchess of Mazarin; after Ferdinand.
- Marie Madeleine de Lavergne, Countess de La Fayette; after the same.
- J. P. de Bougainville, of the French Academy; after C. N. Cochin.
- The Marquis de Mirabeau; after Van Loo.
- The Duke de Choiseul; after the same.

== Subjects after various masters ==
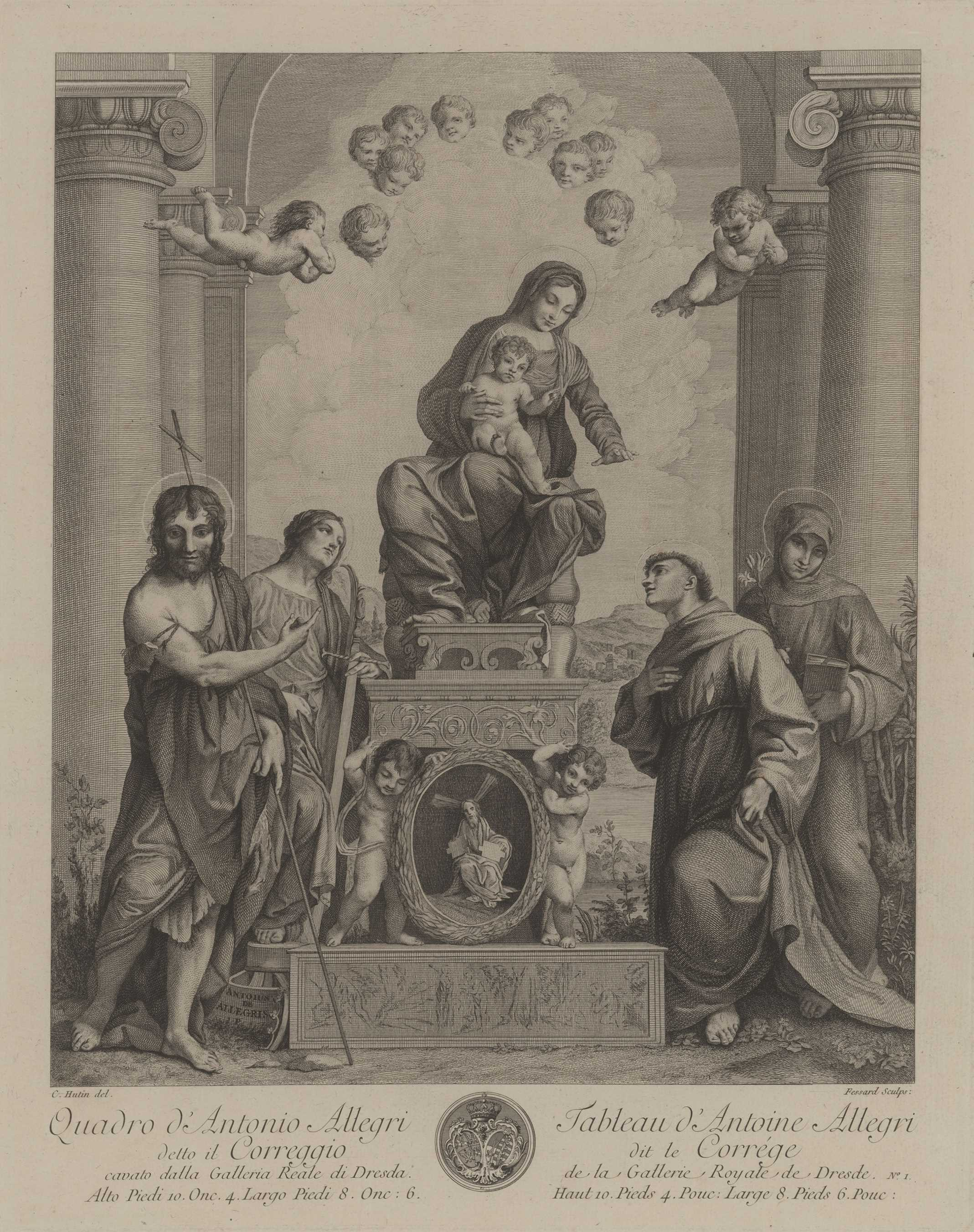
The Virgin enthroned, with SS. Francis, John, and Catharine; after Correggio, ca. 1750

- Diana and Actaeon; after Giacomo Bassano; for the Crozat Collection.
- The Virgin enthroned, with SS. Francis, John, and Catharine; after Correggio.
- The Holy Family, with St. Charles Borromeo; after Scarsellino.
- The Four Liberal Arts, personified by Children; four plates; after C. van Loo.
- Jupiter and Antiope; after the same. 1758.
- Herminia armed as Clorinda; after J. B. Pierre.
- The Birth of Venus; after F. de Troy.
- Jupiter and Leda; after the same.
- The Triumph of Galatea; after Bouchardon; etched by Count de Caylus, and finished by Fessard.
- The Triumph of Bacchus; after the same; etched by Count de Caylus, and finished by Fessard.
- The Nativity; after Boucher.
- A Flemish Festival; after Rubens. 1762.
- Psyche abandoned by Cupid; after Le Moine.
