= A Street Show in Paris =

Painting by Gabriel de Saint-Aubin

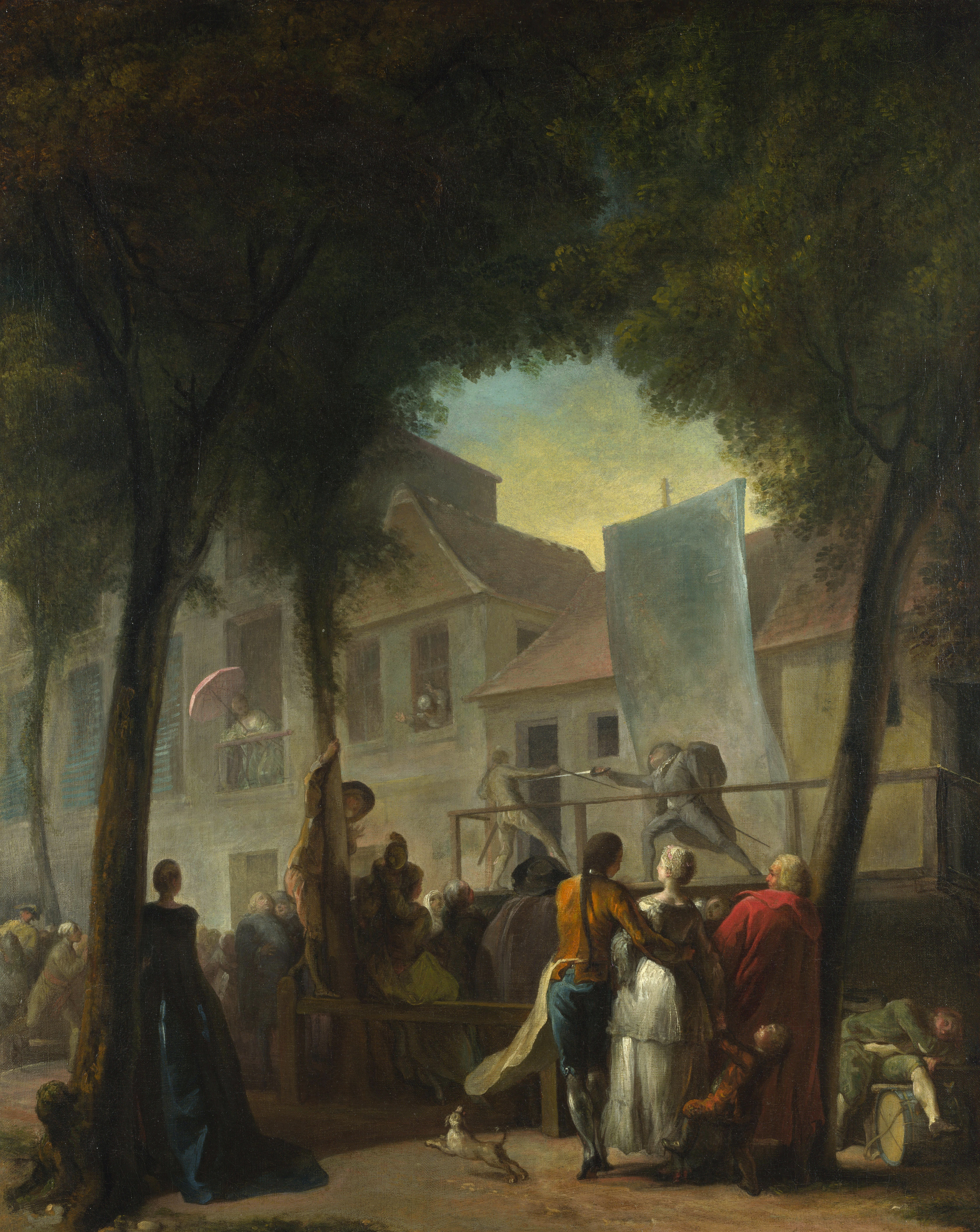
- Artist: Gabriel de Saint-Aubin
- Year: 1760
- Type: Oil on canvas, genre painting
- Dimensions: 80 cm × 64.1 cm (31 in × 25.2 in)
- Location: National Gallery; London

A Street Show in Paris (French: La Parade du Boulevard) is a 1760 genre painting by the French artist Gabriel de Saint-Aubin. It depicts a Parade, a form of street entertainment, on the boulevards of Paris. Beneath an arch of tall trees, a crowd watches a performance as two characters fight a duel. Saint-Aubin aspired to be a celebrated painter, but became best known as an illustrator. It was produced as an attempt to capitalise on the growing popularity of crowd scenes of everyday life in the French capital. He produced a pendant painting The Meeting on the Boulevard. The painting is in the collection of the National Gallery in London, having been acquired in 1907.

== Bibliography ==
- Bailey, Colin B. The Age of Watteau, Chardin, and Fragonard: Masterpieces of French Genre Painting. Yale University Press, 2003.
- Levey, Michael. Painting and Sculpture in France, 1700-1789. Yale University Press, 1993.
