= La Dominicale =

La Dominicale or Société des dominicaux was an 18th-century goguette (singing society), founded in 1759 and active for many years.

It disappeared during the French Revolution after counting among its ranks Jean-Joseph Vadé (died 1757) and Claude Prosper Jolyot de Crébillon (died 1777).

Its longevity was not exceptional; other singing societies, such as the Joyeux in Belleville, Paris or the Lice chansonnière, for example, also existed for a long time.

== Description of la Dominicale ==
Arthur Dinaux wrote:

M. Louis, famous surgeon, met every Sunday for dinner as cheerful as he was. This meeting, known as the Dominicale, was increased by the admission of some debris from the seconde société du Caveau. Of all the chansonnières societies, the Dominicale is perhaps the only one which derogated from the law that all had been made, we do not know for what reason, not to admit women into their womb. The kind and witty Sophie Arnould was therefore admitted to these dinners which she enlivened with her fine projections and by a lively and delicate spirit which excited noble emulation among all the guests. Much more, she lent the help of her charming voice to highlight the works of the chansonniers who met there, Vadé, Crébillon filsBarré, Coqueley de Chaussepierre, experienced in turn that there was no kind of song that Sophie's talent could not accredit. This is what it would be easy to prove if this company, less stingy with what was exclusively intended for it, had delivered to the impression of merry trifles which remained handwritten and which it would be very difficult to find. The dispersal of the guests of the Dominicale did not take place until the Revolution came to impose silence on so many songs and to close so many places of entertainment.

{Œuvres choisies by Pierre Laujon). Dîners joyeux pages 237–387, volume IV. Paris, Léopold Collin, 1811, in-8.}

== The admission of Sophie Arnould to la Dominicale ==
However, around the same time (1759) the Sunday Society was formed, because it held its sittings on Sundays.

Sophie Arnould, driven by curiosity, cute sin of women, wanted to know this committee of letters and arts and came one day the first, she mysteriously stood behind a screen, and when the last of the guests had arrived, she appeared and said with a laugh, "Gentlemen, don't refuse a colleague. Finally, her acceptance speech was so spiritually turned that she was accepted as a member by acclamation.

== Sources ==
- Arthur Dinaux Les sociétés badines, bachiques, littéraires et chantantes, leur histoire et leurs travaux, Bachelin-Deflorenne, Paris 1867.

== See also ==
- Concert des Enfants de Bacchus
- Société du Caveau
- Gymnase lyrique
- Pot-au-Feu (société chantante)
- Le Cornet
- Goguette
- Société festive et carnavalesque
