= Marie-Françoise de Saint-Aubin =

French artist (1753–1822)

Marie-Françoise de Saint-Aubin (1753–1822) was a French artist.

Born in Paris, Saint-Aubin was the daughter of Charles Germain de Saint Aubin; her uncles were the noted artists Augustin and Gabriel de Saint-Aubin. She married one Jacques-Roch Donnebecq, plumassier du roi, in 1773, but separated from him twenty years later. A number of drawings by Marie-Françoise, dating to the early 1770s, may be found among those in the Livre des Saint-Aubin, now in the Louvre. These are in various media; some contain pastel.
