= Parade (French street entertainment) =

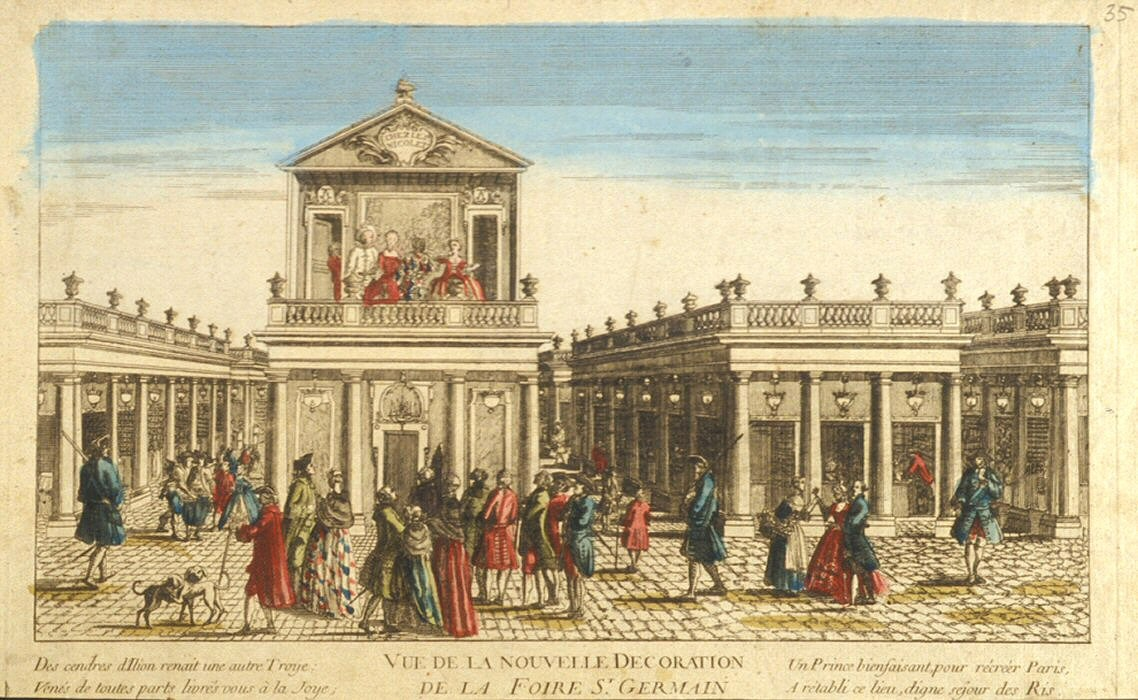
A parade being performed on the balcony of Nicolet's theatre at the Foire Saint-Germain (ca. 1763). One of the commedia dell'arte characters is the white-faced clown Gilles.

A parade is a type of French street entertainment which originated during the Renaissance. It consisted of a group of entertainers, which could include actors, singers, dancers, jugglers, and other types of performers, who took part in parades (in the usual sense of the word) and entertained spectators at those times when the procession stopped moving.

In the 18th century the term was applied to short improvisational buffooneries, typically incorporating vulgarities, which were performed either on an outdoor platform or a balcony in order to entice passersby into show-booths and theatres at the fairs or on the Boulevard du Temple. The characters were often drawn from the commedia dell'arte tradition. According to Elizabeth Bartlet "the humour was of the crudest sort, relying on sexual innuendos or even explicit remarks and actions, obscene gestures and references to defecation and other bodily functions."

The parades strongly influenced the 18th-century genre of comédie-parade, a type of play or opéra-comique, usually in one act, which also used characters from the commedia dell'arte. These pieces were a bit more refined and polite, at least when presented in public theatres.

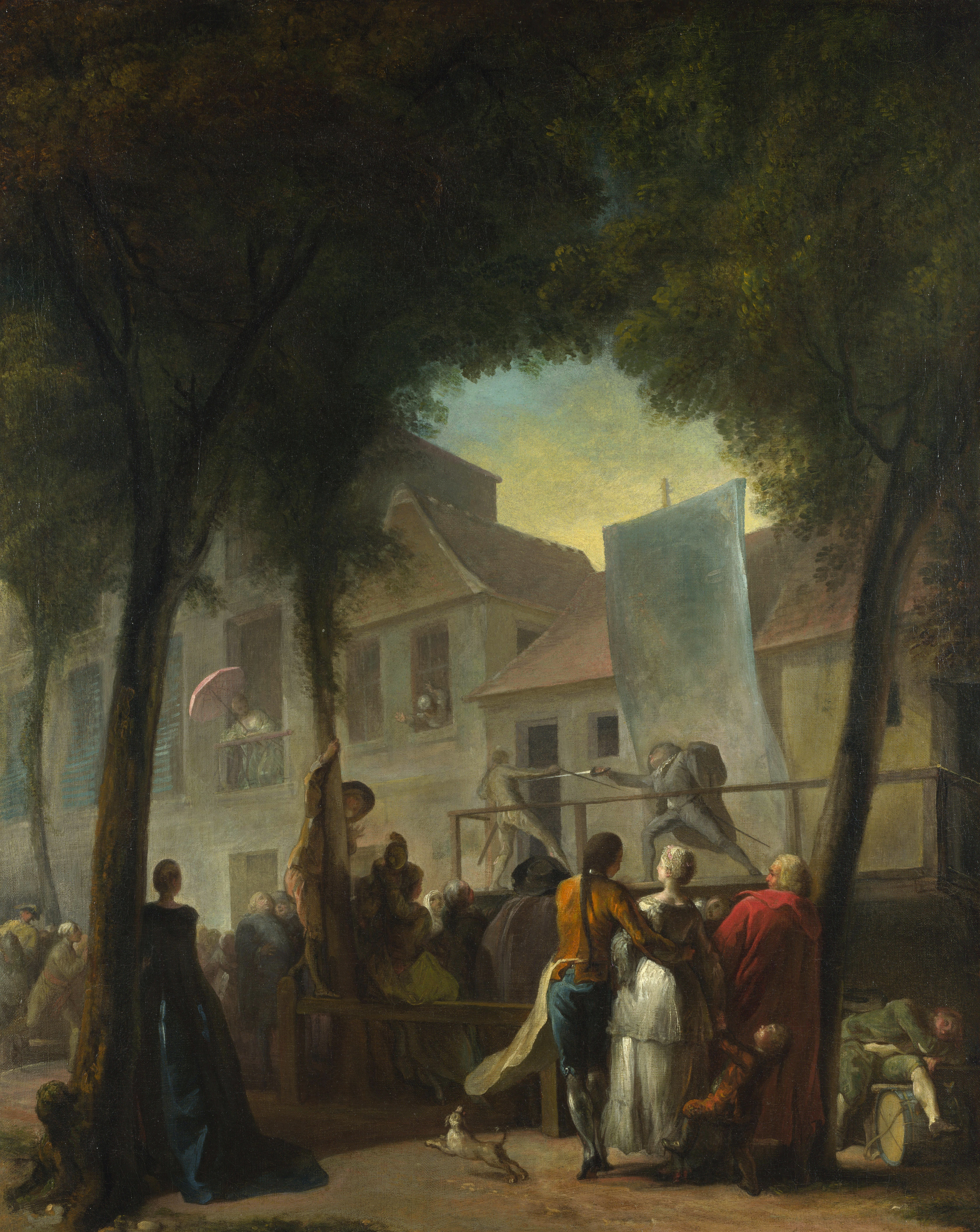
A parade shown in A Street Show in Paris by Gabriel de Saint-Aubin (National Gallery, 1760)

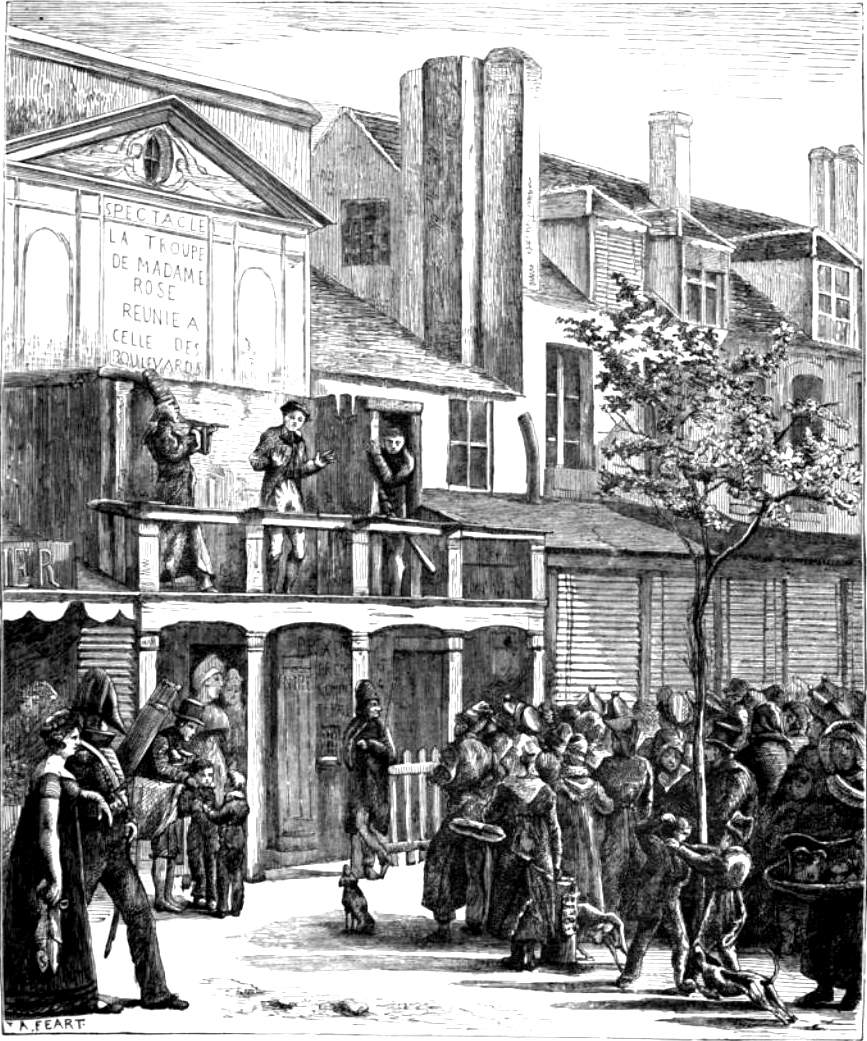
A parade on the Boulevard du Temple (1816)

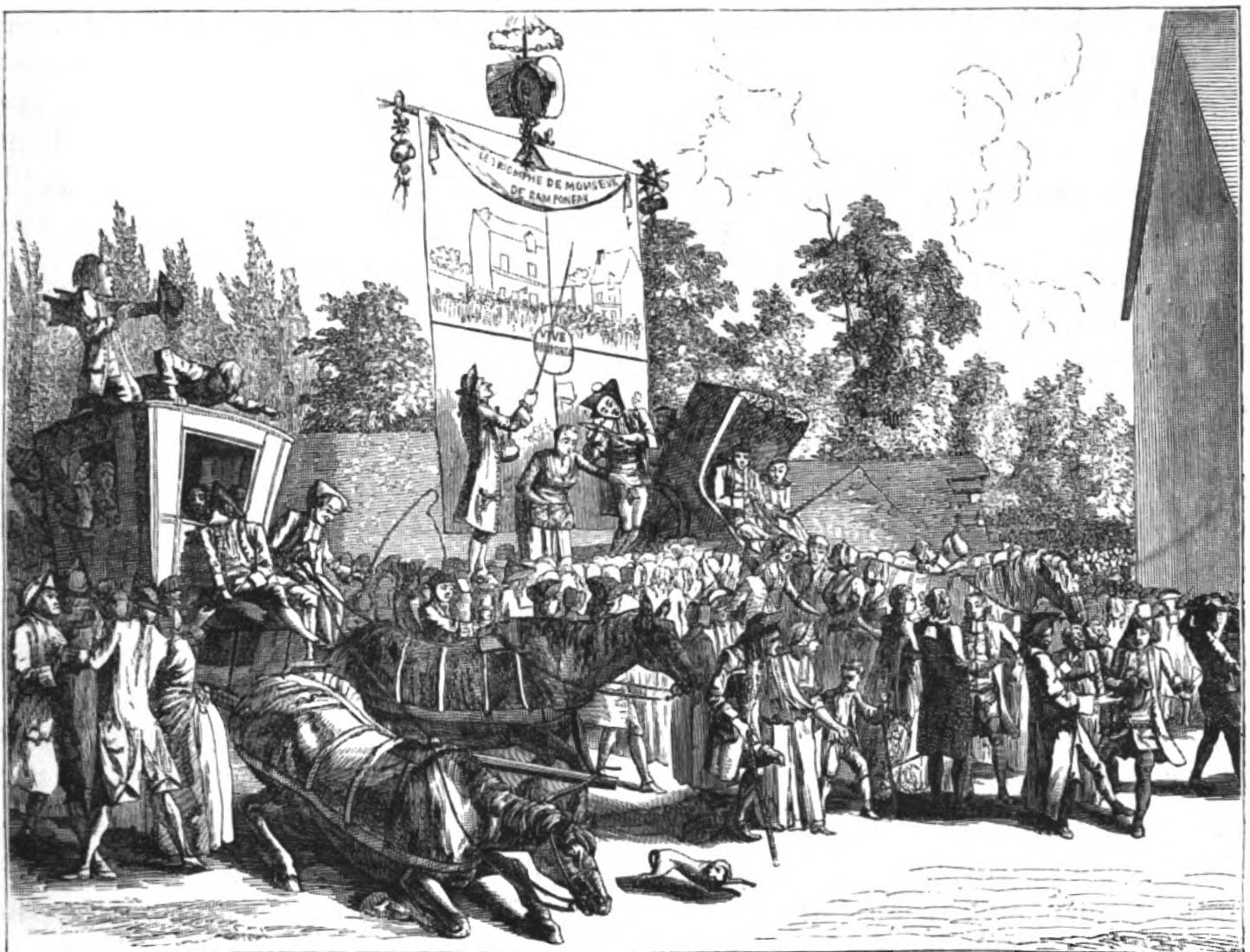
A parade of acrobatics at the entrance to the cabaret of Ramponneau (18th century)

== Sources ==
- Londré, Felicia Hardison (1991). The History of World Theatre: From the English Restoration to the Present. New York: Continuum. ISBN 978-0-8264-0485-5.
- Sadie, Stanley, editor (1992). The New Grove Dictionary of Opera (4 volumes). London: Macmillan. ISBN 978-1-56159-228-9.
