= Charles Germain de Saint Aubin =

French draftsman and embroidery designer

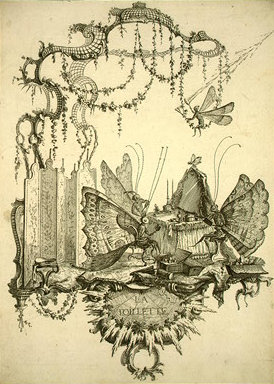
Engraving by Charles Germain de Saint Aubin

Charles Germain de Saint Aubin (17 January 1721 – 6 March 1786) was a French draftsman and embroidery designer to King Louis XV. Published a classic reference on embroidery, L'Art du Brodeur ("Art of the Embroiderer") in 1770. In addition to his embroidery designs, he was known for his drawings and engravings.

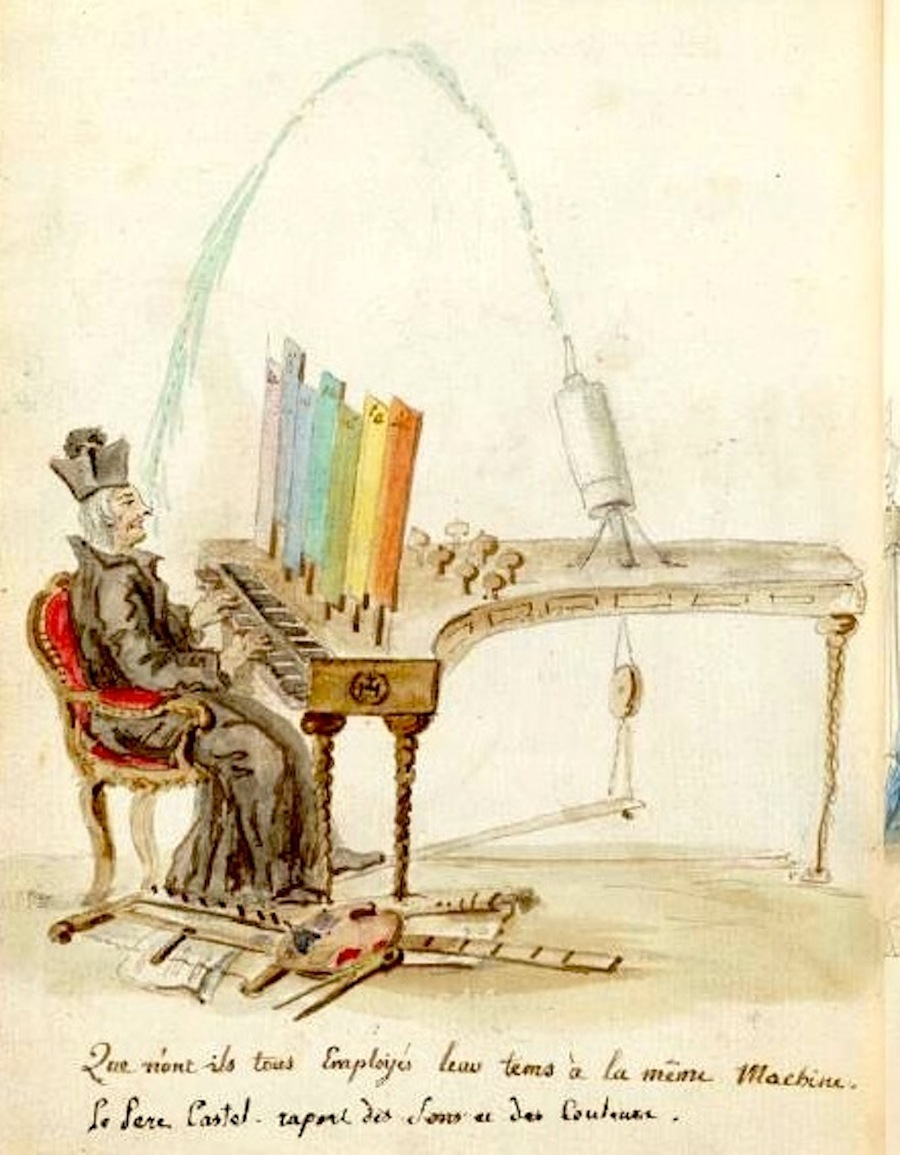
A caricature of Louis-Bertrand Castel's "ocular organ" by Charles Germain de Saint Aubin

His parents were Germain de Saint-Aubin and Anne Boissay, themselves both professional embroiderers. His younger brothers, Gabriel-Jacques de Saint-Aubin and Augustin de Saint-Aubin, were also well-respected artists. His daughter, Marie-François, was an artist as well.

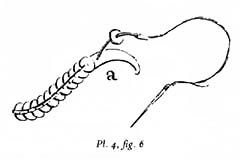
Illustration taken from L'Art du Brodeur showing a method of embroidering with paillettes

== Sources ==
- E. et J. de Goncourt, L'Art du XVIIIe siècle, Les Saint-Aubin
- Charles Germain de Saint-Aubin, Works of Art (National Gallery of Art)
- Men in the fiber arts.
- Textile Production in Europe: Embroidery, 1600–1800 (Metropolitan Museum of Art)
- E. and J. de Goncourt, The Art of the eighteenth century, the Saint-Aubin
- Catalog of rare and valuable component library M. Hippolyte Destailleur; Paris books: D. Morgand, 1891. 8 °, 448 p.
