= Augustin de Saint-Aubin =

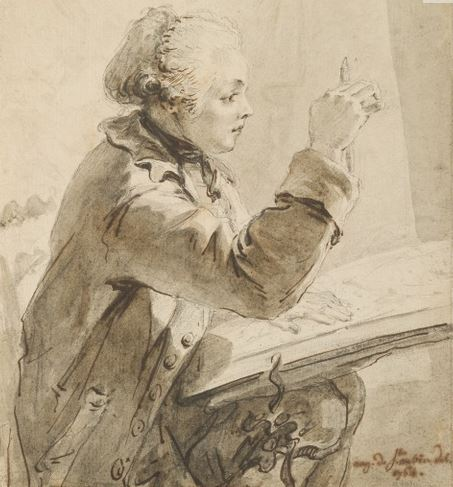
- Self portrait Augustin de Saint-Aubin, 1764
- Born: 3 January 1736; Paris, France
- Died: 9 November 1807 (aged 71); Paris, France
- Occupation: engraver
- Years active: 1752–1800

Augustin de Saint-Aubin sometimes styled Auguste de Saint-Aubin (3 January 1736 – 9 November 1807), belongs to an important dynasty of French designers and engravers.

== Biography ==
Augustin de Saint-Aubin was born on 3 January 1736 in Paris to the king's embroiderer Gabriel Germain de Saint-Aubin (1696–1756). He came from a family of artists and designers, which included his six siblings: brothers Charles-Germain de Saint-Aubin and Gabriel-Jacques de Saint-Aubin, as well as Catherine Louise, Louis-Michel, Athanasius, and Agathe, who were collectively known as the "Book of Saint-Aubin". His niece, Marie-François, daughter of Charles, was an artist as well.

Trained by his brother, he later studied with Étienne Fessard, Nicolas-Henry Tardieu and Laurent Cars. His first submission to the Salon was an etching in 1752. He was approved by the Académie Royale in 1771, but did not graduate, as he failed to submit one of the required reception pieces. He took many commissions for commercial purposes like bookplates, frontispieces, invitations, tradesmen's cards, and programs, but also illustrated books such as the Decameron by Boccaccio.

In 1776 he was appointed as the official engraver at the Bibliothèque Royale (Royal Library). He later worked on etching the collection of antique gems owned by the Duc d'Orléans. Emmanuel Bocher's 1879 catalog contains over 1300 works by Augustin, but he is most remembered for his portraits and his engravings of portraits by Charles-Nicolas Cochin the younger (1715–1790). In his lifetime, Augustin was considered the most successful of the siblings, but he is the one about whom least is now known.

He was married to Louise-Nicole Godeau. He died 9 November 1807 in Paris.

== Selected works ==
=== Drawings ===
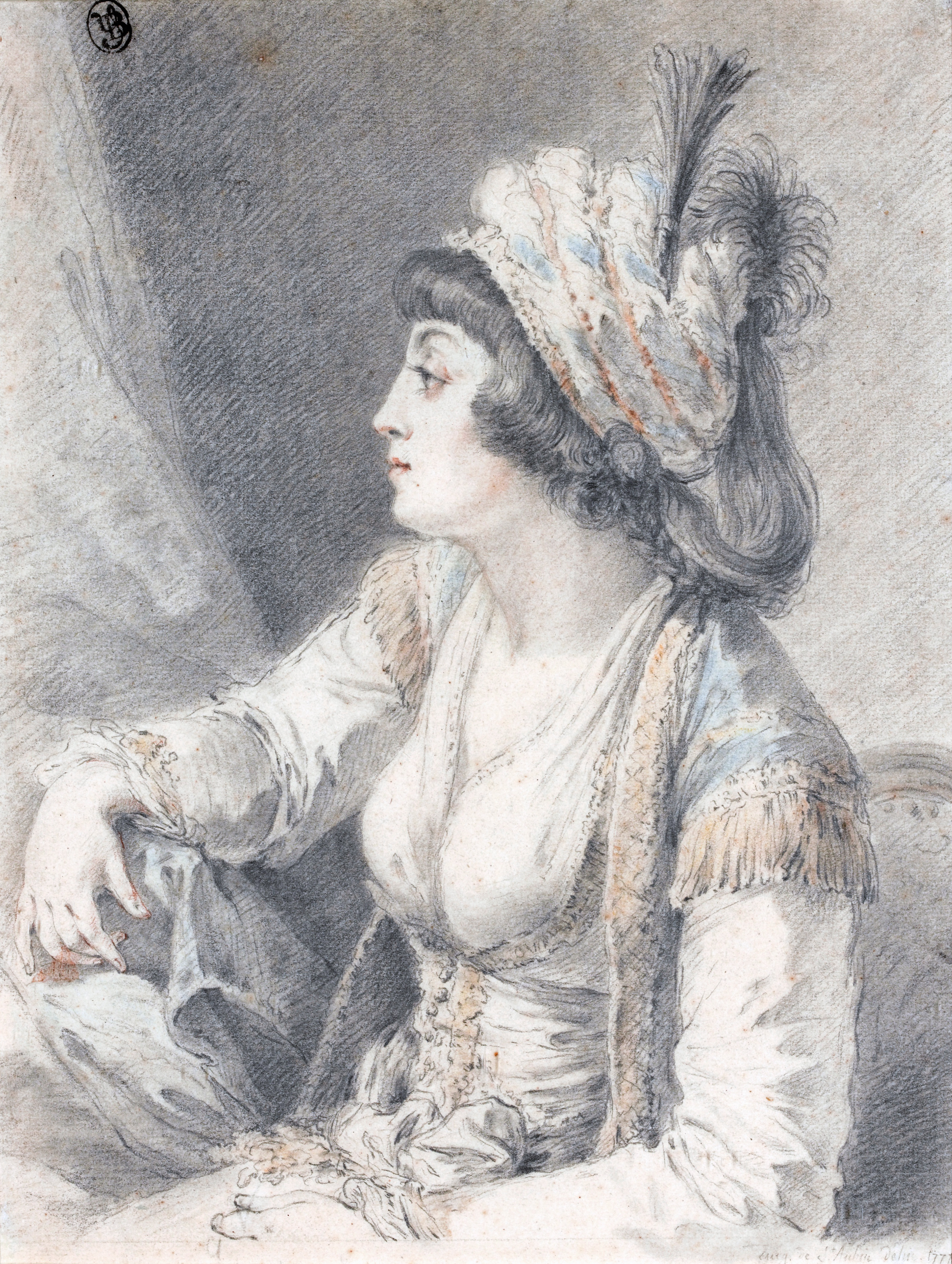
Validé ou la Sultane Mère (Augustin de Saint-Aubin, 1777)

- L'indiscrétion vengée
- Scène dans un intérieur rustique: jeune femme implorant le roi. Paris, Louvre Museum.
- Portrait de Rochambeau. Bayonne, Musée Bonnat.
- Feu d'artifice au bal de Saint-Cloud chez Griel, 1759. Paris, Louvre Museum.
- Portrait de Vivant-Dominique, baron Denon (1747–1825) de profil. Paris, Louvre Museum.
- Bal à Saint-Cloud chez Griel. Paris, Louvre Museum.
- Portrait d'une femme dans une chaise. University of Michigan Museum of Art.
- Dans le Livre des Saint-Aubin. Paris, Louvre Museum.

=== Engravings ===
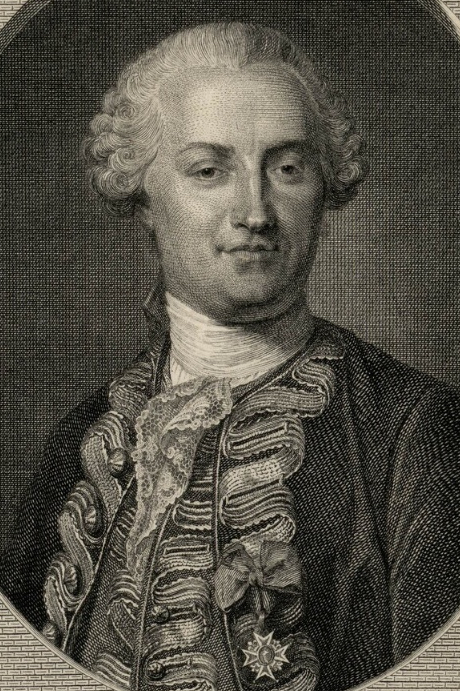
Marc René, marquis de Montalembert

- Portrait de Jean-François Marmontel illustrating his Contes moraux.
- Card to gain entry to the Concert bourgeois de la rue Saint-Antoine.
- L'art du brodeur. Museum of Fine Arts, Boston
- Galerie des Modes et Costumes Français in 3 volumes Museum of Fine Arts, Boston.
- Gravure d'après Gravelot (equestrian statue). Rothschild Collection, Paris, Louvre Museum.
- Jean-Baptiste-Joseph Languet de Gercy, parish priest of the Church of Saint-Sulpice, Paris, Doctor of the Sorbonne (1675–1750). He is the brother of Jean-Joseph Languet de Gergy. Versailles, Palace of Versailles and Grand Trianon.
- Marquise de Pompadour (1722–1764). Versailles, Palace of Versailles and Grand Trianon.
- Jean-Baptiste Lully, superintendent of the king's music (1633–1687). Versailles, Palace of Versailles and Grand Trianon.
- Thomas Corneille (1625–1709), writer and playwright. Versailles, Palace of Versailles and Grand Trianon.
- Louis Bourdaloue, Jesuit and preacher (mort en 1707). Versailles, Palace of Versailles and Grand Trianon.
- Antoine-Jean Amelot de Chaillou, Secretary of State from 1776 to 1783. Versailles, Palace of Versailles and Grand Trianon.
- Allegory with Louis XVI and the Constitution. Versailles, Palace of Versailles and Grand Trianon.
- Tribute to the beneficent views of the National Constituent Assembly and the loyalty of Louis XVI, circa 1791. Rothschild Collection, Paris, Louvre Museum.
- Le Bal paré. Rothschild Collection, Paris, Louvre Museum.
- C'est ici les différents jeux des petits Polissons de Paris: le sabot. Rothschild Collection, Paris, Louvre Museum.
- Benjamin Franklin (1706–1790), scholar and Minister Plenipotentiary of the United States of America to the Court of France. Blérancourt, National Museum of French-American Friendship and Cooperation.
