= Gabriel de Saint-Aubin =

French painter (1724–1780)

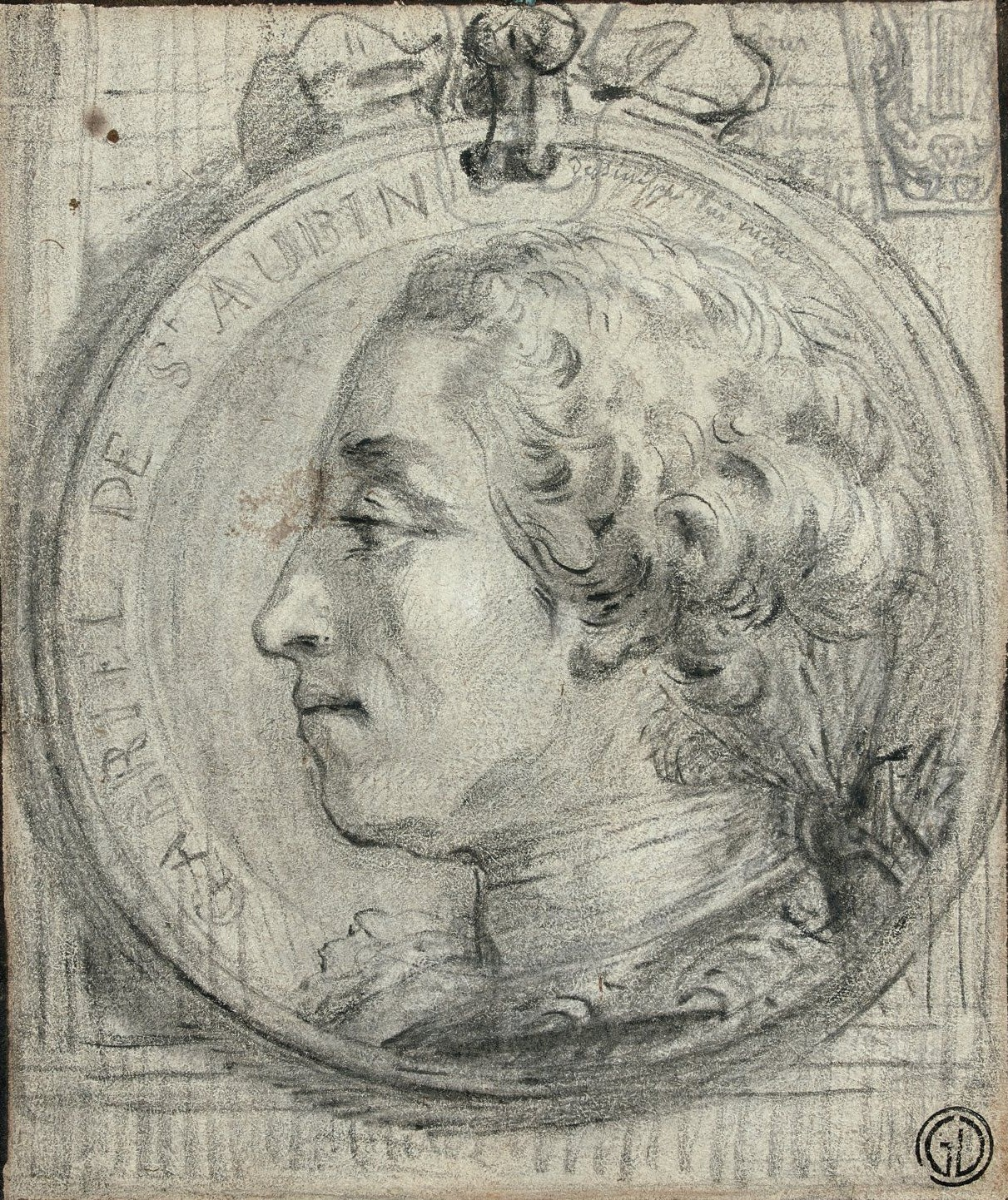
Gabriel de Saint-Aubin, "Self-portrait in a medallion"

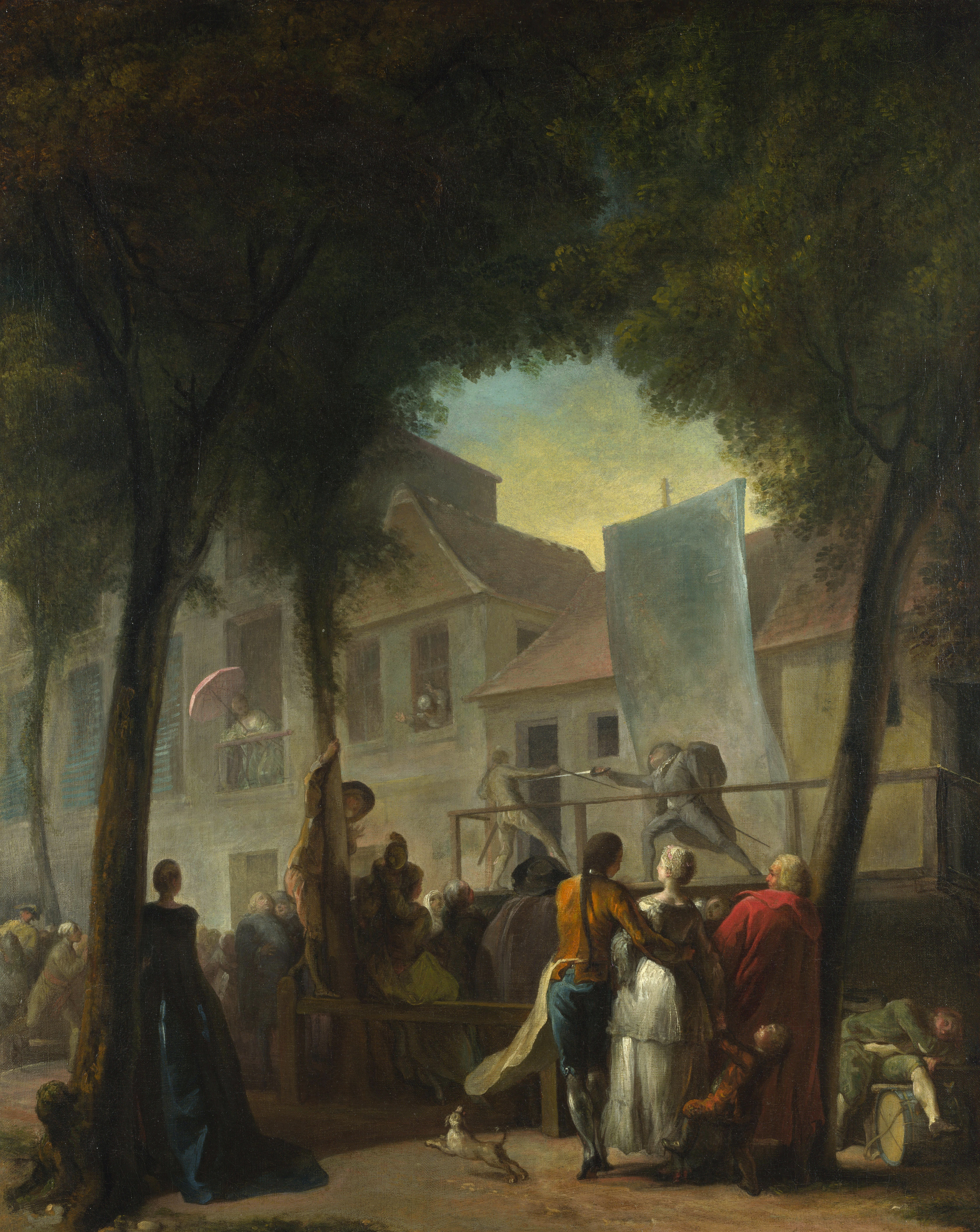
A Street Show in Paris by Gabriel de Saint-Aubin, National Gallery, 1760

Gabriel de Saint-Aubin (14 April 1724 – 14 February 1780) was a French draftsman, printmaker, etcher and painter.

== Biography ==
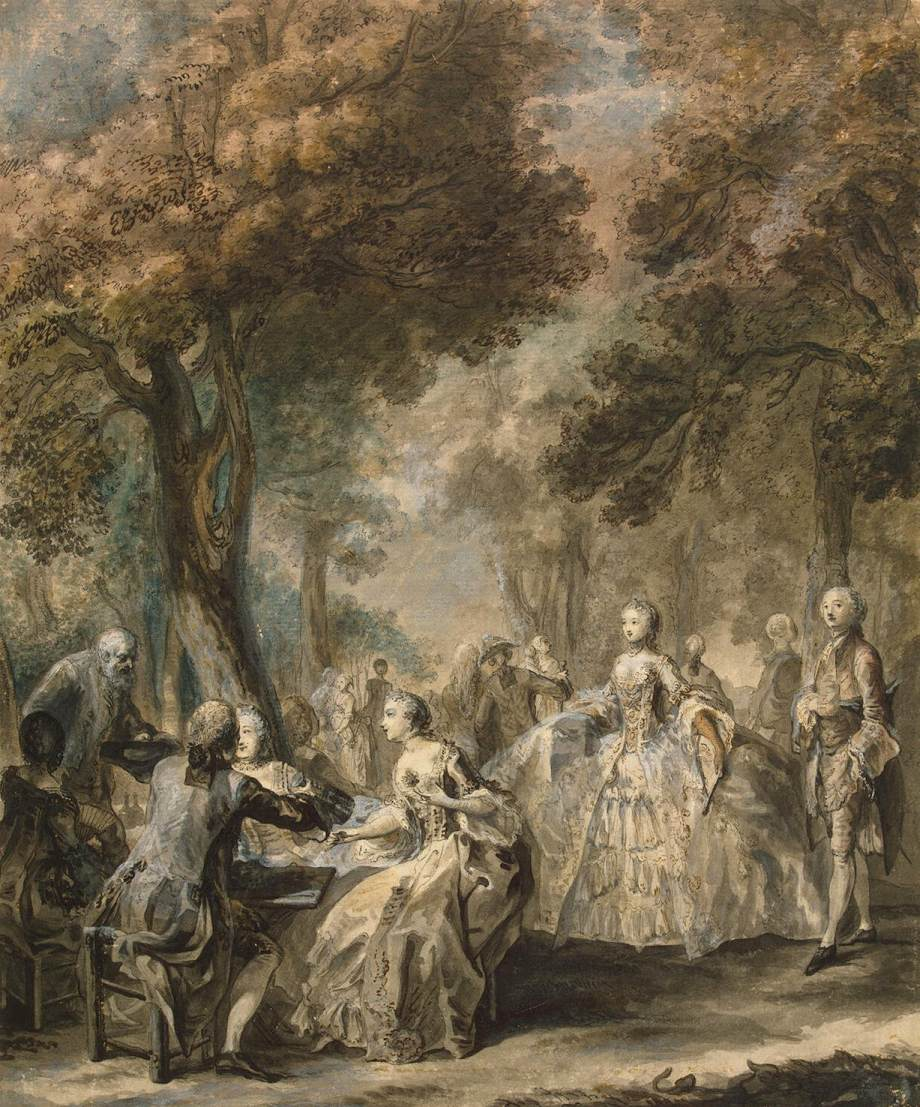
Society Taking a Promenade (c. 1760–61)

His brothers Charles Germain de Saint Aubin and Augustin de Saint-Aubin were also artists, as was his niece, Marie-Françoise, daughter of Charles. He was a student of Étienne Jeaurat and Hyacinthe Collin de Vermont. After three failures to win a Prix de Rome from 1752 to 1754, he left the Académie des Beaux-Arts and joined the Guild of Saint Luke.

A distinctive aspect of Saint-Aubin's art is its inordinate fondness for observation of society on the streets of the capital, which he sketched scenes or entertainment in his wanderings. As such, his engravings etchings and large watercolors are a valuable record of the Parisian artistic life in the eighteenth century. Gallery

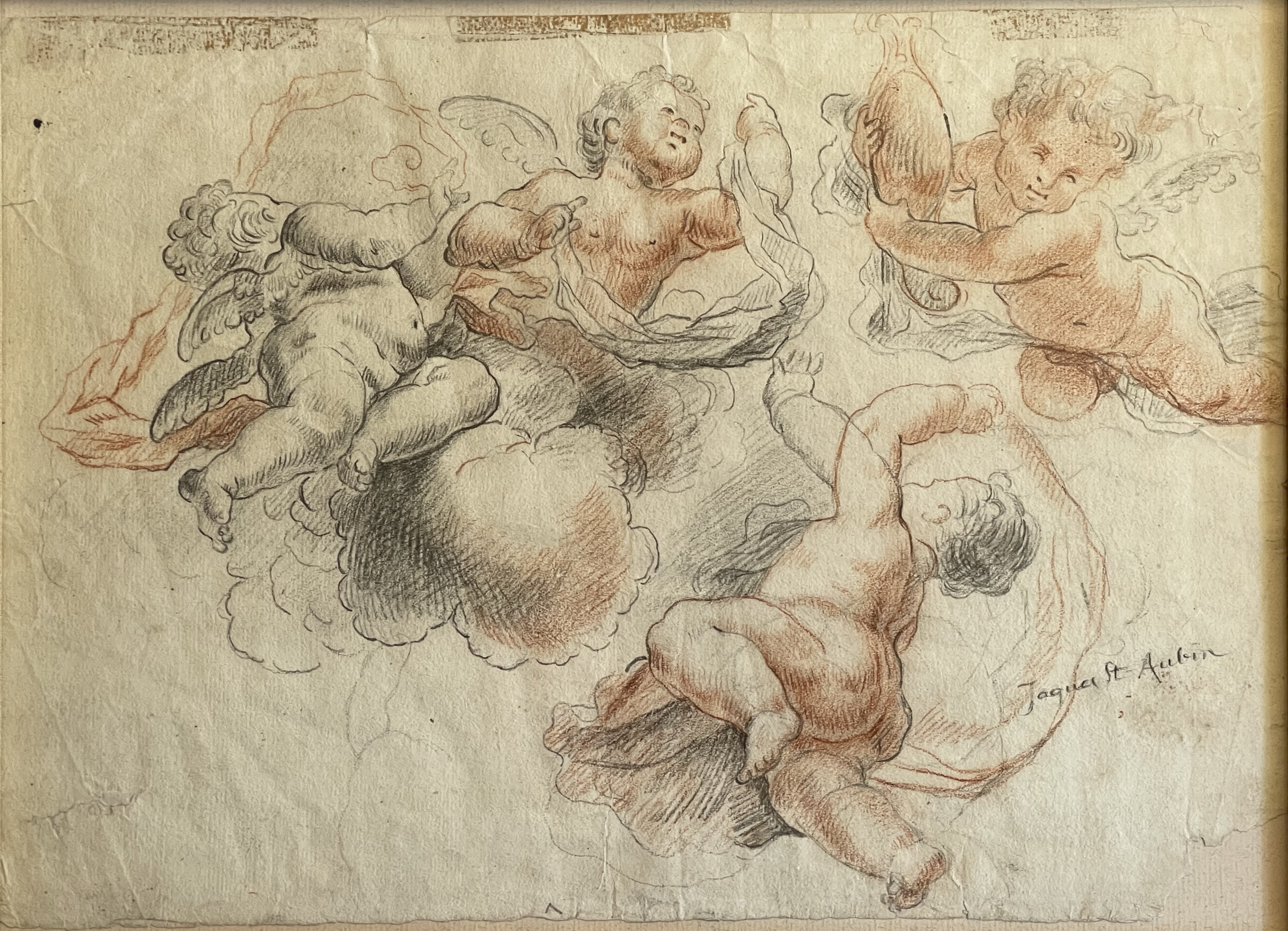
Baby Angels sketch perhaps for ceiling mural Saint-Aubin
