= Jean-Pierre de Bougainville =

French philologist (1722–1763)

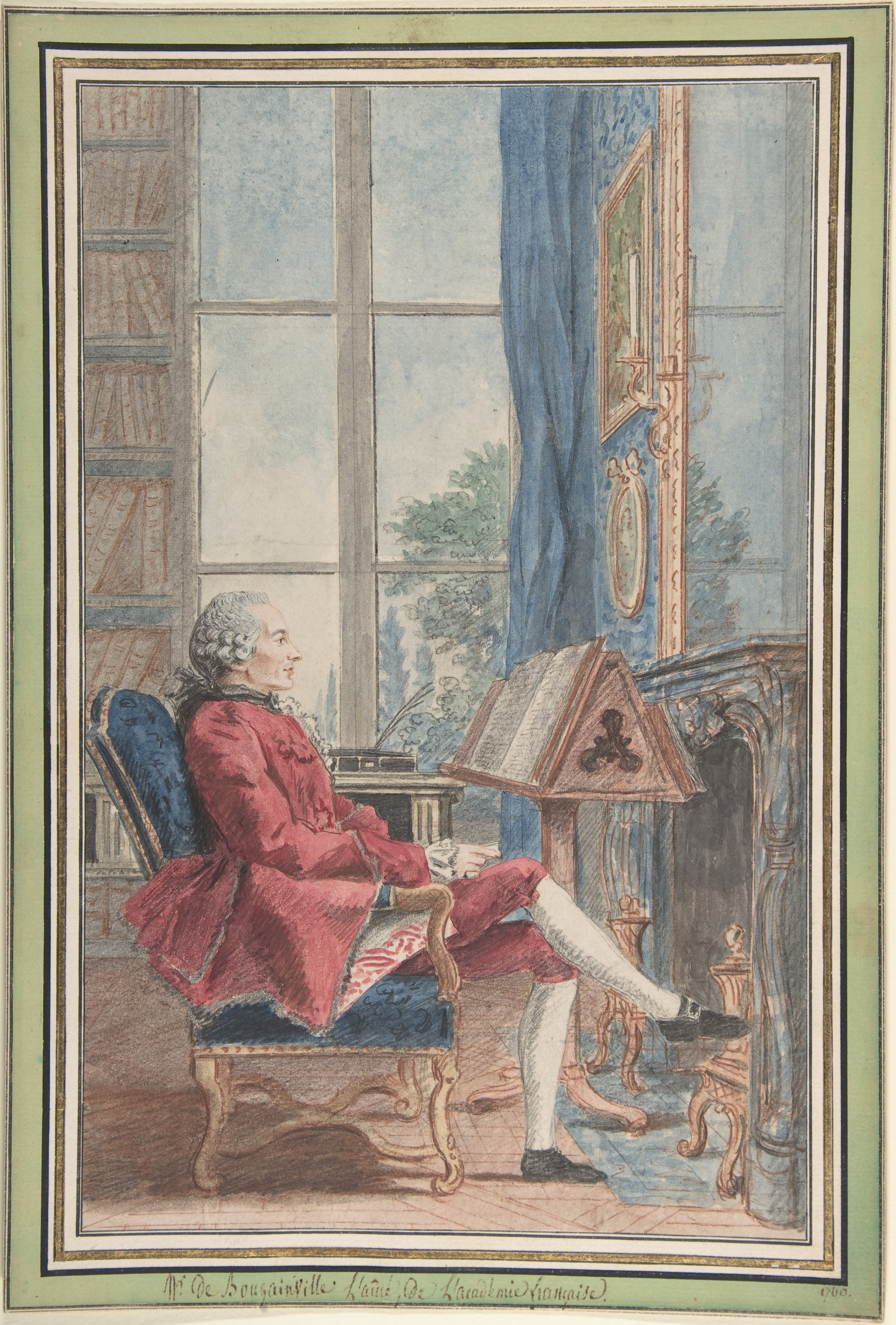
Jean-Pierre de Bougainville

Jean-Pierre de Bougainville (1 December 1722, in Paris – 22 June 1763, in Loches) was a French writer and the elder brother of the explorer Louis Antoine de Bougainville. He was elected to the Académie des Inscriptions et Belles-Lettres in 1746 and he became Permanent Secretary in 1754, the same year he rose to the Académie française.
