= Laran Bronze =

Fine art foundry in Chester, Pennsylvania

Laran Bronze is a fine art foundry in Chester, Pennsylvania. Founded in 1984 by Larry and Randy Welker in facilities built for the city's once-booming shipbuilding industry, the foundry has cast many monumental and significant sculptures, including many of the bronze components of the World War II Memorial in Washington, D.C. In 1985 or 1986, the foundry cast replicas of the hands of painter Andrew Wyeth; in 2019, one of these replicas sold at auction, along with a Wyeth painting, for $490,230.

The components cast at Laran for the WWII Memorial include four 18-foot columns, eight eagles with 10- to 12-foot wingspans, two 10-foot wreaths, and 24 plaques.

Other works cast at Laran Bronze include:

- Holodomor Memorial, Washington, D.C.
- Keys to Community, Philadelphia, Pennsylvania
- Gregor Mendel, Villanova University, Villanova, Pennsylvania
- The U.S. Air Force Honor Guard Memorial, Arlington, Virginia
- Brigadier-General John Gibbon statue, Gettysburg battlefield, Gettysburg, Pennsylvania
- Sculptures on the Square, Charlotte, North Carolina
- Gem of the Lakes, 311 S. Wacker Drive, Chicago, Illinois

== Works ==
Title	Image	Artist	Year	Location	Coordinates	Material	Dimensions	Owner
George A. Romero '78	The memorial bust of filmmaker George A. Romero at Monroeville Mall near Pittsburgh, PA. Sculpted by artist Christian Stavrakis in 2018.	Christian Stavrakis	2018	Monroeville, Pennsylvania	40.429531°N 79.797315°W	Bronze	2 feet (0.61 m) high, 1.5 feet (0.46 m) wide, 1 foot (0.30 m) depth	
American Pharoah		James Peniston	2017	Hot Springs, Arkansas	34.48359246636598°N 93.05943790609463°W	Bronze	10 feet (3.0 m)	Oaklawn Racing Casino Resort
Freedom		Zenos Frudakis	2000	Philadelphia, Pennsylvania	39.958056°N 75.166389°W	Bronze	20 ft (6.1 m) wide, 8 ft (2.4 m) high	
