= Statue of Frank Rizzo =

Statue formerly installed in Philadelphia

- Frank L. Rizzo Monument
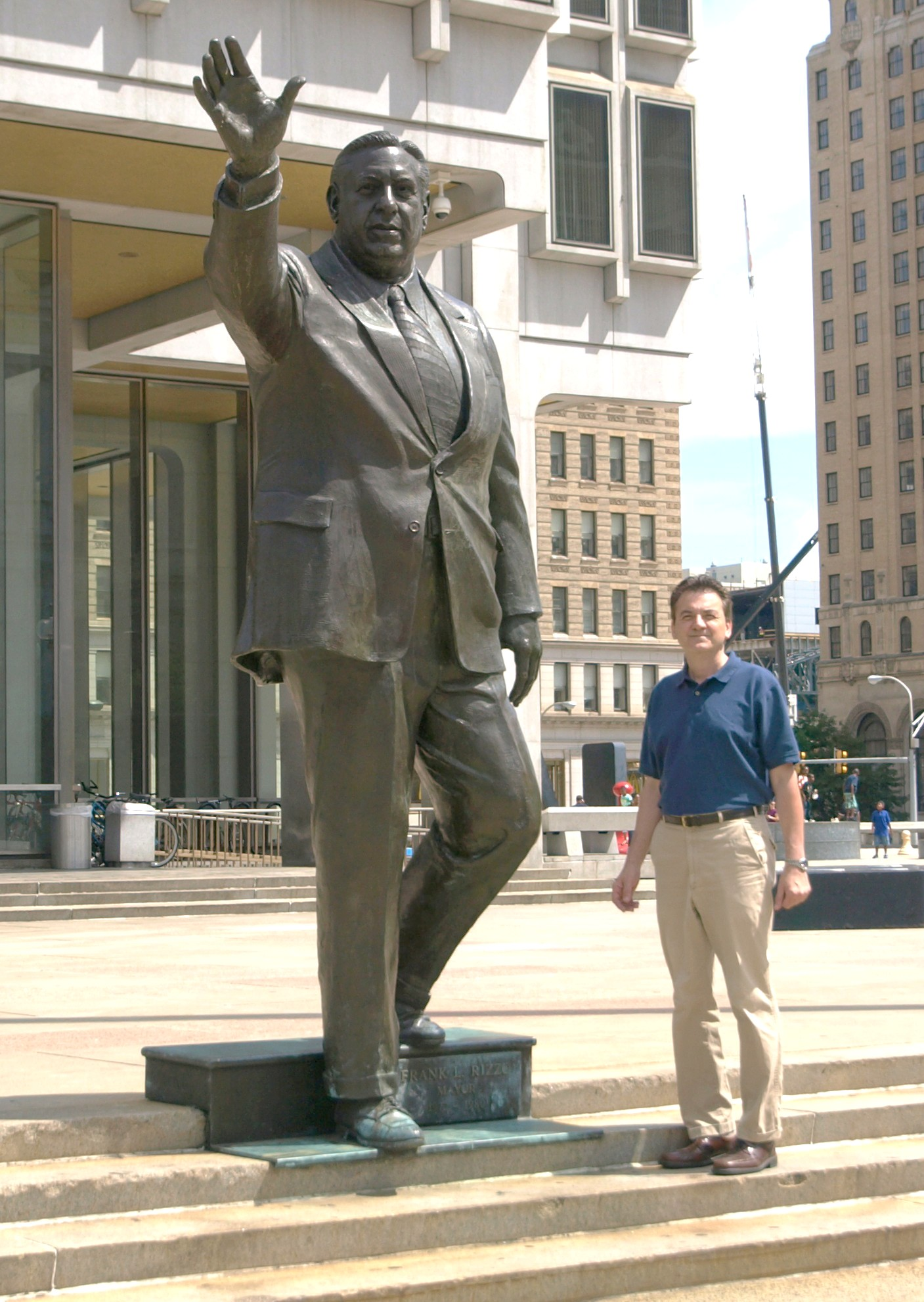
- Artist Zenos Frudakis with the statue, 2009
- Year: 1998
- Medium: Bronze sculpture
- Subject: Frank Rizzo
- Dimensions: 3.0 m (10 ft)
- Condition: Removed 2020, now in storage
- Location: Philadelphia, Pennsylvania, U.S.; 39°57′14″N 75°09′52″W

A statue of Frank Rizzo, sometimes called the Frank L. Rizzo Monument, was installed in Philadelphia, in the U.S. state of Pennsylvania. Erected in 1998, the bronze sculpture was removed in June 2020. Black Lives Matter activists and others protested the statue's presence, and the statue was taken down during the George Floyd protests.

== Background ==
As mayor, Rizzo was a strong opponent of desegregation of Philadelphia's schools, and prevented the construction of public housing in majority-white neighborhoods. While running for a third term, Rizzo urged supporters to "Vote White". During his tenure as police commissioner and mayor, the Philadelphia police department engaged in patterns of police brutality, intimidation, coercion, and disregard for constitutional rights. The patterns of police brutality were documented in a Pulitzer-Prize winning Philadelphia Inquirer series by William K. Marimow and Jon Neuman.

== History ==
The statue was placed on its pedestal on December 30, 1998 and unveiled on January 1, 1999. A crowd of 150 listened to speeches by Mayor Ed Rendell. The Philadelphia Inquirer reported that sculptor Zenos Frudakis had "decided that his monument should be a statue walking toward the people, hand upheld in a greeting."

=== Controversy and removal ===
In 2013, following the not-guilty verdict in the killing of Trayvon Martin, a sign was hung around the statue's neck with the message, "This system is still racist." The Philadelphia Inquirer noted that Rizzo "had a poor relationship with Philadelphia's African-American community."

Calls for the statue's removal began in 2016, when a group called the Philly Coalition for REAL Justice started an online petition. In August 2017, following the Unite the Right rally in Charlottesville, Virginia, the statue was vandalized, kicking off further calls for its removal. Frudakis told the Tribune that he "hesitated to do the work at first" due to Rizzo's past and would accept the statue's removal if the city decided on it.

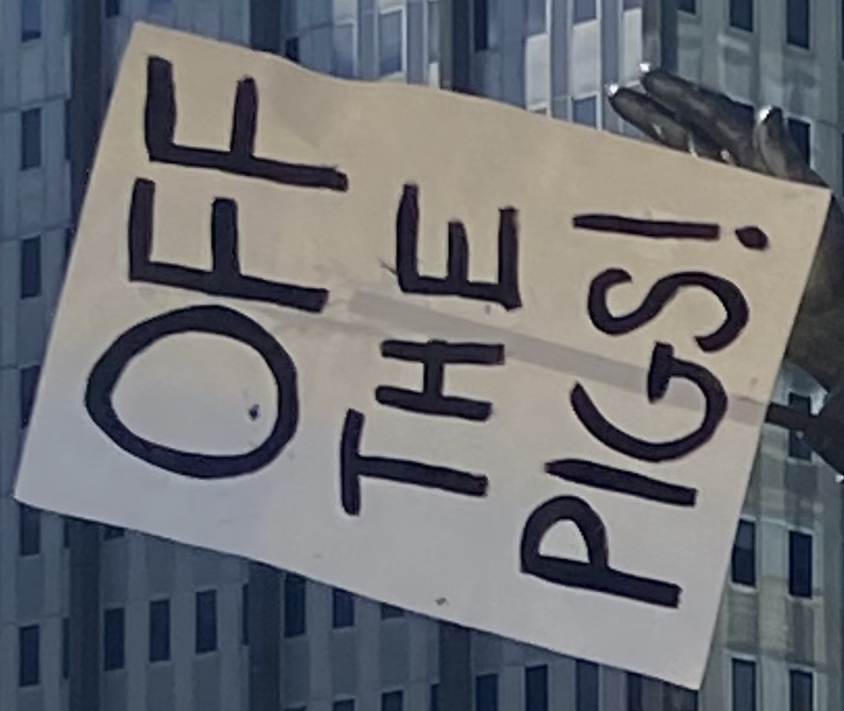
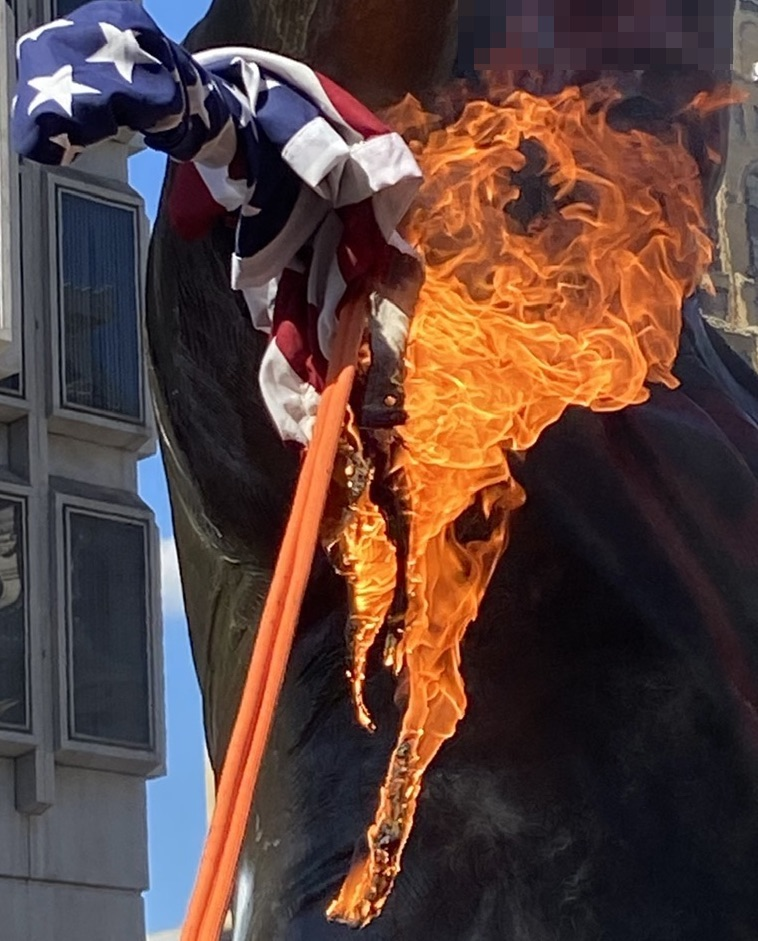
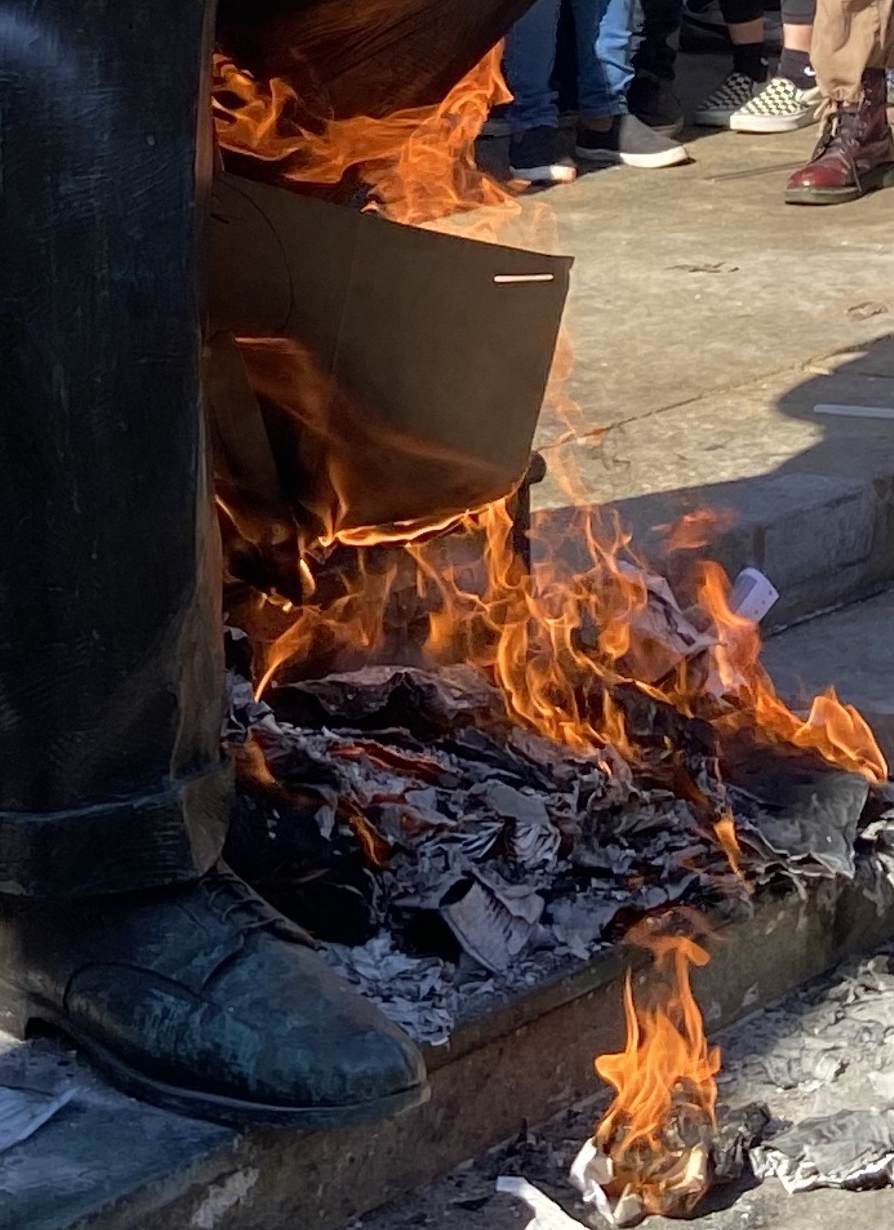
The statue became a target of activists during the George Floyd protests in Philadelphia. It was removed by the city shortly afterwards.

In November 2017, the city voted to remove the statue, but mayor Jim Kenney refused due to the $200,000 expense involved. Following unsuccessful attempts to pull down the statue during the 2020 George Floyd protests, the mayor's office ordered its removal. The statue was placed into storage in July of that year.

== See also ==
- List of monument and memorial controversies in the United States
- List of monuments and memorials removed during the George Floyd protests
- The Thin Blue Lie, a television film about police torture in Philadelphia under the mayorship of Frank Rizzo
