= Statue of Ellis Arnall =

Public monument in Atlanta, Georgia, US

Coordinates: 33°44′57″N 84°23′19″W

Ellis Arnall statue
- Location: Georgia State Capitol, Atlanta, Georgia
- Designer: Zenos Frudakis
- Dedicated date: November 24, 1997
- Dedicated to: Ellis Arnall

The Ellis Arnall statue is a public monument located on the grounds of the Georgia State Capitol in Atlanta, Georgia. Honoring Georgia Governor Ellis Arnall, the statue was sculpted by Zenos Frudakis and unveiled in 1997.

== History ==
Ellis Arnall served as Governor of Georgia from 1943 to 1947 who is best known for his progressive policies such as ending the poll tax in Georgia and lowering the voting age in the state to 18. Arnall died in 1992 at the age of 85. Following his death, his law firm pushed for a statue honoring the late governor to be erected on the Capitol grounds, which happened several years later in 1997. The unveiling took place on November 24 of that year, with then-governor Zell Miller speaking at the ceremony. The statue was designed by sculptor Zenos Frudakis and faces towards the nearby Central Presbyterian Church. It is among several statues near the state capitol honoring former governors and other prominent Georgians.

== See also ==
- 1997 in art
