= Reaching (sculpture) =

Sculpture by Zenos Frudakis

- Artist: Zenos Frudakis
- Year: 1987
- Type: bronze
- Location: Indianapolis; 39°46′15″N 86°9′34″W

Reaching is a public artwork by artist Zenos Frudakis, located in downtown Indianapolis, Indiana, United States. It is a figurative bronze portrait of a nude male and female. Each figure is leaping and reaching, arms outstretched toward the other.

== See also ==
- List of public art in Indianapolis
