= Zenos Frudakis =

American sculptor (born 1951)

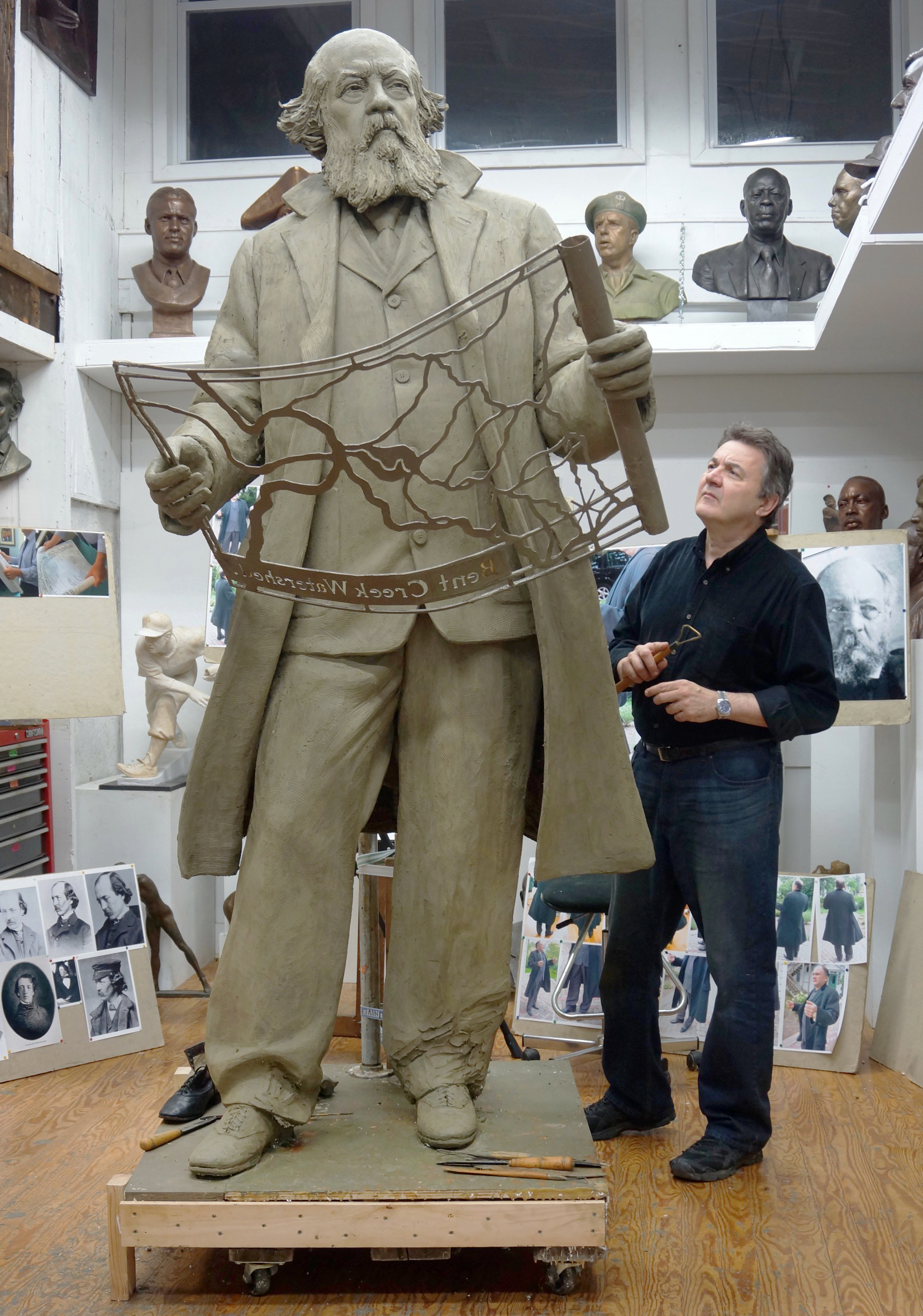
- Zenos Frudakis working on his sculpture of Frederick Law Olmsted.
- Born: July 7, 1951 (age 75); San Francisco, California, U.S.
- Education: Pennsylvania Academy of the Fine Arts; University of Pennsylvania
- Known for: Sculpture
- Notable work: Freedom, United States Air Force Memorial Honor Guard, Knowledge is Power, Payne Stewart at Pinehurst Golf Course

Zenos Frudakis (born July 7, 1951) is an American sculptor whose diverse body of work includes monuments, memorials, portrait busts and statues of living and historic individuals, military subjects, sports figures and animal sculpture. Over the past four decades he has sculpted monumental works and over 150 figurative sculptures included within public and private collections throughout the United States and internationally. Frudakis currently lives and works near Philadelphia, and is best known for his sculpture Freedom, which shows a series of figures breaking free from a wall and is installed in downtown Philadelphia. Other notable works are at Arlington National Cemetery in Virginia, Brookgreen Gardens in South Carolina, the National Academy of Design, and the Lotos Club of New York City, the Imperial War Museum in England, the Utsukushi ga-hara Open Air Museum in Japan, and the U.S. Embassy in Pretoria, South Africa.

== Biography ==
Born on July 7, 1951, in San Francisco, Frudakis is the oldest of five children. He was born to Greek-American parents, and was raised primarily in Northwest Indiana, with the exception of several years in Wheeling, West Virginia. As a child, Frudakis first began to sculpt under the family's kitchen table with a piece of dough given to him by his mother as she was preparing to bake bread. Growing up in Greek family culture, Frudakis began drawing and reading at a young age, initiating a lifelong discipline of studying and creating art each day. Artistic inspirations come from ancient Greeks, and sculptors Michelangelo, Gian Lorenzo Bernini, Jean-Baptiste Carpeaux and Auguste Rodin.

Frudakis' initial years in college were close to home in the Gary, Indiana area due to illness of his father. During this time, he spent summers working in steel mills, and in 1970 to 1971, attended Indiana University Northwest Extension.

In 1972, Frudakis moved to Philadelphia to study at the Pennsylvania Academy of the Fine Arts. Concurrently, he also studied sculpture privately with Prix de Rome winner Evangelos Frudakis, his elder brother. Frudakis studied painting privately with Prix de Rome winner James Hanes. From 1977 to 1983, he attended the University of Pennsylvania, where Frudakis earned bachelor's and master's degrees in Fine Arts.

== Career ==
=== Early work ===
In 1976, Frudakis married Rosalie Gluchoff. Together they began a gallery and ran Frudakis Studio, located in center city Philadelphia. Frudakis' first important commission was a portrait sculpture of Samuel L. Evans, founder of the American Foundation for Negro Affairs (AFNA); followed by portrait sculptures of Wilson Goode, former mayor of Philadelphia, Pennsylvania; The Honorable K. Leroy Irvis, the first African American to serve as a State Legislature's Speaker of the House; and Joseph E. Coleman, former City Council President, Philadelphia, Pennsylvania.

=== Figure and portrait sculpture ===
Frudakis continued sculpting commissions with an emphasis on the figure and the portrait, as demonstrated in his many monumental works, individual portrait statues and busts, and bas-reliefs. He created sculptures of living and historic individuals that express the character and vitality of his subjects while capturing an accurate likeness. Portrait statues included notable figures, such as businessman and philanthropist John D. MacArthur, installed in Palm Beach Gardens, Florida; Honorable Dame Lois Browne-Evans, the first female Bermudian justice, installed in the Dame Lois Browne Evans Building, Hamilton, Bermuda; landscape architect, journalist and public administrator Frederick Law Olmsted, installed at The North Carolina Arboretum, Asheville, North Carolina; and lawyer Clarence Darrow on view at the Rhea County Courthouse in Dayton, Tennessee.

=== Dr. Martin Luther King Jr. ===
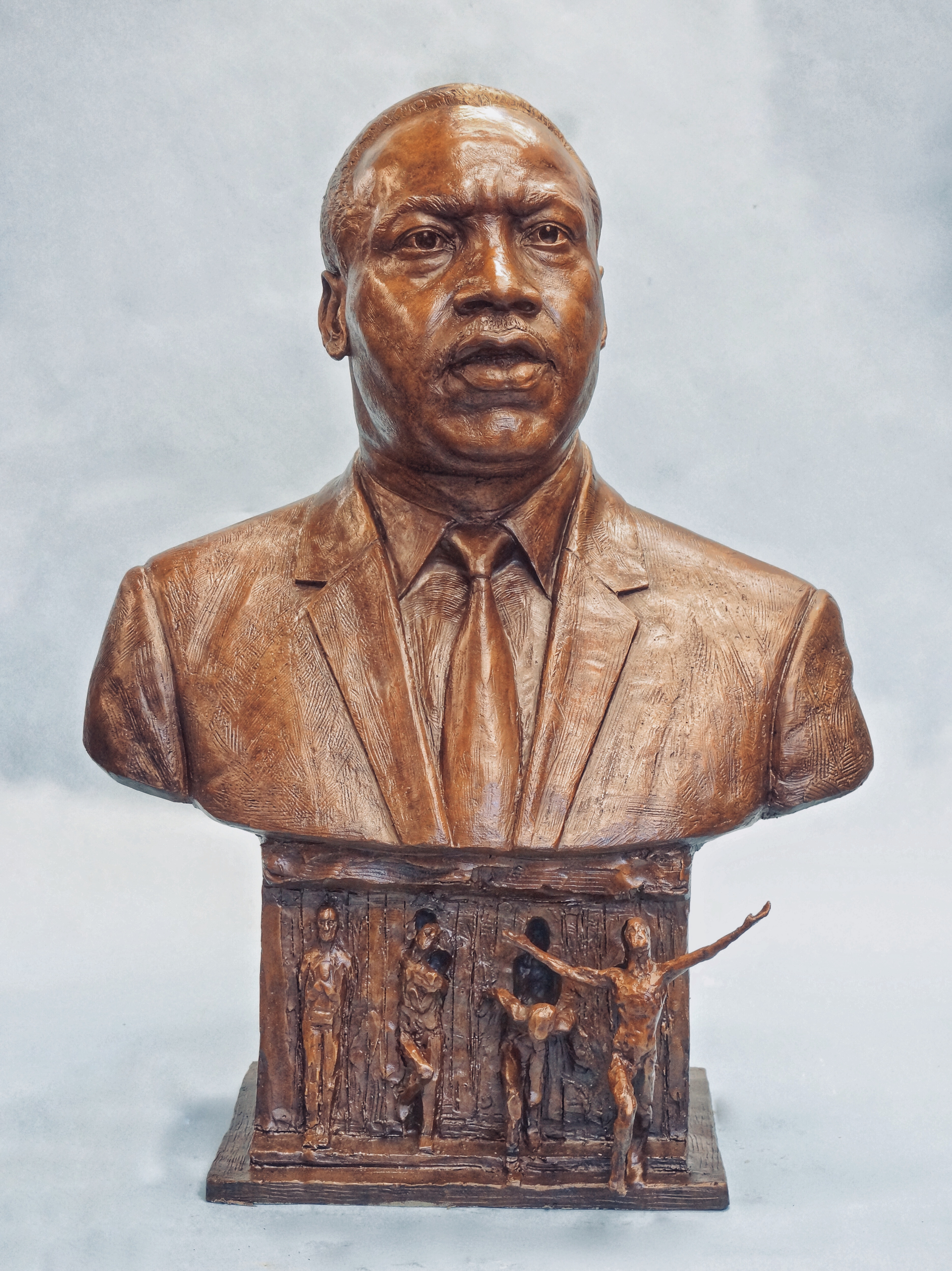
Martin Luther King Jr. and Freedom Sculpture

Some of Frudakis's sculptures have generated controversy. When he sculpted a life-size bronze bust of Dr. Martin Luther King Jr. for the U.S. Embassy in Pretoria, South Africa, apartheid was still in effect there. The U.S. government had advised Frudakis he could be jailed for bringing the sculpture into South Africa, so the bust was brought into the country in 1989 by diplomatic pouch. The sculpture was installed just inside the embassy's fence, visible to the public but outside the South African government's reach, standing as a statement of the U.S.’s opposition to apartheid.

=== Clarence Darrow ===
Frudakis' statue of attorney Clarence Darrow reawakened tensions between local evolutionists and creationists when it was installed outside the Rhea County Courthouse in Dayton, Tennessee, in 2017. The courthouse was the site of the 1925 Scopes "monkey trial," in which John T. Scopes was accused of unlawful teaching of human evolution in a state-funded school. Darrow represented Scopes, while William Jennings Bryan argued for the prosecution. Since 2005, a sculpture of Bryan has been on display on the courthouse lawn. The Darrow sculpture was commissioned by the Freedom From Religion Foundation and installed on the lawn in balance to the Bryan sculpture, where it drew criticism from some residents who oppose to the teaching of evolution in Tennessee schools.

== Sports sculpture ==
Frudakis has been commissioned to create bronze portrait busts, statues, and monuments of significant figures from the sports world, including golf, baseball, hockey and boxing.

=== Payne Stewart, Pinehurst ===
A celebratory pose of golfer Payne Stewart, with a leg in the air and a fist thrust to the sky, is commemorated in Frudakis' bronze statue displayed at Pinehurst Resort, North Carolina, near the spot where Stewart, in 1999, made this gesture upon winning the U.S. Open. The sculpture was unveiled at Pinehurst in 2001. In 2014, when Pinehurst once again hosted the U.S. Open, on the 15th anniversary of Stewart's win, attendees posed alongside the sculpture, mimicking the iconic pose. Thousands of television and online viewers saw these images; Payne's daughter Chelsea was photographed with her father's sculpture and the PGA Tour called it on Instagram, "The coolest statue photo you’ll see this week." Payne Stewart's tribute trophy case at Pinehurst Resort also showcases Frudakis' portrait bust of Payne Stewart along with historic photos and memorabilia.

=== Other golfers ===
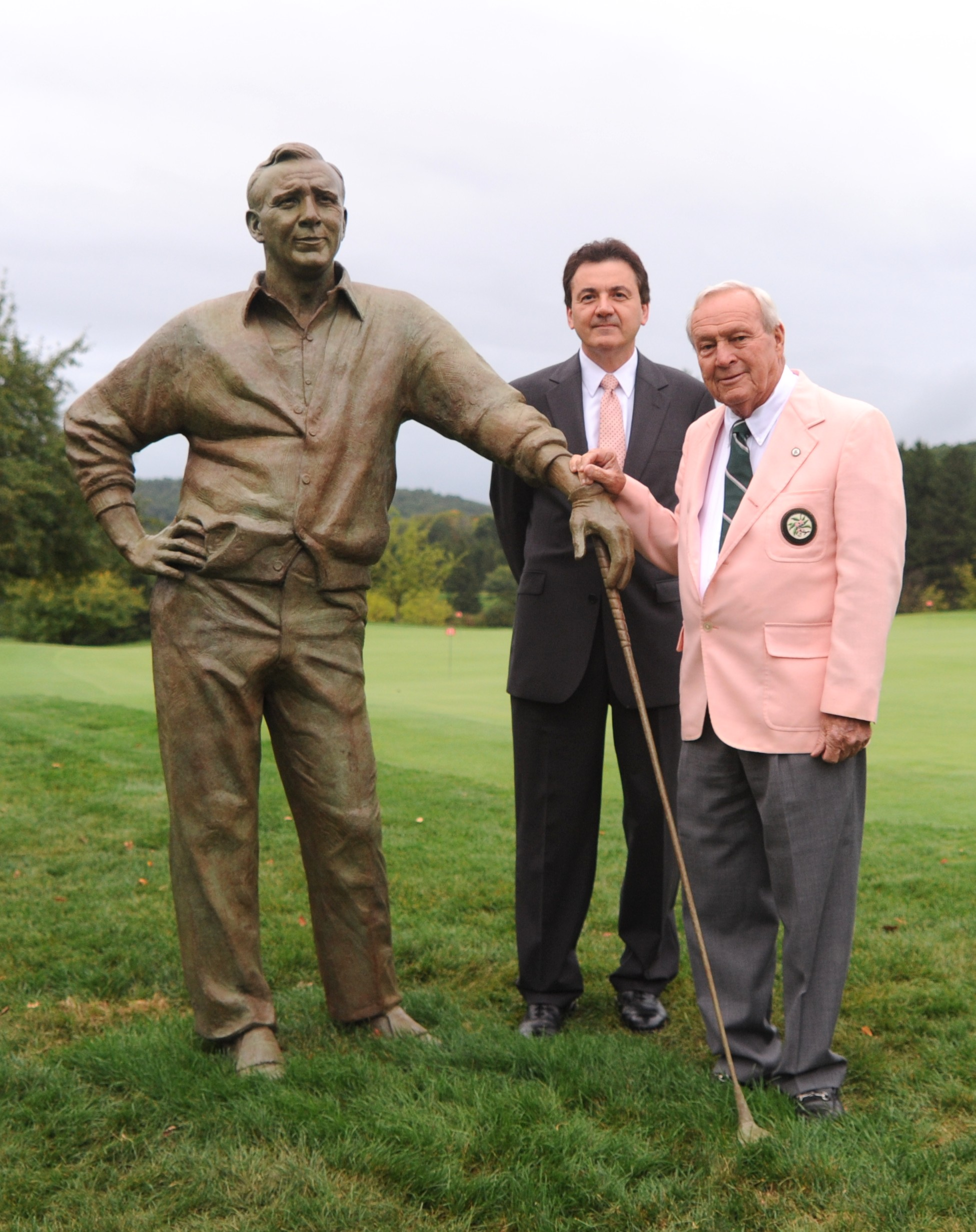
Arnold Palmer with portrait statue (2009).

Sculptures of other prominent golfers include Arnold Palmer at Georgia Golf Hall of Fame in Augusta, and the Arnold Palmer Airport, Latrobe, Pennsylvania and the Arnold Palmer at Tralee, Ireland; Jack Nicklaus at the USGA Museum, Far Hills, New Jersey, and at Valhalla, Lexington, Kentucky; Dinah Shore at the Wall of Champions, Rancho Mirage, California; Bob Jones at East Lake Golf Club, Atlanta, Georgia, and U.S. Golf Association Museum, Liberty Corner, New Jersey; and Robert H. Dedman, Sr. and Richard Tufts at Pinehurst Resort, Pinehurst, North Carolina. Golf Digest commissioned Frudakis to create the bronze trophy sculpture known as The Arnie, a philanthropy award for "golfers who give back."

=== Baseball Hall of Famers ===
Frudakis’ larger-than-life sculptures include Baseball Hall of Famers Mike Schmidt, Steve Carlton, Richie Ashburn and Robin Roberts, all on view at Citizens Bank Park, Philadelphia. A relief sculpture of Coach Staffieri is at University of Pennsylvania's Franklin Field. A public monument at the DiMaggio Children's Hospital, Hollywood, Florida, shows Joe DiMaggio kneeling to speak to a young boy, and includes the inscription, "We never stand so tall as when we stoop to help a child."

=== Boxer James J. Braddock ===
World champion boxer James J. Braddock (known as "the Cinderella Man") is commemorated in a 10-foot (3.0 m), 1,500-pound (680 kg) bronze statue at James J. Braddock North Hudson Park, North Bergen, New Jersey, near where the boxer lived and trained. The sculpture was unveiled on September 27, 2018, attended by a large crowd including local and county officials, Braddock's family, fans and other notable boxers Gerry Cooney, Pat Murphy, Randy Neumann, and the legendary "Bayonne Bleeder," Chuck Wepner.

Jimmy Braddock, grandson of James, said, "This statue is a reminder of the power of the human spirit to overcome adversity through determination."

=== Hockey All-Star Brian Phillip Propp ===
A portrait bust of National Hockey League All-Star Brian Phillip Propp is displayed at the Philadelphia Flyers Hall of Fame.

== Major works ==
Frudakis has sculpted a wide range of subject matter in bronze, stainless steel and clay, including monuments, memorial, portrait busts, statues, military, sports, animals, people and historic figures. The sculptures range in size and technique from relief panels to monuments. His best-known and most acclaimed works include Freedom, the United States Air Force Memorial Honor Guard, Payne Stewart, John D. McArthur, Clarence Darrow, Frederick Law Olmsted, James Braddock and Nina Simone.

=== Frank Rizzo ===
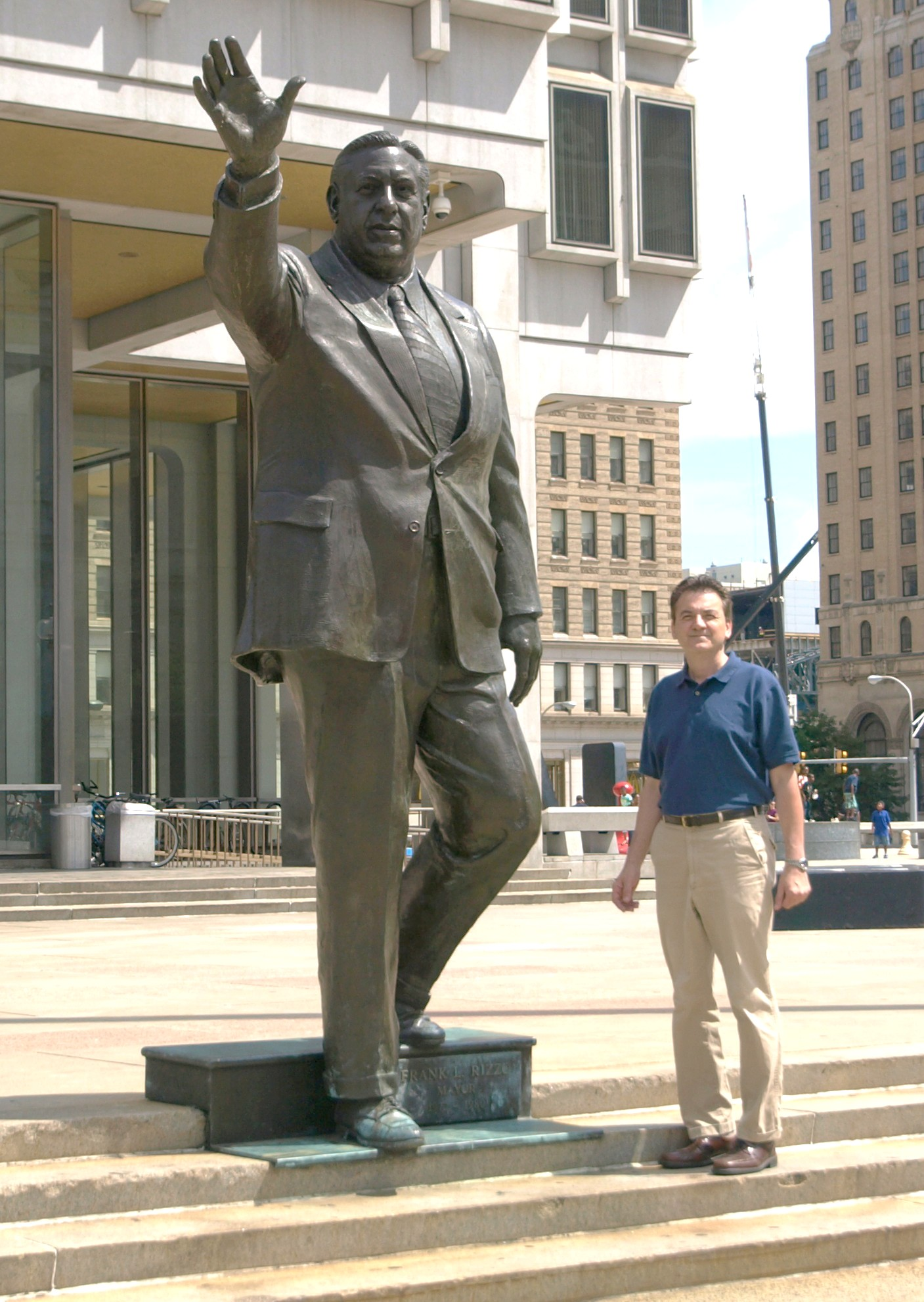
Frudakis's statue of Philadelphia mayor and police commissioner Frank Rizzo; unveiled 1999 and taken down in 2020

One of Frudakis's first commissions was a statue of Philadelphia mayor and police commissioner Frank Rizzo, unveiled in 1999. The statue was controversial due to Rizzo's opposition to desegregation and use of police brutality. It was removed in 2020 following the George Floyd protests.

=== John D. McArthur ===
The 8-foot (2.4 m) bronze statue honoring Palm Beach Gardens’ city founder John D. MacArthur is mounted on a 3-foot (0.91 m) base of granite from a quarry in Vermont. Unveiled on November 21, 2010, as part of the city's 50th anniversary celebration, the sculpture is installed at the city hall entrance on Military Trail.

=== Frederick Law Olmsted ===
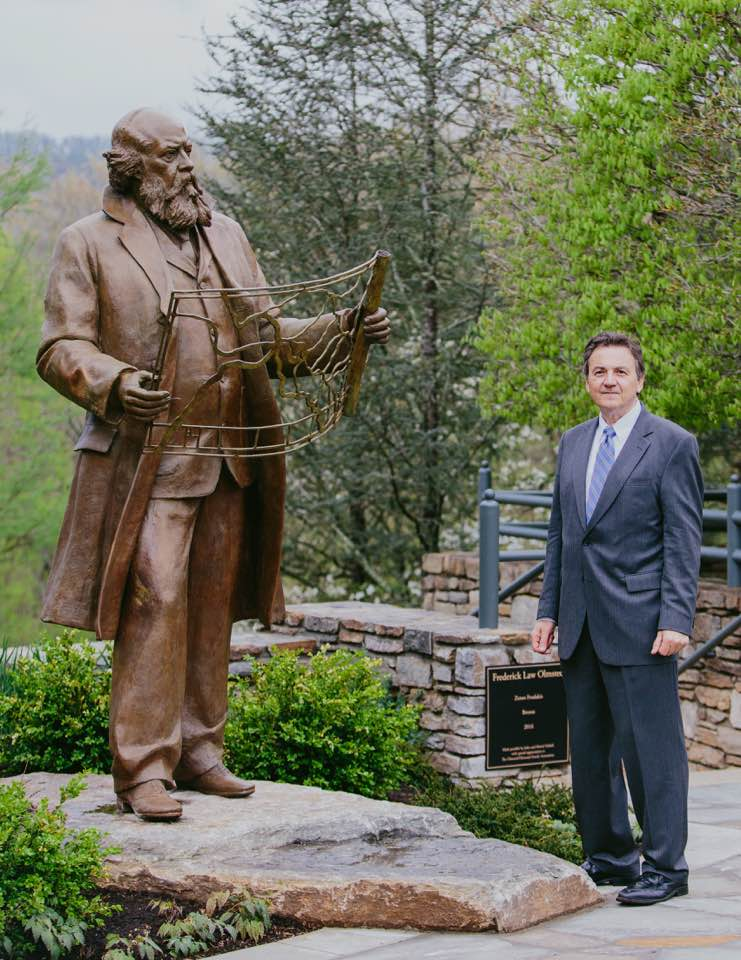
Frederick Law Olmsted sculpture by Zenos Frudakis.

Commissioned by The North Carolina Arboretum, the first larger-than-life-size sculpture of Frederick Law Olmsted is a tribute to the man known as the father of American landscape architecture. It was unveiled at a ceremony on April 22, 2016, at the Arboretum in Asheville, North Carolina. The Olmsted sculpture is sited on a large natural stone in the Arboretum's Blue Ridge Court with a view of the Pisgah National Forest behind it. Frudakis said, "It was important for me to create a sculpture that embodied the idea of Frederick Law Olmsted as a visionary of monumental proportions. In his hands he holds the abstract topographic map, which came from his mind and became the land that he stood on."

=== Nina Simone ===
The memorial sculpture of Nina Simone depicts the "High Priestess of Soul" seated atop a stone base while performing on a floating keyboard. The keyboard is sculpted in the form of a wave—evoking the sense of grace, rhythm and music. Simone's daughter, Broadway actress Lisa Simone Kelly posed for Frudakis as he sculpted the 8-foot (2.4 m) bronze portrait statue. The memorial of the world-renowned singer and human rights activist includes her ashes within a sculpted heart that is welded to the interior of the figure's chest.

The Nina Simone sculpture was dedicated on February 21, 2010, which would have been Simone's 77th birthday. The memorial is in Nina Simone Plaza in her birthplace of Tryon, North Carolina.

=== Molly Maguires ===
The larger-than-life Molly Maguires Memorial depicts the defining moment in the group's history, The Day of the Rope (June 21, 1877), during which ten victims of the Molly era lost their lives. All were represented by a single hooded figure on a scaffold the moment before hanging. The emotional impact of the sculpture provokes a reconsideration of history. A cast of this sculpture is in the collection of the State Museum of Pennsylvania, Harrisburg, Pennsylvania.

=== Monuments ===
Frudakis’ first public monument is The Water Hole, a life-size sculpture of an elephant playfully spraying water on a boy sitting on the elephant's back. It was commissioned by department store owner Stockton Strawbridge for the Burlington Center Mall in Burlington, New Jersey. His subsequent public monuments include the sculptures Path to Manhood in Dallas; Dr. Martin Luther King Jr. Monument in Chester, Pennsylvania; Knowledge is Power at Rowan University, Glassboro, New Jersey; the United States Air Force National Memorial Honor Guard in Arlington, Virginia; and Freedom in Philadelphia.

=== Knowledge is Power ===
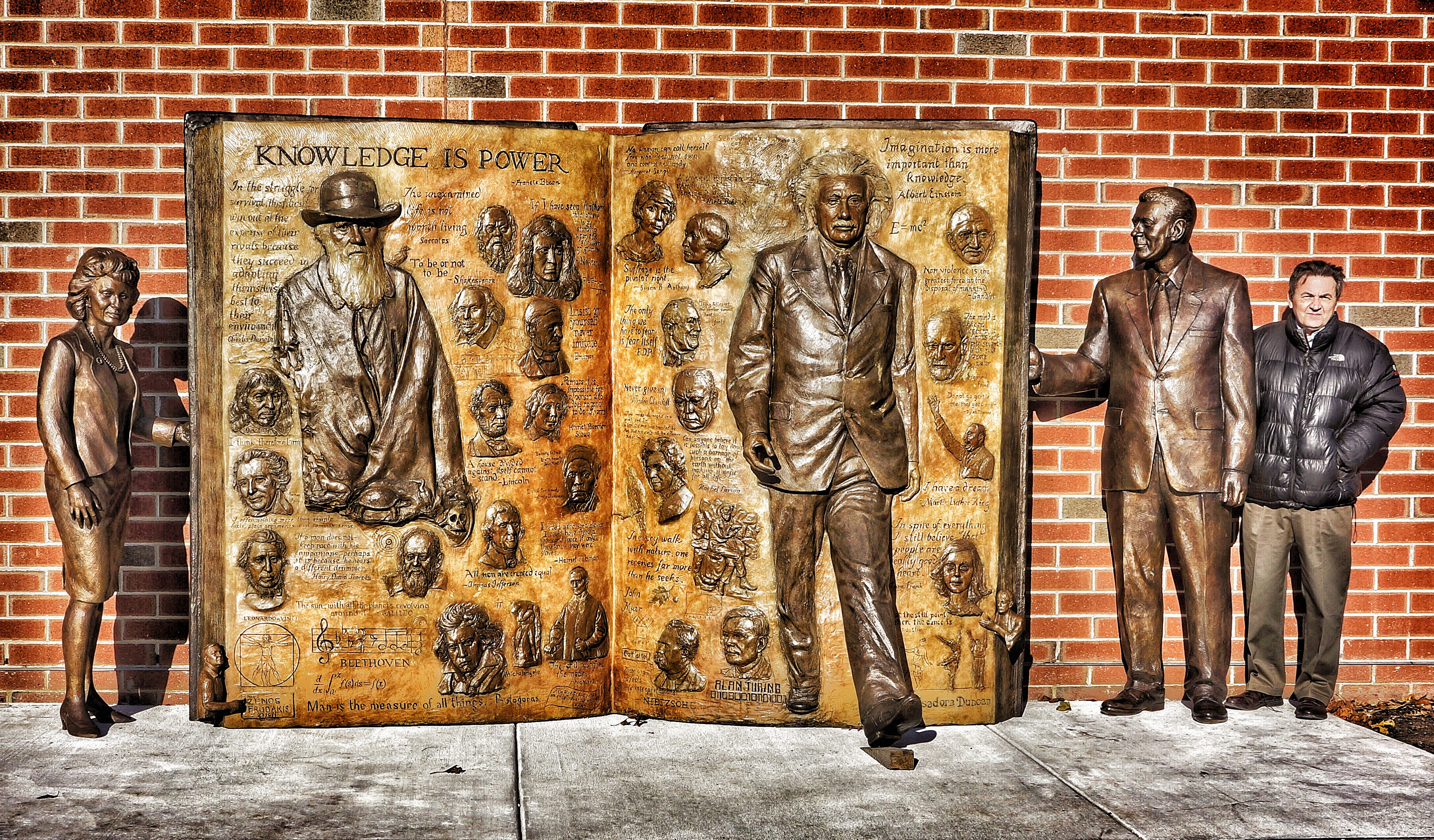
Knowledge is Power sculpture by Zenos Frudakis.

Using Francis Bacon's quote, "Knowledge is Power" as the central theme, Frudakis sculpted this monument to inspire the process and pleasure of learning. Using the visual metaphor of an open book, the 8-ft high by 12-ft wide sculpture features Charles Darwin and Albert Einstein emerging from its pages. These influential figures represent key shifts in the understanding of the world and its sciences. Relief faces and quotes from 31 iconic figures in science, history, mathematics and the arts portray contrasting theories, philosophies and politics, as well as struggles shared across generations. On the left page, a large relief portrait of Charles Darwin is encircled by early thinkers, artists, activists, politicians and scientists along with their famous ideas or works. On the right page, Albert Einstein steps out dimensionally as did his ideas about space and time, and he is surrounded by more contemporary figures, concepts and quotations. The viewer is led through a process of exploration and is left to weigh countering viewpoints and discover their personal resonance.

Installed in 2014, the sculpture is located at the entrance to James Hall at Rowan University in Glassboro, New Jersey.

=== United States Air Force Memorial Honor Guard ===
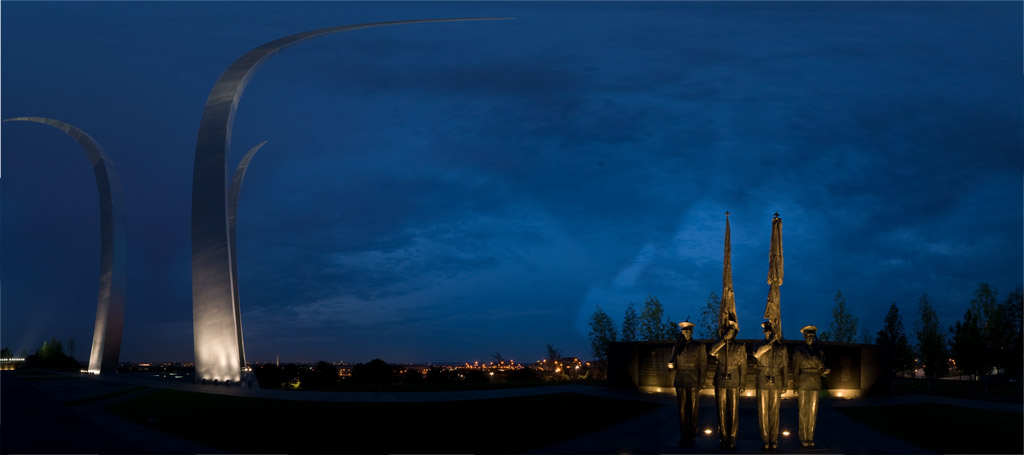
United States Air Force Memorial as seen at night.

The United States Air Force Memorial Honor Guard, a 16-foot (4.9 m) high monument, consists of four 8-foot (2.4 m) bronze figures, patinaed in blue-gray, standing side by side and mounted on a 10-foot (3.0 m) bronze base. The two middle figures are flag bearers, carrying the United States and Air Force flags and battle streamers, flanked by two rifle guards. The Honor Guard soldiers depicted in the Air Force Memorial are, from left to right, a Caucasian man, an African American man, a Latino man and a Caucasian woman. The sculpture stands before the granite inscription wall bearing the names of U.S. Air Force recipients of the Medal of Honor. The facing south wall is inscribed with Air Force core-value quotations: "Integrity first, service before self, and excellence in all we do." The monument stands adjacent to the memorial's three stainless-steel spires created by James Ingo Freed that soar above the statues. The memorial is located near The Pentagon and Arlington National Cemetery in Arlington, Virginia.

The design of the sculpture was initially more sketch-like but as it progressed became more detailed with precise measurements for positioning of clothing, ties, medals, buttons, shoes, straps, belts, accessories, flags and rifles, following the strict guidelines of the Honor Guard. (This approach was in complete contrast to another sculpture Frudakis was working on concurrently known as Freedom.)

The Air Force Memorial's dedication ceremony in 2006 was attended by approximately 30,000 people, and it began the service's 60th Anniversary Commemoration, "From Heritage to Horizons—Commemorating 60 Years of Air and Space Power."

=== Freedom ===
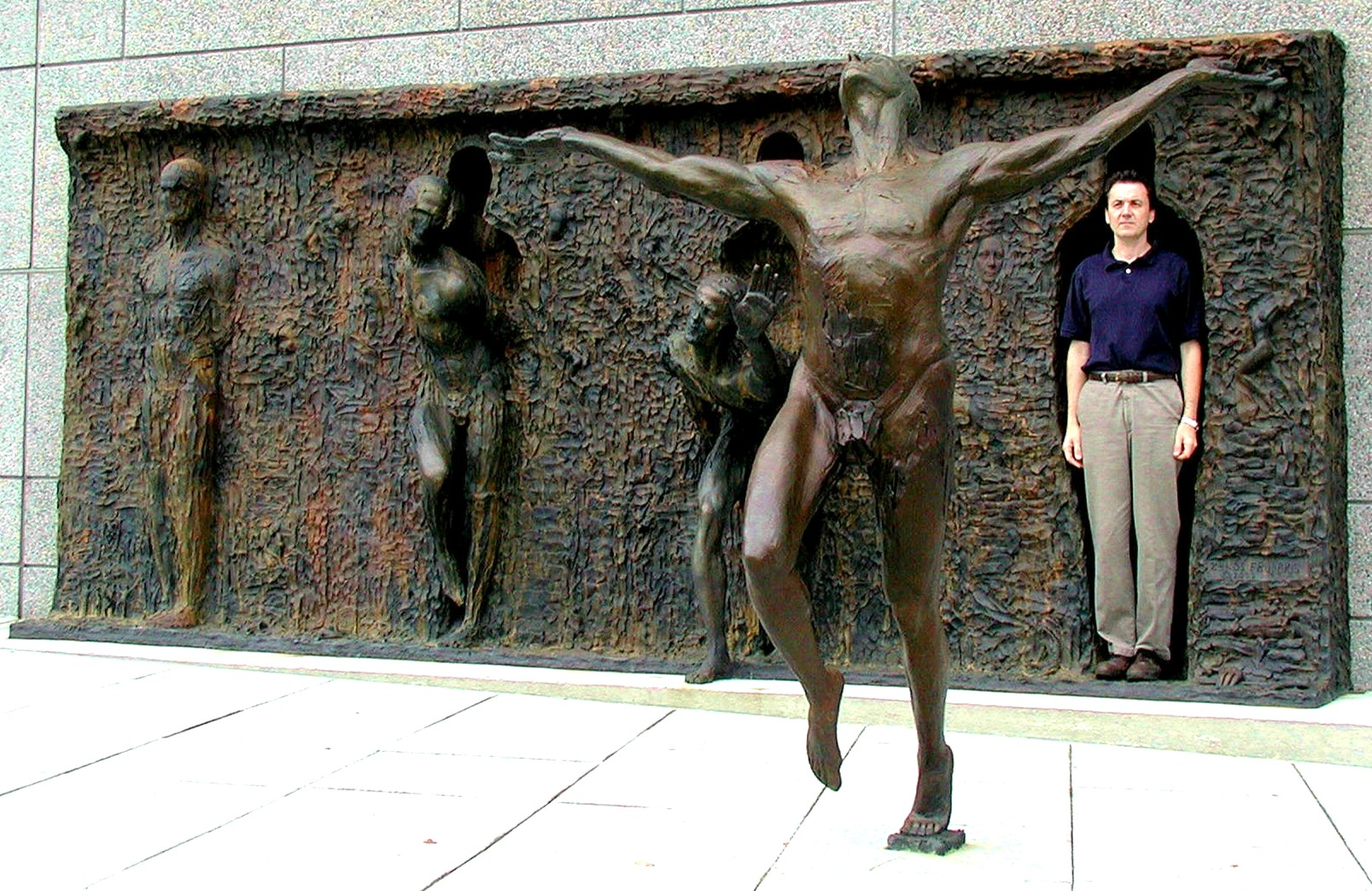
The Freedom sculpture in Philadelphia, PA with sculptor Zenos Frudakis.

Freedom is the most widely recognized public sculpture by Frudakis. Installed in downtown Philadelphia, at 20 ft. long by 8 ft. high and 7,000 lbs., the monument portrays transformation through the sequential emergence of a figure in four stages of breaking free from a wall.

Influenced by Rodin's Gates of Hell, Frudakis includes many smaller sculptures and personal elements within the monument's wall. The bronze's maquette, the sculptor's hand and sculpture tools are cast into the wall. The anatomical man as well as portraits, figures and reliefs are shown partially sculpted, revealing the process of creation.

The back surface of the sculpture's wall (not visible in the current installation) includes additional elements that Frudakis calls the "Other Side of Freedom". It consists of mummified forms in a tomb-like structure that evolved as Frudakis was creating the monument.

== Selected awards ==
- National Endowment for the Arts, development grant, sculpture, national competition, 1985
- Arts America, United States Information Agency, grant for sculpture, travel, lecturing on art in Africa, 1989
- Hakone Award, Utsukushi-ga-hara Open-Air Museum, Rodin Grand Prize, Japan, 1990
- Edwin and Theresa Richards Award for Portraiture, National Sculpture Society
- Silver Medal of Honor, National Sculpture Society, New York City
- President's Prize, Gloria Medal, and Edwin and Theresa Richards Award for Portraiture, National Sculpture Society, NYC
- Honorary Doctorate from Accademico Internationale, Rome, Italy, January 25, 1993

== Selected exhibitions ==
- Southern Alleghenies Museum of the Arts, Ligonier, PA, Jun. – Nov. 2013
- Tampa Museum of Art, Tampa, FL, with National Sculpture Society, 2013
- Brookgreen Gardens, Murrells Inlet, SC, with National Sculpture Society, 2013
- Atwater Kent Museum, Philadelphia, PA, Will We Ever Forget Baseball in Philadelphia, 1876–2004, 2005
- Hakone Open-Air Museum, Hakone, Japan, Third Rodin Grand Prize, International Invitational Exhibition, 1990
- National Sculpture Society Celebrates the Figure, Chairman/exhibitor, Port of History Museum, Philadelphia, PA, 1987
- National Academy of Design, New York, NY, Invited Artist, Juried Annual Exhibitions, 1991, 1993
- National Sculpture Society, New York, NY, Juried Annual Exhibitions, 1979–2000
- Institute of Contemporary Art, MFA Group Shows, Philadelphia, PA. 1981–1983
- National Academy of Design, Juried Annual Exhibitions, New York, NY, 1980, ‘84, ‘86, ’90
- Juried Annual Exhibition, "The Figure: Revolving Traditions," Fairfield University, Fairfield, CT. 1991
- Chesterwood, Stockbridge, MA
- Shidoni Gallery, Santa Fe, NM, 1982, 1992 -1994

== International sculptures ==
- Reaching. Two figures (bronze | 7 ft) Utsukushi-ga-hara Open Air Museum, Japan. 3rd Rodin Grand Prize Exhibition, July 20, 1990.
- Honor Guard. Memorial (Bronze | 16 ft) Imperial War Museum, Duxford, England. Dedication 2018.
- Martin Luther King and Freedom. Public sculpture (Bronze | life size) Peace Garden, University of New South Wales, Sydney, Australia. Dedication October 19, 2018.
- Hon. Dame Lois Browne-Evans. Statue (Bronze | life-size) Justice Center, Dame Lois Browne Evans Building (Police/Justice Center) Hamilton, Bermuda. Dedication June 2011.
- Arnold Palmer. Statue (Bronze | over-life-size) Tralee Golf Club, Tralee, County Kerry, Ireland. Dedication September 10, 2007.
- Dr. Constantine Papadakis. Drexel University President. Portrait bust (Bronze | life size) Town Square, Meskla, Greece. Dedication July 24, 2010.
- Lamby (Abigail), Irish Wolfhound. Statue (Bronze | 12 ft × 11 ft) Old Bladbean Stud Garden, Canterbury, Kent, England.
- Dr. Martin Luther King Jr., South Africa. Portrait bust (Bronze, granite base | life size) U.S. Embassy, Pretoria, South Africa. Dedication: January 16, 1989.
- Dr. Constantine 'Taki' Papadakis. Memorial (Bronze | life size) Public Square in Meskla, Greece. Dedication: July 24, 2010.

== American sculptures ==
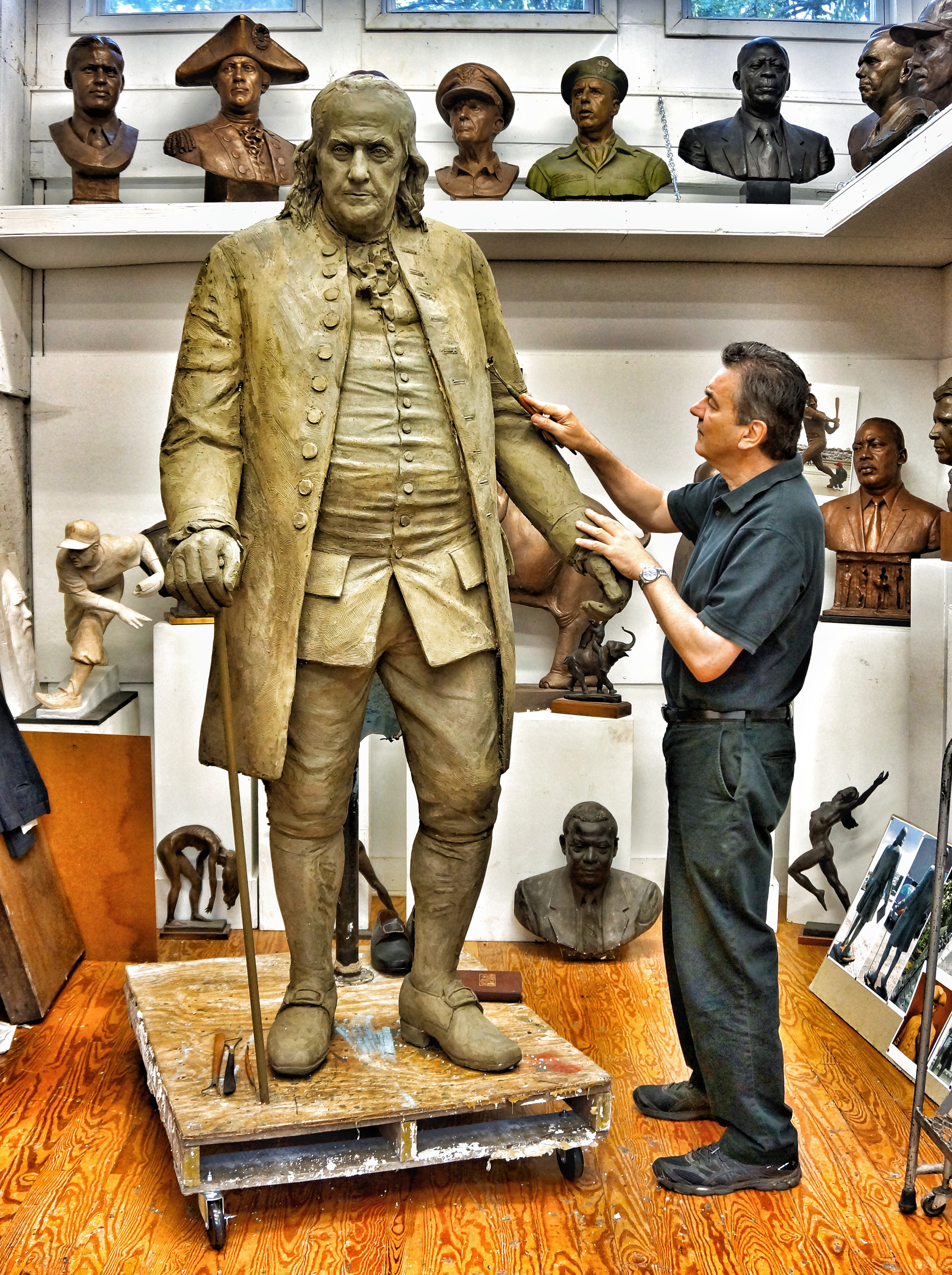
Zenos Frudakis sculpting Benjamin Franklin.

In a career spanning over four decades, Frudakis has produced monumental figures such as the United States Air Force Memorial Honor Guard Installed at the Arlington National Cemetery, and Freedom in Philadelphia, Pennsylvania

=== Monumental sculptures ===
- Freedom. Monument (Bronze | 20 ft × 8 ft | 7,000 lbs) 16th and Vine Streets, Philadelphia, Pennsylvania. Completed 2000. Dedication June 18, 2001.
- U.S. Air Force Memorial Honor Guard. Memorial (Bronze | Monument) Arlington National Cemetery, Arlington, Virginia. Dedication: October 14, 2006.
- Knowledge is Power. Monument (Bronze | 8 ft × 15 ft | 1,500 lbs) Over 30 portraits from intellectual history, two 8 ft figures free standing. Relief wall portraits: Harriet Tubman, Martin Luther King Jr., Rachel Carson, Harriet Beecher Stowe, Darwin, Albert Einstein, Alan Turing, John Muir, Thoreau. Rowan University, Glassboro, New Jersey. Dedication November 21, 2014.
- Dr. Martin Luther King, Jr.. Monument (Bronze portrait bust, granite base / 5 ft / 685 lbs) Martin Luther King Park, J. Lewis Crozer Library, Chester, Pennsylvania. Dedication November 23, 2010.
- The Path to Manhood. Monument (Bronze | Over-life-size) Perot Quadrangle, St. Mark's School of Texas, Dallas, Texas.

=== Memorials ===
- U.S. Air Force Memorial Honor Guard. Memorial (Bronze | Monument) Arlington National Cemetery, Arlington, Virginia. Dedication: October 14, 2006.
- Molly Maguires Memorial. (Bronze | larger-than-life) Molly Maguires Memorial Park, Mahanoy City, Pennsylvania. Dedication: June 21, 2002
- The Workers' Memorial. (Bronze | 8 ft figure, Mayari-r Steel circle, granite base | 2,500 lbs) The Rose Garden, Bethlehem, Pennsylvania. Sponsored by 20 unions, 15 non-union industries, 3 cities: Allentown, Bethlehem, Easton Pennsylvania. Dedication: April 28, 1991.
- Anthracite Miners' Memorial. Relief (Bronze | Left and right panels 6 × 4 ft, central panel 8 ft sq) Giard Park, Shenandoah, Pennsylvania. Dedication: 1996.
- Nina Simone. Memorial (Bronze, local stone | 8 ft figure) Nina Simone Plaza, Tryon, North Carolina. Dedication: February 21, 2010.
- Henry L. Bowden. Memorial (Bronze bas-relief | over-life-size) Henry L. Bowden Hall, Emory University, Atlanta, Georgia. Dedication: 1991
- Mr. and Mrs Hillenbrand. Memorial (Bronze bas-relief | life size) Batesville Memorial Public Library, Batesville, Indiana. Dedication: 1988.
- Veterans Memorial. Memorial (Bronze | over-life-size) Henry L. Bowden Hall, Emory University, Collegeville, Pennsylvania. Dedication: 1991.

=== Statues ===
- Clarence Darrow. Statue (Bronze | 7 ft) Rhea County Courthouse, Dayton, Tennessee. Dedication: July 14, 2017.
- Ellis Arnall. Statue (Bronze | over-life-size) Georgia State Capitol, Atlanta, Georgia. Dedication: November 24, 1997.
- Frederick Law Olmsted. Statue (Bronze, stone base | 8 ft) Blue Ridge Court, The North Carolina Arboretum, Asheville, North Carolina. Dedication: April 22, 2015.
- Michael Kahn, former Artistic Director, Shakespeare Theatre Company. Statue (Bronze | life size) Sidney Harman Hall, Shakespeare Theatre Company, Washington, DC. Private Collection. Completed: 2012.
- John D. MacArthur. Statue (Bronze, granite base | 8 ft figure, 3 ft base | 750 lbs) Palm Beach Gardens, North Palm Beach, Florida. Dedication: November 21, 2010.
- Frank L. Rizzo Monument. Statue. (Bronze | over-life-size) Municipal Services Building, Philadelphia, Pennsylvania. Dedication: January 1, 1999.
  - Removed June 3, 2020, after the murder of George Floyd following years of controversy.

=== Sports sculptures ===
==== Boxing ====
- James J. Braddock, the Cinderella Man. Statue (Bronze | 10 ft | 1,500 lbs). Braddock Park, North Bergen, New Jersey. Dedication: September 26, 2018.

==== Golf ====
- Payne Stewart. (Bronze | over-life-size). Pinehurst Resort, Pinehurst, North Carolina. Dedication: 2001
- Payne Stewart. Statue (Bronze | life size). Coyote Hills Golf Club, Fullerton, California.
- Payne Stewart. Portrait bust (Bronze | life size). Private collection.
- Arnold Palmer. Statue (Bronze | over-life size). Georgia Golf Hall of Fame, Augusta, Georgia. Dedication: April 9, 1996.
- Arnold Palmer. Statue (Bronze | over-life size). Arnold Palmer Airport, Latrobe, Pennsylvania; Laurel Valley Country Club, Ligonier, Pennsylvania; Tralee, Ireland.
- Jack Nicklaus. Statue (Bronze, granite base | 48 inches). USGA Museum, Jack Nicklaus Room, Far Hills, New Jersey. Dedication: May 27, 2015.
- Jack Nicklaus. Portrait bust (Bronze, stone base | life size). Private collection.
- Jack Nicklaus and Dwight Gahm. Statue (Bronze | life size). Valhalla Golf Club, Louisville, Kentucky. Dedication: March 8, 2016.
- Dinah Shore Wall of Champions. Relief sculpture (Bronze, Cantera stone | life size). Mission Hills Country Club and Resort, Rancho Mirage, California. Dedication: March 26, 1995.
- Robert H. Dedman Sr.. Statue (Bronze | 7 ft | sculpted from life). Pinehurst Resort, North Carolina.
- Richard Tufts. Statue (Bronze | over-life size). Walk of Fame, Pinehurst Resort, North Carolina.
- Bob Jones. Portrait bust (Bronze | life size). East Lake Golf Club, Atlanta, Georgia.
- Bob Jones. Statue (Bronze | over-life-size). Georgia Golf Hall of Fame, Augusta, Georgia.

==== Baseball ====
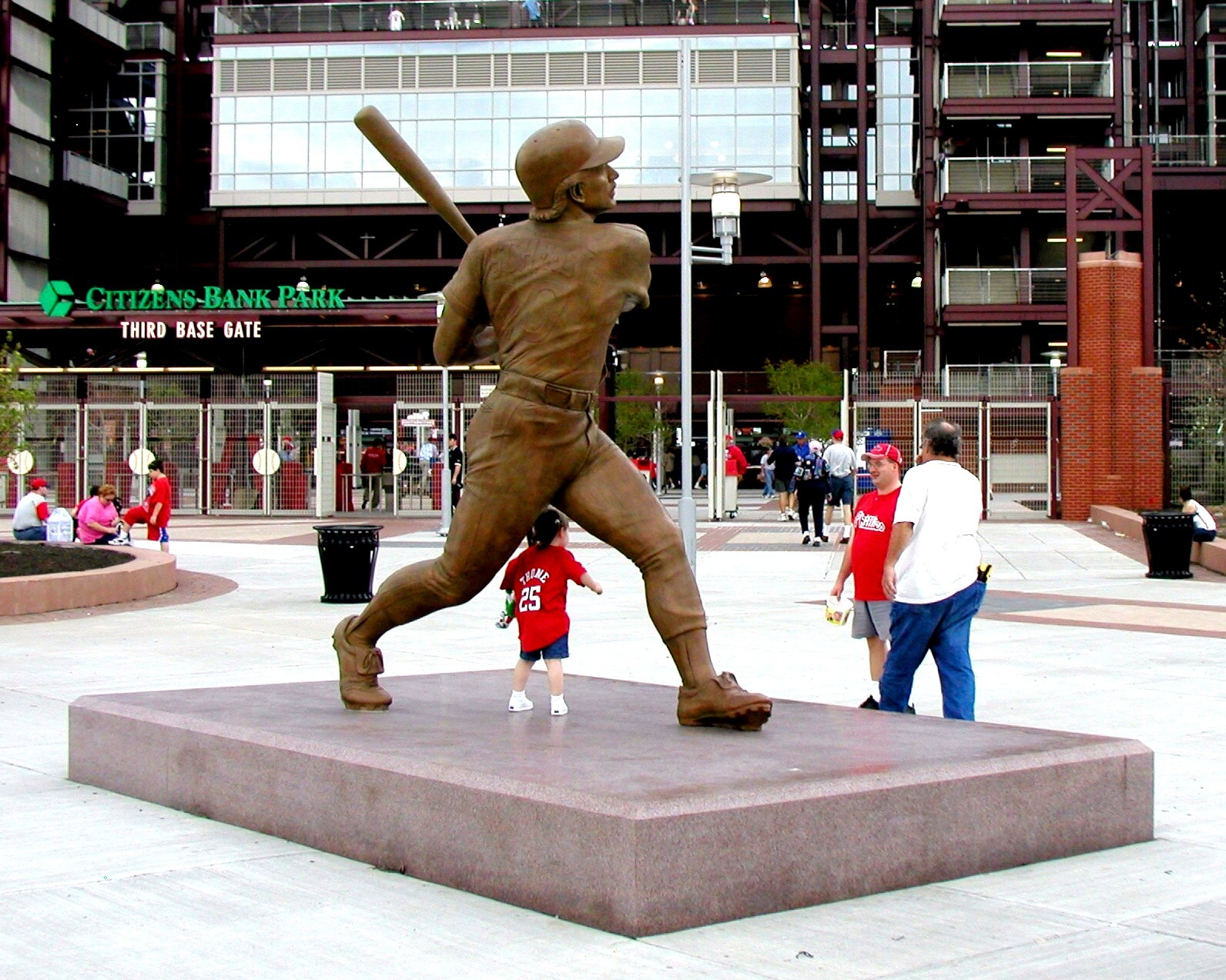
Mike Schmidt sculpture by Zenos, Citizens Bank Park, Philadelphia, PA.

- Mike Schmidt. Portrait bust (Bronze | life size | sculpted from life). Private collection.
- Mike Schmidt. Statue (Bronze | 10 ft | sculpted from life). Citizens Bank Park, Philadelphia, Pennsylvania. Dedication: April 12, 2004.
- Steve Carlton. Statue (Bronze | 10 ft | sculpted from life). Citizens Bank Park, Philadelphia, Pennsylvania. Dedication: April 12, 2004.
- Richie Ashburn. Statue (Bronze | 10 ft | sculpted from life). Citizens Bank Park, Philadelphia, Pennsylvania. Dedication: April 12, 2004.
- Robin Roberts. Statue (Bronze | 10 ft | sculpted from life). Citizens Bank Park, Philadelphia, Pennsylvania. Dedication: April 12, 2004.
- Joe DiMaggio and Young Boy. Statue (Bronze | over-life-size | sculpted from life). DiMaggio Children's Hospital, Hollywood, Florida. Dedication: October 10, 2002.
- Danny Murtaugh Relief sculpture, Boston Braves, 1947 (Bronze | relief | 28 × 34 | over 100 lbs.). Athletes Hall of Fame, Chadds Ford, Pennsylvania. Dedication: November 20, 2011.

==== Hockey ====
- Brian Propp. Portrait bust (Bronze | life size). Philadelphia Flyers Hall of Fame. Additional casting in private collection.

==== Coaches ====
- Coach Fritz Brennan Statue (Bronze | 8 ft). Lower Merion High School Arnold Field, Montgomery Avenue, Ardmore, Pennsylvania. Completed: 1990 .
- Coach Ron Fraser. Statue (Bronze | 7 ft). University of Miami, Miami, Florida. Dedication: April 24, 2015.
- Coach "Lake" Staffieri. Relief (Bronze | life size). Franklin Field, University of Pennsylvania, Philadelphia, Pennsylvania. Dedication: 2010.

=== Award Sculptures ===
- General MacArthur Award. (Bronze | 14 in.) General MacArthur Memorial Foundation. Given to top junior officers of the four military branches annually at the Pentagon.
- The Arnie Award. (Bronze | 14 in.) Conde Nast and Golf Digest award for philanthropy.
- The Bob Jones Award. (Bronze | 18 in.) US Golf Association award given annually recognizing individuals who demonstrates the spirit, personal character and respect for the game exhibited by Jones, winner of nine USGA championships. It is the highest honor bestowed by the USGA.
- Forward Award. (Bronze | 17 in.) Freedom From Religion Foundation. Given annually to those who work to protect separation of church and state.
- Darrow Award. (Bronze | 17 in.) Freedom From Religion Foundation. Annual award in recognition of civil libertarians who promote science and evolution, and/or freethought, as Darrow advocated.

== Gallery ==
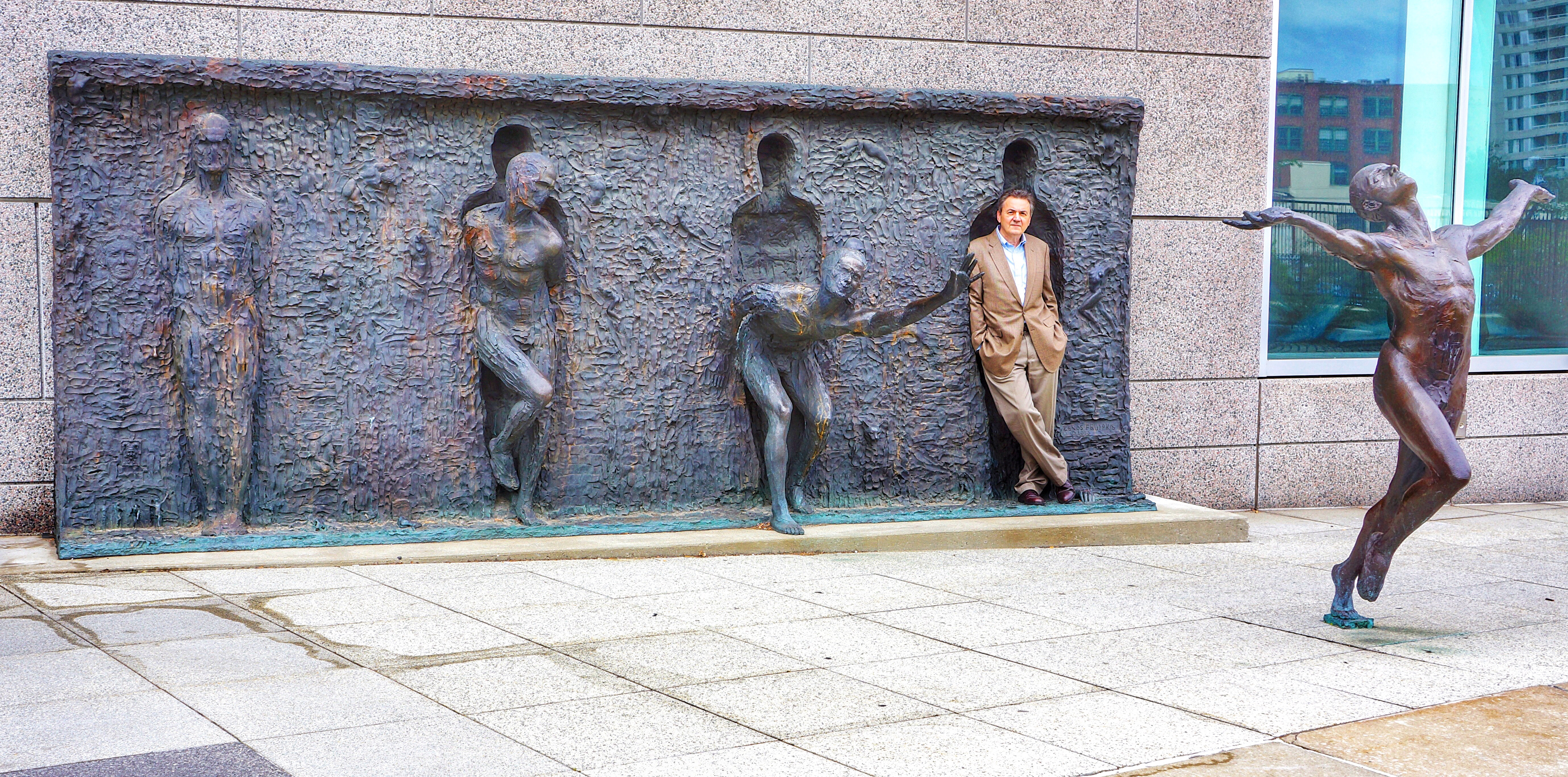
Freedom sculpture in Philadelphia, PA with sculptor Zenos.

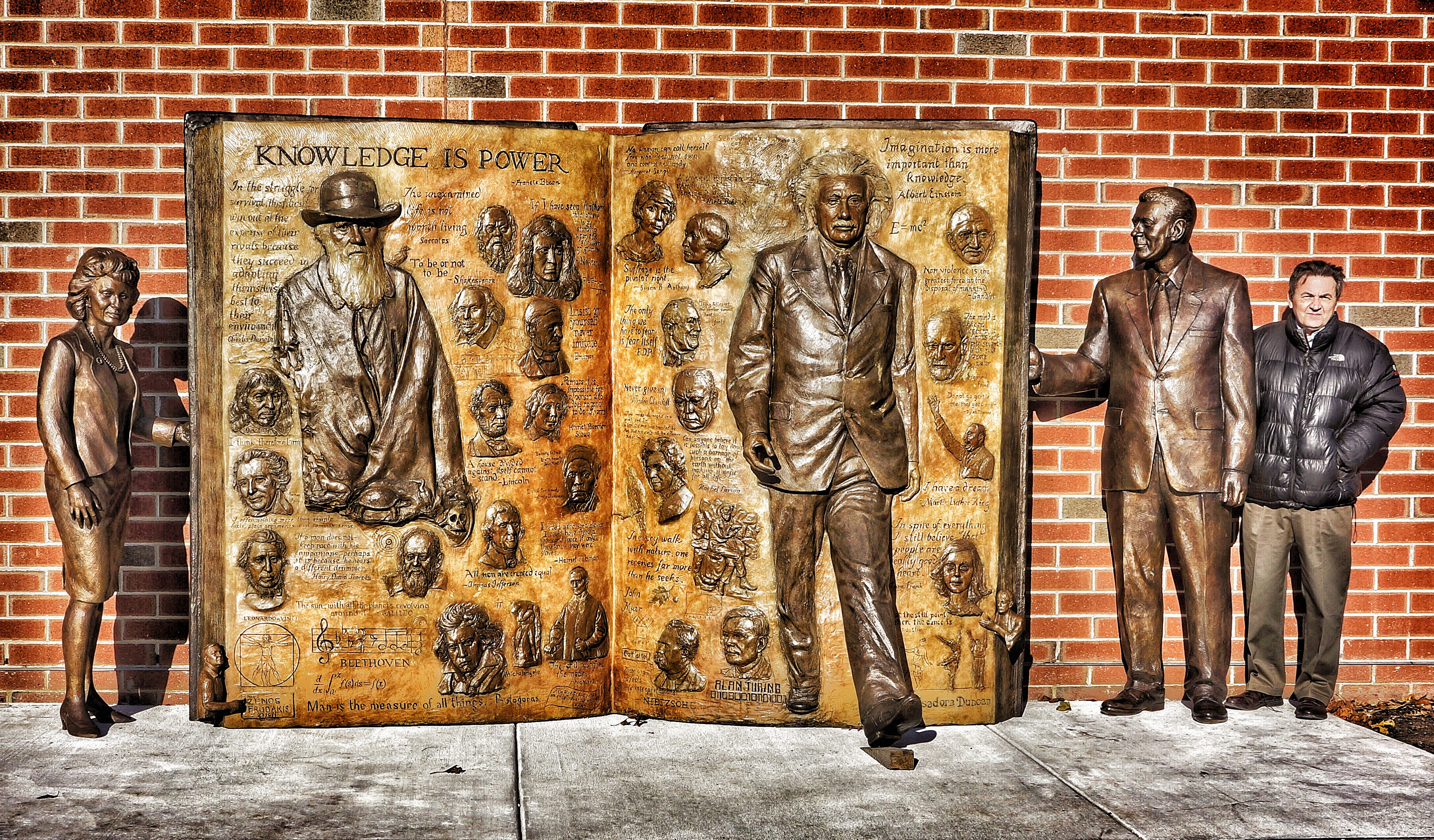
Knowledge is Power with Zenos Frudakis

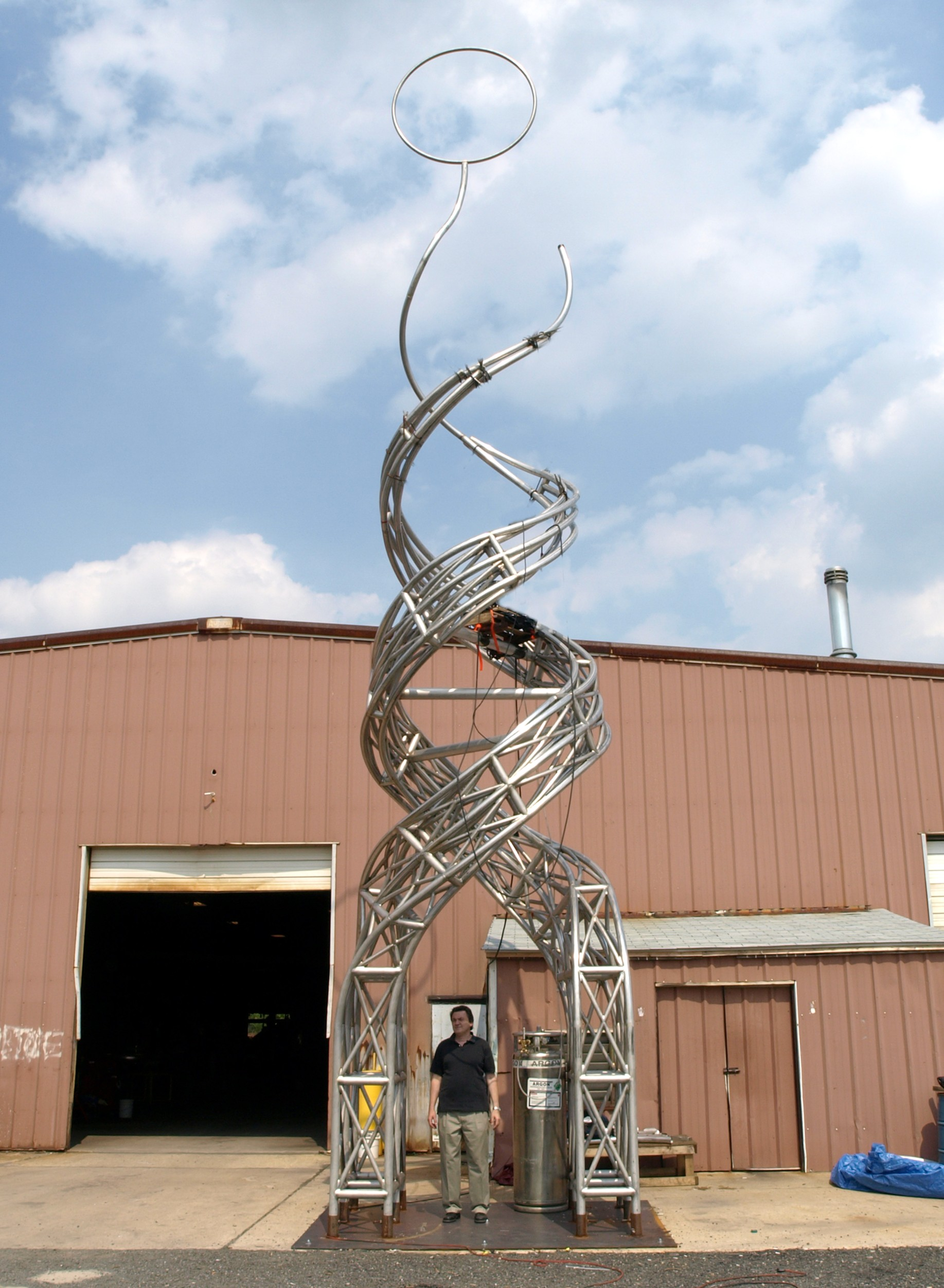
Gateway to Growth (in progress)

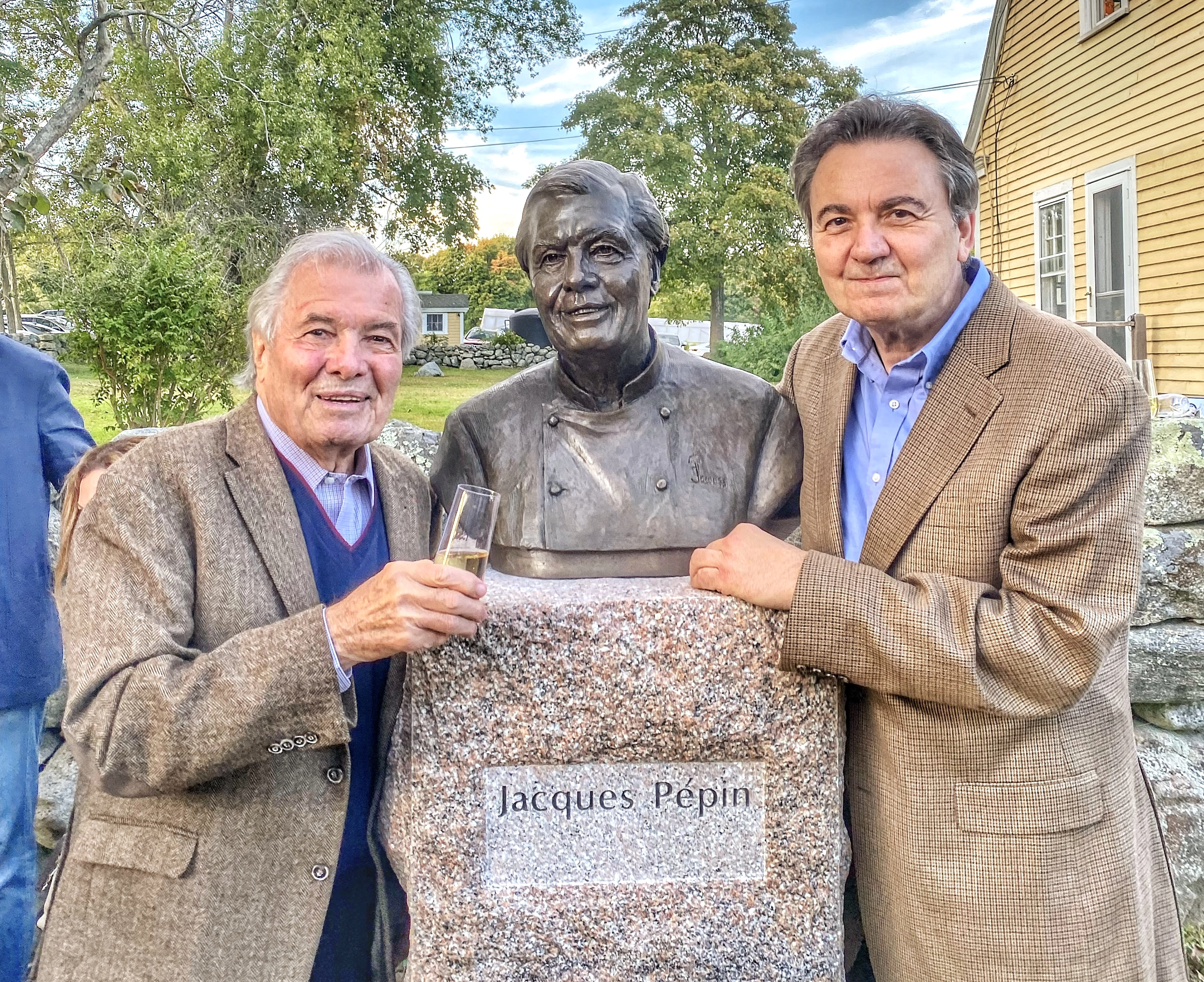
Chef Pepin, portrait sculpture and Zenos

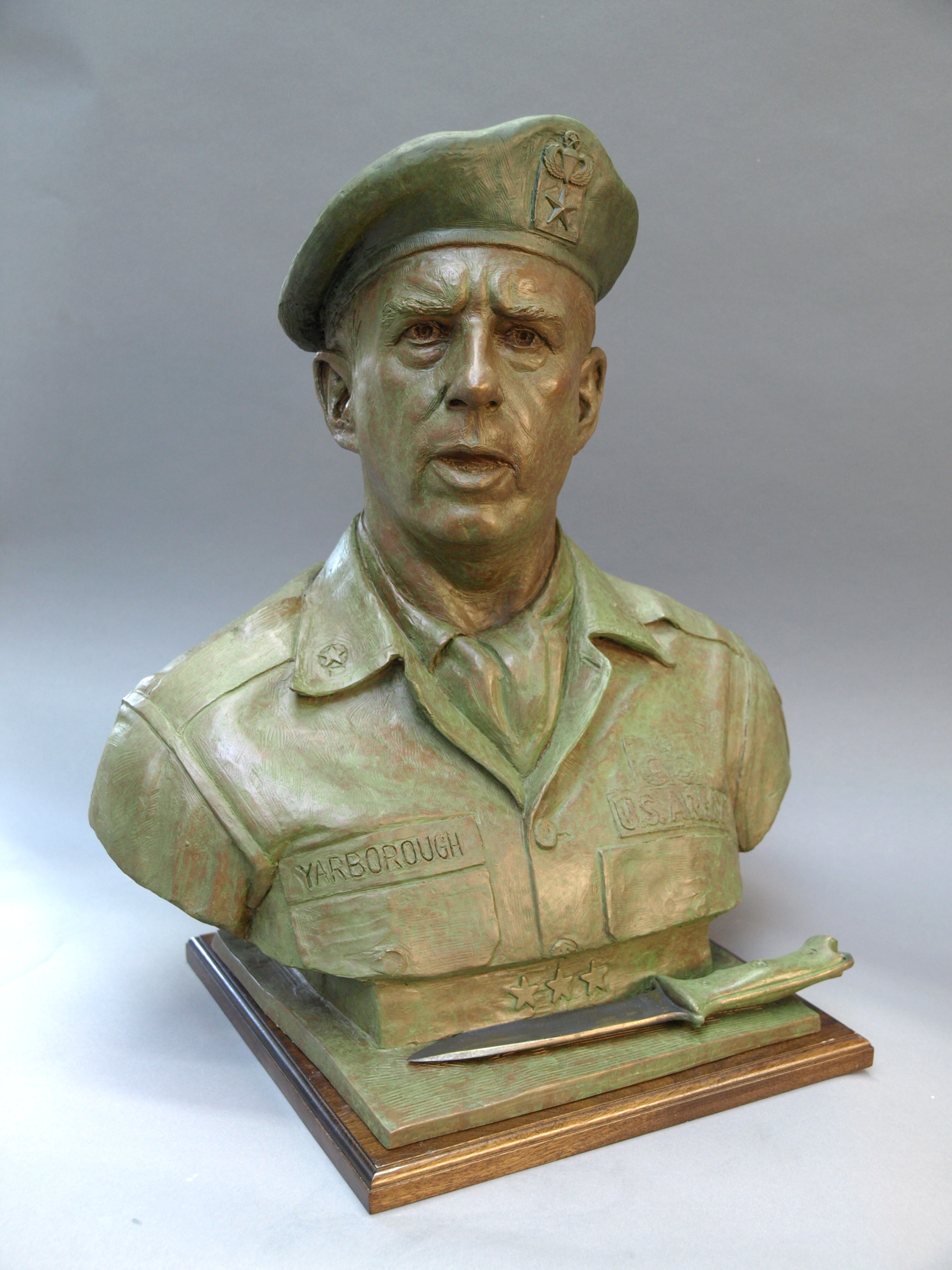
General Yarborough, Airborne & Special Ops Museum, Fayetteville, NC

Jack Nicklaus, Dwight Gahm Valhalla Golf Club, Louisville, KY

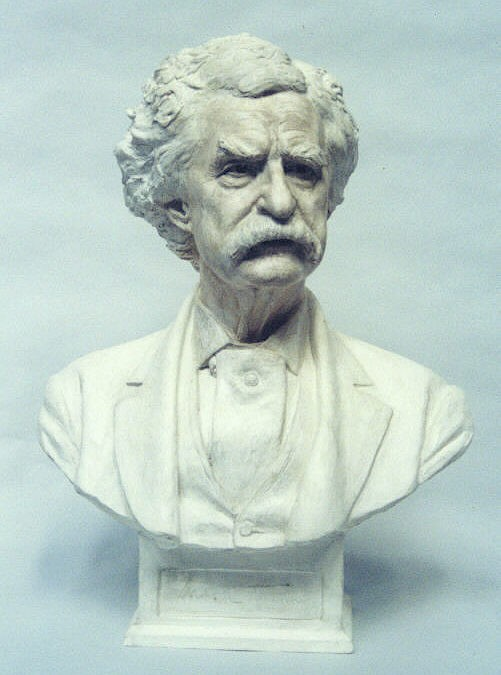
Mark Twain, The Lotos Club, New York, NY

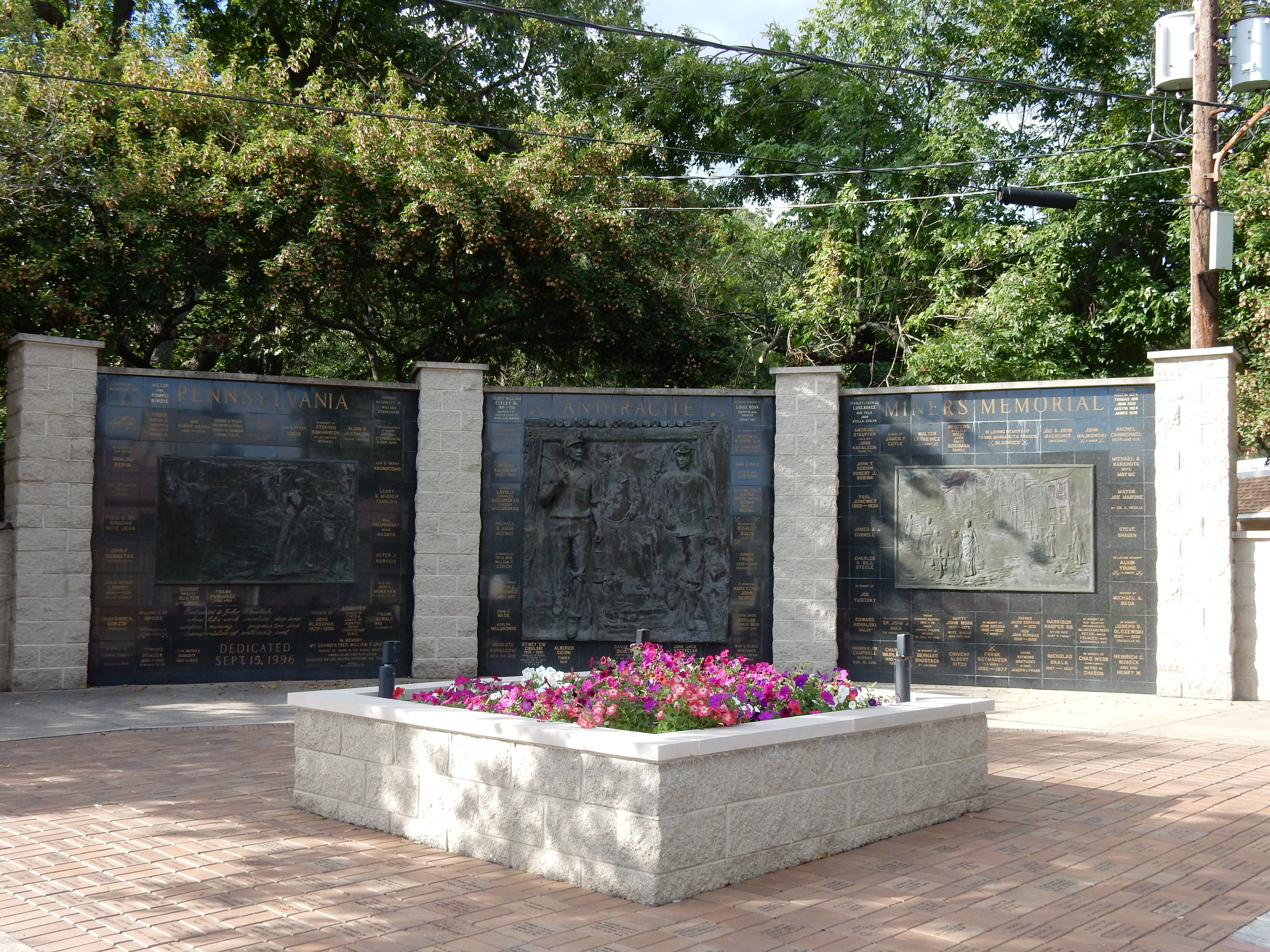
Pennsylvania Anthracite Miners Memorial in Shenandoah, PA by Zenos Frudakis.

== See also ==
- Brookgreen Gardens
- Hakone Open-Air Museum
- Arnold Palmer
- Laurel Valley Golf Club
- Valhalla Golf Club
- Citizens Bank Park
- Statue of Ellis Arnall
- List of public art in Philadelphia
- List of public art in Indianapolis
- Mahanoy City, Pennsylvania
