= George Floyd protests in Philadelphia =

- Part of George Floyd protests in Pennsylvania
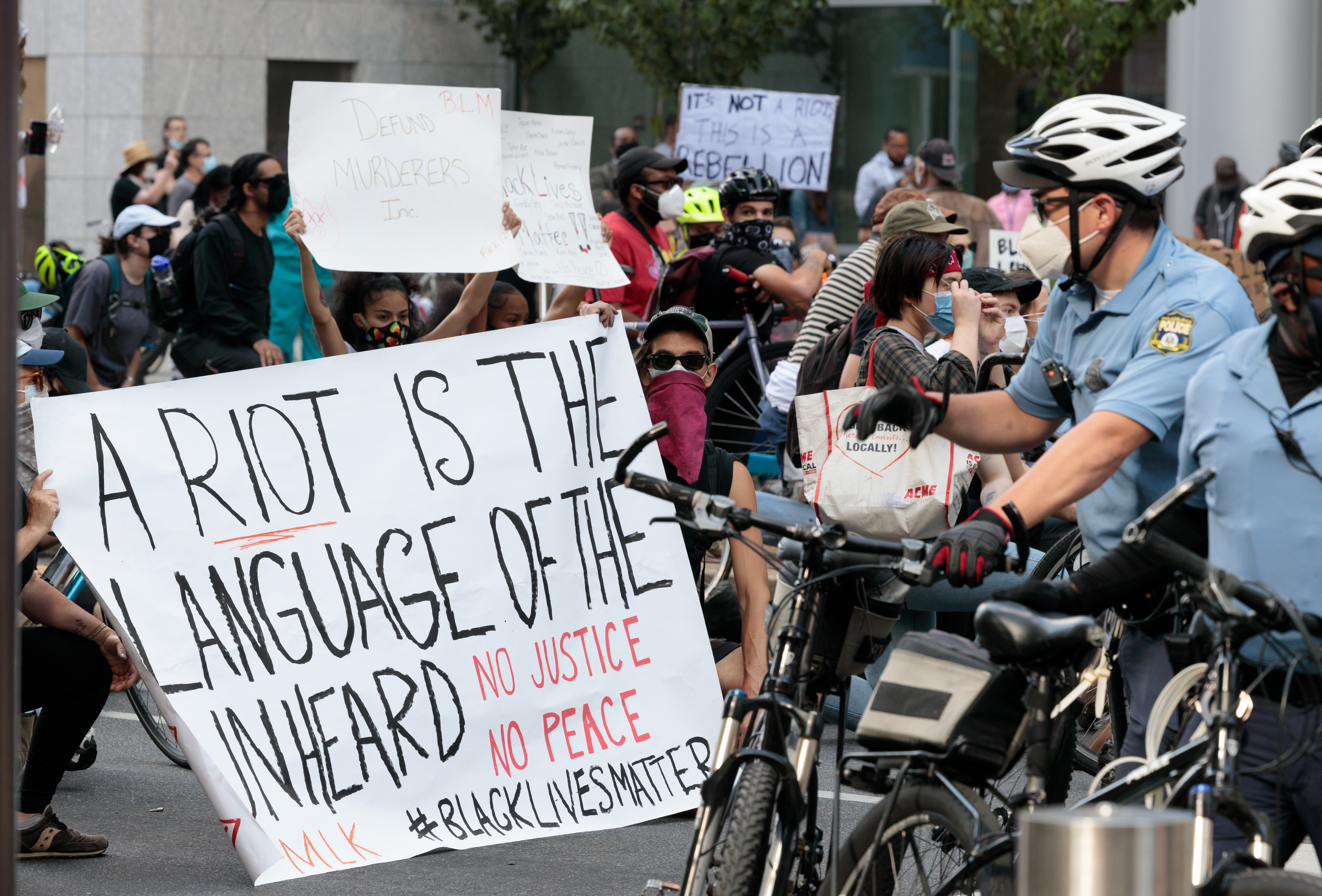
- Protesters in Philadelphia on June 1
- Date: May 30 – June 23, 2020 (3 weeks and 3 days)
- Location: Philadelphia, Pennsylvania, United States
- Caused by: Police brutality; Institutional racism against African Americans; Reaction to the murder of George Floyd; Economic, racial and social inequality
- Result: Statues and murals dedicated to Frank Rizzo and Christopher Columbus are dismantled; Numerous buildings and businesses are looted, vandalized, and/or burned

Casualties
- Deaths: 2

The George Floyd protests and riots in Philadelphia were a series of protests and riots occurring in the City of Philadelphia. Unrest in the city began as a response to the murder of George Floyd in police custody in Minneapolis on May 25, 2020. Numerous protests, rallies and marches took place in Philadelphia in solidarity with protesters in Minneapolis and across the United States. These demonstrations call for justice for Floyd and protest police brutality. After several days of protests and riots, Philadelphia leadership joined other major cities, including Chicago in instituting a curfew, beginning Saturday, May 30, at 8 p.m. The protests concluded on June 23, 2020.

== Events ==
=== Context ===
On May 25, 2020, George Floyd, a 46-year-old black man, was murdered by a police officer, Derek Chauvin, in Minneapolis, Minnesota. Derek Chauvin, a white police officer, knelt on Floyd's neck for over nine minutes while Floyd was handcuffed and lying face down in the street, begging for his life and repeatedly saying "I can't breathe". A second and third officer further restrained Floyd while a fourth prevented bystanders from intervening. Videos of Floyd's murder circulated widely, and by the next day protests began in Minneapolis and later spread across the United States, including to Philadelphia, and then internationally.

Floyd's murder is one of many widely publicized police killings of unarmed African-Americans in the United States. His murder has been compared to the 2014 killing of Eric Garner. Garner, also an unarmed black man, repeated "I can't breathe" eleven times after being placed in a chokehold by a New York police officer during an arrest in Staten Island, New York.

=== May 30 ===
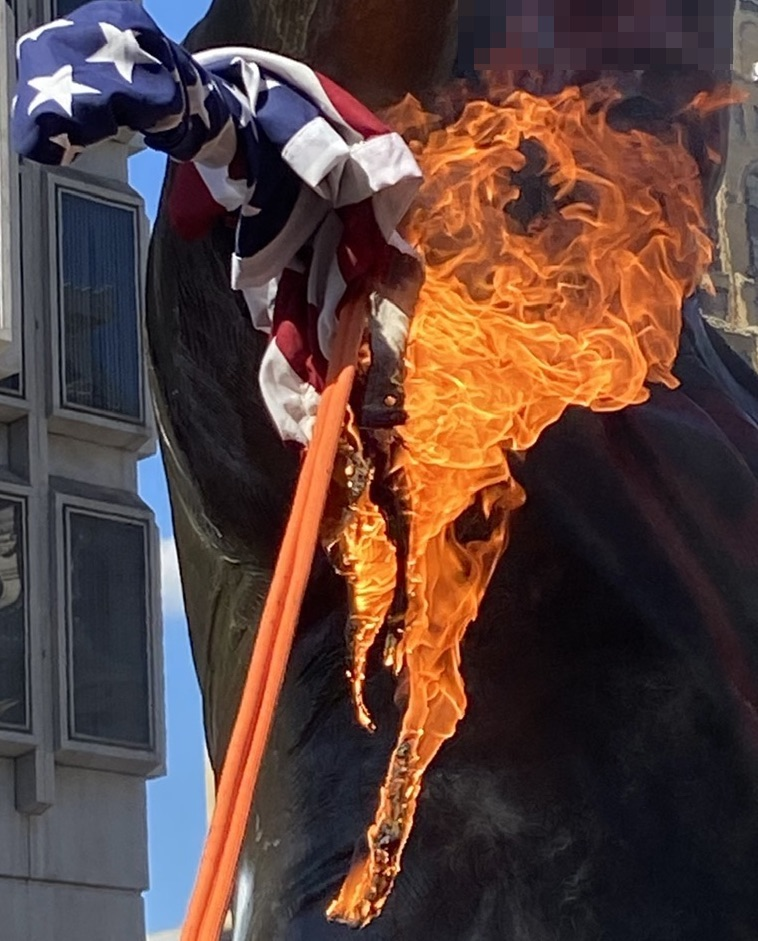
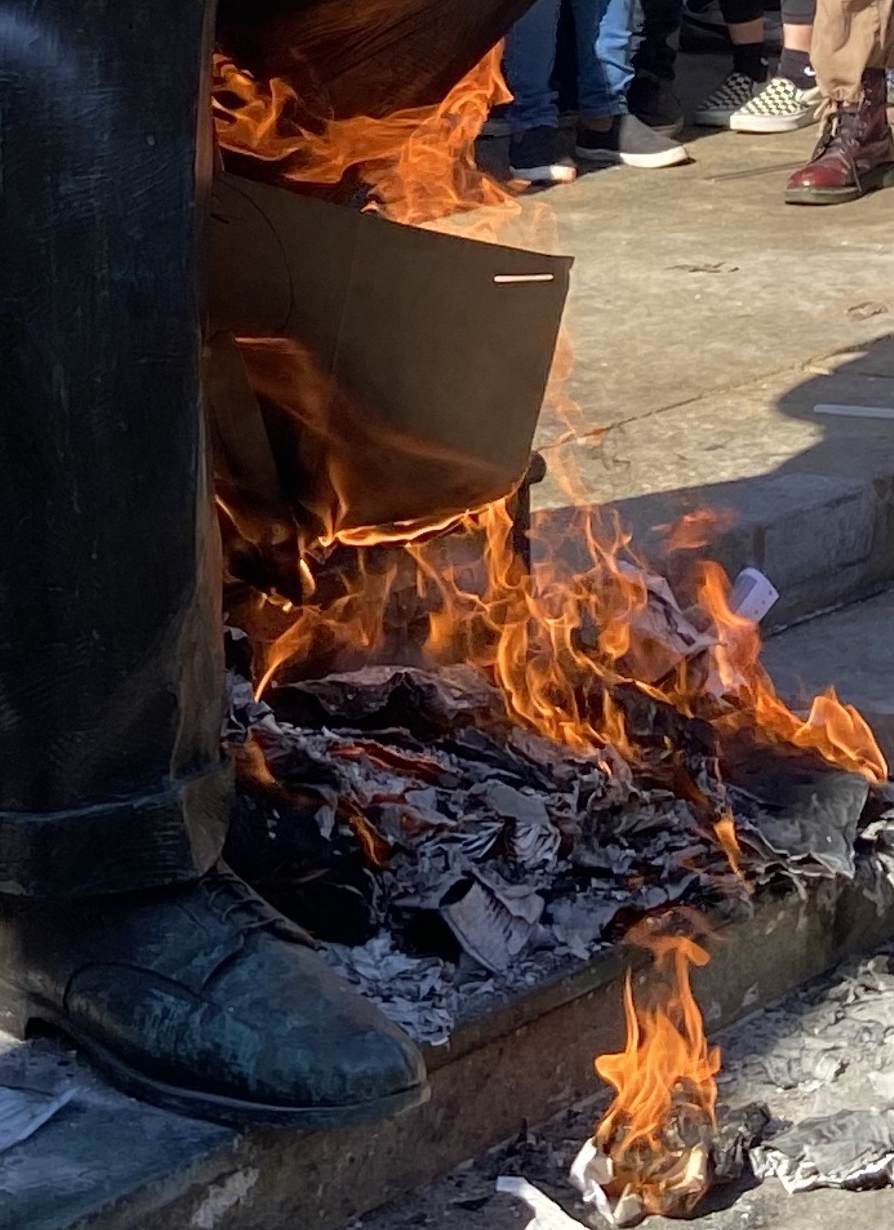
Protesters graffitied and set fire to the statue of Frank Rizzo outside City Hall.

Protests began outside Philadelphia City Hall at noon. At City Hall, protesters knelt and engaged in nine minutes of silence, referencing the amount of time Chauvin knelt on Floyd's neck. At around 1 p.m., protesters marched from City Hall to the Philadelphia Museum of Art for a planned 2 p.m. demonstration. Later protests included the burning of several police vehicles. Several businesses in Center City Philadelphia were looted and a large fire broke out in a three-story building at 17th Street and Walnut Street. A statue of Frank Rizzo, a former mayor and police commissioner, was spray-painted, and unsuccessful attempts were made to tear it down. A number of protesters set fires under the statue using paper and scrape pieces of wood. Removal of the statue has been discussed by Philadelphia officials since at least 2017. A total of 13 police officers were injured and over 200 people were arrested. A police officer was hit by a car while attempting to stop looters at 52nd Street and Chestnut Street; the officer was taken to the hospital with a broken arm and other injuries. Mayor Jim Kenney issued a curfew effective at 8 p.m. for that night.

=== May 31 ===
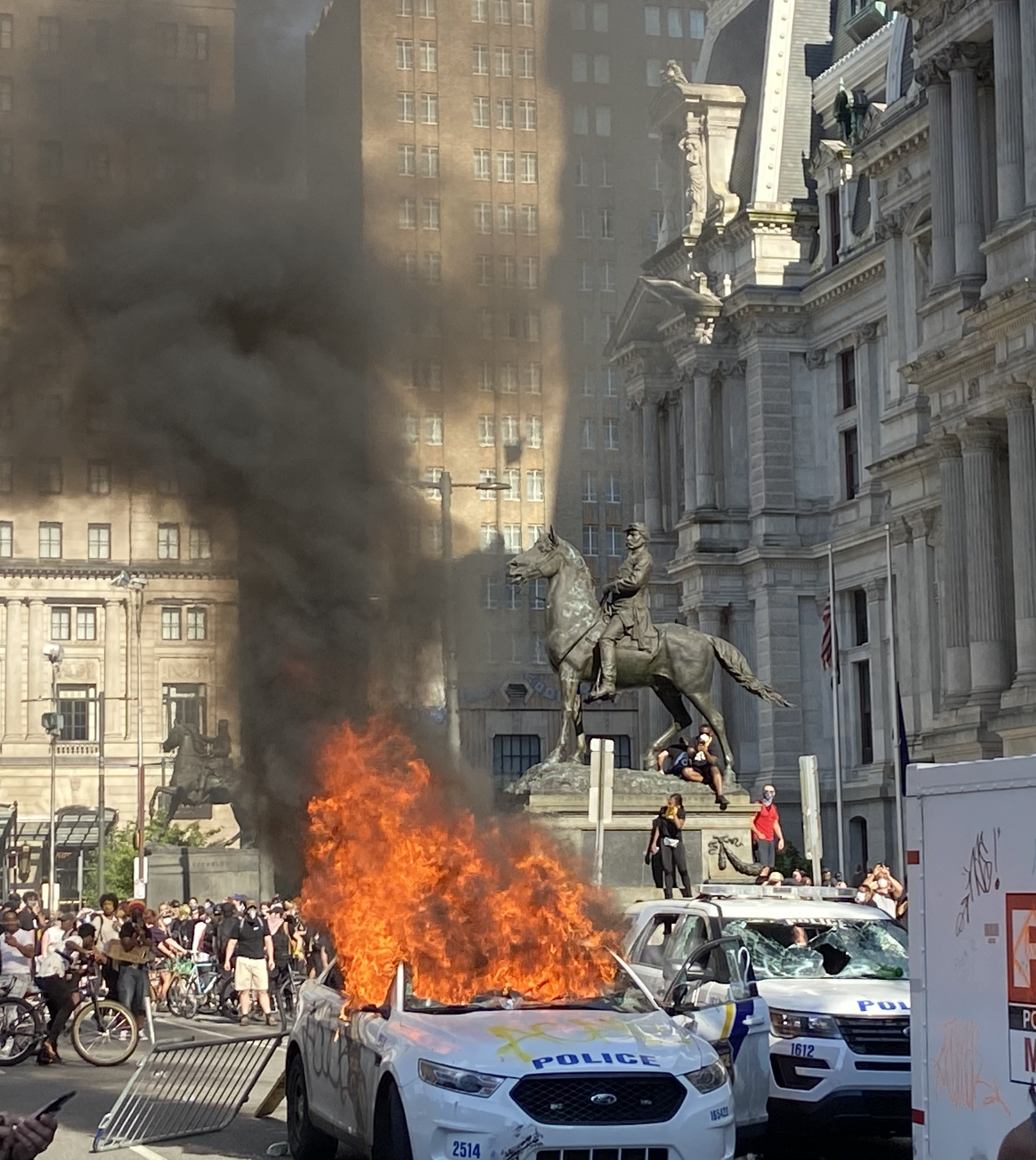
A police car on fire outside City Hall on May 30

The Pennsylvania National Guard was called into Philadelphia during the second day of protests. Workers and volunteers cleaned broken windows and trash in Center City. Streets in Center City were closed to traffic. Looting and destruction continued in Center City and spread to other parts of the city including Northeast Philadelphia, North Philadelphia, and West Philadelphia. Police cars were set on fire in West Philadelphia. A curfew went into effect at 6 p.m.

On this day, Police Staff Inspector Joseph Bologna was videoed lunging at a journalist, and hitting a security guard. He was also involved in other controversial incidents on June 1 and June 2.

=== June 1 ===
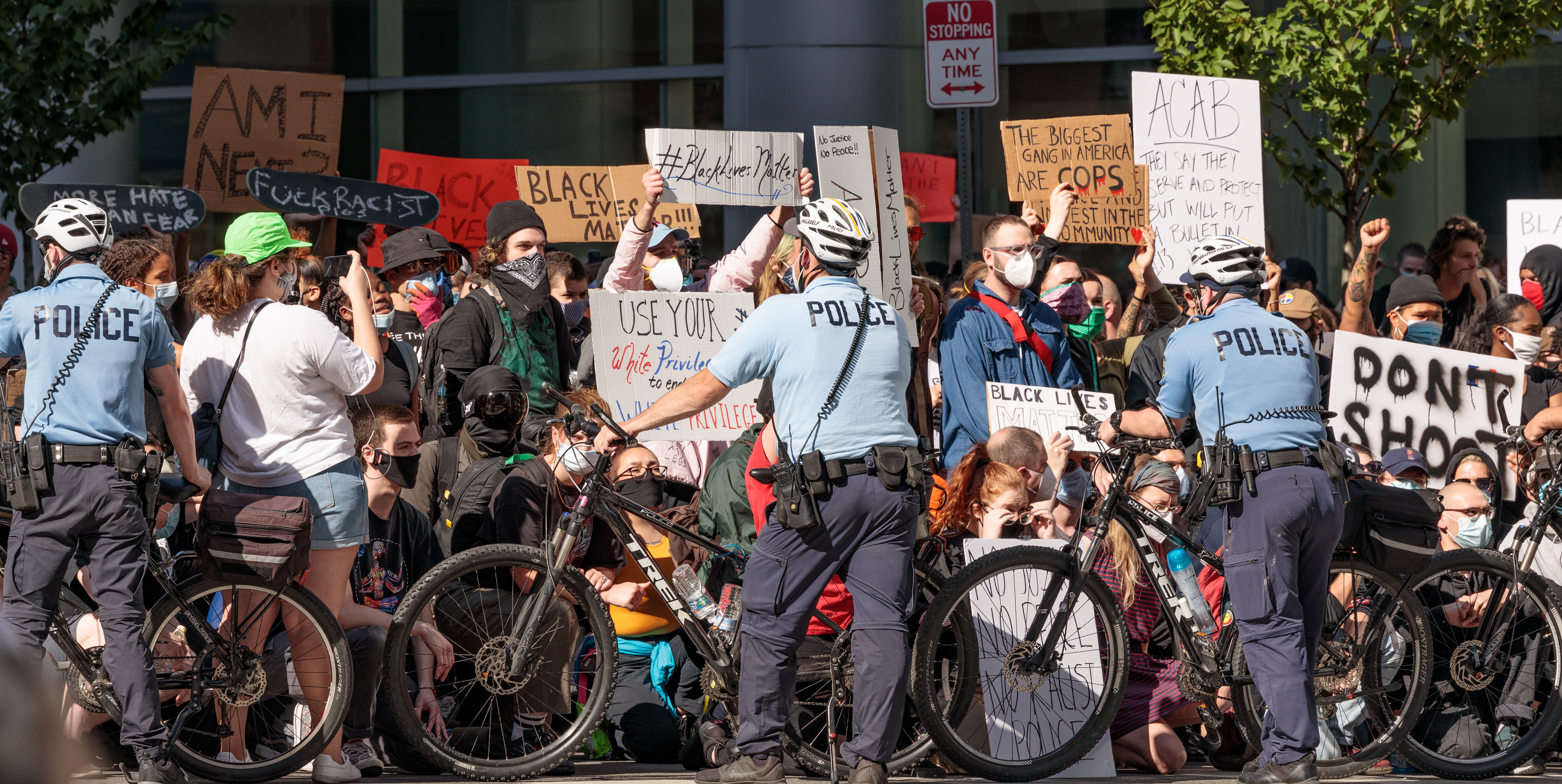
Police and protesters in Philadelphia on June 1

During a large demonstration, hundreds of protesters split off from the group and marched onto Interstate 676 (Vine Street Expressway). When they were approximately halfway through a tunnel, a SWAT team appeared and began firing rubber bullets at protesters, prompting them to retreat. SWAT officers proceeded to fire tear gas and pepper spray into the crowd. Cell phone footage showed one SWAT officer pepper spraying a protester at point-blank range, while another officer pulled down a protester's mask before pepper spraying her in the face. Amid the commotion, police formed a line under an adjacent overpass, pinning the protesters in and forcing them up a steep fenced-in embankment. Police continued firing tear gas into the crowd as protesters clambered up the hill and over the 10-foot fence to escape. After several minutes, a group of police officers charged up the hill and began dragging down and arresting remaining protesters.

The incident sparked outrage across the city. Later that day, Philadelphia mayor Jim Kenney and police commissioner Danielle Outlaw defended the police's use of tear gas, claiming that protesters had charged a SWAT vehicle and threw rocks at officers. However, eyewitness reports from local journalists and protesters, as well as both cell phone and aerial footage, disputed these claims.

On June 23, state police released dashcam footage from one of the SWAT vehicles contradicting the city's initial claims and featuring one officer specifically referring to the protesters as "peaceful." Two days later, the New York Times released a comprehensive video of the incident, demonstrating that the protest had been entirely peaceful and thoroughly debunking the city's claims to the contrary. City Councilmember Helen Gym called the video "horrifying and a complete indictment of our city's failure to a manage the events surrounding demonstrations against police brutality." Hours after the video was released, Kenney and Outlaw issued a formal apology to the protesters for the use of tear gas, claiming they received "bad intel." In response, Outlaw imposed a moratorium on the use of tear gas, demoted the commanding officer who authorized the use of tear gas and suspended the officer who pepper sprayed the protester in the face.

Protesters in Fishtown reported being harassed and threatened by a group of 50 to 70 armed white men, one of whom destroyed a protester's sign while using homophobic slurs.

On this day, Police Staff Inspector Joseph Bologna, who was also involved in controversial incidents on May 31 and June 2, allegedly attacked a student protester with a baton, and the incident was caught on video. Bologna was later suspended and charged with aggravated assault.

=== June 2 ===
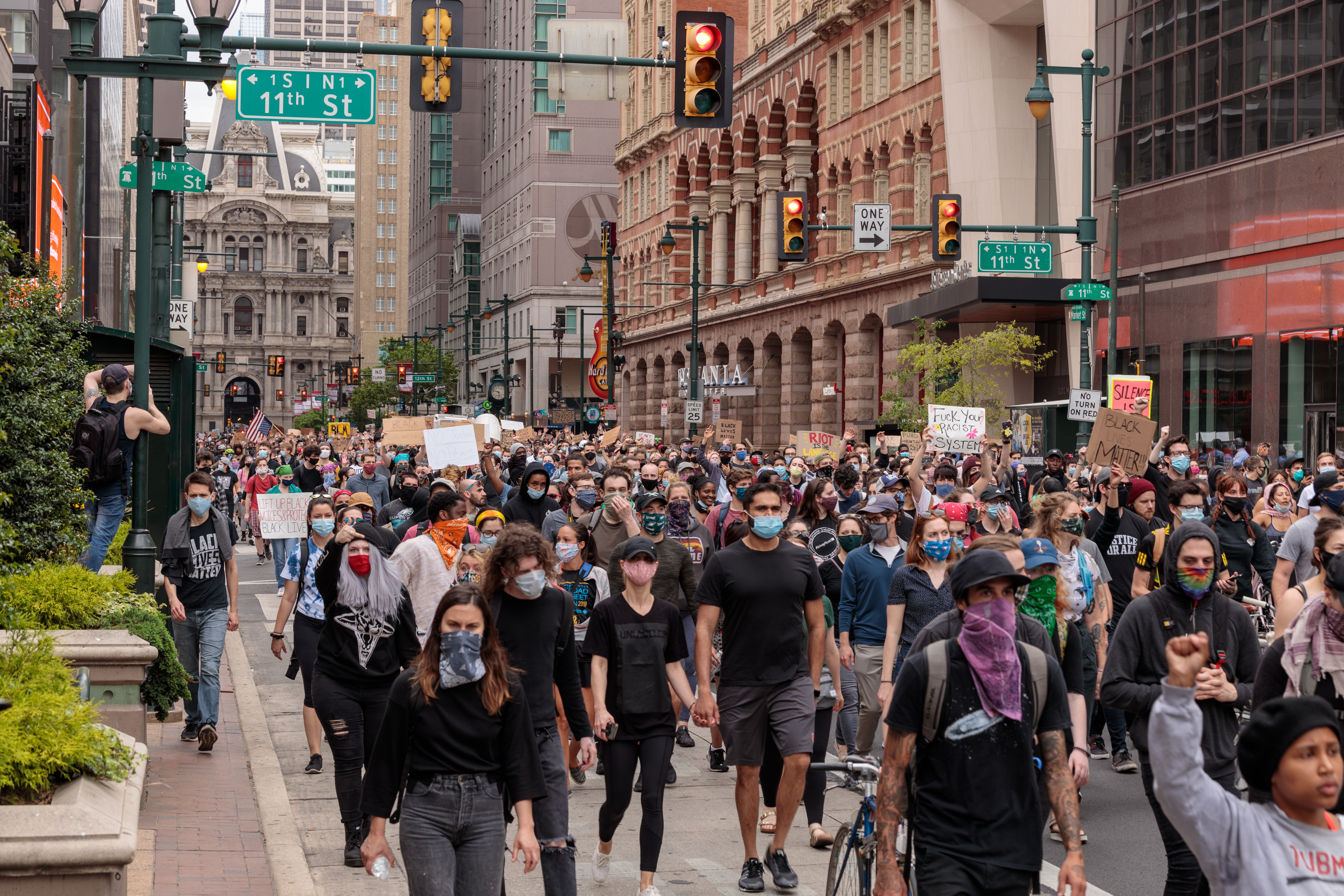
Protesters march along Market Street in Center City Philadelphia on June 2

Some streets in Center City Philadelphia were closed to traffic. Hundreds of people participated in peaceful protests through the streets of the city. In the Fishtown neighborhood, police officers hugged and knelt alongside protesters. A curfew went into effect at 8:30 p.m. on Tuesday night.

A looter was fatally shot by the owner of a gun shop, while trying to break into the store. Another looter was killed either in the explosion of an ATM from the explosive he placed on the sidewalk in front of the machine. This was one of at least 50 incidents of looters blowing up ATMs with dynamite, creating explosions that rocked several city neighborhoods May 30-June 3.

During a peaceful protest in Center City, a 20-year female protester's foot hit a bicycle being pushed by Police Staff Inspector Joseph Bologna. He then immediately grabbed the protester. She shouted that she had not touched Bologna's bicycle, to which he reacted by lunging at her and tackling her. Bologna was also involved in controversial incidents of May 31 and June 1.

=== June 3 ===
In the early morning, the statue of former Philadelphia mayor Frank Rizzo was removed from the steps of the Municipal Services Building and placed in secure storage at the Department of Public Property. Current mayor Jim Kenney commented, "The statue is a deplorable monument to racism, bigotry, and police brutality for members of the Black community, the LGBTQ community, and many others. The treatment of these communities under Mr. Rizzo's leadership was among the worst periods in Philadelphia's history." More peaceful protests occurred in the city on June 3, with streets in Center City Philadelphia closed and a curfew in effect at 6 p.m.

=== June 6 ===
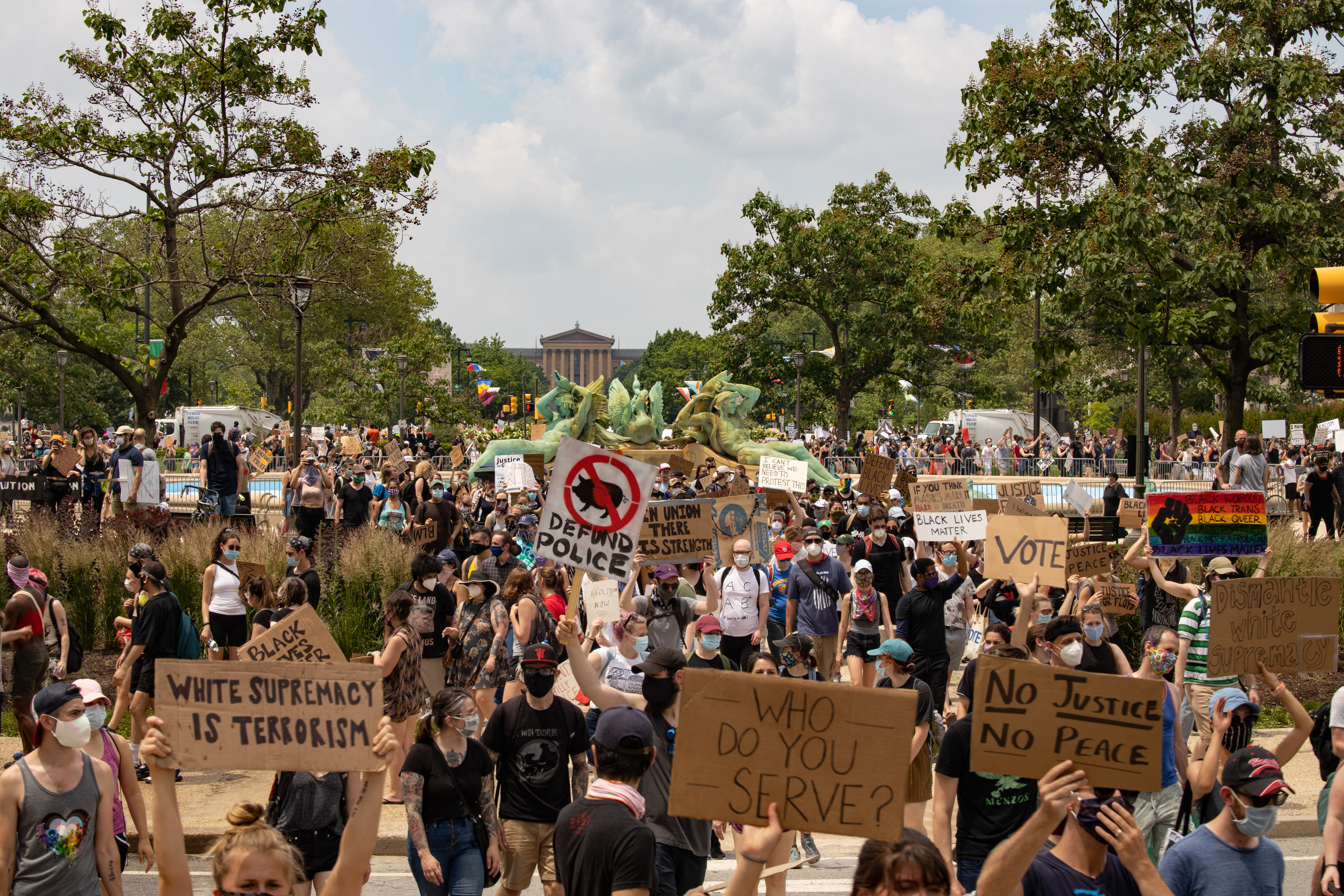
Protesters on June 6

About 66,000 people gathered in Center City Philadelphia to protest. Protesters started at the Philadelphia Museum of Art before marching along the Benjamin Franklin Parkway to Philadelphia City Hall. Demonstrators also gathered outside the African American Museum in Philadelphia. Mayor Kenney, along with Police Commissioner Danielle Outlaw, took a knee with protesters. In anticipation of the protests, streets in Center City Philadelphia along with Interstate 676 (Vine Street Expressway) were closed. An African-American couple who had already scheduled their wedding in the vicinity of the protest took their photos in the middle of the large crowd.

=== June 7 ===
A mural of former Police Commissioner and Mayor Frank Rizzo, located near 900 South 9th Street, in the Italian Market section of South Philadelphia, was painted over starting at 5:00 AM Sunday morning and finishing at about 6:00 AM. "We know that the removal of this mural does not erase painful memories and are deeply apologetic for the amount of grief it has caused. We believe this is a step in the right direction and hope to aid in healing our city through the power of thoughtful and inclusive public art," a spokesperson for Mural Arts, the nonprofit that maintains and creates murals around the city, said in a statement.

=== June 13 ===
A defund the police rally took place in Center City Philadelphia near the future headquarters of the Philadelphia Police Department. Several streets in Center City Philadelphia were closed along with Interstate 676 (Vine Street Expressway).

=== June 23 ===
At Broad Street and Oregon Avenue, in Marconi Plaza citizens rallied around Christopher Columbus statue to stop it from being taken away too. Then a second wave of violence broke out when a group of around 50 protesters met the armed group. The latter group was heard chanting "U.S.A" before a brawl ensued and a man from each side was detained.
