= Freedom (Frudakis) =

Sculpture by Zenos Frudakis in Philadelphia

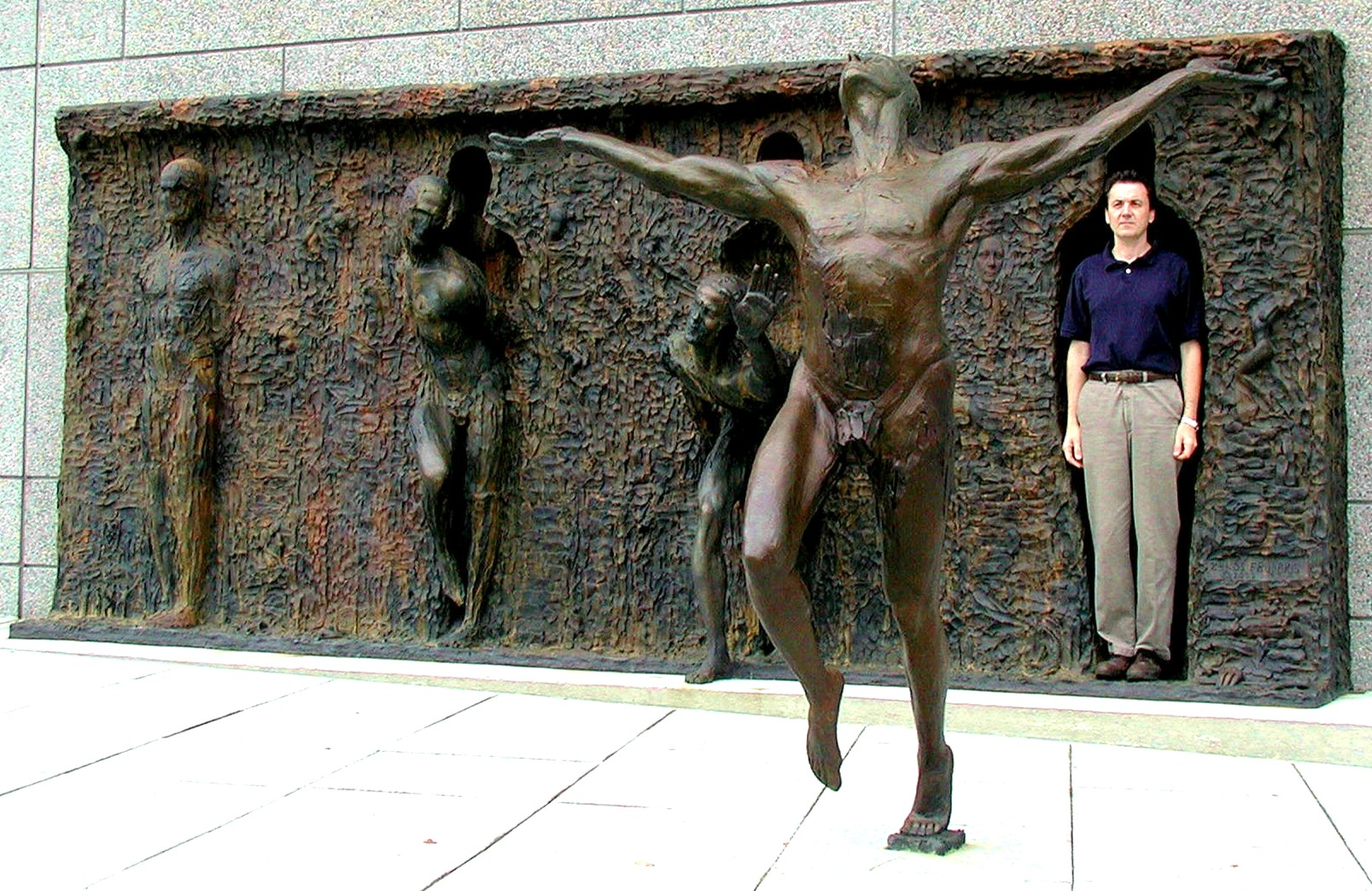
- Frudakis posing with the sculpture
- Interactive map of Freedom
- Location: Philadelphia, Pennsylvania, U.S.
- Coordinates: 39.95798°N 75.16602°W
- Designer: Zenos Frudakis
- Material: Bronze
- Length: 20 ft (6.1 m)
- Height: 8 ft (2.4 m)
- Weight: 7,000 pounds (3,200 kg)
- Completion date: 2000
- Opening date: June 18, 2001; 25 years ago
- Dedicated to: All forms of freedom
- Website: Artist's website

Freedom is a bronze public sculpture in the form of a large slab and a freestanding statue by American sculptor Zenos Frudakis, installed in 2000 outside the offices of GlaxoSmithKline in central Philadelphia, Pennsylvania. The sculpture invites viewers to pose for a photograph in an empty cavity.

== Background ==
The sculptor, Zenos Frudakis, wanted to create a sculpture centering around the idea of breaking free. (Note: Frudakis wrote: "I wanted to create a sculpture almost anyone, regardless of their background, could look at and instantly recognize that it is about the idea of struggling to break free. 22 This sculpture is about the struggle for achievement of freedom through the creative process.") The slab is said to represent freedom from all restrictions: mental, political, religious, and physical, and has been called a "visual metaphor for the process of transformation".

== Design ==
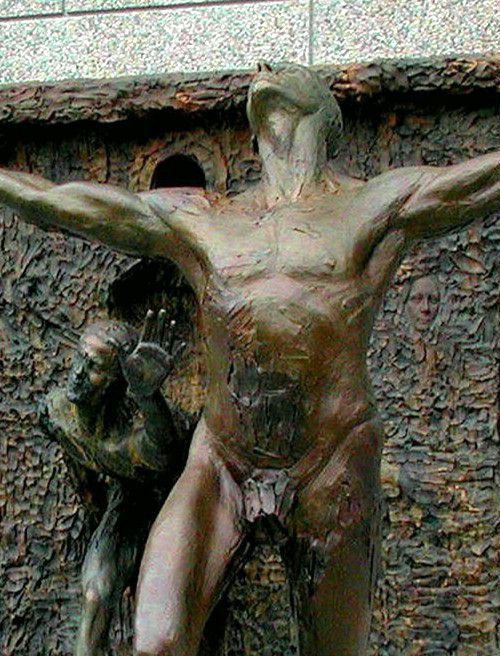
Detail of Freedom

The sculpture, completed in 2000 and dedicated on June 18, 2001, consists of a 20-by-8-foot-long (6.1 m × 2.4 m) bronze slab weighing 7,000 pounds (3,200 kg) and a freestanding bronze statue. It is installed at ground level on a wall outside the Philadelphia offices of GlaxoSmithKline on Vine Street.

Freedom centers around four human figures depicted in different stages of freeing themselves in the slab. The rightmost figure has broken free and stands away from the slab with outstretched arms. Frudakis left the inscription "stand here" in the cavity vacated by the figure as an invitation for viewers to pose for a photograph.

Frudakis cast his own face and his sculpting tools as part of the artwork, and included depictions of twenty-five people and a cat in the bronze.

== Reception ==
Freedom has been recognized as one of the best public art sculptures. Architectural Digest called it one of the "28 of the Most Fascinating Public Sculptures" in 2019.

Writing in The Independent in 2021, John Rentoul ranked the sculpture fifth on his top-ten list of best public artworks.
