= Matthias Baldwin Park =

Park in Philadelphia, Pennsylvania, United States

Coordinates: 39°57′42″N 75°10′09″W

Matthias Baldwin Park is a two-acre (0.81 ha) public park at 423 North 19th Street in Philadelphia, Pennsylvania.

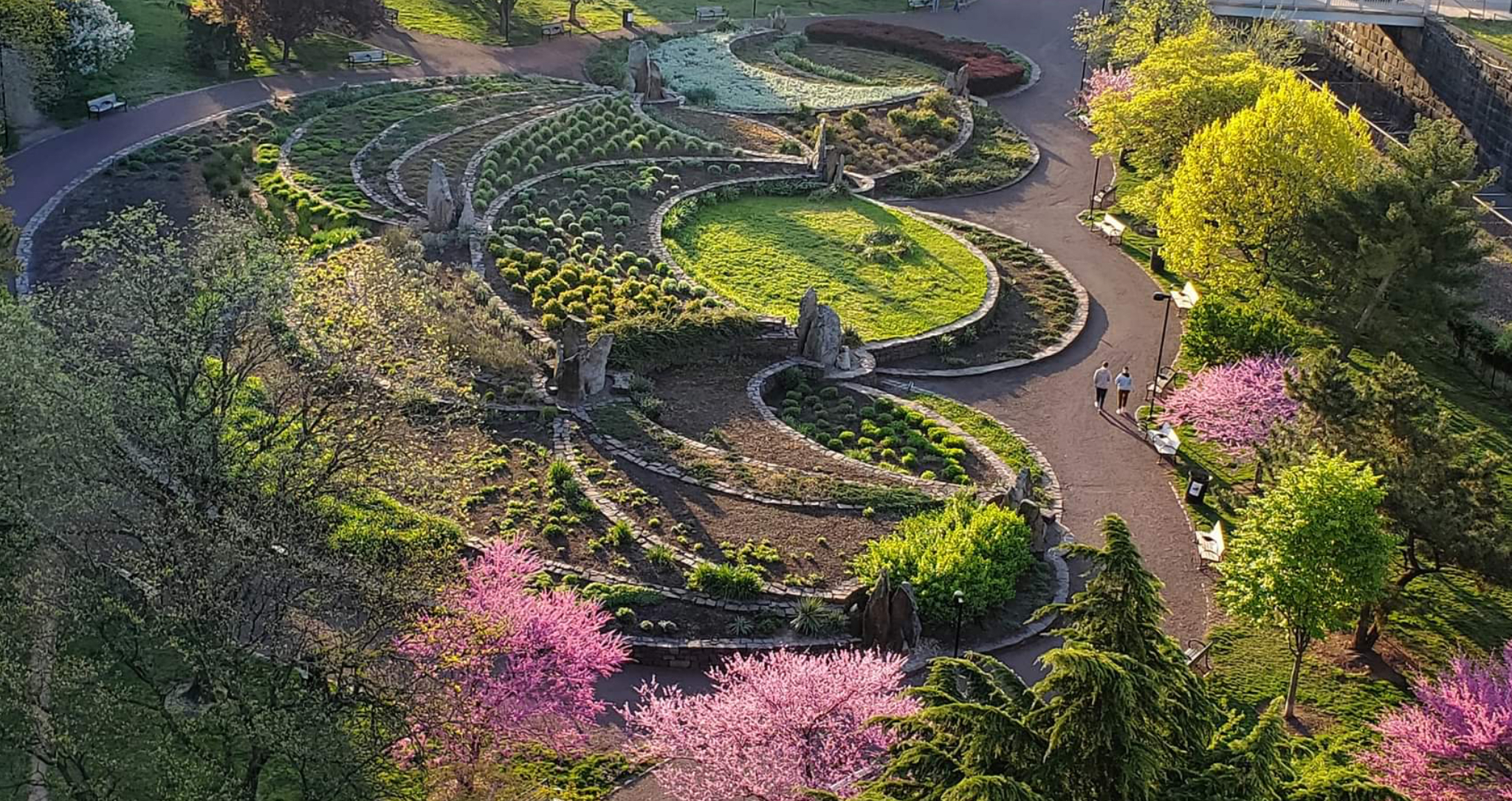
Matthias Baldwin Park, June 2021

In 1991, the park was dedicated as Franklin Town Park as part of the 50-acre development called Franklin Town. The Franklin Town Development Corporation was a private consortium which, along with City of Philadelphia officials, announced plans in 1971 to build a new "city-within-a-city" within ten years, in order to clear what they considered blight in a parcel just north of the commercial core of Philadelphia. The developers could earn a profit while the City tax base would increase. Eminent domain was threatened in order to remove the 600 inhabitants and business owners in the proposed development. The park was to be the apex of a new diagonal street called Franklin Town Boulevard and was to be the centerpiece of the development. By 1974 construction began but due to economic uncertainty in the 1970’s the project progressed in fits and starts, and still, 50 years later, is not completed.

The park itself was a Percent for Art requirement of the developers of Franklin Town. Landscape artist Athena Tacha was commissioned to design the park, and the final version was the art piece titled Connections, which is made up of a terraced set of planting beds surrounded by a level surface with paved pathways and fifty trees. The park is one of the over 150 parks in the Philadelphia Parks and Recreation system.

In 2009, many of the residents living in the neighborhood around the park had become disgusted by the many surface parking lots resulting from the demolition of their houses and businesses in the name of the desultory Franklin Town development. They petitioned the City to change the name of the park to Matthias Baldwin Park, which was officially done in 2011. For the same reason, the name of the neighborhood on the community bulletin board Nextdoor was changed from Franklin Town to Baldwin Park in 2019. Matthias W. Baldwin was a locomotive builder whose factories occupied most of the neighborhood from 1835 through 1928, at one time being the largest locomotive builder in the world. A State of Pennsylvania historical marker was placed at the northwest corner of the park in 2009 commemorating the location of the Baldwin Locomotive Works.

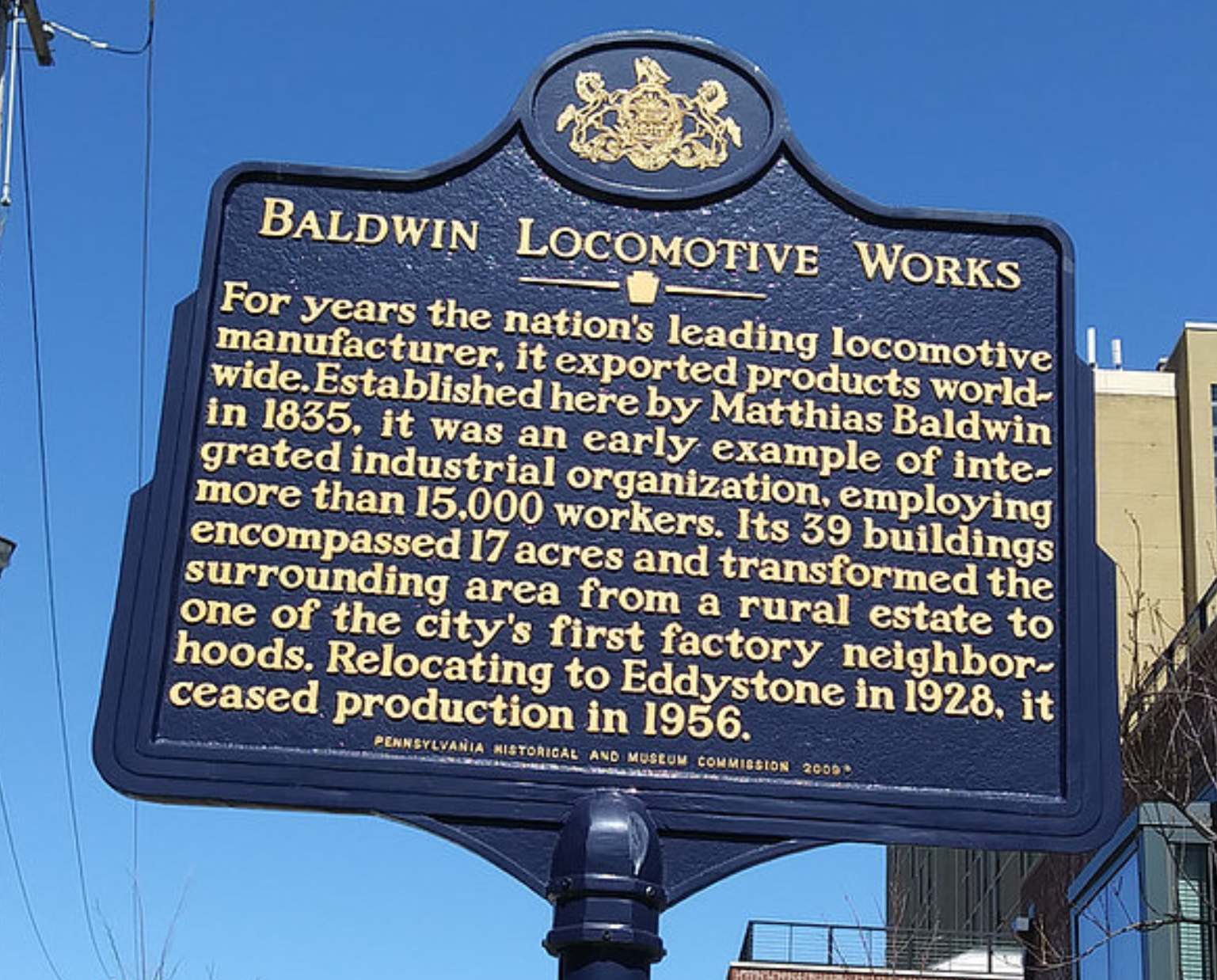
Pennsylvania State Historical Marker for the Baldwin Locomotive Works, placed at northwest corner of Matthias Baldwin Park

The Friends of Matthias Baldwin Park, a non-profit volunteer group committed to maintaining and preserving the park, became involved in a national controversy in June of 2020. During protests after the murder of George Floyd, a statue of Matthias W. Baldwin at Philadelphia City Hall was defaced with the words "murderer" and "colonizer." Members of the Friends group were sought out for comments and educated a national audience on the fact that Baldwin was in fact an abolitionist, a defender of Black franchise, a donor for schools for Blacks, and a workforce integrator, all of which caused him to lose business in Southern states in the decades preceding the Civil War. Liberal and especially conservative news outlets caricatured the protestors as ignorant of history.
