= Matthias W. Baldwin =

American inventor, early abolitionist, and machinery manufacturer

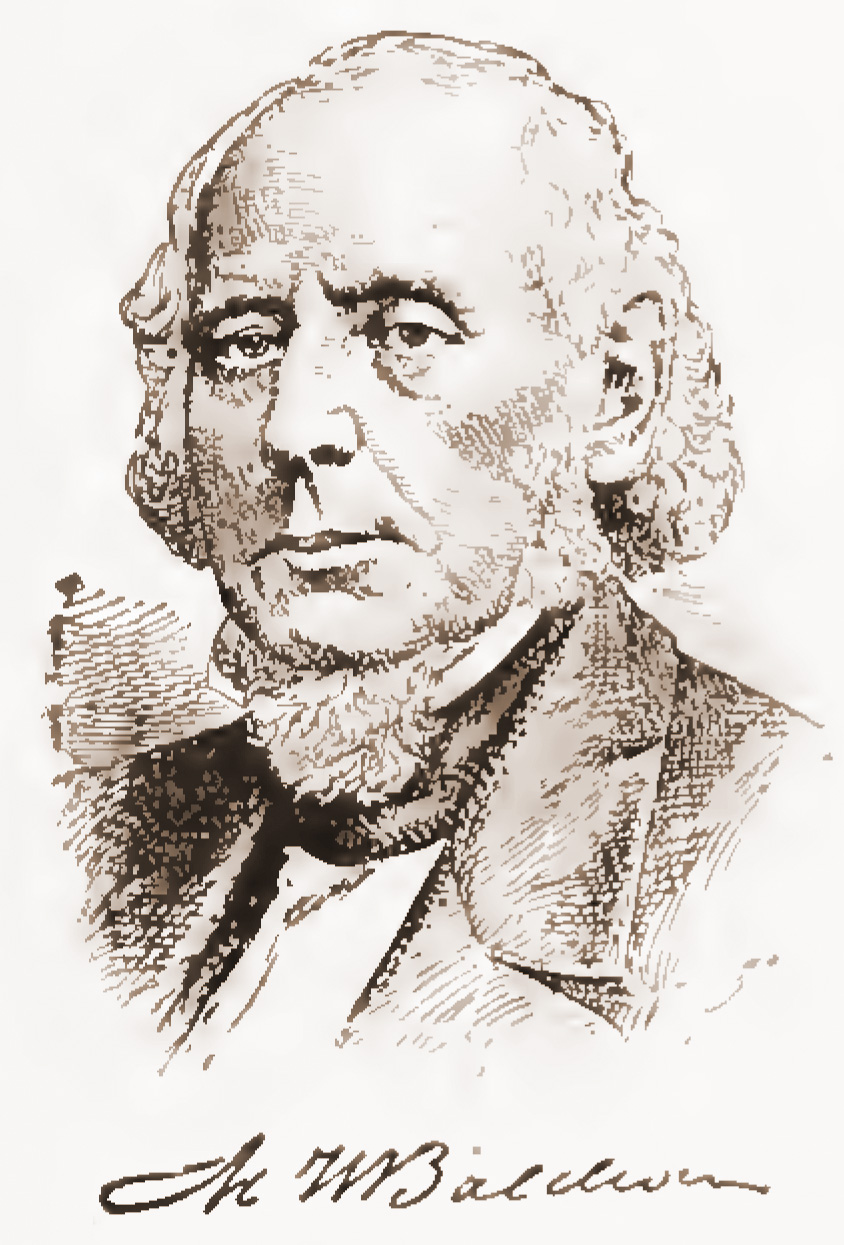
- Born: December 10, 1795; Elizabethtown, New Jersey, U.S.
- Died: September 7, 1866 (aged 70); Philadelphia, Pennsylvania, U.S.
- Resting place: Laurel Hill Cemetery, Philadelphia, Pennsylvania, U.S.
- Occupations: Inventor, machinery manufacturer

Matthias William Baldwin (December 10, 1795 – September 7, 1866) was an American inventor and machinery manufacturer, specializing in the production of steam locomotives. Baldwin's small machine shop, established in 1825, grew to become Baldwin Locomotive Works, one of the largest and most successful locomotive manufacturing firms in the United States. The most famous of the early locomotives were Old Ironsides, built by Matthias Baldwin in 1832. Baldwin was also a strong advocate of abolitionism.

== Early years ==
Matthias W. Baldwin was born December 10, 1795, in Elizabethtown, New Jersey. He was the youngest of five children born to a prosperous carriage builder named William Baldwin. Following his father's death in 1799, executors of the Baldwin estate proved unequal to the task, however, and his widow and children were left in difficult financial circumstances owing to their poor management.

Although he received a very satisfactory common school education, Baldwin's inclination and aptitude related to mechanical tinkering from an early age. Toys would be deconstructed and reassembled to learn their inner workings and spare bits and pieces of machinery would be put to new use in a makeshift workshop inside his mother's home.

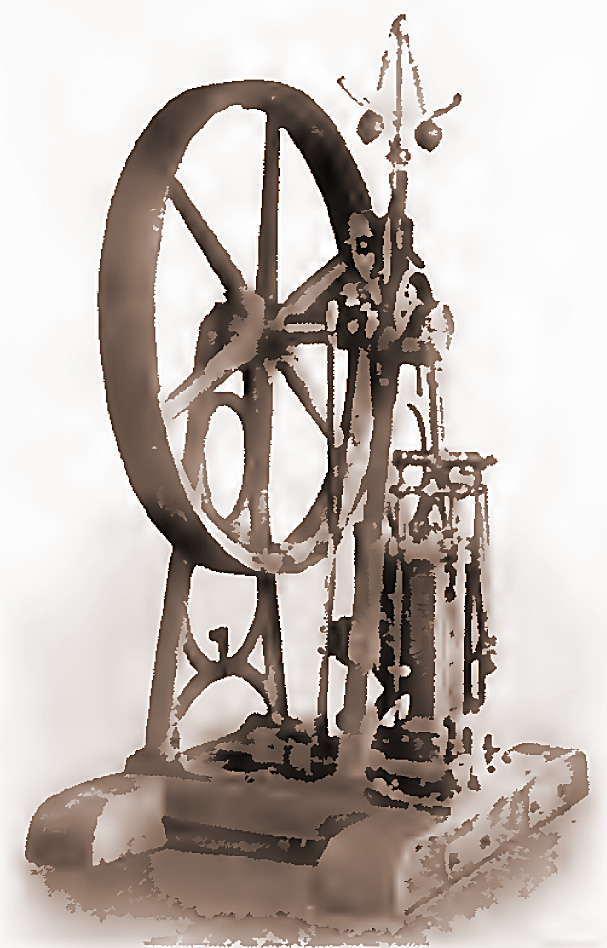
Baldwin's first stationary steam engine, built in 1828.

In 1811 the 16-year-old Baldwin was made an apprentice jewelry maker to the Woolworth Brothers of Frankford, Pennsylvania (now part of the City of Philadelphia). Apprenticeship in these days was a virtually coercive relationship marked by long hours of labor and miserable compensation. In 1817, shortly before the fixed term of his indenture was completed, Baldwin moved together with his mother to Philadelphia. There the budding jewelry maker was employed by the firm of Fletcher & Gardner, one of the leading jewelry manufacturers of the city.

Baldwin proved to be a valuable journeyman employee over the next two years. In 1819 Baldwin quit Fletcher & Gardner and began to work as an independent silversmith. Baldwin quickly proved himself a skilled and innovative craftsman and developed a revolutionary new technique for making gold plate. Rather than the painstaking application of gold leaf to base metal, Baldwin's method of manufacture made use of soldering a piece of gold to the base metal and rolling the two together until the requisite thickness was attained. Baldwin's technique came to gain wide acceptance as the industry standard although, unfortunately for him, it was never protected through the acquisition of a patent.

== Machinery maker ==
During the middle 1820s demand for jewelry and silverware suddenly experienced a dramatic decline, forcing Baldwin to search for a new occupation. In 1825, Baldwin went into partnership with a machinist named David Mason to form a company which made industrial equipment for printers and bookbinders: tools, dies, and machines that had previously been exclusively imported from Europe. The pair became involved in the manufacture of printing cylinders and perfected an improved process for the etching of steel plates.

The needs of the growing firm demanded both larger quarters and an improved power source. In 1828 Baldwin devised and constructed his first steam engine, a stationary device that produced 5 horsepower of output and remained in use in the shop for four decades. Baldwin's engine was not only the most powerful of its day but also incorporated mechanical innovation to power rotary motion, which ultimately came to have application in transport, including marine engine design. The original engine still survives in the Smithsonian Institution in Washington, DC.

Demand for steam engines proved to be great and Baldwin and Mason quickly supplanted their printing machinery business with an engine-making division. Within a decade the firm would be regarded as the top engine maker in the country.

== Locomotive builder ==
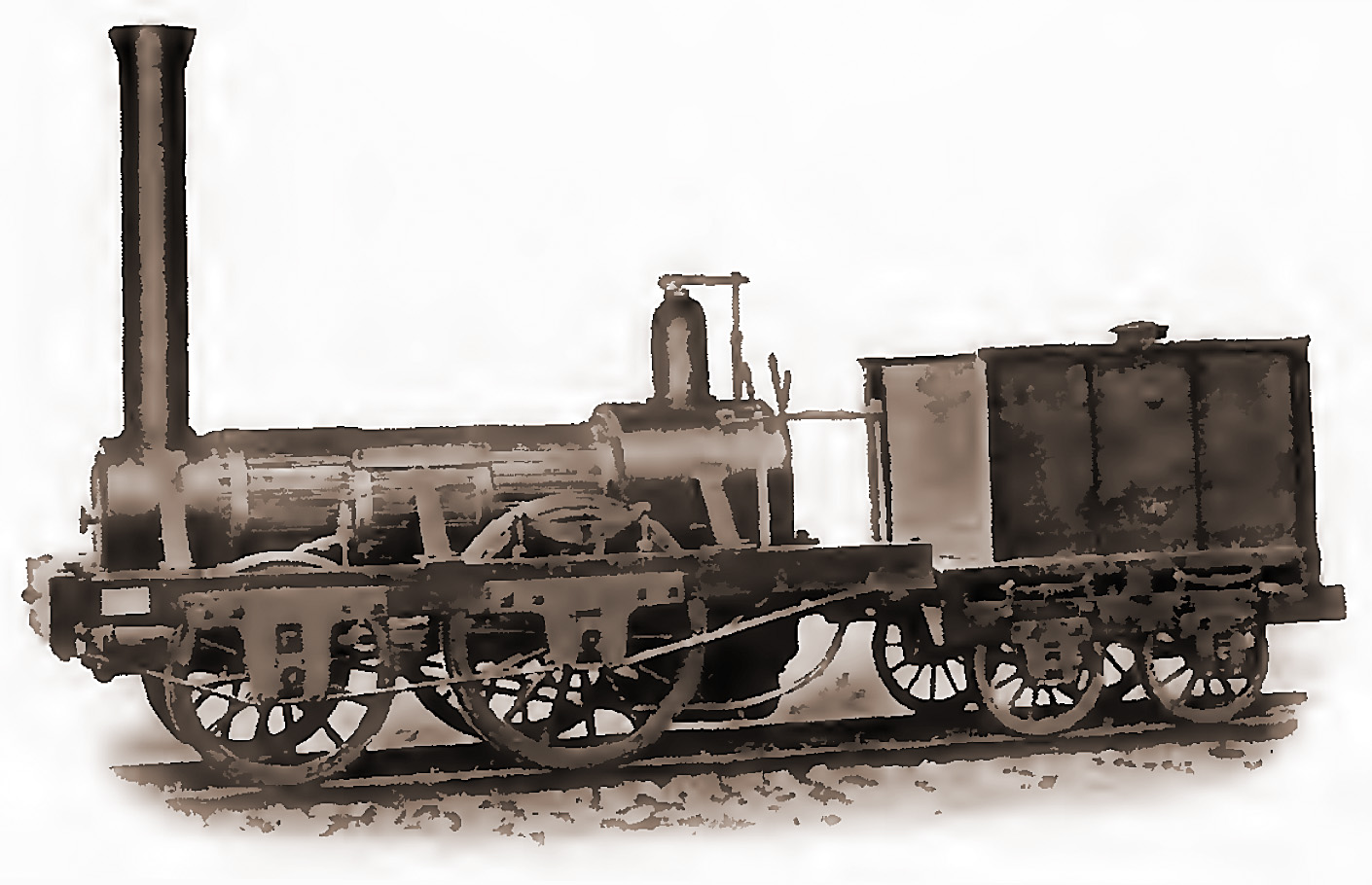
Baldwin's Old Ironsides engine, manufactured in 1832.

Baldwin put his knowledge of stationary steam engines to new use in 1831 when he constructed his first experimental steam locomotive. Based on designs first shown at the Rainhill Trials in England, Baldwin's prototype was a small demonstration engine that was displayed at Peale's Philadelphia City Museum. The engine was strong enough to pull a few cars that carried four passengers each. This locomotive was unusual for the time in that it burned coal, which was available locally, instead of wood.

The next year Baldwin built his first commissioned steam locomotive for the fledgling Philadelphia, Germantown & Norristown Railroad. This engine, nicknamed Old Ironsides, traveled at the rate of only 1 mile per hour (1.6 km/h) in initial trials made on November 23, 1832, but the machine was later refined and improved so that a peak speed of 28 mph (45 km/h) was attained. It weighed over 5 tons, with 54 in (1,400 mm) diameter rear wheels, 9.5 in (240 mm) cylinders with 18 in (460 mm) stroke and a 30 in (760 mm) diameter boiler which took 20 minutes to raise steam. This locomotive was a 2-2-0 (Whyte notation) type, meaning it had one unpowered leading axle and one powered driving axle. Although contracted for $4,000, owing to performance shortcomings a compromise price of $3,500 (equal to $116,767 today) between the railroad and the budding Baldwin Locomotive Works was ultimately agreed upon and received.

Baldwin was issued U.S. patent 54 "Art of managing and supplying fire for generating steam in locomotive-engines" in 1836. As the text of the patent explained "The intention of this new mode of managing the fire is to enable me, at each water station, or any convenient place to have a clear coal fire waiting the arrival of the engine so that the grate or fire-place which has been in use, may be detached or slid out, and that containing the clear fire, made to occupy its place."

== Personal life ==
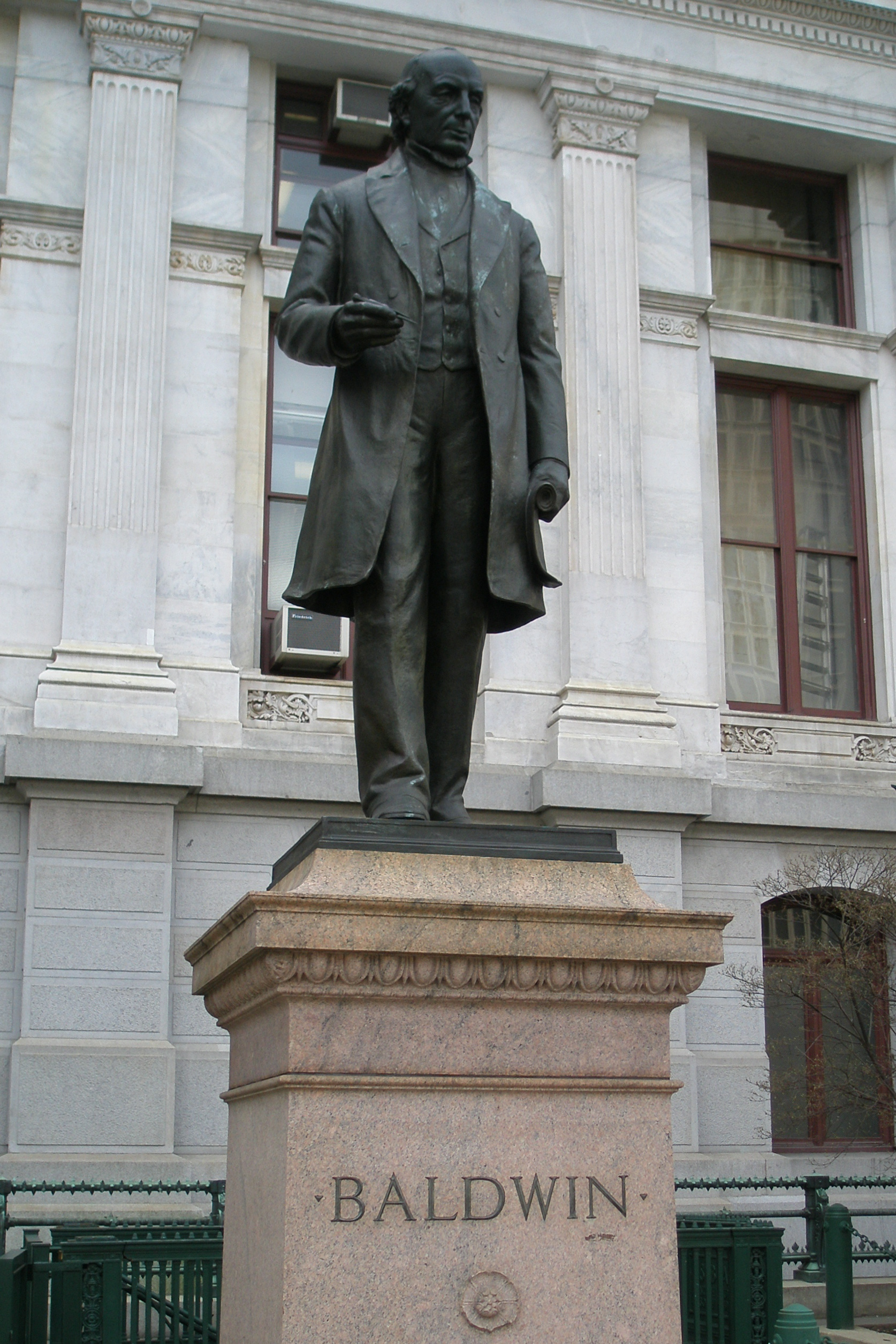
A statue of Baldwin in front of Philadelphia City Hall.

Baldwin was a devout member of the Presbyterian Church and a consistent donor to religious and secular charitable causes throughout his life. In 1824 he was a founder of the Franklin Institute in Philadelphia. He was elected to the American Philosophical Society in 1833.

In 1835, he donated money to establish a school for African-American children in Philadelphia and continued to pay the teachers' salaries out of his own pocket for years thereafter. Baldwin was an outspoken supporter for the abolition of slavery in the United States, a position that was used against him and his firm by competitors eager to sell locomotives to railroads based in the slaveholding South.

Baldwin was a member of the 1837 Pennsylvania Constitutional Convention and emerged as a defender of voting rights for the state's black male citizens.

Baldwin married a distant cousin in 1827, Sarah C. Baldwin. Together, they had three children.

One of his last philanthropic efforts was the donation of 10% of his company's income to the Civil War Christian Mission in the early 1860s.

== Death and legacy ==
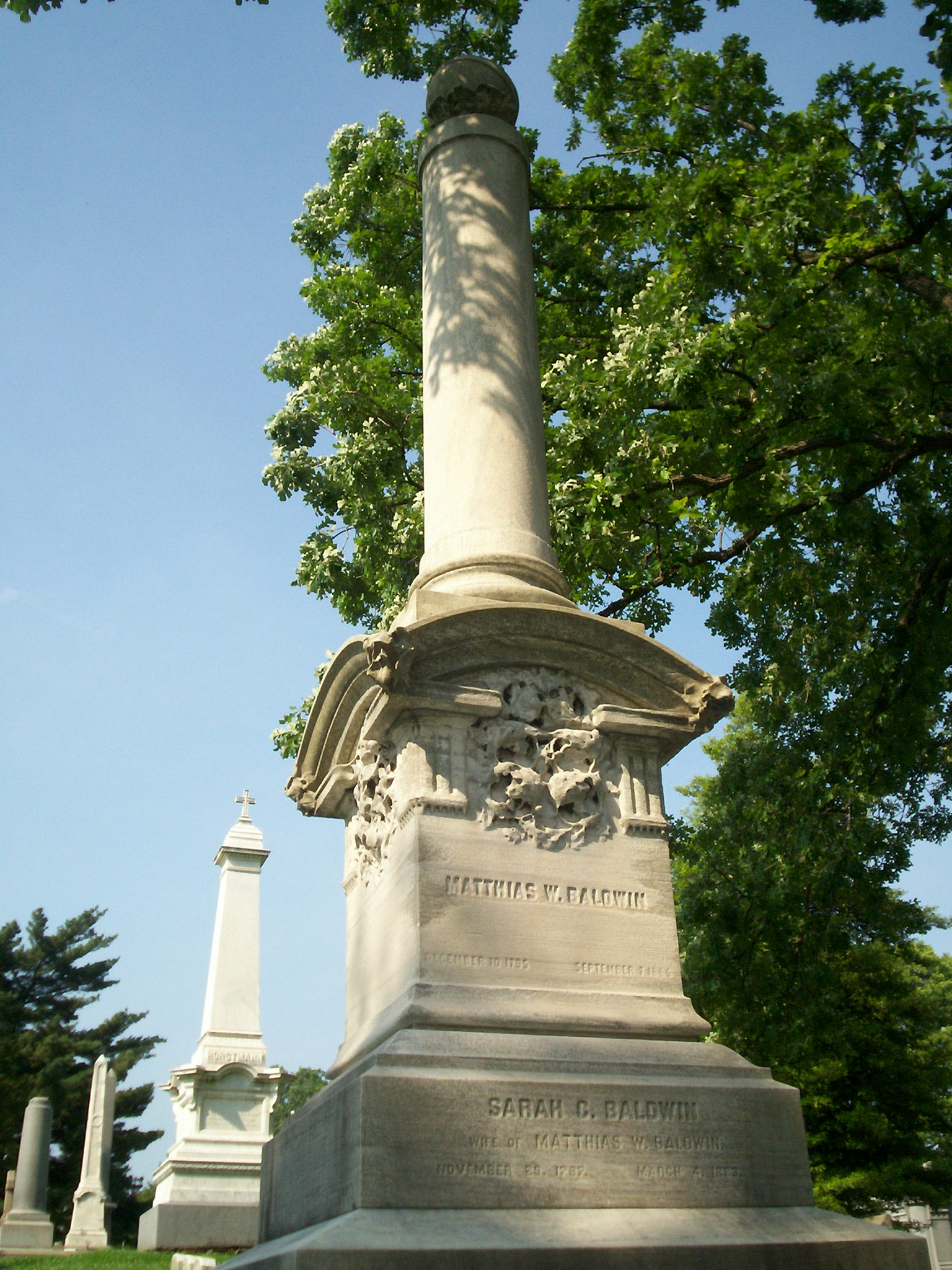
Matthias Baldwin memorial in Laurel Hill Cemetery

Baldwin died on September 7, 1866, at his country home in Wissinoming, and was interred at Laurel Hill Cemetery in Philadelphia.

At the time of its founder's death, the Baldwin Locomotive Works had produced some 1,500 steam locomotives. The company ultimately produced a total of some 75,000 steam locomotive engines, before it terminated production in 1956.

A statue of Baldwin was first erected in Philadelphia in 1906, and moved in front of Philadelphia City Hall in 1936. In late May 2020, it was briefly defaced with the words "colonizer" and "murderer", and was cleaned soon afterward. The incident increased interest in Baldwin's legacy, according to the president of the volunteer group Friends of Matthias Baldwin Park.

== See also ==
- Baldwin Locomotive Works
