= Statue of Matthias W. Baldwin =

Statue in Philadelphia, Pennsylvania

Matthias William Baldwin
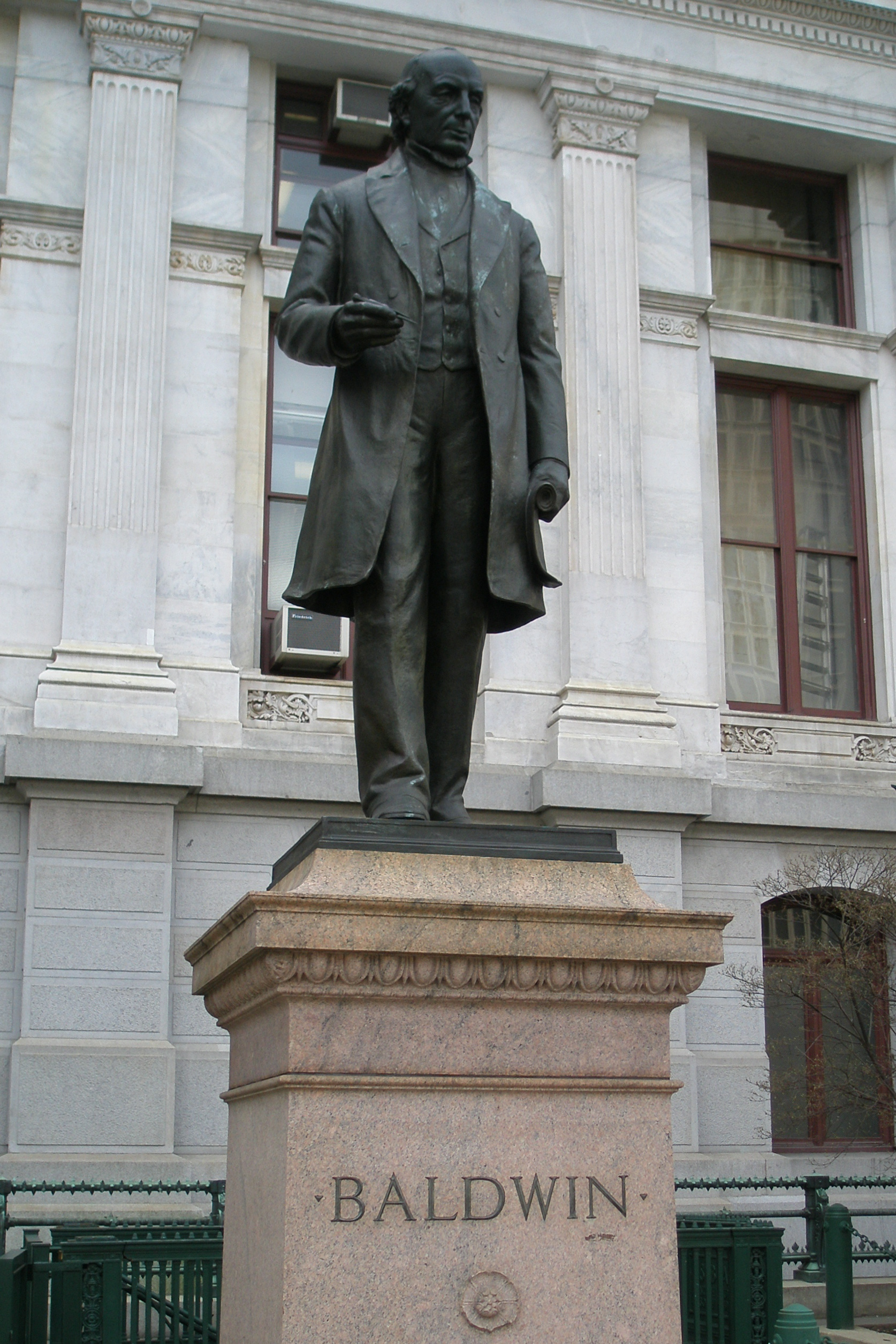
- The statue in 2007
- Location: Philadelphia City Hall, Philadelphia, Pennsylvania, United States
- Coordinates: 39°57′11″N 75°9′50″W
- Designer: Herbert Adams
- Type: Statue
- Material: Bronze; Pink granite
- Length: 58 inches (150 cm)
- Width: 58 inches (150 cm)
- Height: 204 inches (520 cm)
- Completion date: 1905
- Dedicated date: June 2, 1906
- Dedicated to: Matthias W. Baldwin

Matthias William Baldwin is a monument consisting of a bronze sculpture of philanthropist and industrialist Matthias W. Baldwin atop a pink granite pedestal located outside Philadelphia City Hall in Philadelphia, Pennsylvania, United States. The statue was designed by sculptor Herbert Adams and dedicated in 1906.

Baldwin was an early developer of steam locomotives in the United States during the early 19th century. His company, the Baldwin Locomotive Works, was founded in Philadelphia and was one of the largest locomotive manufacturers in the world during the 1800s. Baldwin was also a philanthropist who donated to the Franklin Institute and supported causes intended to help African Americans, including suffrage and abolitionism. He died in 1866. Efforts to erect a statue in his honor began in the early 1900s, with Philadelphia's city government passing an ordinance allowing the Fairmount Park Art Association to erect a statue on public property near the locomotive works. The statue itself was a gift from the company to the city, and it was completed by Adams in 1905. It was officially dedicated on June 2, 1906, in a ceremony attended by Philadelphia Mayor John Weaver and other politicians and businessmen.

In 1921, the statue was relocated to the north property of the city hall, and, following another move in 1936, the statue has stood near Broad and Market Street. In 2020, the statue, along with several other monuments in the city, was vandalized during the George Floyd protests in Philadelphia.

== History ==
=== Background ===
Matthias W. Baldwin was an American manufacturer and inventor who worked in Philadelphia during the 1800s. While working at a manufacturing firm, he became interested in steam engine technology and, in 1832, he designed and built one of the first successful American steam locomotives, which was nicknamed Old Ironsides. Following this, his company, the Baldwin Locomotive Works, became one of the world's largest locomotive manufacturers. Baldwin was also a philanthropist who helped finance the construction of several churches in the city and donated to the Franklin Institute to promote mechanical arts. Baldwin was also an proponent of abolitionism and an advocate for increased rights for African Americans, such as the right to vote, and in 1835, he established a school in Philadelphia for African American children. He died in 1866.

=== Creation ===
In April 1903, the Committee on City Property of the government of Philadelphia reported positively on a bill that would allow the Fairmount Park Art Association to erect a statue of Baldwin on Spring Garden Street, just east of its intersection with Broad Street, which would be owned by the city. (Note: The Fairmount Park Art Association, now known as the Association for Public Art, is a nonprofit group that commissions and administers public art on behalf of the city of Philadelphia.) The statue would be located in a small park at the intersection, facing the office building of the Baldwin Locomotive Works. In May, the Select Council of the City of Philadelphia voted unanimously in favor of the bill, which was signed into law by Philadelphia Mayor John Weaver on June 15. The statue was to be donated to the Fairmount Park Art Association by the firm of Burnham, Williams & Company, which was the current operators of the Baldwin Locomotive Works. The firm commissioned Herbert Adams, a sculptor based out of New York City, to design the statue, which was completed and donated to the art association in 1905. On April 17, 1906, the statue was hoisted onto a pedestal at the park by several men, selected from a group of 50 who traced their employment at the locomotive works back to before Baldwin's death. (Note: Sources vary on the exact number of employees involved in the hoisting of the statue onto the pedestal. a 1906 article in Railway and Locomotive Engineering magazine states that eight employees were involved, while an article in American Machinist published the same year states that the statue was lifted "by nine gray-haired master machinists".)

=== Dedication ===
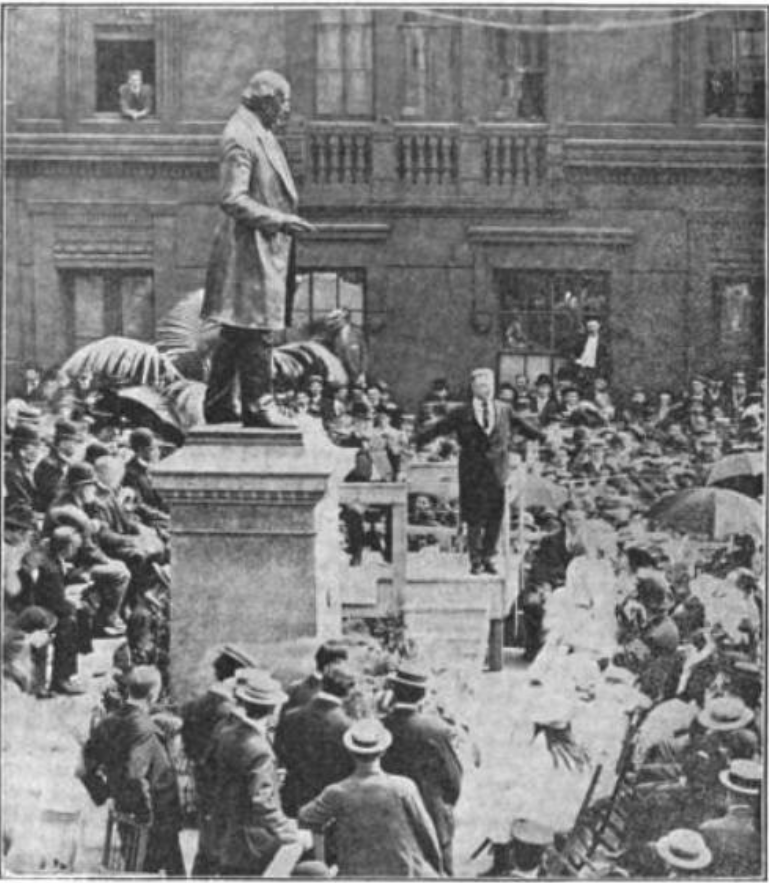
The statue's dedication on June 2, 1906

The statue was formally dedicated on June 2, 1906, a Saturday, in a ceremony organized by the art association. Presiding over the ceremony was William P. Hensey, the head of the locomotive works, who introduced the speakers, and the statue was officially unveiled by F. T. Sulley-Darley, a daughter of Baldwin. The statue was given to the city by John A. Converse, an associate of the business firm, who gave a speech honoring Baldwin in which he quoted John Milton, saying, "Peace hath her victories no less renowned than war". The statue was accepted by Mayor Weaver on behalf of the city, who also gave a speech honoring Baldwin and his contributions to the city. Leslie W. Miller, the secretary of the Fairmount Park Art Association, also spoke at the ceremony, and after all of the speeches had concluded, George Burnham, an 80-year-old employee of the works who had been working there since 1835, was introduced to the audience. Following the dedication, the locomotive works issued a commemorative 20-page pamphlet on the ceremony that included multiple images of the sculpture and celebrations and transcripts of all speeches given.

=== Later history ===
In 1921, the statue was relocated to the northwest corner of Philadelphia City Hall property. A second move occurred in 1936, and today the statue is located at City Hall's North Plaza, near Broad Street and Market Street.

Around June 10, 2020, (Note: An exact date of June 10 is given in a historical book published in 2021. However, a 2020 article from the National Review explicitly states in a correction that the vandalism did not happen on June 10.) during the George Floyd protests in Philadelphia, the statue was defaced with paint, with the words "colonizer" and "murderer" spray painted on its pedestal. The statue was one of several works of public art vandalized during the protests, which included the statue of Frank Rizzo, also located outside of the city hall, and a monument to soldiers and sailors who fought in the Union Army during the American Civil War. Reporting on the vandalism, multiple commentators noted Baldwin's support for civil rights for African Americans.

== Design ==
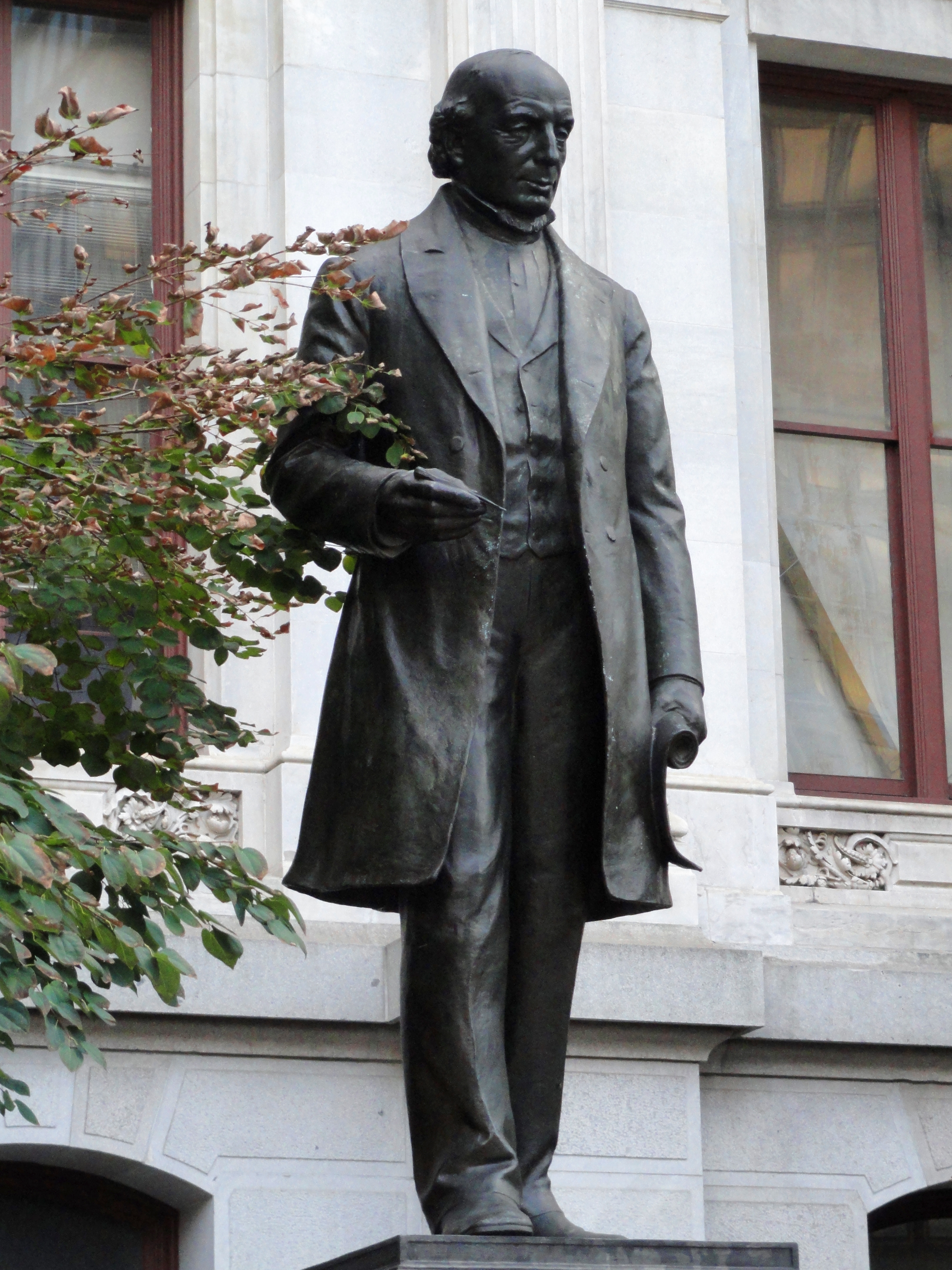
Closeup of the statue

The monument consists of a bronze statue of Baldwin atop a pedestal made of pink granite. The statue depicts Baldwin in a standing position, wearing a shirt, vest, and double-breasted coat. In his right hand, he holds a compass, while in his left hand, he is holding a scroll with designs for a locomotive. The statue measures approximately 96 inches (240 cm) tall and has a square base with side measurements of 30 inches (76 cm). The pedestal is approximately 9 feet (2.7 m) and has a square base with measurements of 58 inches (150 cm). Inscribed on the pedestal is the word "BALDWIN" on the front and the phrase "MATTHIAS WILLIAM BALDWIN/FOVNDER OF THE BALDWIN LOCOMOTIVE WORKS/MDCCXCV/-MDCCCLXVI/HIS SKILL IN THE MECHANICAL/ARTS HIS FAITHFVL DISCHARGE/OF THE DVTIES OF CITIZENSHIP/HIS BROAD PHILANTHROPY AND VNFAILING BENEVOLENCES; AND HIS DEVOTION TO ALL CHRISTIAN WORK/PLACED HIM FOREMOST/AMONG THE MAKERS OF PHILADELPHIA" on the back. The entire monument rests on a platform with side measurements of 95 inches (240 cm).

== See also ==
- List of public art in Philadelphia
- Matthias Baldwin Park

== Sources ==
- "Statue of Matthias W. Baldwin". American Engineer and Railroad Journal: 410. October 1906.
- "The Baldwin Statue in Philadelphia—Unveiling of a Fine Bronze to the Founder of the Baldwin Locomotive Works". American Machinist. New York City: 654. November 15, 1906.
- "Matthias William Baldwin". Association for Public Art. Archived from the original on May 19, 2023.
- Brandt, Francis Burke; Gummere, Henry Volkmar (1925). Byways and Boulevards in and about Historic Philadelphia. Philadelphia: Corn Exchange National Bank.
- Brenner, Roslyn F. (1987). Philadelphia's Outdoor Art: A Walking Tour. Philadelphia: Camino Books. ISBN 978-0-940159-00-6.
- Evans, Zachary (June 11, 2020). "Park Volunteer Outraged over Vandalism of Philadelphia Abolitionist Statue: 'He Was BLM Before There Was A Slogan'". National Review. Archived from the original on May 29, 2023.
- Forty-first Annual Report of the Board of Trustees. Proceedings of the Forty-first Annual Meeting, and the List of Members. Fairmount Park Art Association (49 ed.). Philadelphia. 1913.
- Ferree, Barr, ed. (1907). Year Book of the Pennsylvania Society. New York City: The Pennsylvania Society.
- Journal of Select Council of the City of Philadelphia. From April 6th, 1903, to Sept. 30th, 1903. With an Appendix. Vol. I. Philadelphia: George F. Lasher. 1903.
- McLain, Frank D., ed. (May 25, 1906a). "Matthias W. Baldwin Statue Unveiling". Railway World. L (21). Philadelphia: Railway World Publishing Co.: 448.
- McLain, Frank D., ed. (June 8, 1906b). "Baldwin Statue Unveiled". Railway World. L (23). Philadelphia: Railway World Publishing Co.: 476.
- Ordinances of the City of Philadelphia from January 1, to December 31, 1903, and Opinions of the City Solicitor. Philadelphia: Dunlap Printing Co. 1904.
- "Association for Public Art". Pew Center for Arts & Heritage. May 20, 2020. Archived from the original on March 25, 2023.
- "Statue of Baldwin". Railway and Locomotive Engineering. XIX (7). New York City: Angus Sinclair Co.: 305–306 July 1906.
- "Matthias William Baldwin (1795–1866), (sculpture)". Smithsonian Institution Research Information System. Archived from the original on July 16, 2023.
- Tornoe, Rob (June 12, 2020). "Photos of defaced statue of Philly abolitionist Matthias Baldwin go viral". The Philadelphia Inquirer. Archived from the original on May 24, 2023.
- Wilson, John K. (2021). "Art, Censorship, and the Battles over Public Spaces". In Jovanovic, Spoma (ed.). Expression in Contested Public Spaces: Free Speech and Civic Engagement. Lanham, Maryland: Lexington Books. pp. 149–166. ISBN 978-1-7936-3094-0.
