= Herbert Adams (sculptor) =

American sculptor (1858–1945)

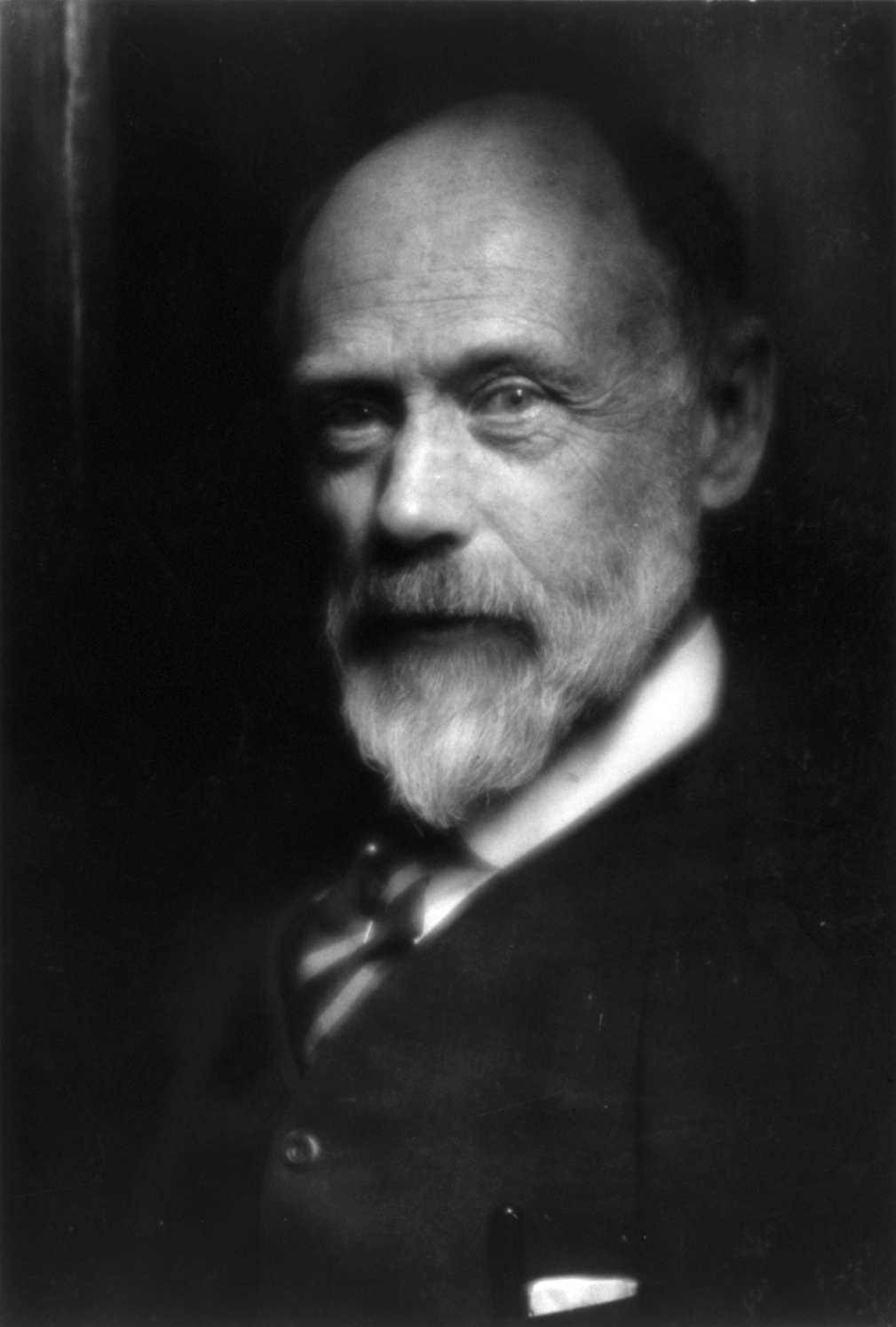
- Adams in 1918
- Born: January 28, 1858; West Concord, Vermont
- Died: May 21, 1945 (aged 87); New York City
- Known for: Sculpture
- Spouse: Adeline Valentine Pond Adams

Samuel Herbert Adams (January 28, 1858 – May 21, 1945) was an American sculptor.

== Biography ==
Herbert Adams was born in 1858 at West Concord, Vermont, son of machinist and patternmaker Samuel Minot Adams and Nancy Powers. In 1863, at the age of five, he moved to Fitchburg, Massachusetts, so his father could take a job at the Putnam Machine Co. His family purchased a home on 26 Chestnut Street. He was educated in the public schools of Fitchburg and Worcester, and at the Massachusetts Institute of Technology. He was influenced by Fitchburg's first Art teacher, Louise Haskell, to pursue a career in Art. He studied art at the Massachusetts Normal Art School in Boston and got a teaching certificate. Herbert Adams taught Art in the Fitchburg public schools from 1878 to 1882, but left Fitchburg for Paris France in 1885 to pursue his interest in sculpture. He was educated at the Massachusetts Normal Art School enrolling in 1877 at 18 years of age, and from 1885 to 1890 he was a pupil of Antonin Mercié in Paris.

In 1889 Rodney Wallace, James Phillips, and Henry Willis donated money for an ornamental fountain to grace the Upper Common of Fitchburg, MA and the City accepted the idea. This 26 foot in diameter granite and bronze fountain depicting two playful boys and a family of turtles was the first public commission awarded to Adams and was created in his Paris studio. This was the first, large sculpture, done in the "lost-wax" process, brought to America. During Adams lifetime he completed over 200 major public works of art, and is considered to be one of the most important American sculptors.

He opened a studio in New York city, and became a member of the National Academy of Design, the Society of American Artists, the National Sculpture Society and of the Architectural League. In 1890-1898 he was an instructor in the art school of Pratt Institute, Brooklyn, New York. He was elected into the National Academy of Design in 1898, and in 1906 was elected vice-president of the National Academy of Design, New York. Adams later served as President from 1917 to 1920. He experimented successfully with some polychrome busts and tinted marbles, notably in the Rabbi's Daughter (1894), and a portrait of the actress Julia Marlowe (1898). He was at his best in his portrait busts of women, the best example being the study, completed in 1887, of Miss Adeline Valentine Pond of Auburndale, Massachusetts, whom he married in 1889.

He was a member of the U.S. Commission of Fine Arts from 1915 to 1920, serving as vice chairman from 1918 to 1920.

Adams died in New York City in 1945.

Works by Adams are held by numerous American museums, including the National Gallery of Art in Washington, DC and the Metropolitan Museum of Art in New York City.

== Selected works ==
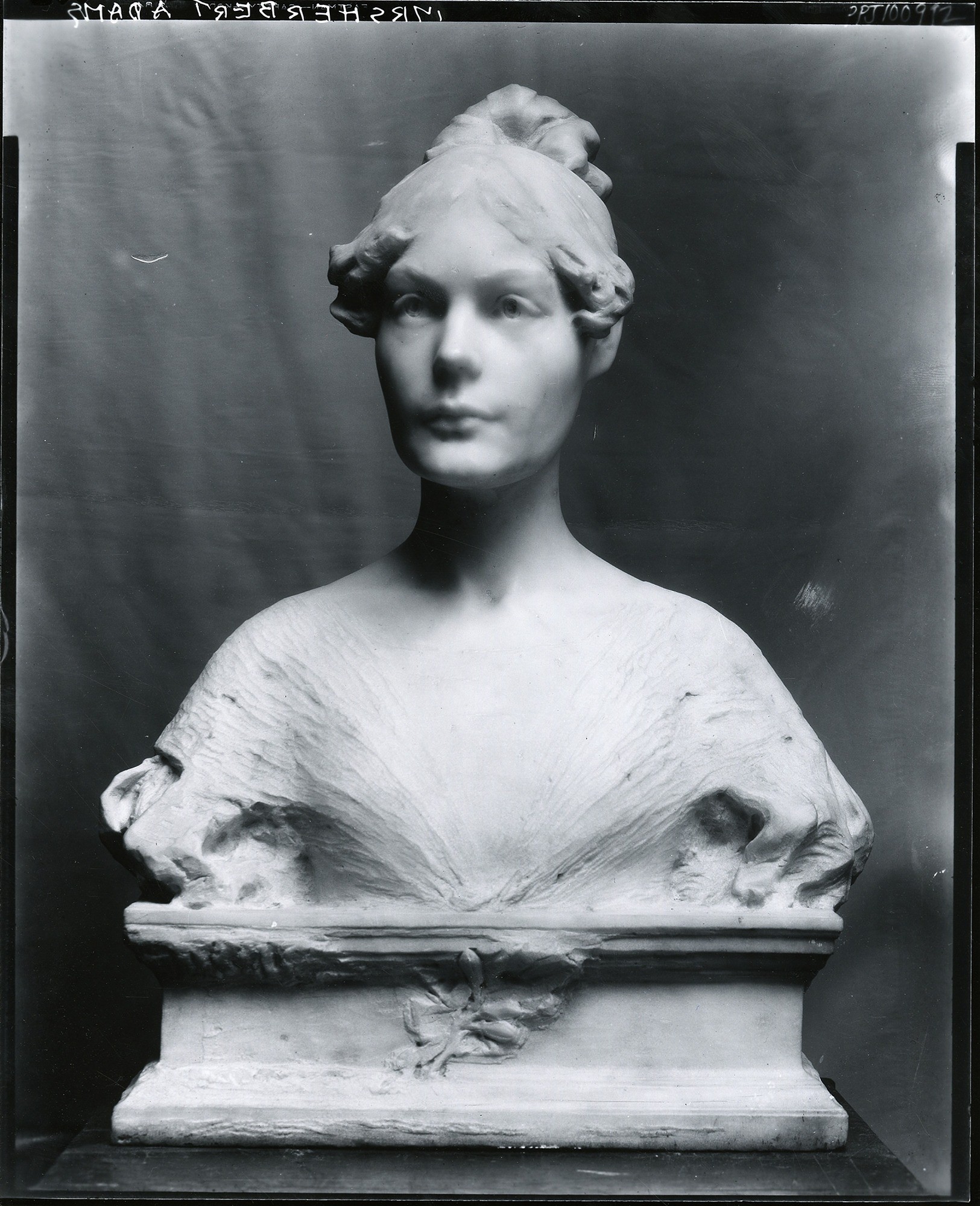
Bust of Adeline Valentine Pond by Herbert Adams in 1889

- 1887-1889 – Bust of Adeline Valentine Pond (Mrs. Herbert Adams), Hispanic Society of America, New York, New York.
- 1888 – Boys and Turtles Fountain, Fitchburg, Massachusetts.
- 1894 – The Rabbi's Daughter, private collection.
- 1896-1898 – Two bronze doors: Truth, Research, Library of Congress, Washington, D.C. Begun by Olin Levi Warner in 1895.
- 1897 – Bust of Professor Joseph Henry, Library of Congress, Washington, D.C.
- 1898 – Bust of Julia Marlowe as Juliet, Museum of the City of New York, New York, New York.
- 1898 – Memorial Tablets, Massachusetts State House, Boston, Massachusetts.
- 1898-1905 – Vanderbilt Memorial bronze doors, St. Bartholomew's Church, New York, New York.
- 1899-1900 – La Jeunesse, Metropolitan Museum of Art, New York, New York.
- 1899-1901 – Richard Smith (type-founder), Smith Memorial Arch, Fairmount Park, Philadelphia, Pennsylvania.
- 1900 – Jonathan Edwards Memorial, First Congregational Church, Northampton, Massachusetts.
- 1902 – William Ellery Channing, Boston Public Garden, Boston, Massachusetts.
- 1902-1905 – Matthias William Baldwin, City Hall, Philadelphia, Philadelphia.
- 1912 – McMillan Fountain, Washington, D.C.
- 1916 - Michigan Memorial, Vicksburg, Mississippi
- 1919-1923 – James Scott Memorial Fountain, Belle Isle Park, Detroit, Michigan (with Cass Gilbert).
- 1926-1928 – World War Memorial, Fitchburg, Massachusetts.
- 1928 – Girl with Water Lilies, National Gallery of Art, Washington, D.C.
- 1928 - Annual Medal of Honor Plaquette for the City Gardens Club of New York
- 1934 - Ninth issue of the Society of Medalists, First Little Shiner.

== Gallery ==
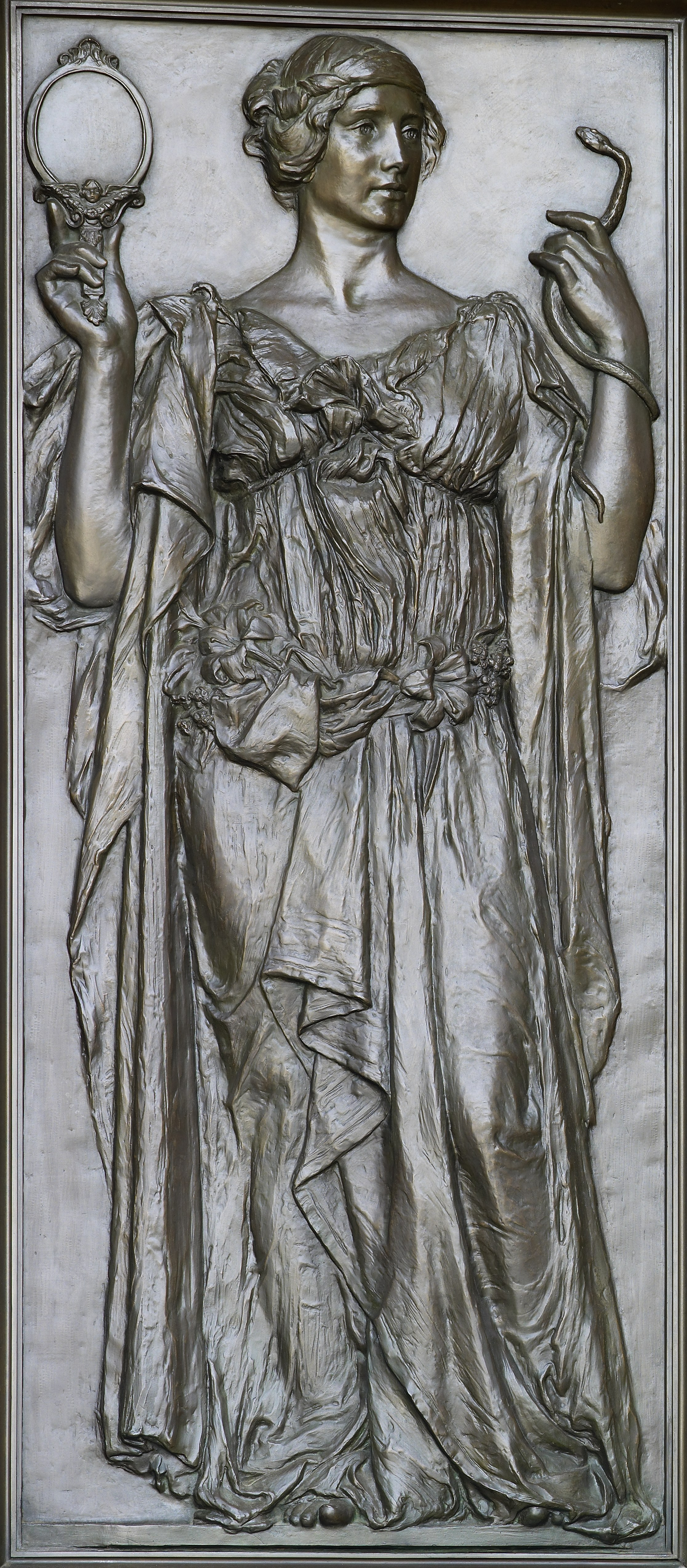
Bronze door, Truth (1896–1898), Library of Congress, Washington, D.C.

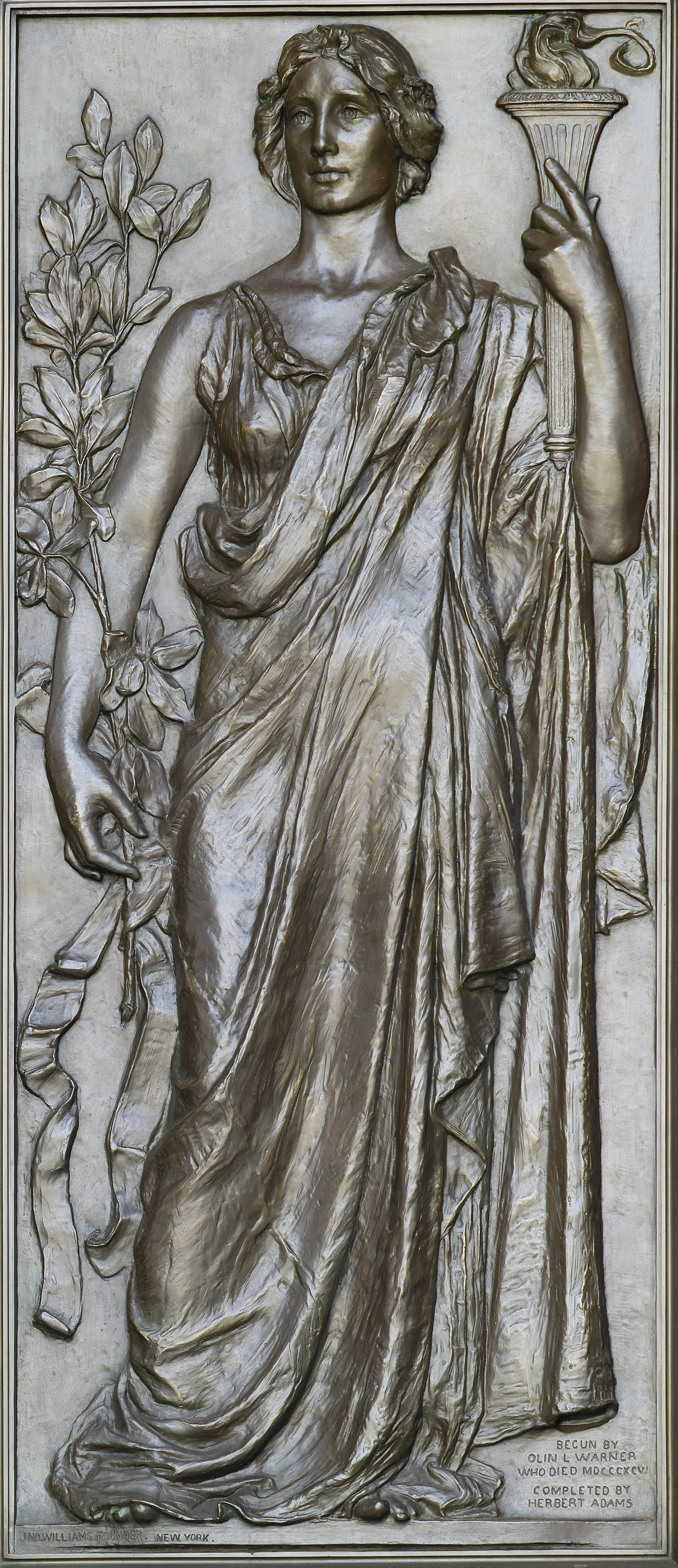
Bronze door, Research (1896–1898), Library of Congress, Washington, D.C.

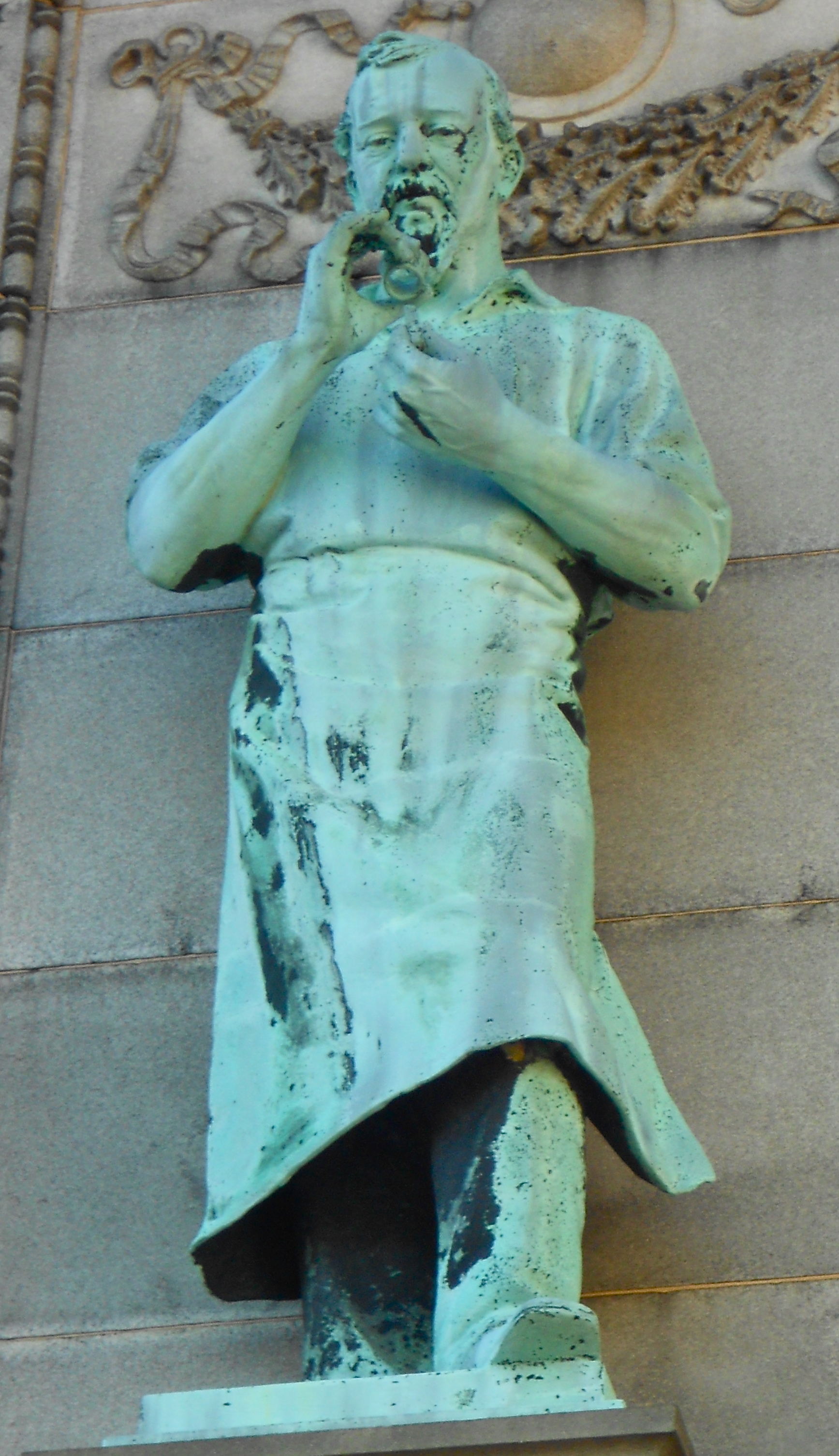
Richard Smith (1899-1901), Smith Memorial Arch, Philadelphia, Pennsylvania.

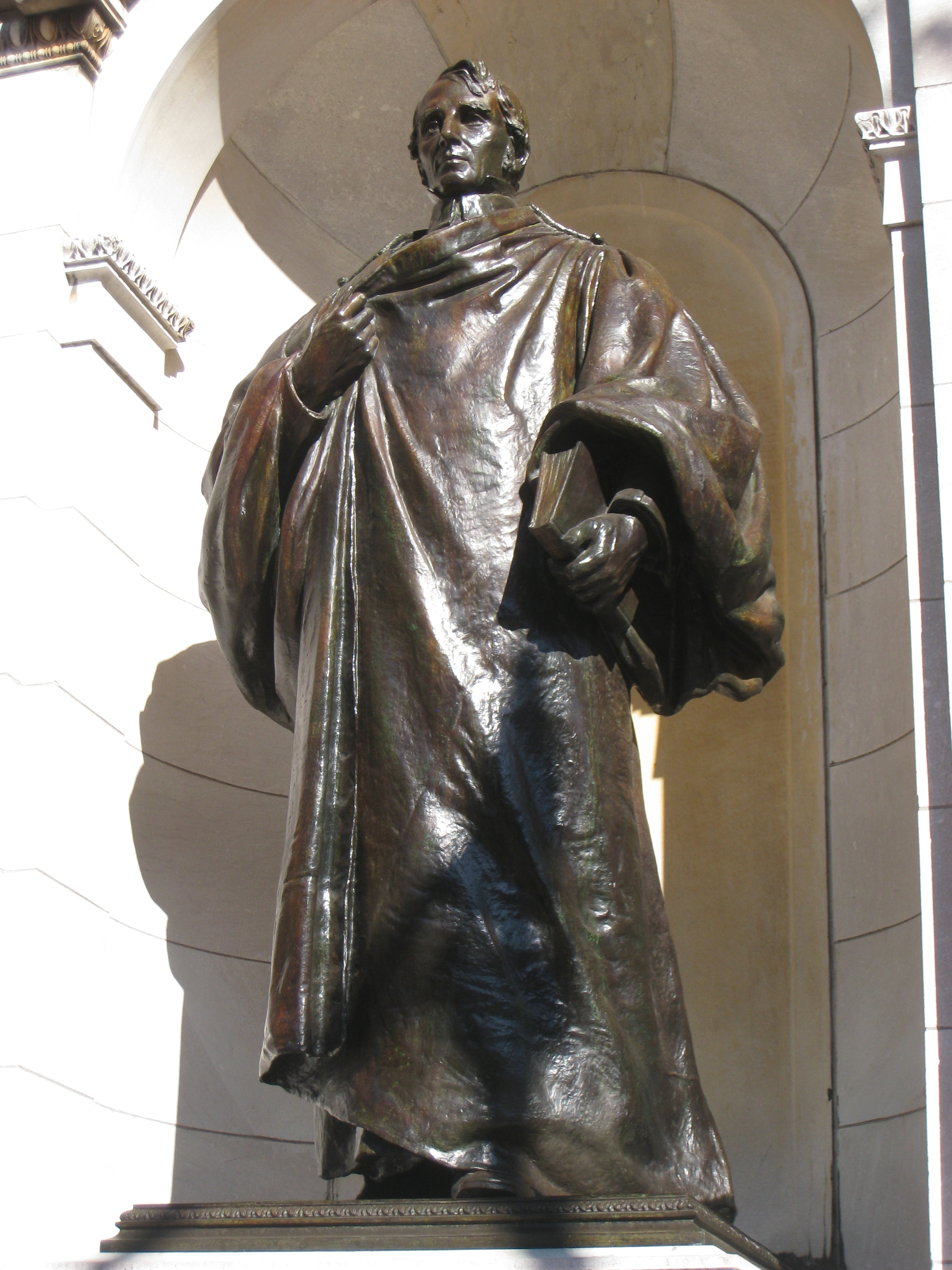
William Ellery Channing (1902), Boston Public Garden.

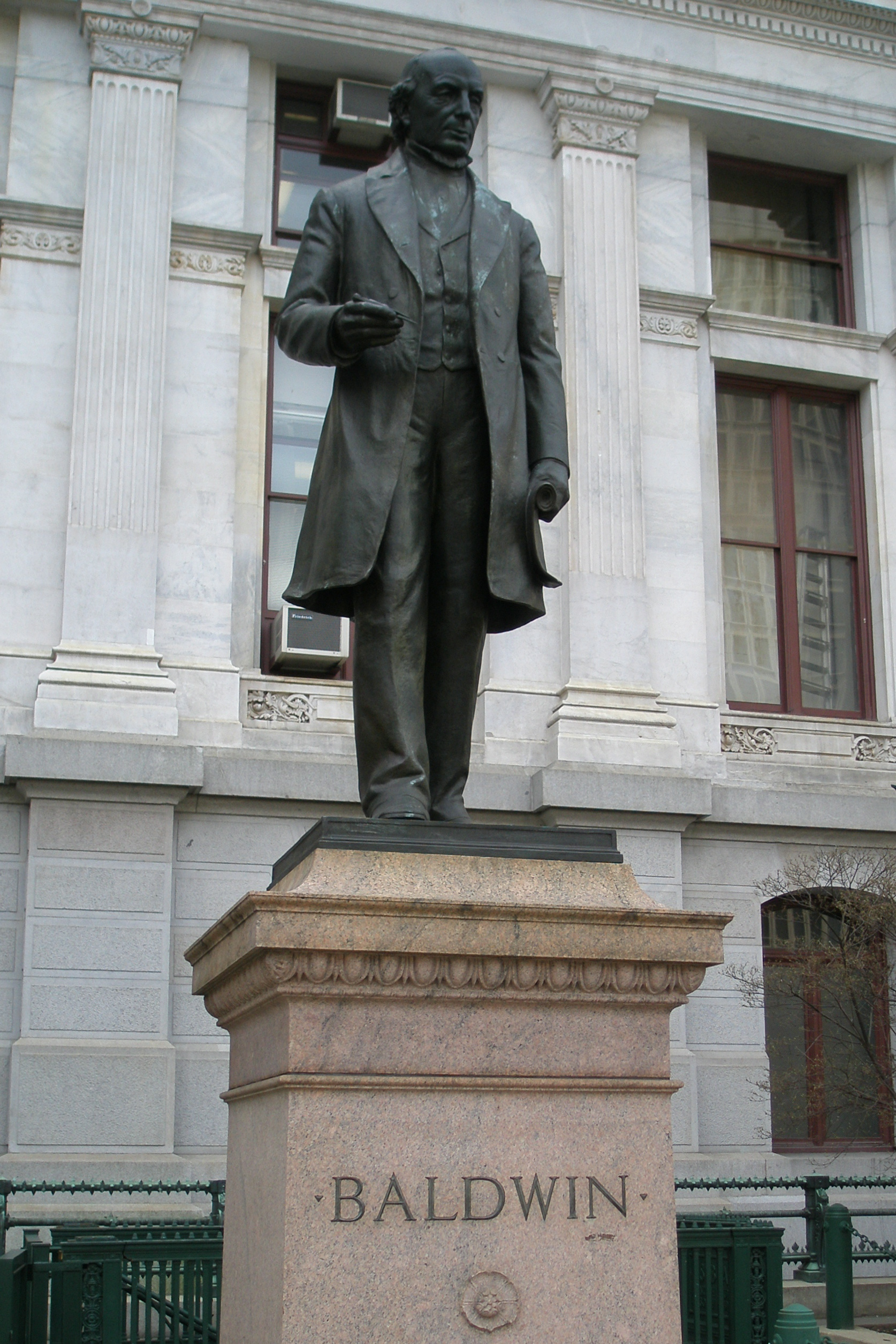
Matthias William Baldwin (1902–1905), City Hall, Philadelphia, Pennsylvania.

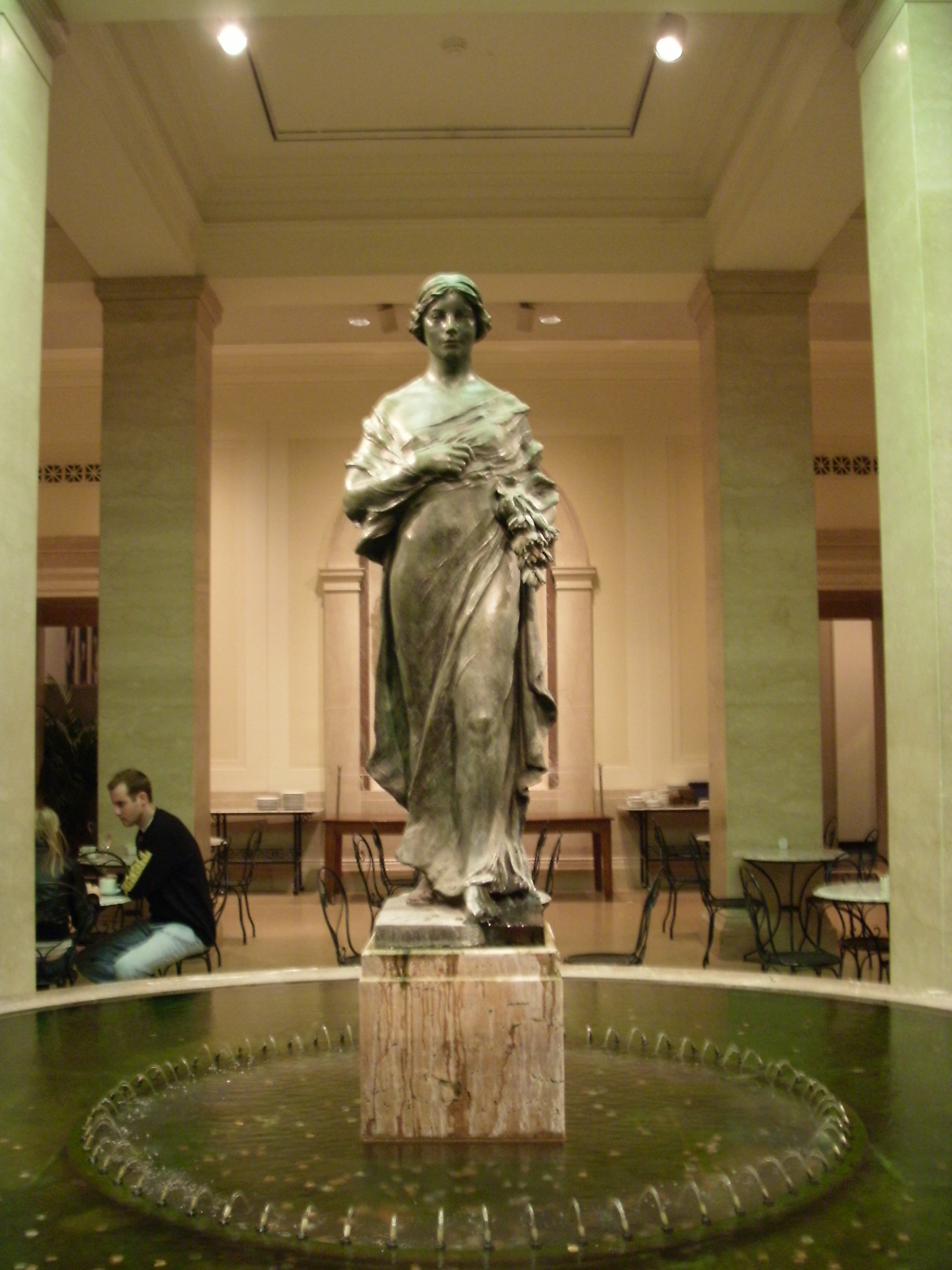
Girl with Water Lilies (1928), National Gallery of Art, Washington, D.C.

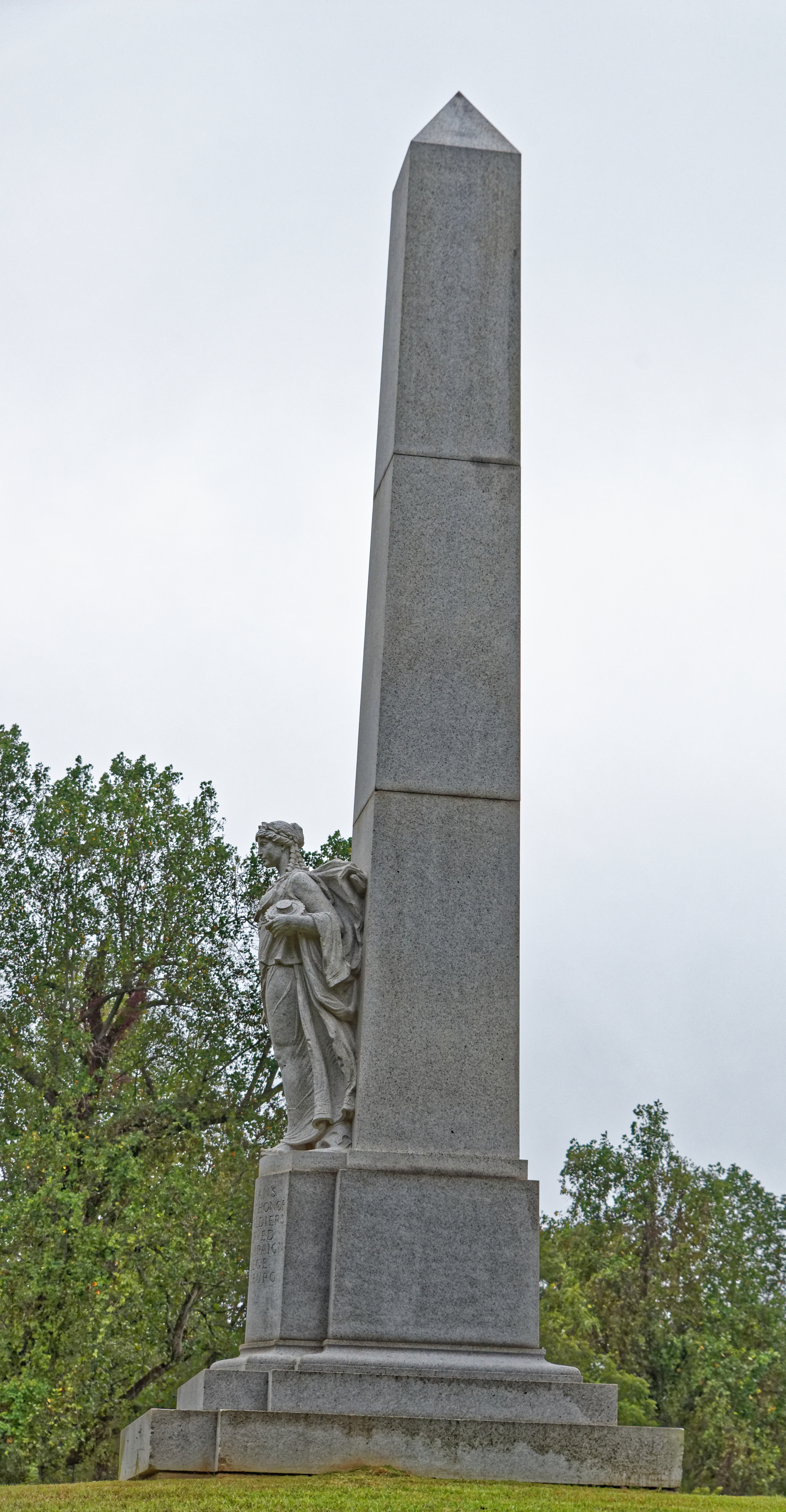
Michigan Memorial, Vicksburg, MS

== Sources ==
- American National Biography, vol. 1, pp. 96–97.
- Profile of Herbert Adams 1858-1945 Sculptor, by Marilyn Gage Hyson c. 2000, pp. 9–10, 29-30, 59-60.
