= Michigan Memorial =

Sculpture in Vicksburg National Military Park, Mississippi

- Spirit of Michigan
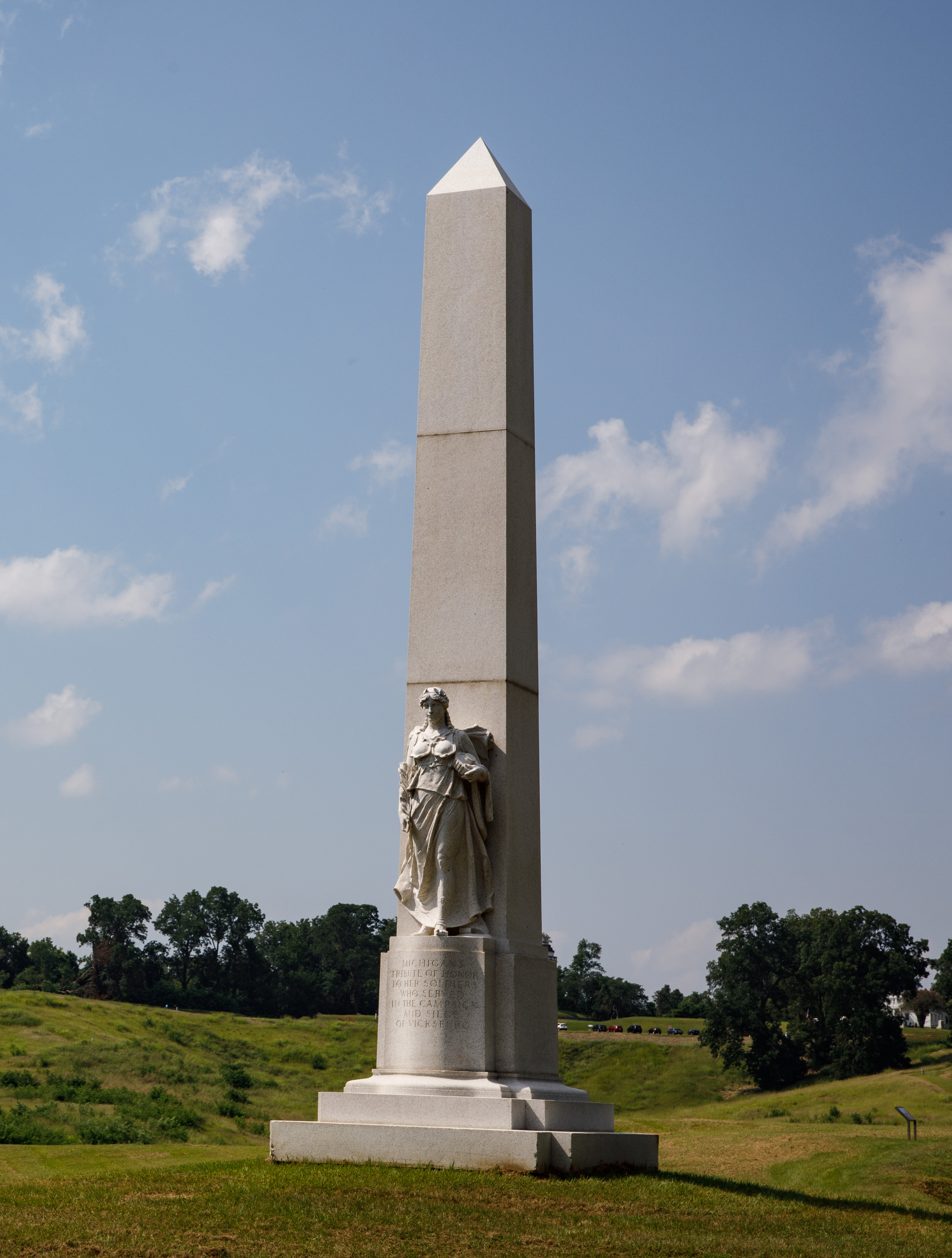
- Artist: Herbert Adams
- Year: 10 November 1916
- Medium: Bethel White granite
- Dimensions: Figure: 8 ft (2.4 m); Obelisk: 37 ft (11 m)
- Location: Vicksburg National Military Park, United States
- Coordinates: 32°21′14″N 90°50′28″W
- Owner: National Park Service

The Michigan State Memorial is located on Union Avenue within the Vicksburg, Mississippi, National Military Park. The memorial is an obelisk made of white Bethel Granite that stands 37 feet (11 m) in height. It cost $10,000 and was dedicated on November 10, 1916. The sculptor was Herbert Adams. The design features a female allegory of the Spirit of Michigan. The inscription "MICHIGAN'S/TRIBUTE OF HONOR/TO HER SOLDIERS/WHO SERVED/IN THE CAMPAIGN/AND SIEGE/OF VICKSBURG" is carved on the front of the monument.

== See also ==
- List of Union Civil War monuments and memorials
