= James Scott Memorial Fountain =

Fountain in Detroit, Michigan

Coordinates: 42.33506°N 82.99931°W

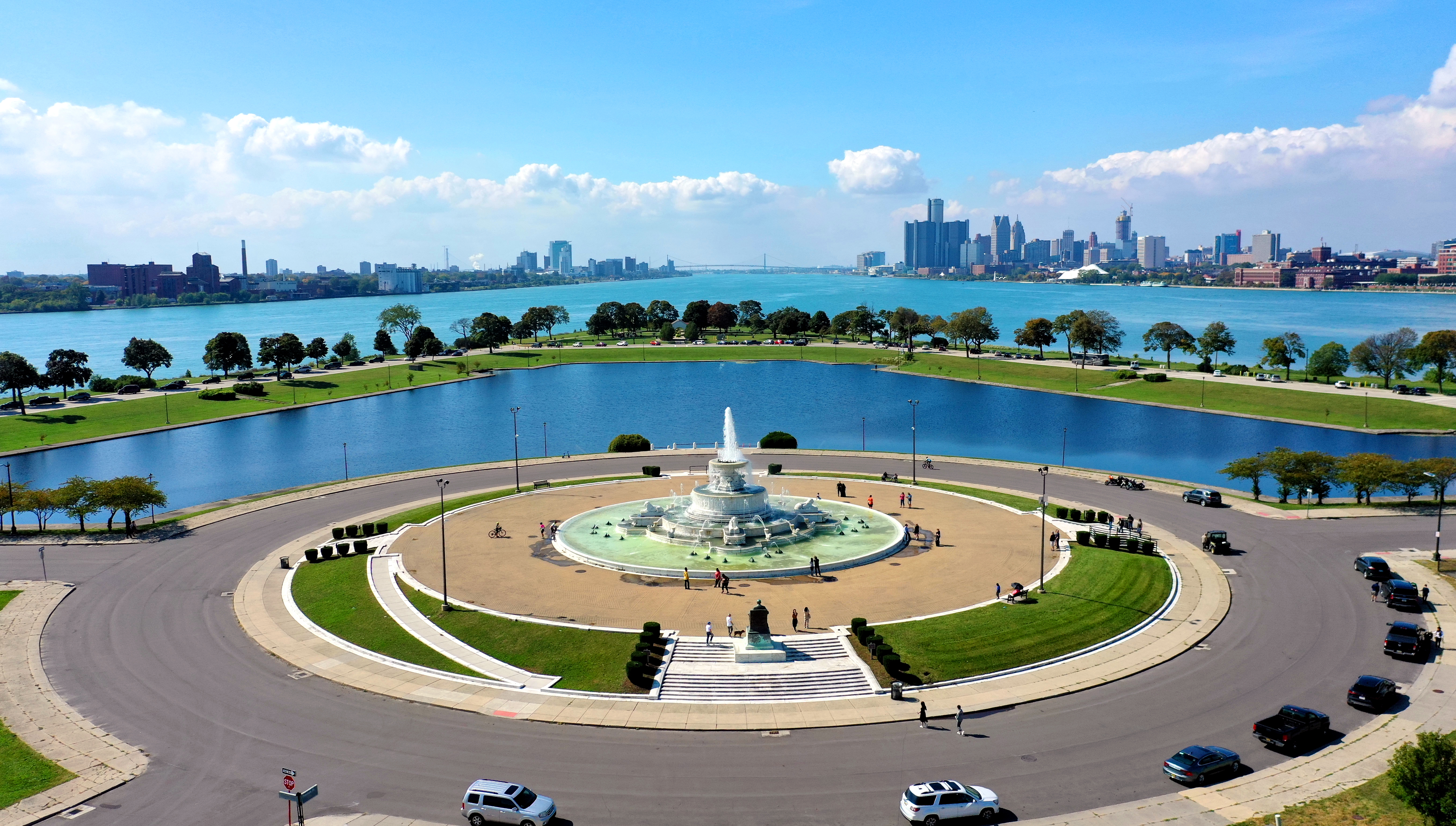
- James Scott Memorial Fountain in 2023
- Artist: Cass Gilbert & Herbert Adams
- Year: 1925
- Type: Marble
- Location: Belle Isle Park Detroit, Michigan

The James Scott Memorial Fountain is a monument located in Belle Isle Park, in Detroit, Michigan. Designed by architect Cass Gilbert and sculptor Herbert Adams, the fountain was completed in 1925 at a cost of $500,000. The lower bowl has a diameter of 510 ft (160 m) and the central spray reaches 125 ft (38 m). The fountain honors the controversial James Scott, who left $200,000 to the City of Detroit for a fountain in tribute to the people of Detroit.

== History ==
Scott was left a sizable fortune by his father who invested in Detroit real estate. According to contemporaries, Scott funded gambling parlors and was known as inveterare storyteller. He was described by twentieth-century author W. Hawkins Ferry as a "vindictive, scurrilous misanthrope" who attempted to intimidate his business competitors and when this was unsuccessful, he filed suit. Perhaps for these reasons, Scott died in 1910 with a handful of cousins who sought to cash in on the estate, but to no avail. Jim bequeathed his estate to the City of Detroit with the condition that the fountain include a life-sized bronze statue of him. Some accounts state that the will required that the statue be at the fountain's pinnacle.

Several community and religious leaders—including Bishop Charles D. Williams—spoke against accepting the bequest, saying that a person with Scott's reputation should not be immortalized in the city. Mayor Philip Breitmeyer and City Council President David Heineman urged accepting the gift, saying that the city shouldn't insult any of its citizens by refusing such a generous offer.

While the debate raged, Scott's fortune continued to grow, topping $1 million by the time construction commenced.

On August 30, 1979, architect Jan Popiel, recently graduated from the University of Detroit, was shot in his car while sitting at the fountain. The car, which was in gear, rolled into the fountain and Popiel drowned. His murder remains unsolved.

Since 2018, the Detroit Grand Prix INDYCAR race has used the Fountain as its podium backdrop. Drivers are known to dip into the fountain after a race win.

== Design ==
The monument is located in Belle Isle Park, in Detroit, Michigan. Designed by architect Cass Gilbert and sculptor Herbert Adams, the marble fountain was completed in 1925 at a cost of $500,000. The lower bowl has a diameter of 510 ft (160 m) and the central spray reaches 125 ft (38 m). The final design placed Scott's statue in an inconspicuous spot behind the fountain.

== Film appearances ==
A famous scene from the 1973 drama Scarecrow, starring Gene Hackman and Al Pacino was filmed here. In the scene, shortly after learning of the death of his estranged son (though falsified by the mother), Pacino's character Francis Lionel 'Lion' Delbuchi happily plays with a group of children. Then, upon uncovering a deep emotional truth, he snatches one of them up and begins to ascend the fountain. He is left catatonic in a hospital following the incident.

The fountain is also briefly featured in Anthony Mann's 1947 film noir T-Men, photographed by John Alton. Early in the film, two Treasury Agents preparing to go undercover discuss Detroit criminal gangs and gang activities while standing in front of the fountain.

== Gallery ==
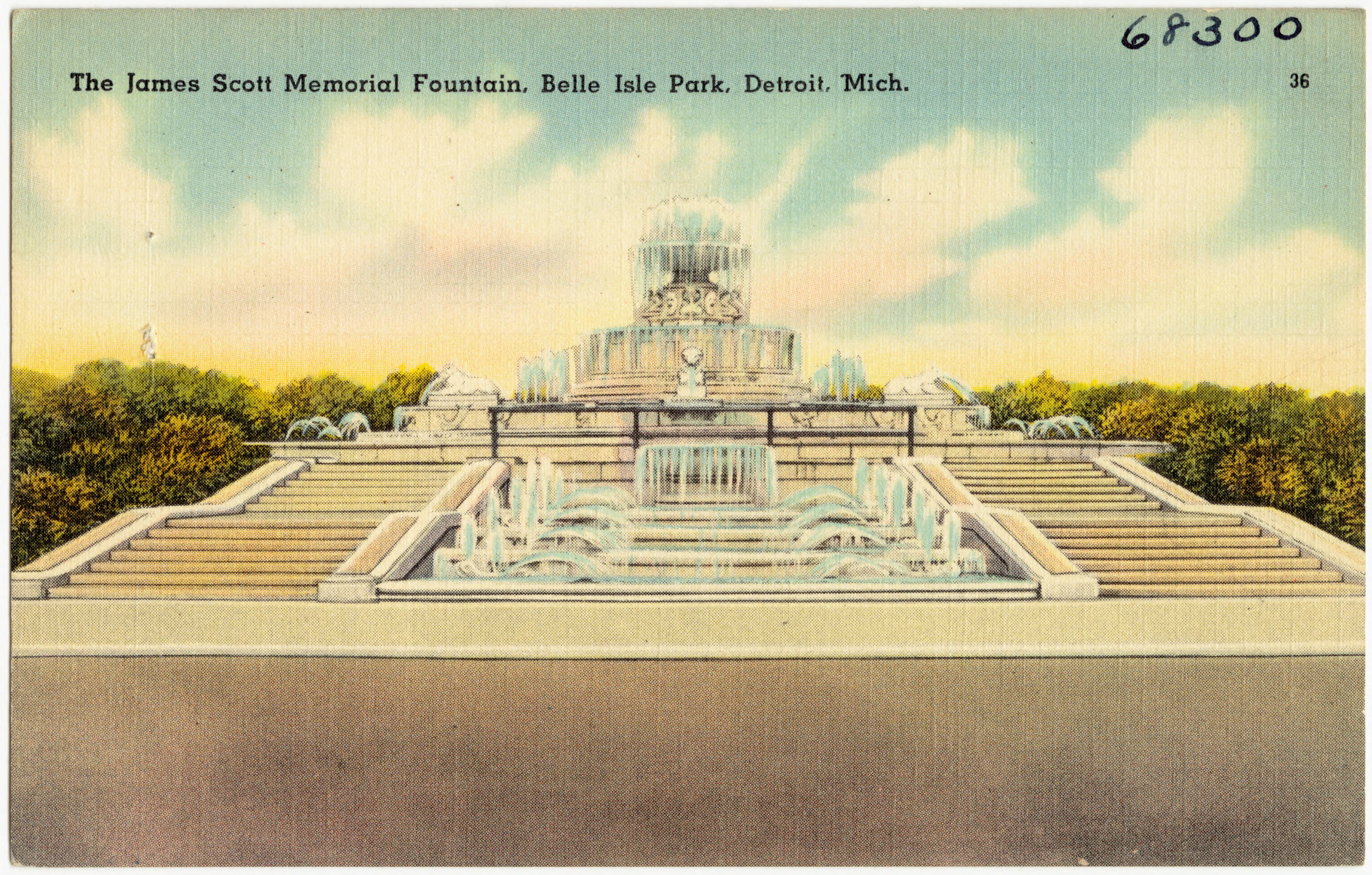
Postcard appearance

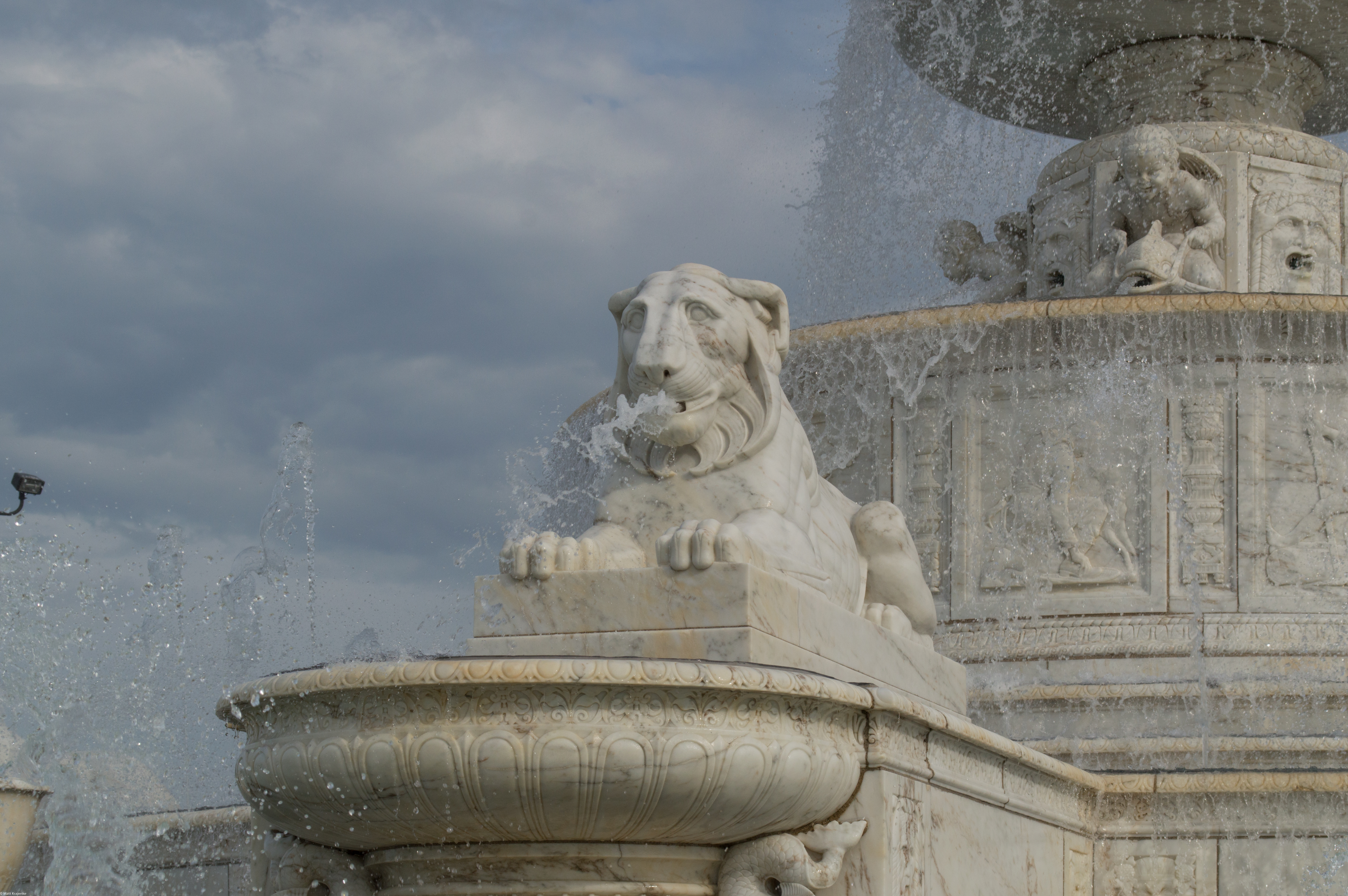
Detail of one of fountain's lion figures

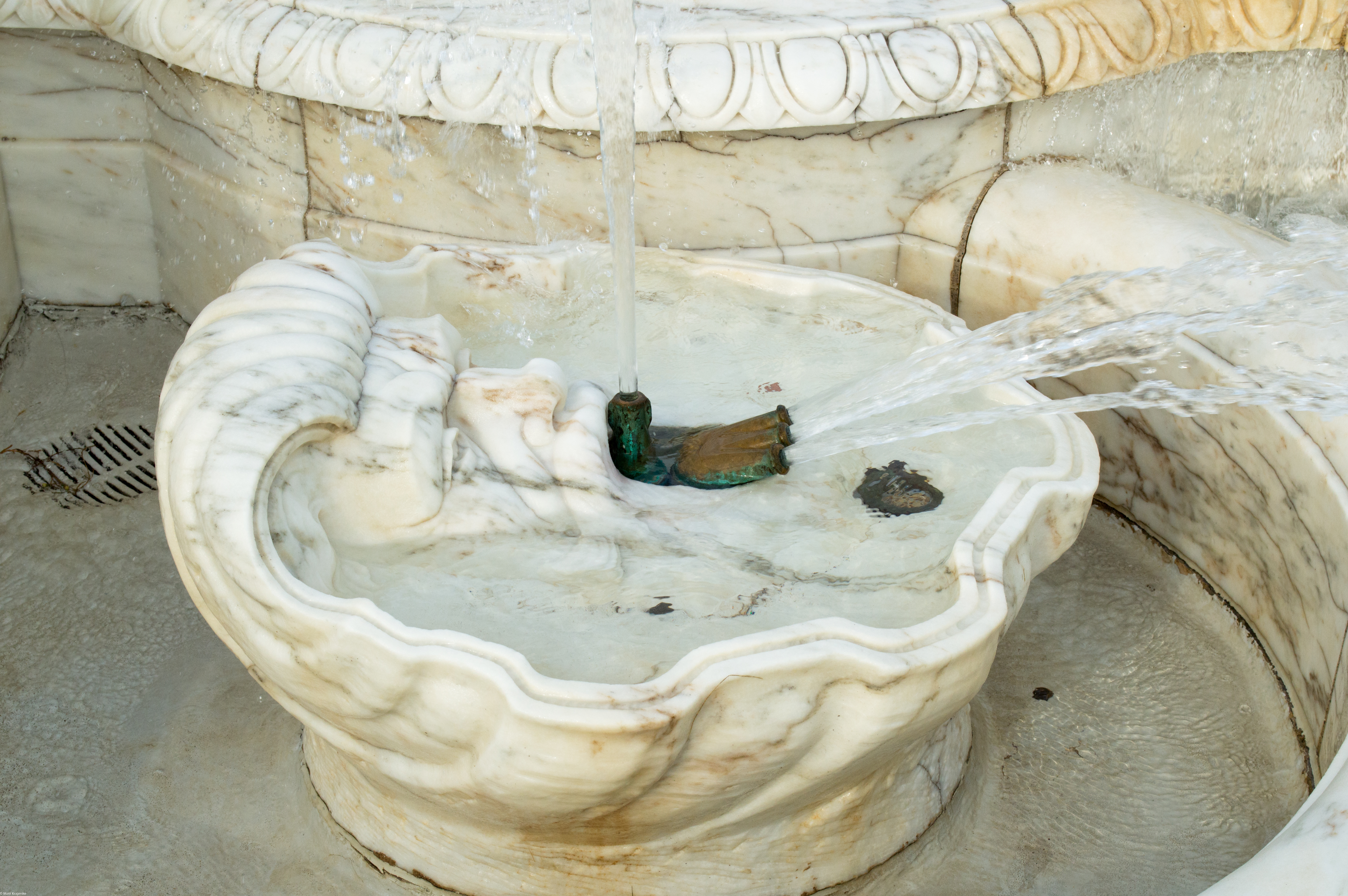
Detail of one of the eight small pools in the lower basin

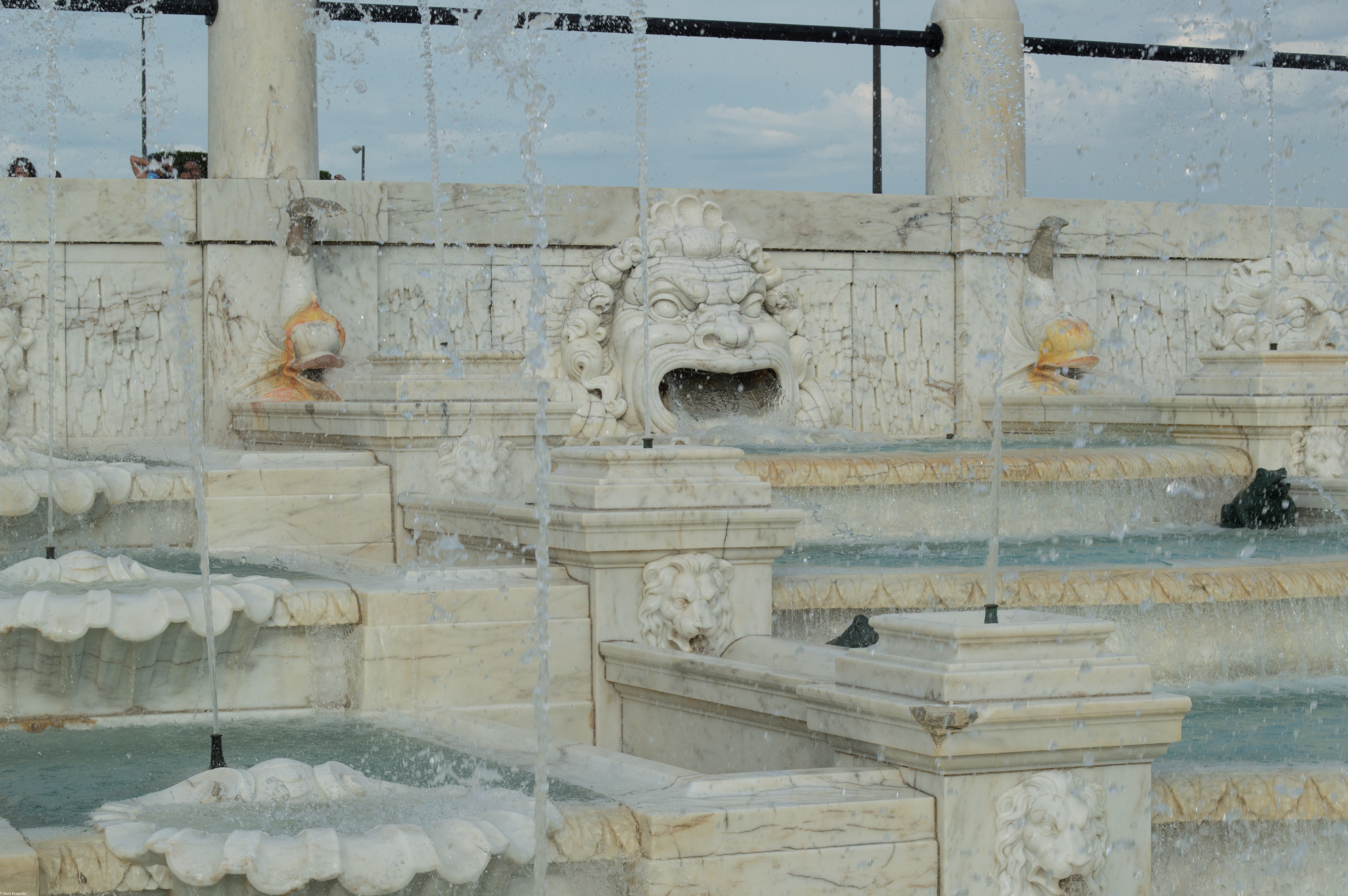
The lower basin

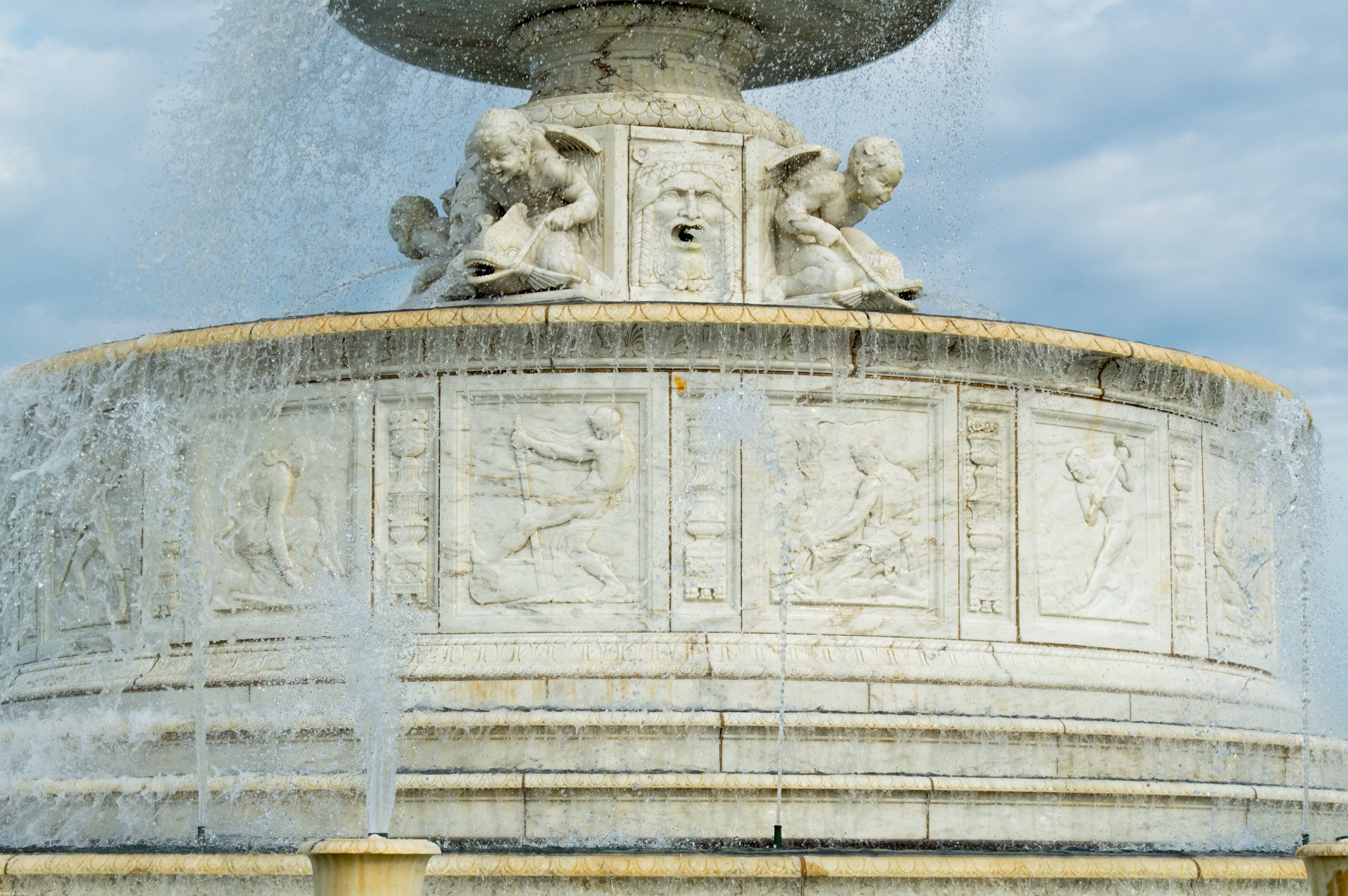
16 separate reliefs depict life in the early days of Detroit

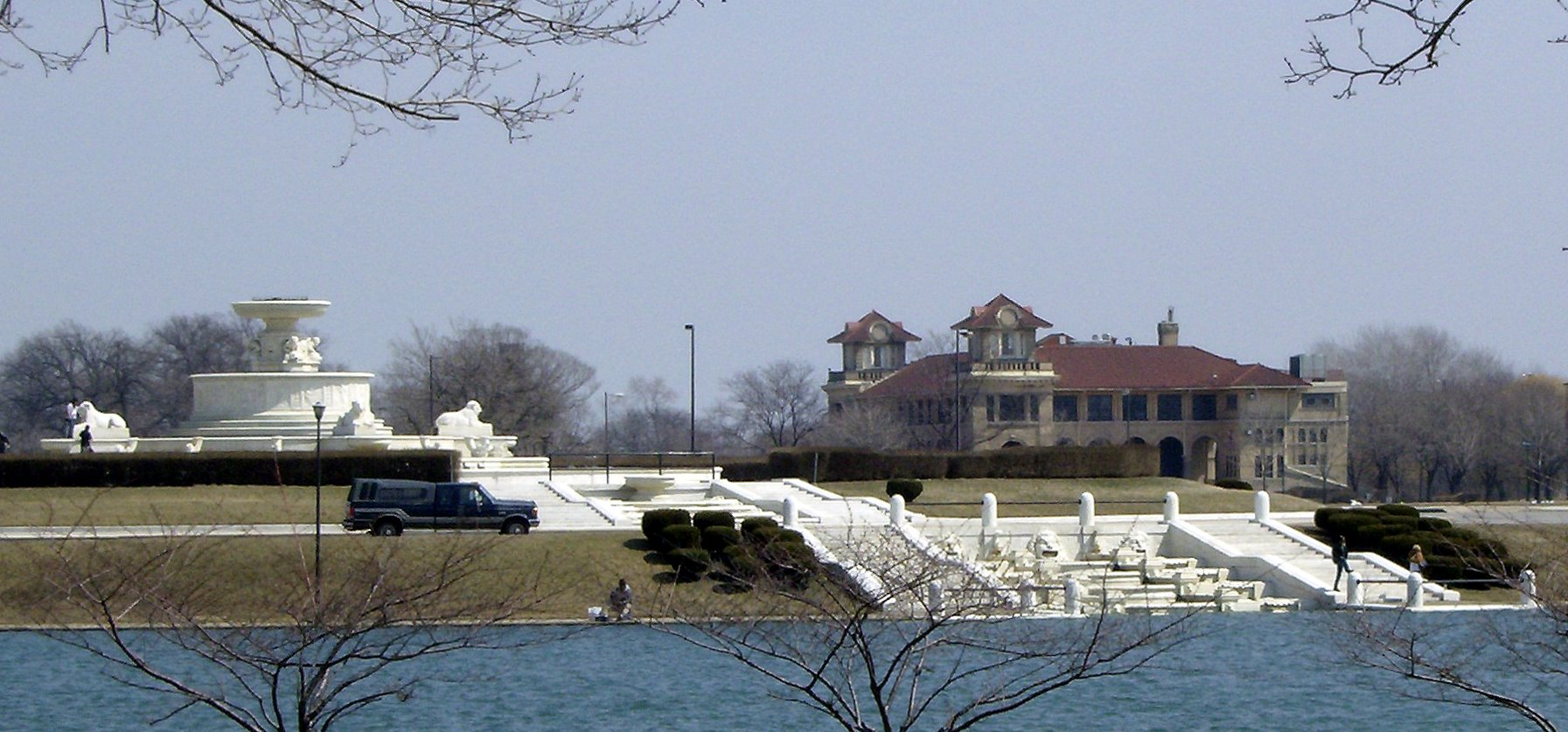
The Belle Isle Casino is in the background of a dry James Scott Memorial Fountain
