= 1901 in art =

Events from the year 1901 in art.

== Events ==
- March 12 – Whitechapel Gallery, designed by Charles Harrison Townsend, opens in London as one of the first publicly funded galleries for temporary exhibitions in the city.
- March 17 – The first large-scale showing of Van Gogh's paintings in Paris as 71 are shown at the Bernheim-Jeune gallery, 11 years after his death.
- May 6 – The Royal Academy Exhibition of 1901 opens at Burlington House in London
- May 11 – The Kraków Society of Friends of Fine Arts inaugurates its Palace of Art.
- June 24 – The first showing of Picasso's paintings in Paris as the 19-year-old Spanish artist exhibits his work at Ambroise Vollard's gallery. Preparing for the show (from May) he has worked in the Paris studio of his friend Carles Casagemas who had committed suicide on February 17. Later this year, Picasso's Blue Period begins.
- Julien-Auguste Hervé exhibits his paintings in Paris under the title Expressionismes.
- The "Red Rose Girls" rent the Red Rose Inn in Villanova, Pennsylvania in the Philadelphia Main Line.
- Swedish-born painter Carl Oscar Borg enters the United States as a stowaway.

== Works ==
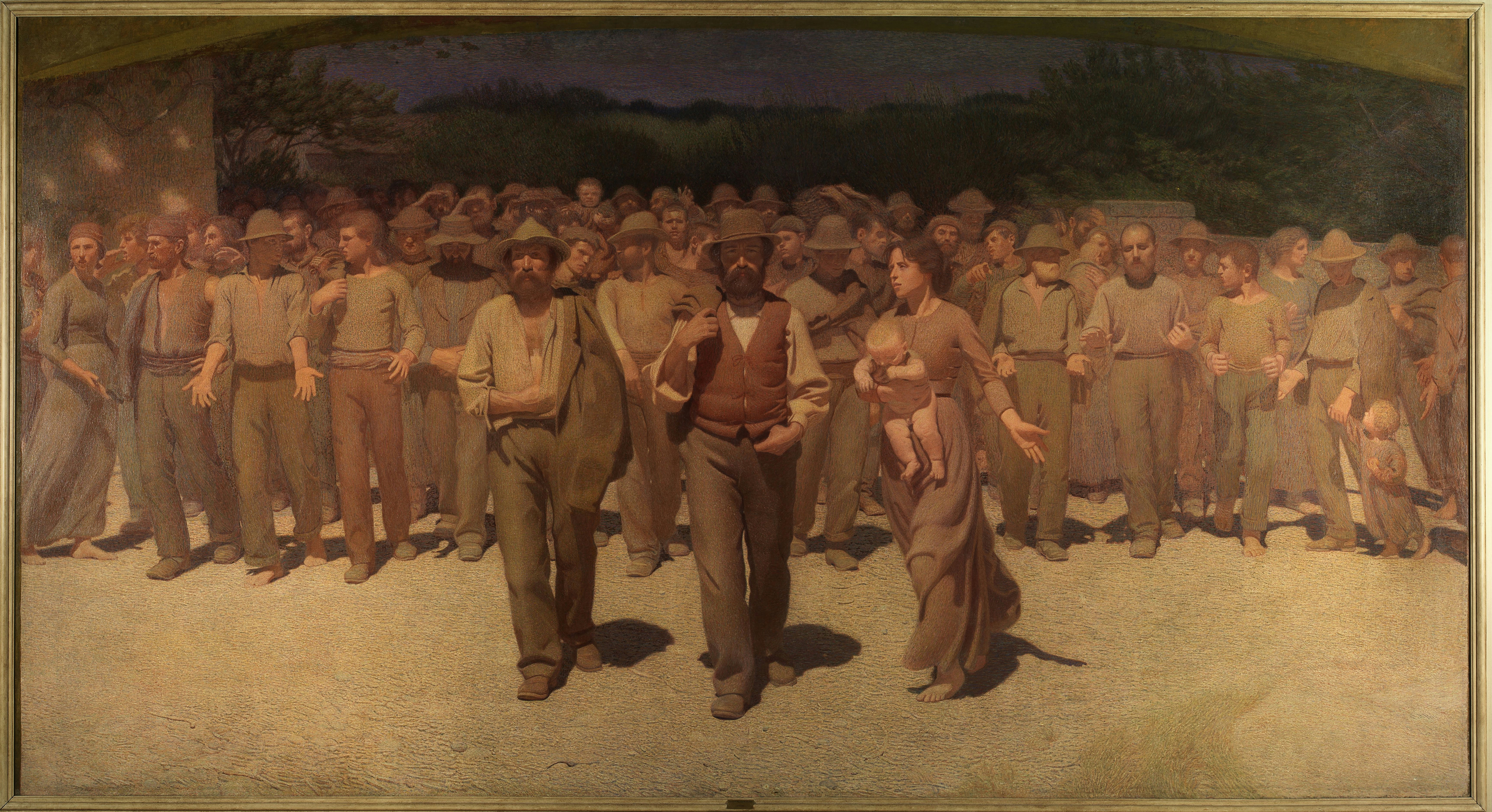
Pellizza – The Fourth Estate

- Sigvald Asbjørnsen – Statue of Leif Erikson (Chicago)
- John Collier – In the Venusberg
- Frank Cadogan Cowper – An Aristocrat answering the Summons to Execution, Paris 1791
- Margaret Isabel Dicksee – The First Commission
- Thomas Eakins – Portrait of Leslie W. Miller
- Albert Edelfelt – Portrait of the opera singer Aino Ackté
- Joseph Farquharson – Beneath the Snow Encumbered Branches
- Stanhope Forbes – The 22nd January 1901: Reading the News of Queen Victoria’s Death in a Cornish Cottage
- Paul Gauguin – Still Life with Hope
- J. W. Godward
  - At The Garden Door
  - Chloris
- Arthur Hacker – The Cloud
- Winslow Homer – Searchlight on Harbor Entrance, Santiago de Cuba

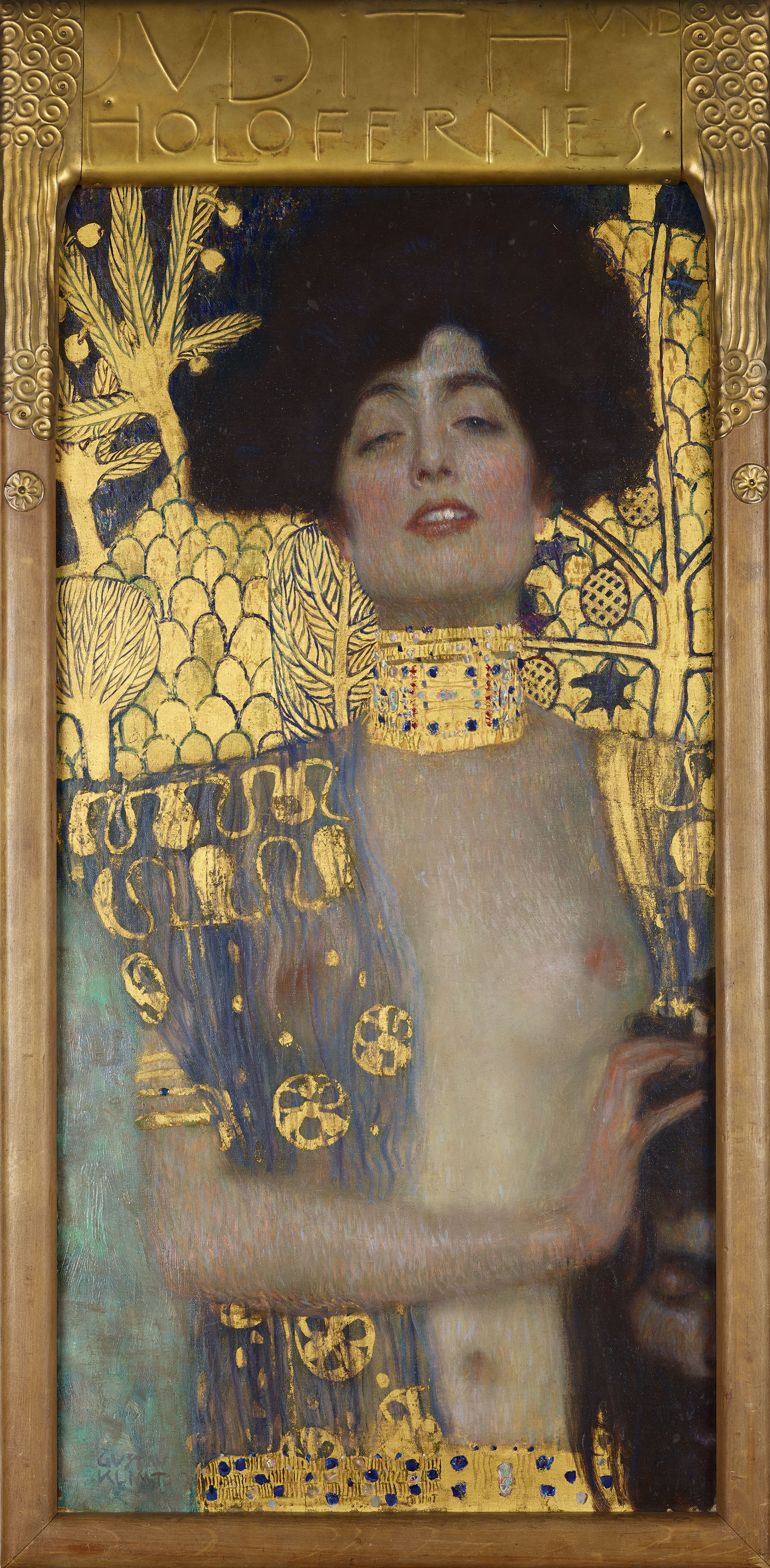
Klimt – Judith I

- Hamo Thornycroft – Statue of Alfred the Great
- Gustav Klimt
  - Buchenwald (Birkenwald)
  - Judith I
  - Music (lithograph)
- Edmund Leighton – The Accolade
- Max Liebermann – Two Riders on the Beach (two versions)
- Maximilien Luce – The Quai Saint-Michel and Notre-Dame
- Adolfo Müller-Ury – portrait of Lulu Pfizer
- Giuseppe Pellizza da Volpedo – The Fourth Estate (Il quarto stato, originally entitled The path of workers)
- Pablo Picasso - too many to list - see List of Picasso artworks 1901–1910
  - Blue Roofs
  - Portrait of Gustave Coquiot
  - The Wait (Margot)
- Camille Pissarro
  - Hay Harvest at Éragny
  - Morning, Winter Sunshine, Frost, the Pont-Neuf, the Seine, the Louvre (approximate date)
- Maurice Prendergast - The Terrace bridge, Central Park
- Henrietta Rae – portrait of Lord Dufferin
- Ilya Repin – Leo Nikolayevich Tolstoy Barefoot
- Walter Sickert – The Rialto
- Douglas Tilden – Mechanics Monument (San Francisco, California)
- Anders Zorn
  - Freya
  - Stickande kulla, Kål-Margit ("Girl from Dalecarlia Knitting")

== Births ==
=== January to June ===
- 7 January – Fahrelnissa Zeid, Turkish abstract artist (d. 1991).
- 9 January – Chic Young, American cartoonist (d. 1973).
- 24 January – Cassandre, born Adolphe Jean-Marie Mouron, Ukrainian-born French graphic designer (d. 1968).
- 28 January – Richmond Barthé, African-American sculptor (d. 1989).
- 22 March – Greta Kempton, Austrian-American artist (d. 1991).
- 24 March – Ub Iwerks, American animator, cartoonist and special effects technician (d. 1971).
- 27 March – Carl Barks, American illustrator and comic book creator (d. 2000).
- 7 April – Christopher Wood, English painter (suicide 1930).
- 9 June – John Skeaping, English sculptor and equine painter (d. 1980).

=== July to December ===
- July 5 – Len Lye, New Zealand-born kinetic sculptor and filmmaker (d. 1980).
- July 15 – Pyke Koch, Dutch painter (d. 1991).
- July 31 – Jean Dubuffet, French painter and sculptor (d. 1985).
- August 29 – Anna Zinkeisen, Scottish-born artist (died 1976)
- September 14 – Lucien Aigner, Hungarian photographer (d. 1999).
- October 2 – Alice Prin ("Kiki de Montparnasse"), French artists' model and painter (d. 1953).
- October 10 – Alberto Giacometti, Swiss sculptor (d. 1966)
- November 7 – Norah McGuinness, Irish painter and illustrator (d. 1980)
- November 11 – Richard Lindner, German-American painter (d. 1978)
- December 1 – Charles Tunnicliffe, British wildlife painter (d. 1979)
- December 5 – Walt Disney, American cartoonist, animator and filmmaker (d. 1966)
- December 27 – Stanley Hayter, English-born printmaker (d. 1988)
- December 30 – Beauford Delaney, American modernist painter (d. 1979)

=== Full date unknown ===
- Roland Ansieau, French graphic artist (d. 1987)
- Michael Cardew, English studio potter (d. 1983)
- Dorothy Dehner, American sculptor (d. 1994)
- Philip Evergood, American painter, printmaker and sculptor (d. 1973)
- Albert Swinden, English-born American painter (d. 1961)

== Deaths ==
- January 9 – Edward Mitchell Bannister, African American Tonalist painter (b. 1828)
- January 17 – Paul Hankar, Belgian sculptor, designer and architect (b. 1859)
- February 21 – Henry Peach Robinson, English photographer (b. 1830)
- March 6 – John Jabez Edwin Mayall, English photographer (b. 1813)
- March 17 – Jean-Charles Cazin, French landscape painter and ceramicist (b. 1840)
- May 2 – Blaise Alexandre Desgoffe, French still-life painter (b. 1830)
- June 5 – Dagny Juel, Norwegian-born artists' model (b. 1867) (shot)
- June 8 – Edward Moran, English-born American marine painter (b. 1829)
- September 9 – Henri de Toulouse-Lautrec, French painter (b. 1864)
- October 24 – James McDougal Hart, Scottish-born American painter (b. 1828)
- November 6 – Kate Greenaway, English illustrator (b. 1846)
- December 23 – Edward Onslow Ford, English sculptor (b. 1852)
