= Portrait of Queen Victoria (Benjamin-Constant) =

Painting by Jean-Joseph Benjamin-Constant

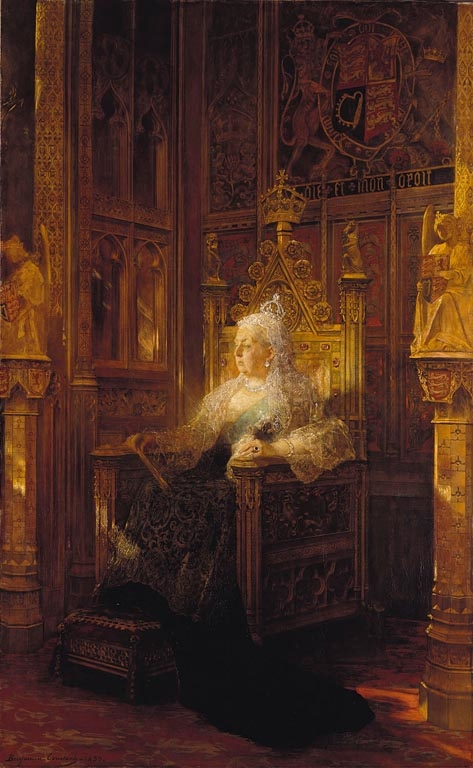
- Artist: Jean-Joseph Benjamin-Constant
- Year: 1899
- Type: Oil on canvas, portrait painting
- Dimensions: 327.2 cm × 202.0 cm (128.8 in × 79.5 in)
- Location: Royal Collection, Windsor Castle

Portrait of Queen Victoria is an oil on canvas portrait painting by the French artist Jean-Joseph Benjamin-Constant, from 1899.

It presents Queen Victoria seated on the Sovereign's Throne in the House of Lords. The Queen is shown surrounded by the elaborate designs of Augustus Pugin. Benjamin-Constant produced it based on a single sitting that lasted for twenty minutes.

The painting was commissioned by the The Illustrated London News who were primarily interested in the copyright for reproductions. It attracted great attention when it was exhibited at the Paris Exposition of 1900. Following the death of Queen Victoria in January 1901 the image became a symbol of the later years of her reign. At the Royal Academy Exhibition of 1901 held at Burlington House in London, the painting was given pride of place as a tribute to the late queen. It had been acquired by her son Edward VII and remains in the Royal Collection today.

== Bibliography ==
- Dumas, Ann, Stevens, Maryanne & Rosenblum, Robert. 1900: Art at the Crossroads. Harry N. Abrams, 2000.
- Plunkett, John. Queen Victoria: First Media Monarch. Oxford University Press, 2003.
