= Commission (art) =

Hiring and payment for the creation of a piece of art

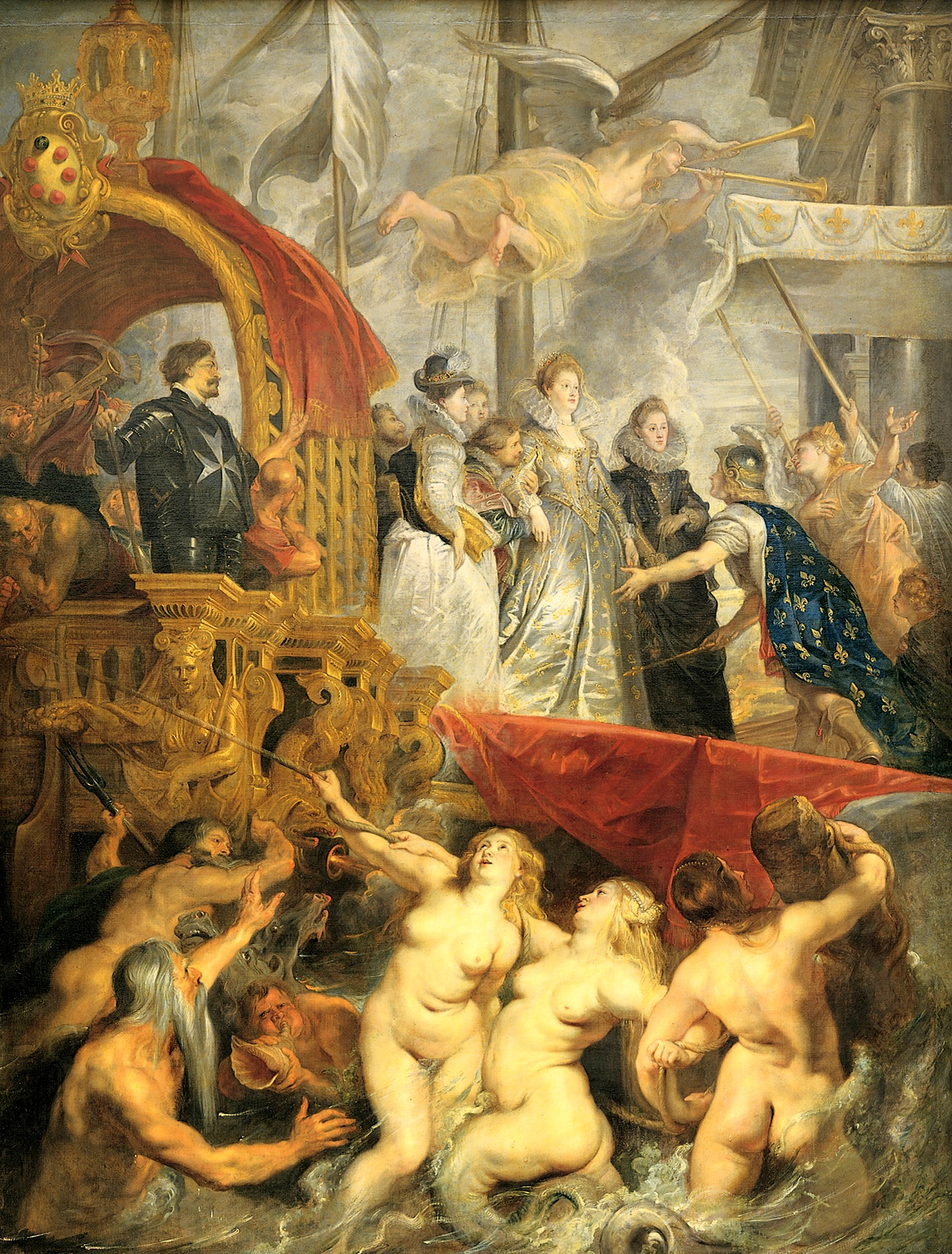
The Arrival of Marie de Medici at Marseille by Rubens (c. 1622–1625)

In art, a commission is the act of requesting the creation of a piece, often on behalf of another. Artwork may be commissioned by private individuals, by the government, or businesses. Commissions often resemble endorsement or sponsorship.

In classical music, ensembles often commission pieces from composers, where the ensemble secures the composer's payment from private or public organizations or donors.

== History ==
Throughout history, it has been common for rulers and governments to commission public art as a means of demonstrating power and wealth, or even for specific propaganda purposes.

In ancient Rome, large architectural projects were commissioned as symbols of imperial glory. The Roman Colosseum for example, was commissioned by Emperor Vespasian. Public statuary was widespread, depicting mythical and heroic figures. The frieze that is carved into the Marcus Column, located at the Campus Martius, depicts the figure of Victory, and would have been commissioned to honour successful military campaigns waged by Marcus Aurelius. Ancient Roman culture was anti-intellectual and held artists in low esteem, in contrast to ancient cultures such as the Greek or Babylonian. Despite this, the sheer amount of surviving artworks commissioned at the height of the Roman Empire testify to the rulers' view that art could influence public opinion.

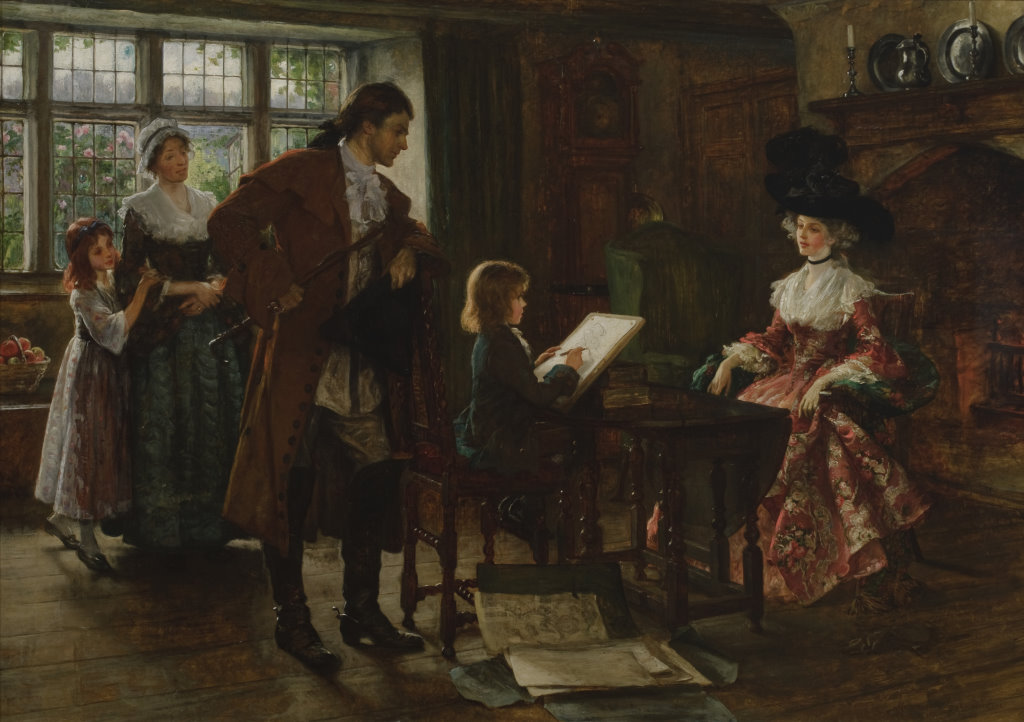
The First Commission by Margaret Isabel Dicksee, 1901. It depicts the first commission from the gifted young Thomas Lawrence in the eighteenth century

During the Renaissance, visual art flourished in the cities of Italy due to the patronage of wealthy merchants and government officials, such as Cesare Borgia. Leonardo da Vinci earned steady commissions for artwork ranging from paintings (such as the Virgin of the Rocks for the Church of San Francisco Grande), to murals (The Last Supper for the monastery church of Santa Maria della Grazia), to sculptures (the Gran Cavallo at Sforza). The most famous commissioned artwork of the Renaissance may be the Sistine Chapel ceiling at the Vatican, painted by Michelangelo as a commission for Pope Julius II.

In the internet era, art commissions are used as a consistent revenue model for independent online artists on various online art platforms, such as DeviantArt and Pixiv. According to a 2014 Hiscox report, online sales of artworks are estimated to have generated approximately $1.57 billion, 1.6% of the entire art market.

== Commissions and visual artist ==
Today, public artworks may be commissioned by benefactors who wish to donate the artwork to a city as a gift to the public. "Famine" (1997), a series of sculptures by Rowan Gillespie depicting victims of the Great Famine, was commissioned by Norma Smurfit and donated to the city of Dublin, Ireland. The harrowing memorial has brought other commissions to Gillespie, who has created companion sculptures for the cities of Toronto and Boston.

According to US copyright law, copyright holders have the sole right to distribute derivative works based on an original creation. This includes commissioned fan art, which is not in itself fair use. Sales of commissioned copyrighted material require permission of the copyright owner. The US also has agreements with most other countries regarding copyright and most respect each other's copyright laws. A full list of countries that comply with US copyright law and other information about US copyright law can be found on the US Government's copyright law website.

== Other uses ==
An art gallery or dealer "processes" the artist's work usually resulting in a sale of the artworks on the artist's behalf. The dealer or art gallery then typically takes a percentage of the price. This portion is called the gallery's "commission". The remainder of the proceeds goes to the artist. In this way, the gallery or dealer is not only the middleman but obliquely takes the role of "patron" in that it provides representation, housing of artworks, marketing and income for the artist.

== See also ==
- Dedication (art)
- Premiere
