= Royal Academy Exhibition of 1901 =

1901 art exhibition in London

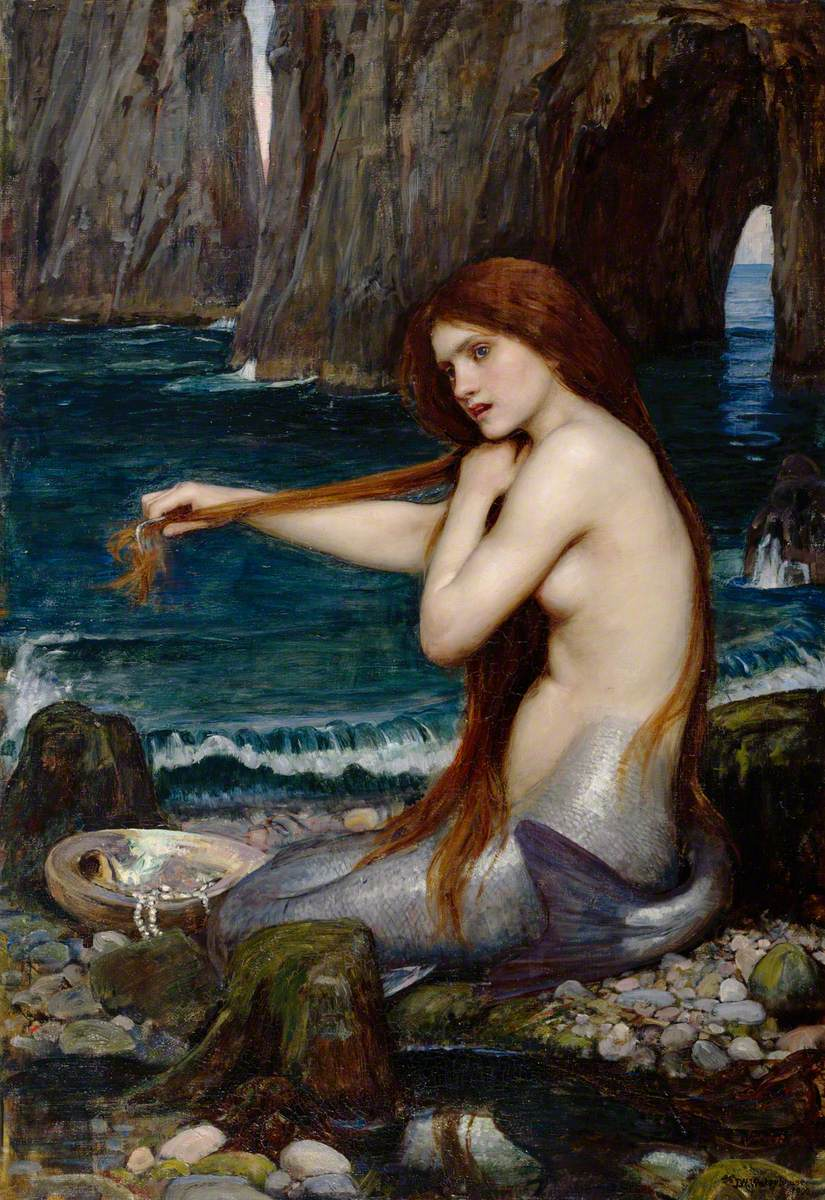
A Mermaid by John William Waterhouse

The Royal Academy Exhibition of 1901 was the hundred and thirty third annual Summer Exhibition of the British Royal Academy of Arts which was held at Burlington House in London's Piccadilly from 6 May to 5 August 1901. It was the first Summer Exhibition to be held since the Death of Queen Victoria in January. Victoria had been on the throne since 1837 and with her death the Edwardian era began. The Queen's passing was widely commemorated at the exhibition and the Annual Dinner was cancelled as a sign of mourning. A whole wall of the gallery was given over to one painting, the 1899 Portrait of Queen Victoria by Jean-Joseph Benjamin-Constant, done so at the request of the new monarch Edward VII.

More than 14,000 artworks were submitted of which only 1,823 made it past the selection committee. It was notable for the absence of the sculptor Alfred Gilbert who had gone bankrupt that year. For this amongst other reasons, the exhibition was considered by The Times to be "by common consent a good deal below the standard of last year". John William Waterhouse displayed his diploma work that he had presented to the Royal Academy A Mermaid. Albert Goodwin's Ali Baba and the Forty Thieves was purchased by the Tate Gallery as part of the Chantrey Bequest. The Flower Girl by James Jebusa Shannon was also through the Chantrey Bequest. As often, John Singer Sargent's portraits attracted critical attention. John Collier displayed a portrait of the Duke of York, the future George V. John Seymour Lucas exhibited Clouds That Gather Round the Setting Sun a history painting featuring the imminent downfall of Cardinal Wolsey in Tudor England. The First Commission by Margaret Isabel Dicksee depicted a scene from the childhood of the painter Thomas Lawrence.

== Gallery ==
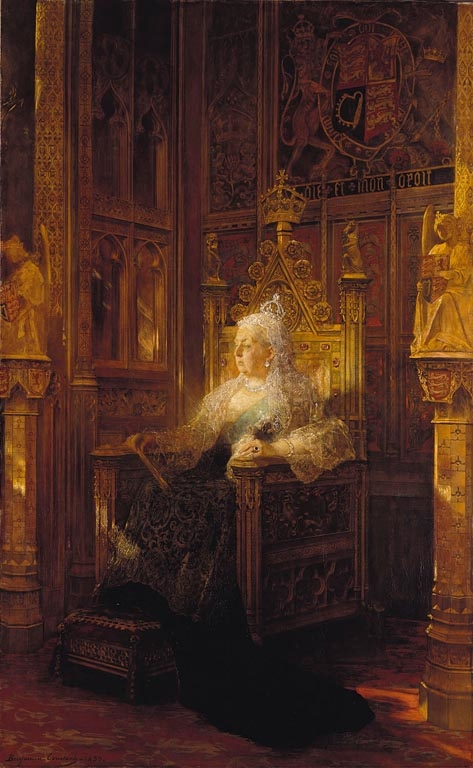
Portrait of Queen Victoria by Jean-Joseph Benjamin-Constant

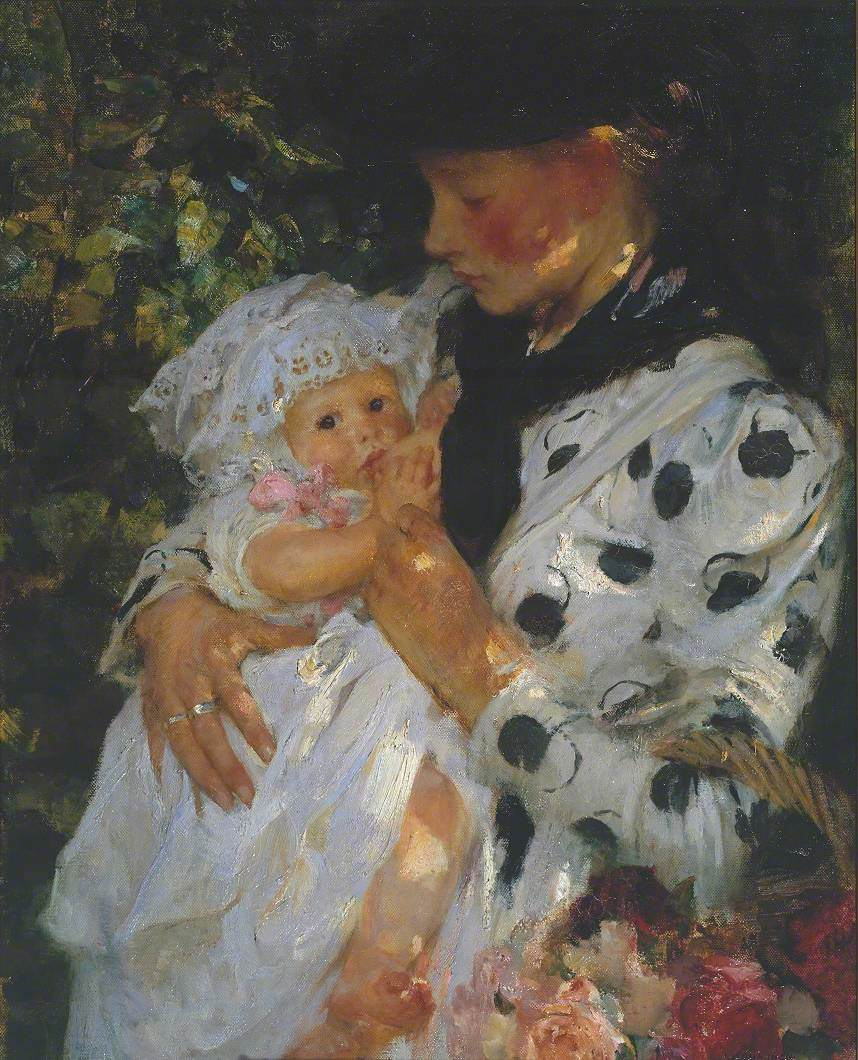
The Flower Girl by James Jebusa Shannon

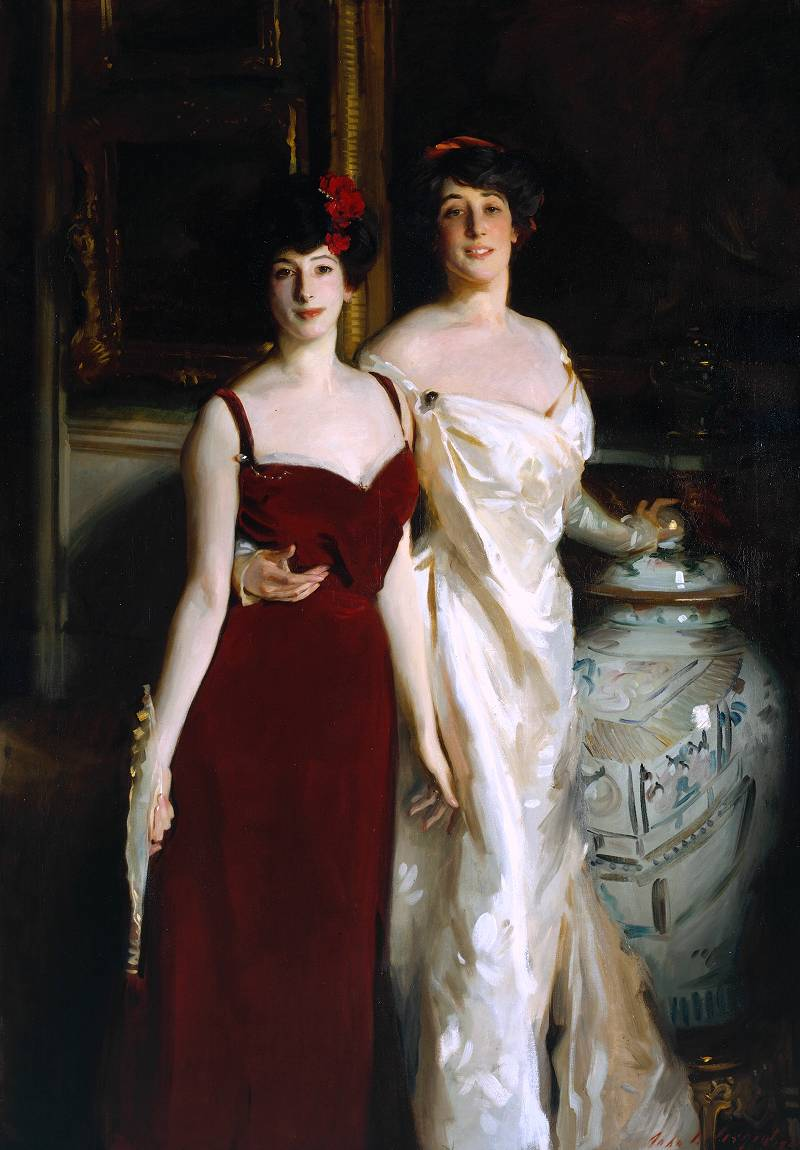
Ena and Betty Wertheimer by John Singer Sargent

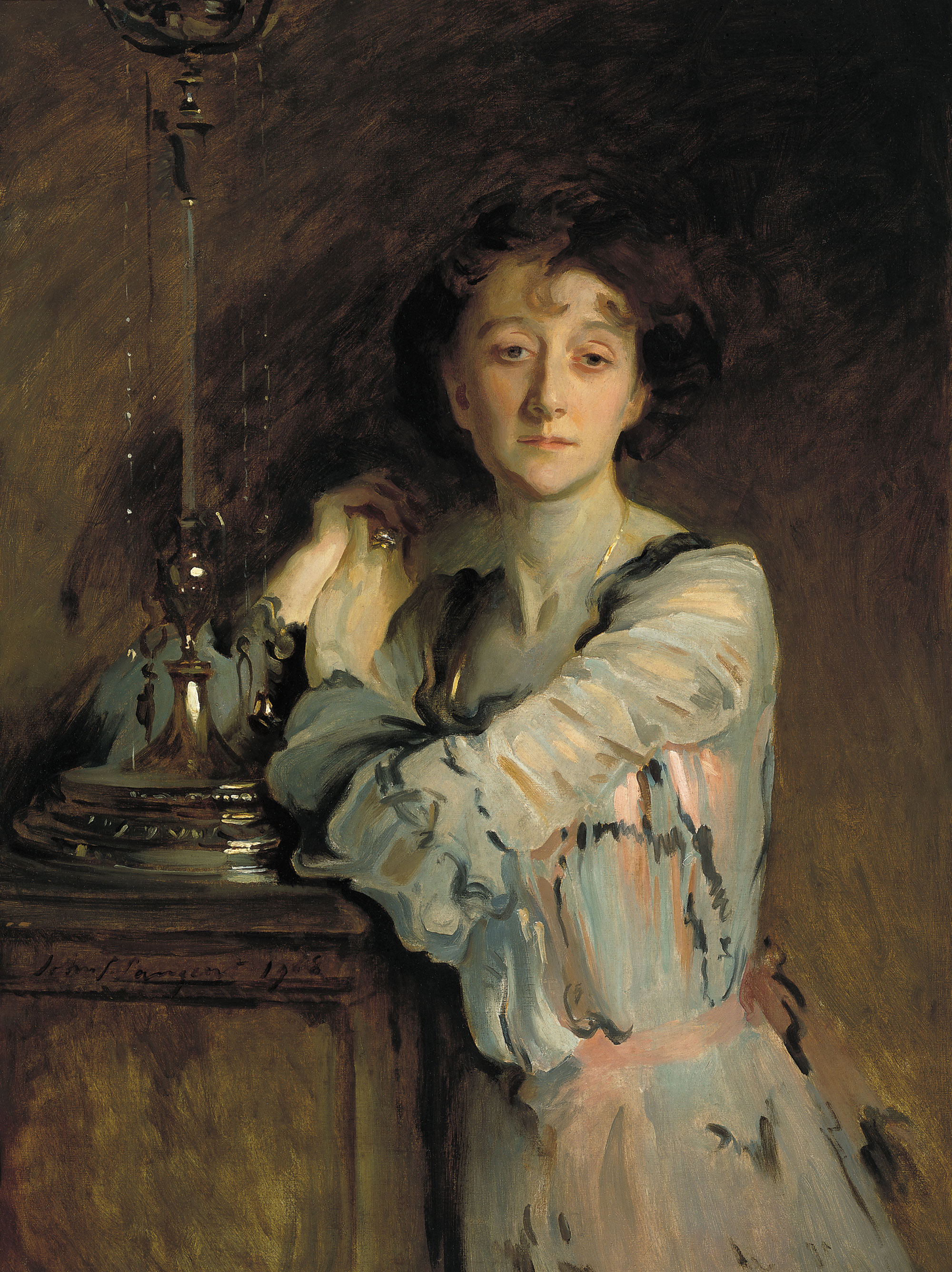
Portrait of Honorable Mrs Charles Russell by John Singer Sargent

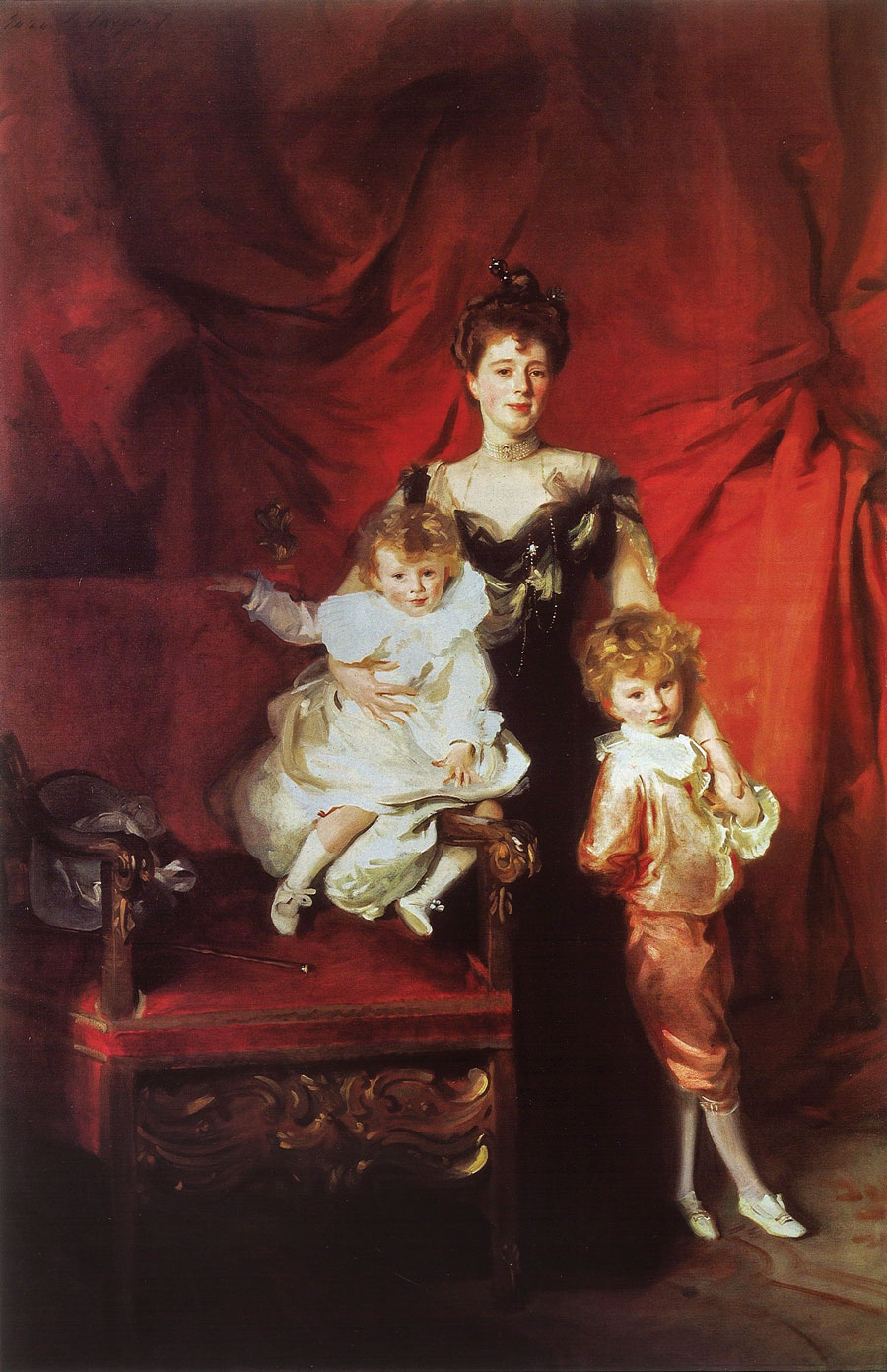
Mrs Cazalet and Children by John Singer Sargent

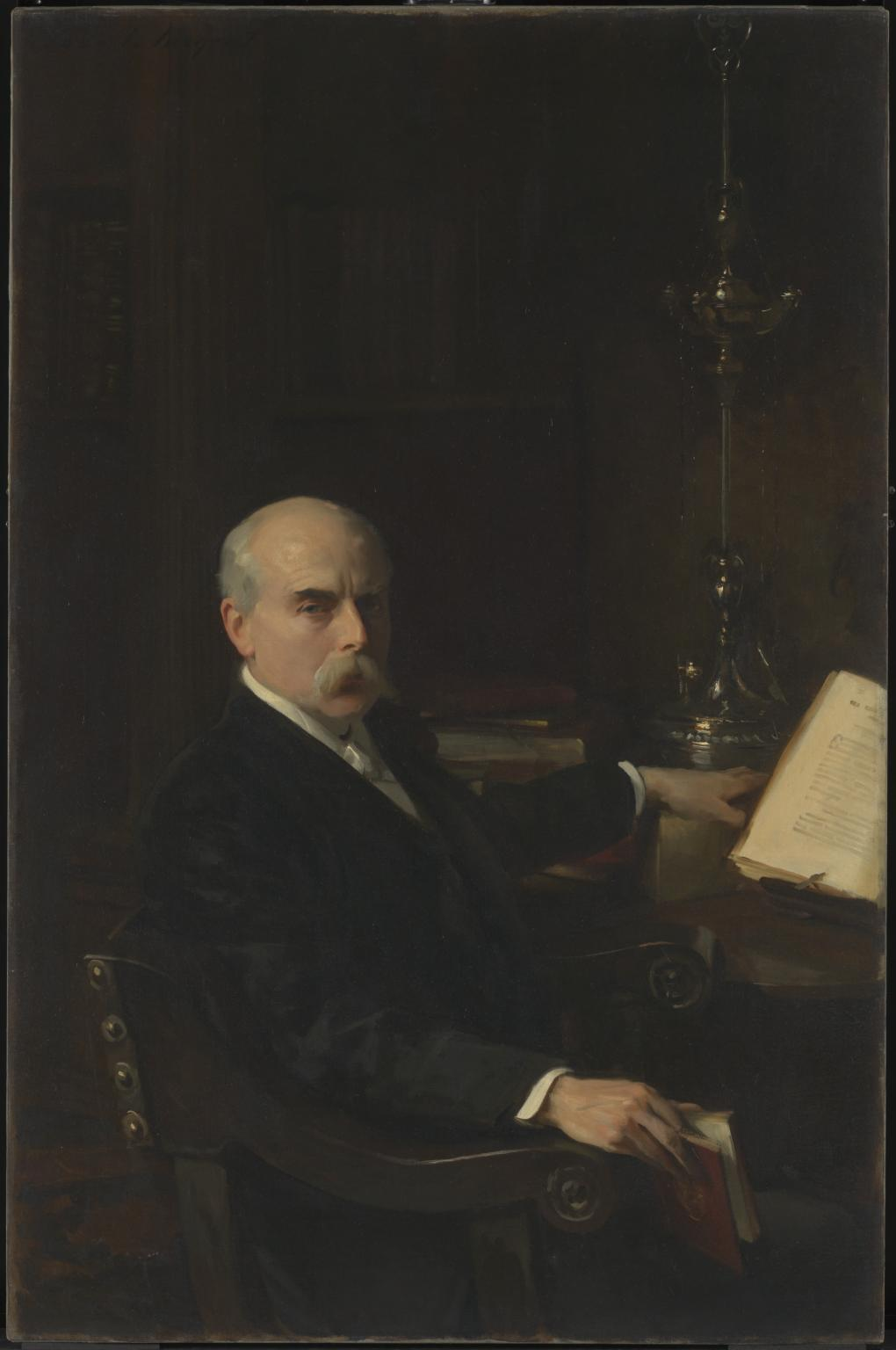
Portrait of Ingram Bywater by John Singer Sargent

The King's Rival by John Seymour Lucas

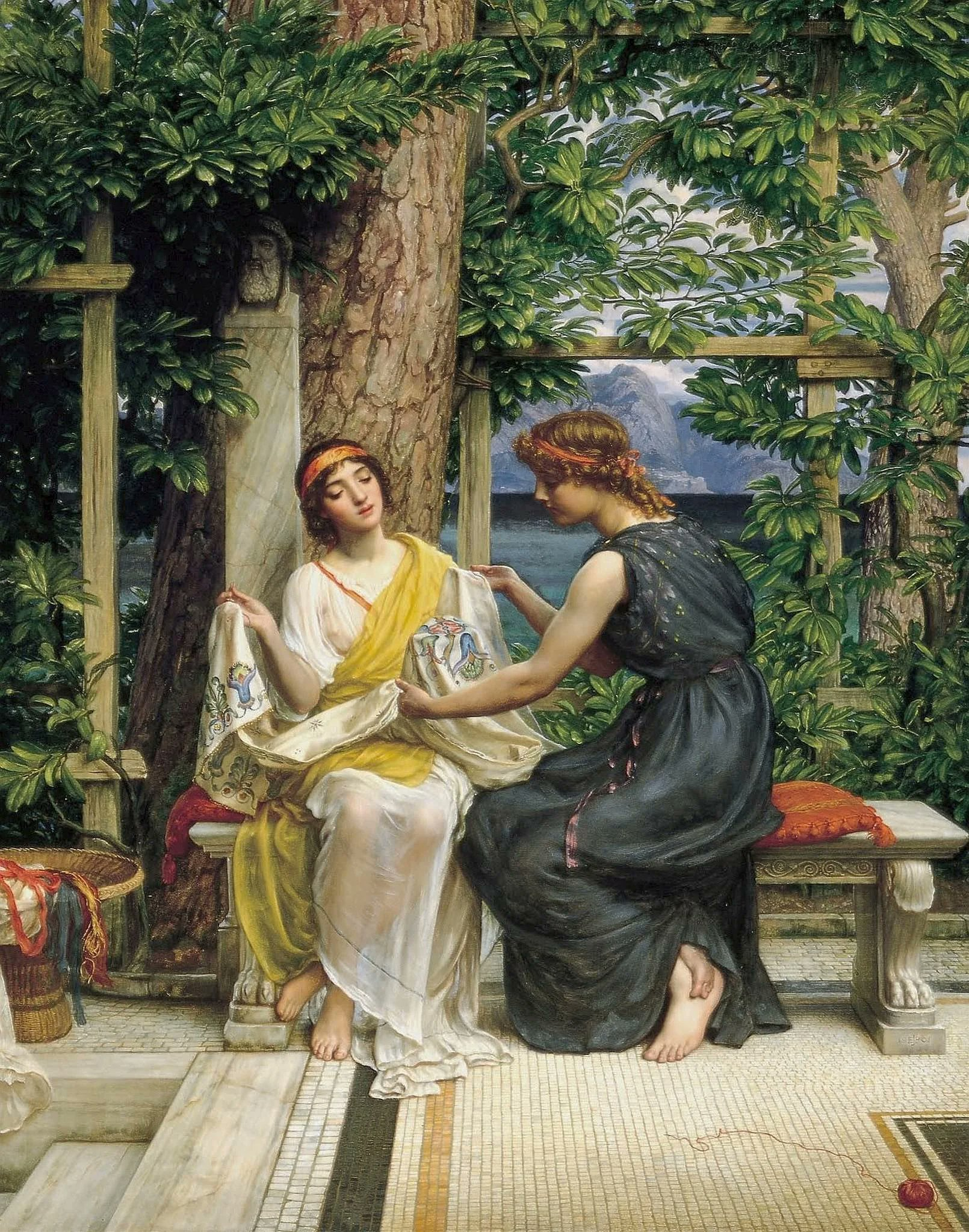
Helena and Hermia by Edward Poynter

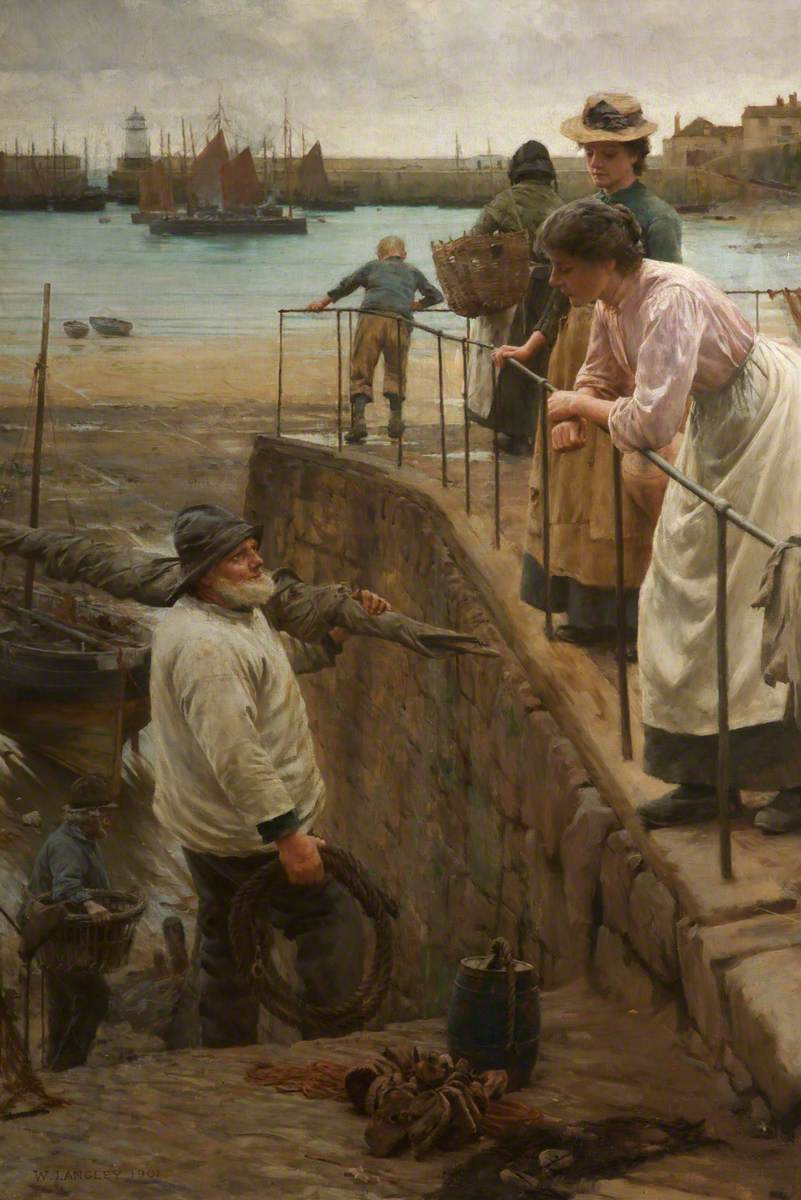
Between the Tides by Walter Langley

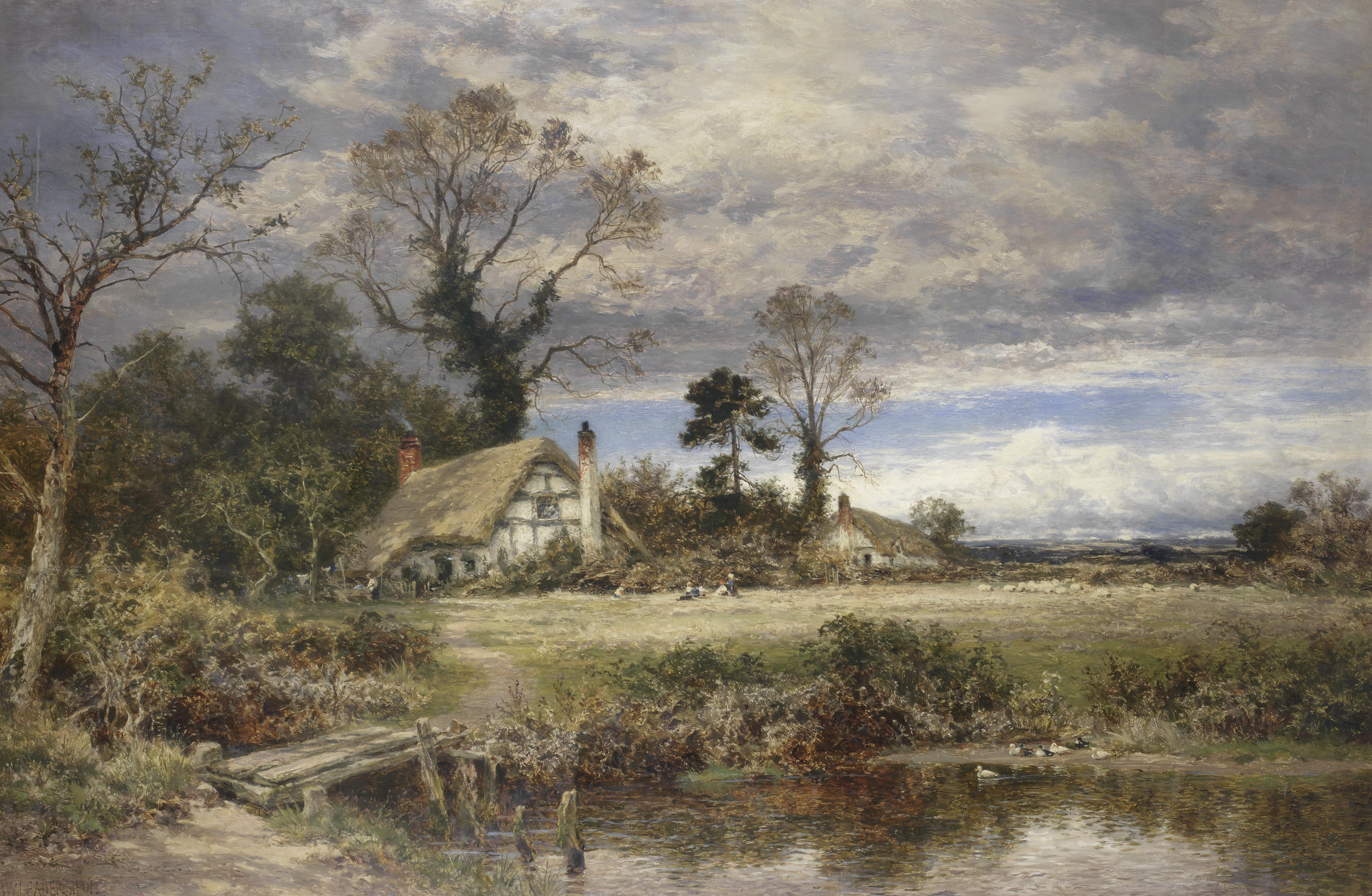
A Gleam Before the Storm by Benjamin Williams Leader

The Golden Barn by George Clausen

The Garden of Eden by Hugh Goldwin Rivière

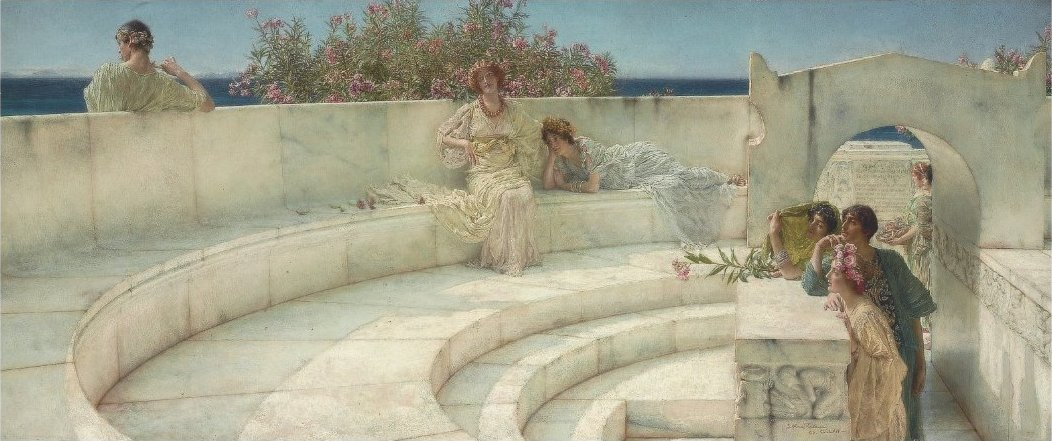
Under the Roof of Blue Ionian Weather by Lawrence Alma-Tadema

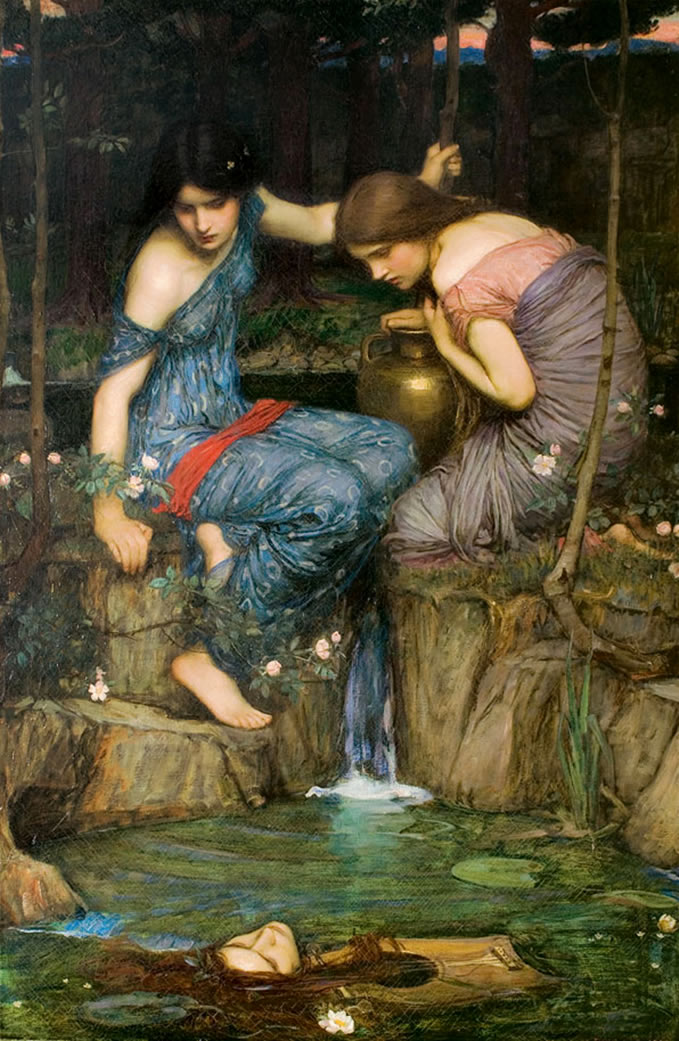
Nymphs Finding the Head of Orpheus by John William Waterhouse

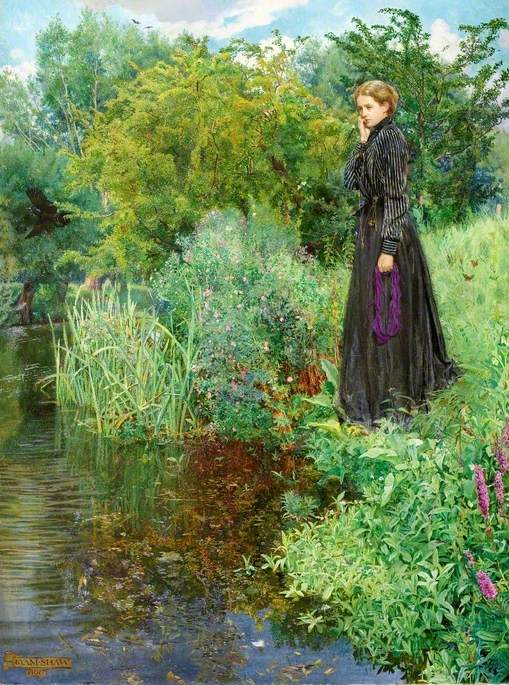
Boer War, Last Summer Things Were Greener by Byam Shaw

To the Hills by Briton Riviere

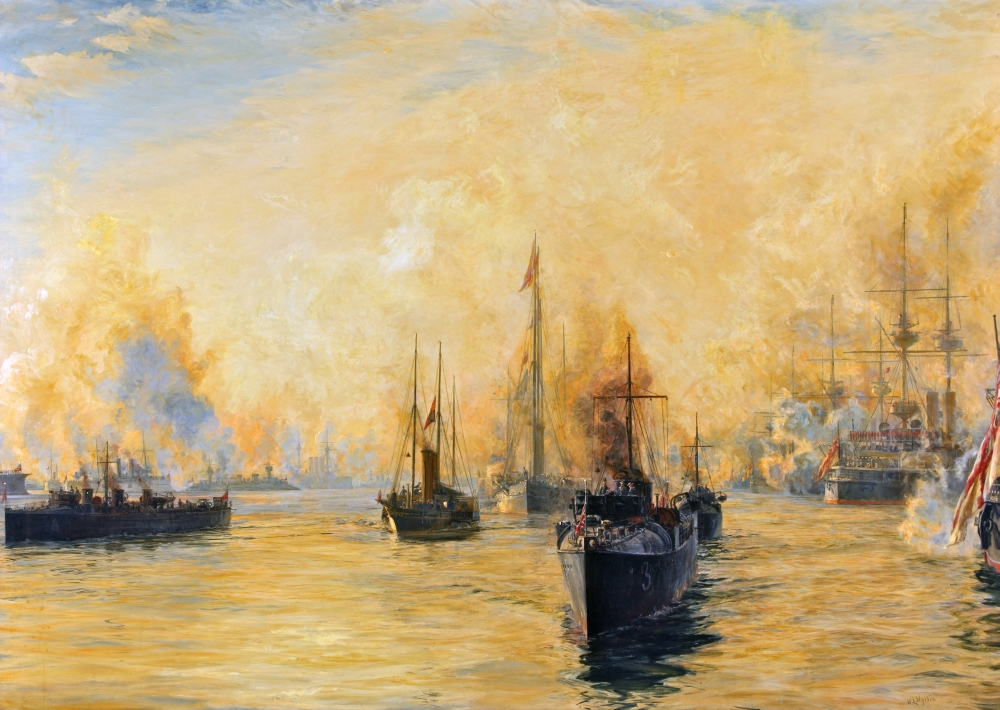
The Passing of a Great Queen by William Lionel Wyllie

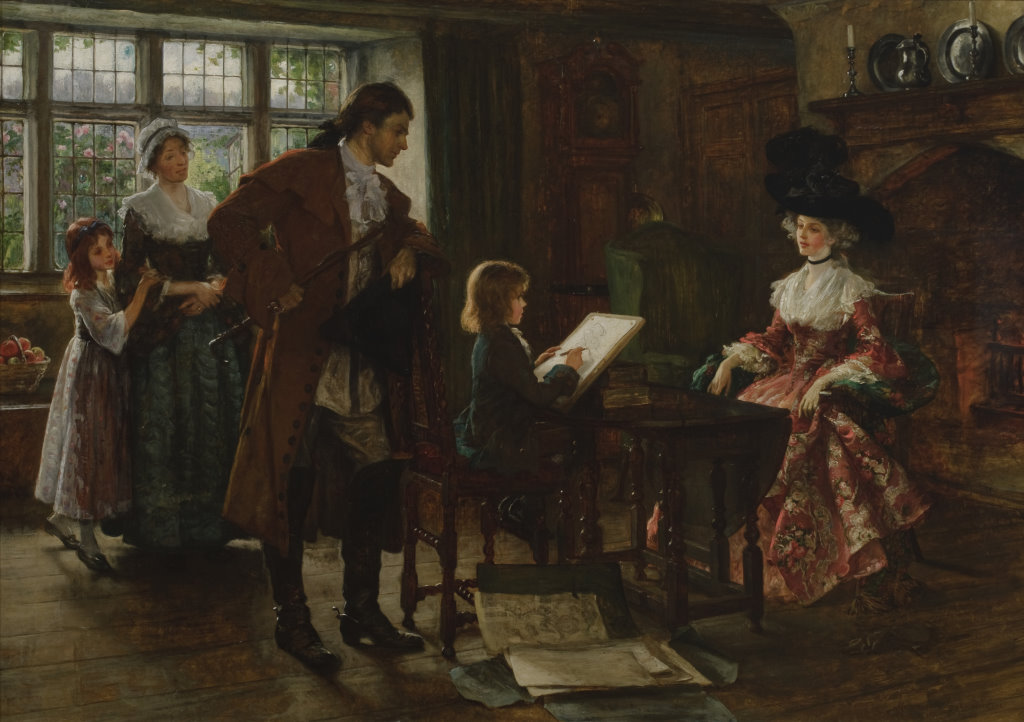
The First Commission by Margaret Isabel Dicksee

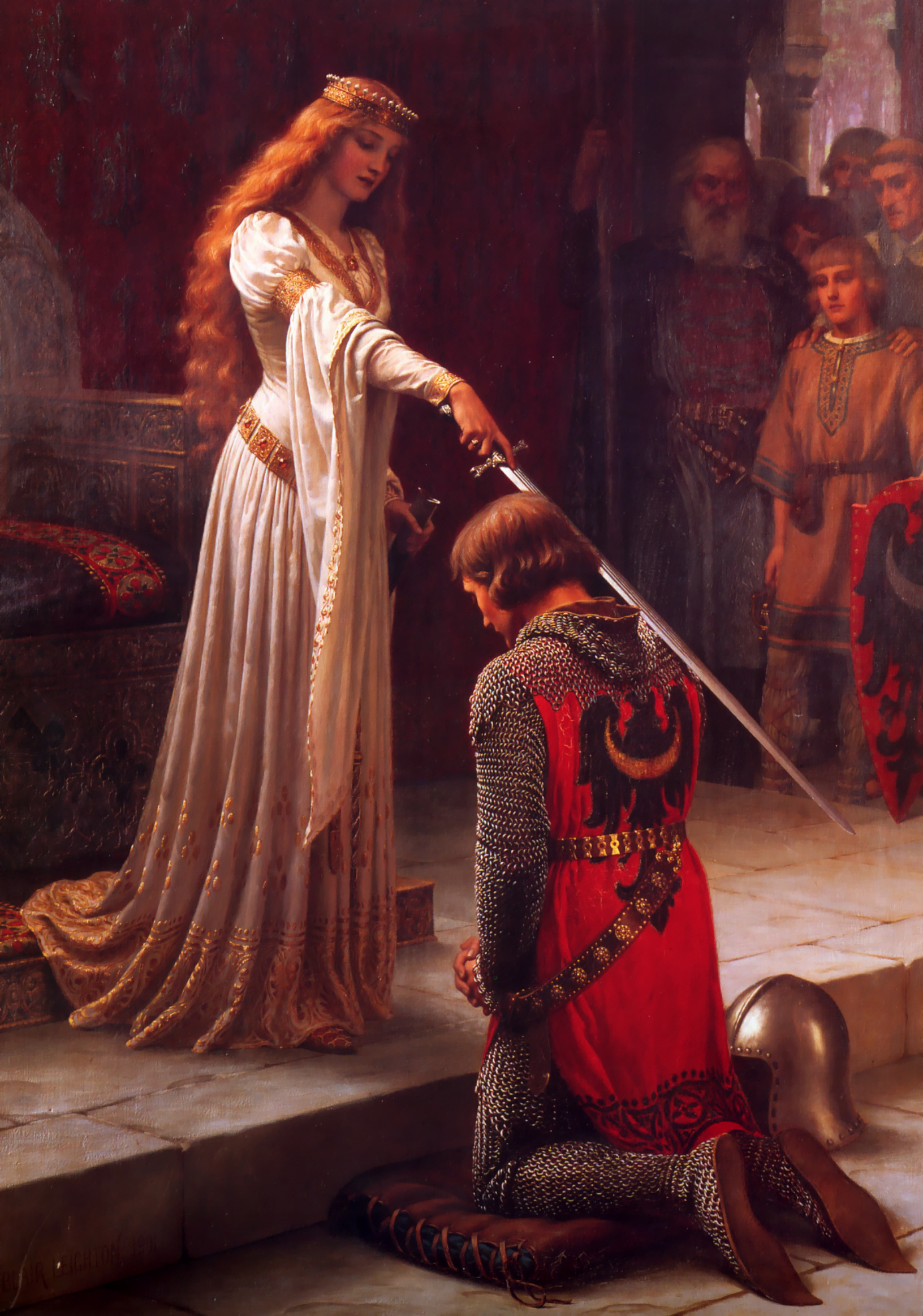
The Accolade by Edmund Blair Leighton

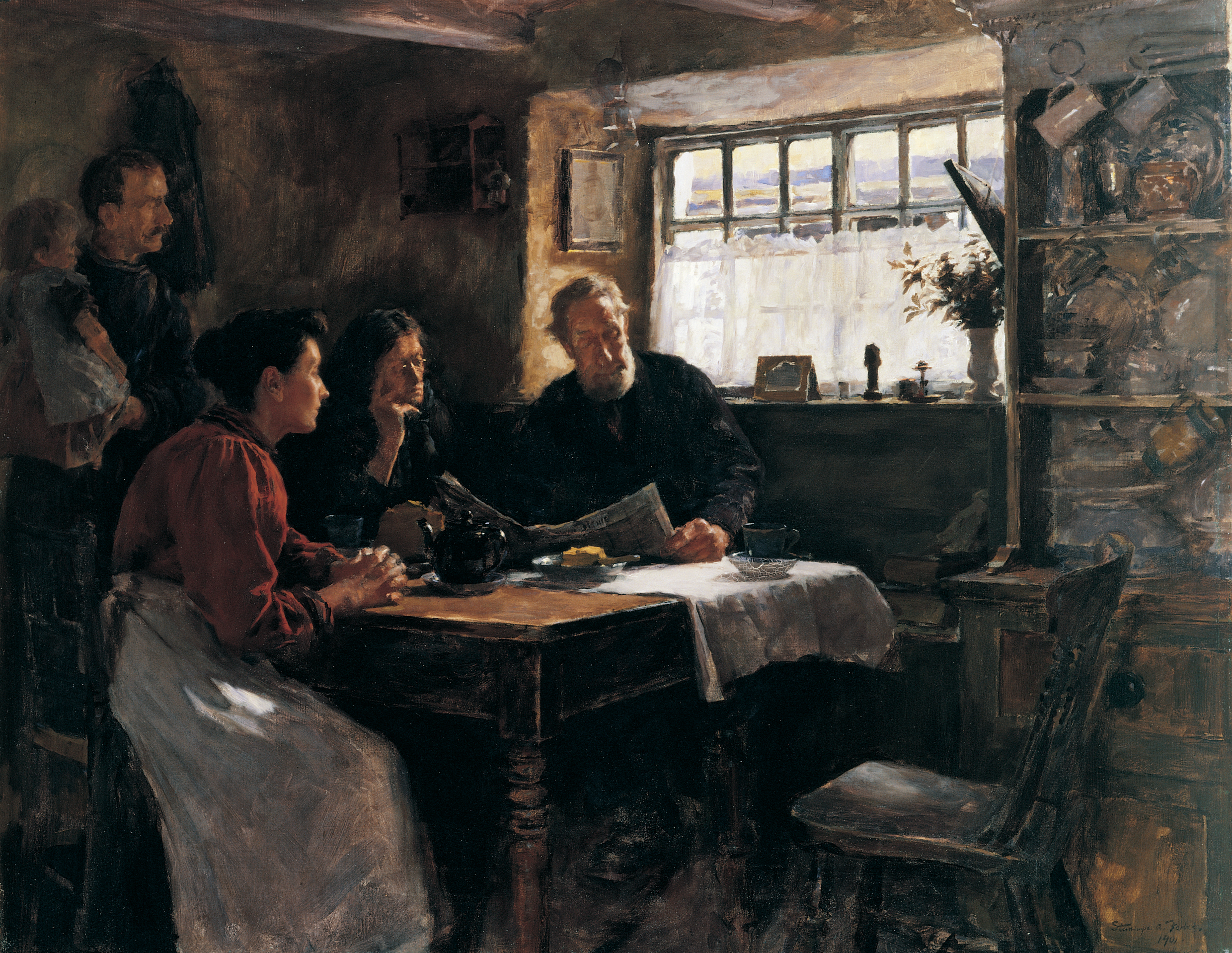
The 22nd January 1901 by Stanhope Forbes

Off to Skibbereen by Stanhope Forbes

The Home Wind by Charles Napier Hemy

The Weald of Surrey by Benjamin Williams Leader

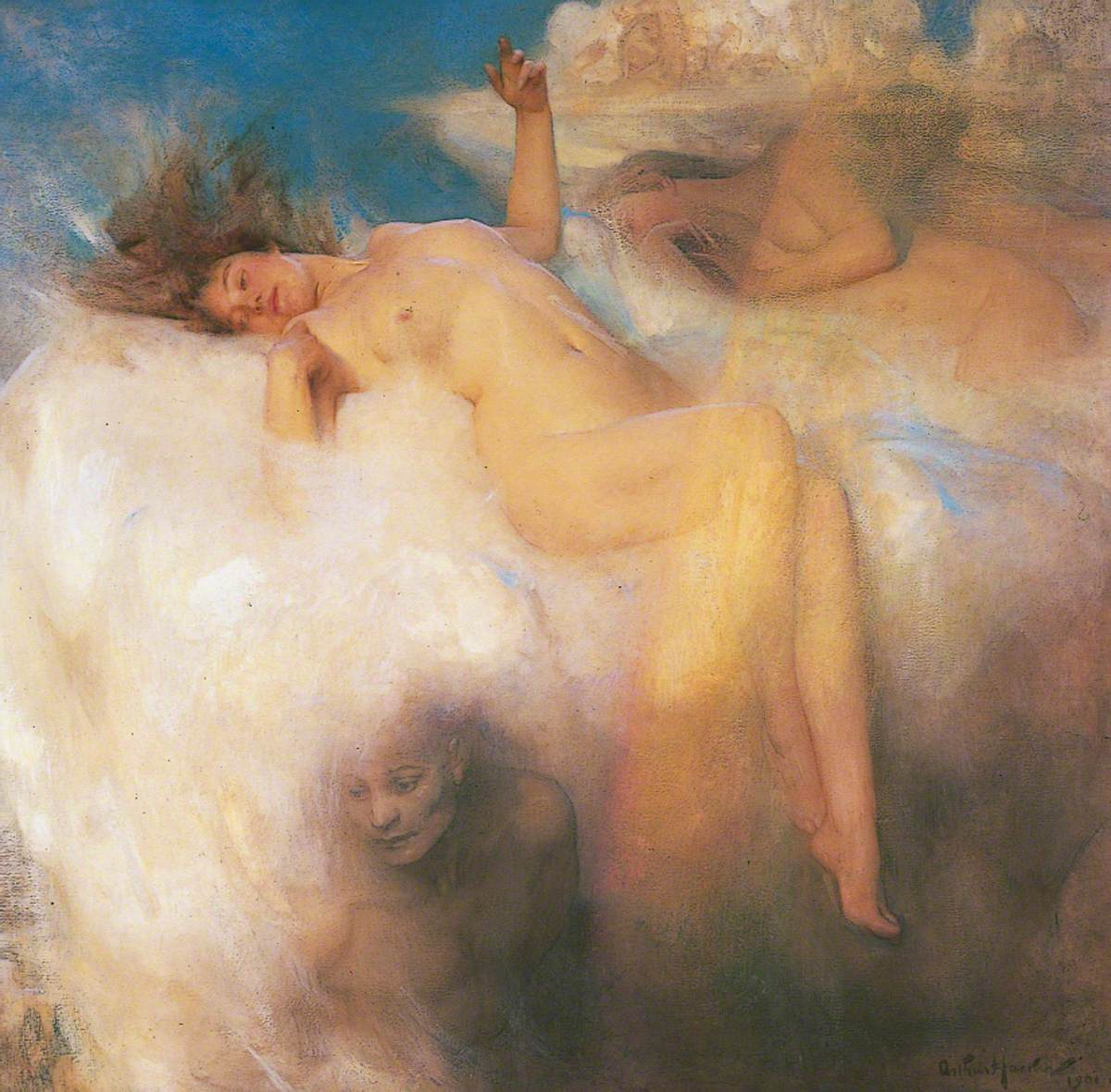
The Cloud by Arthur Hacker

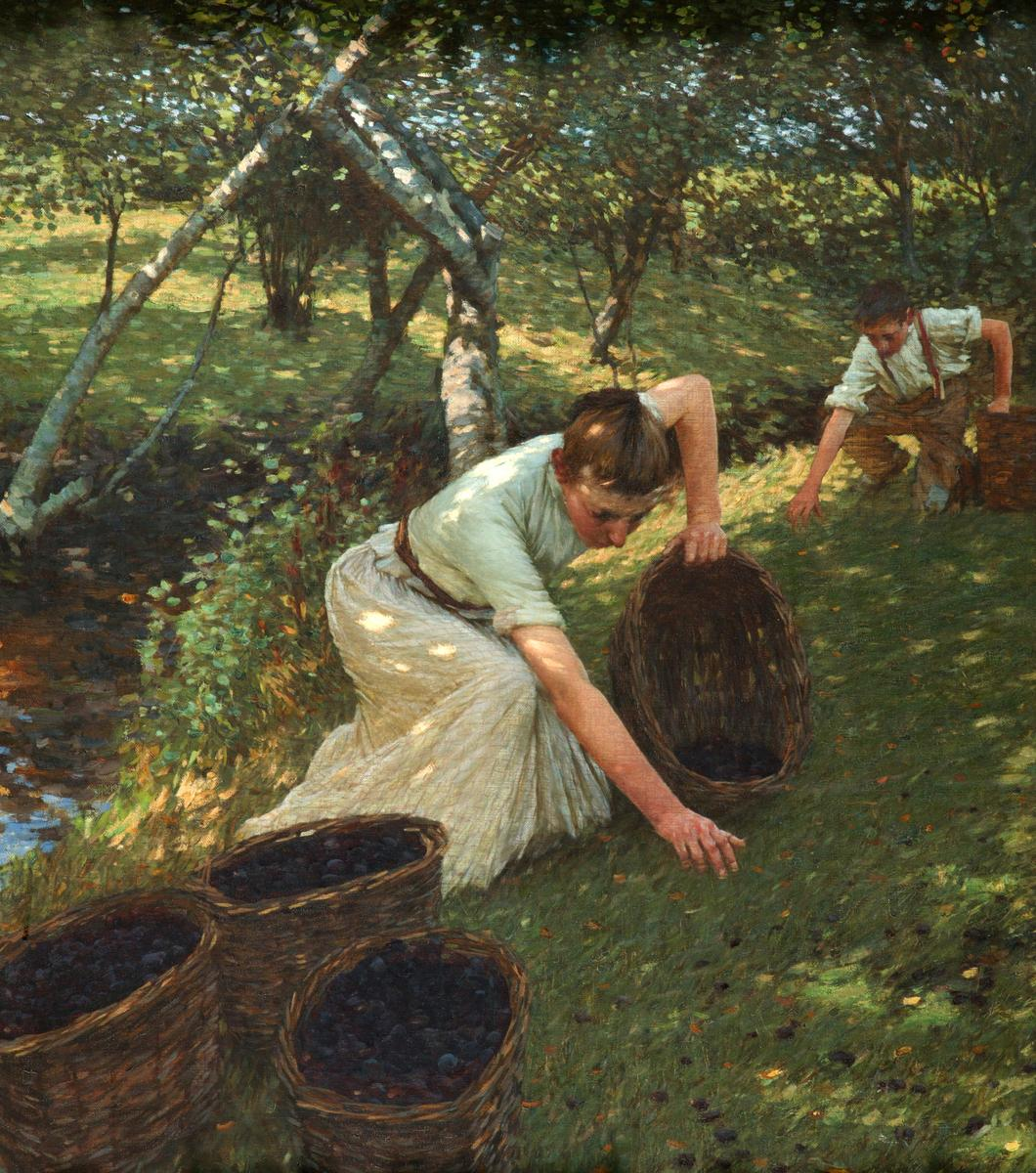
Gathering Plums by Henry Herbert La Thangue

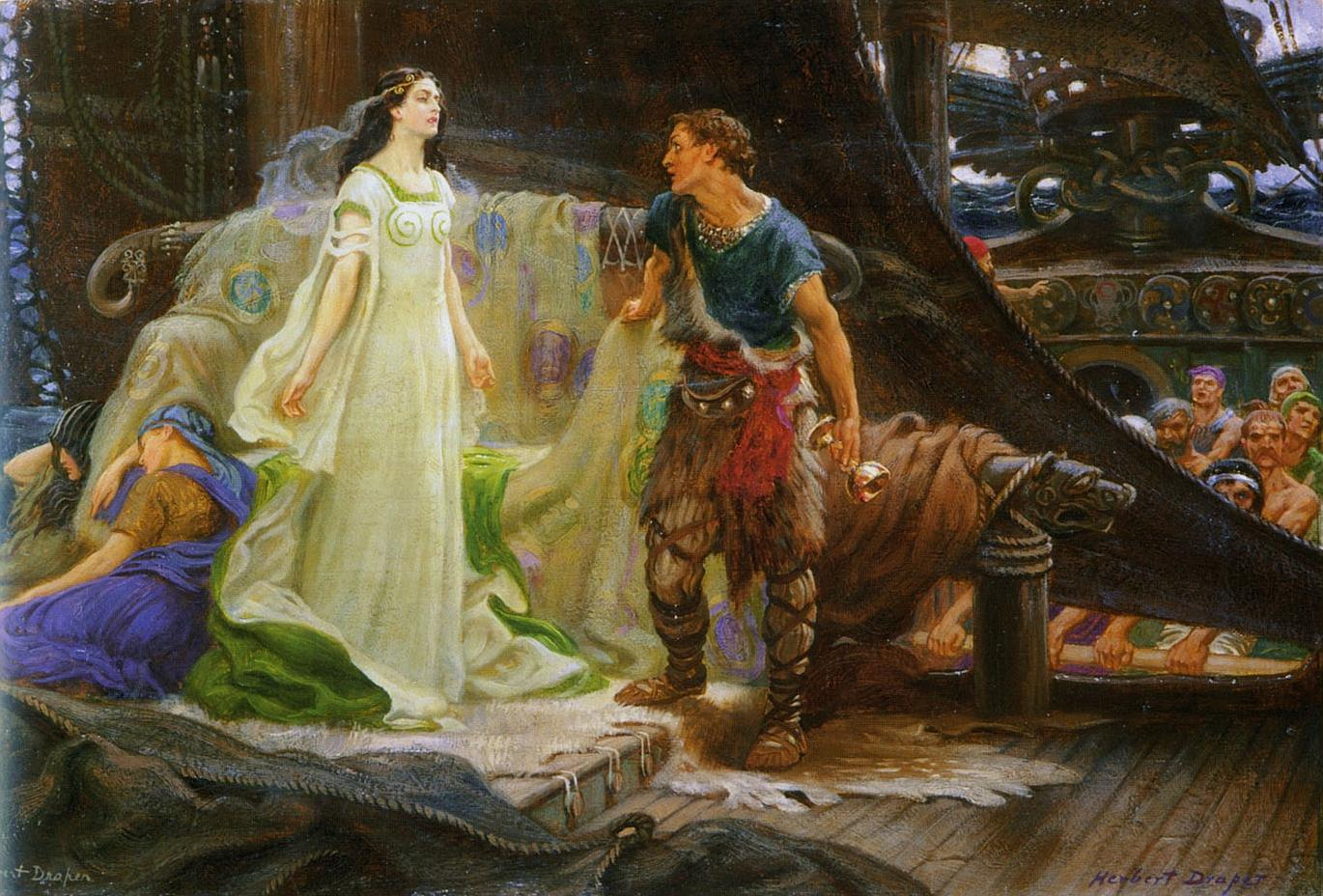
Tristan and Isolde by Herbert James Draper

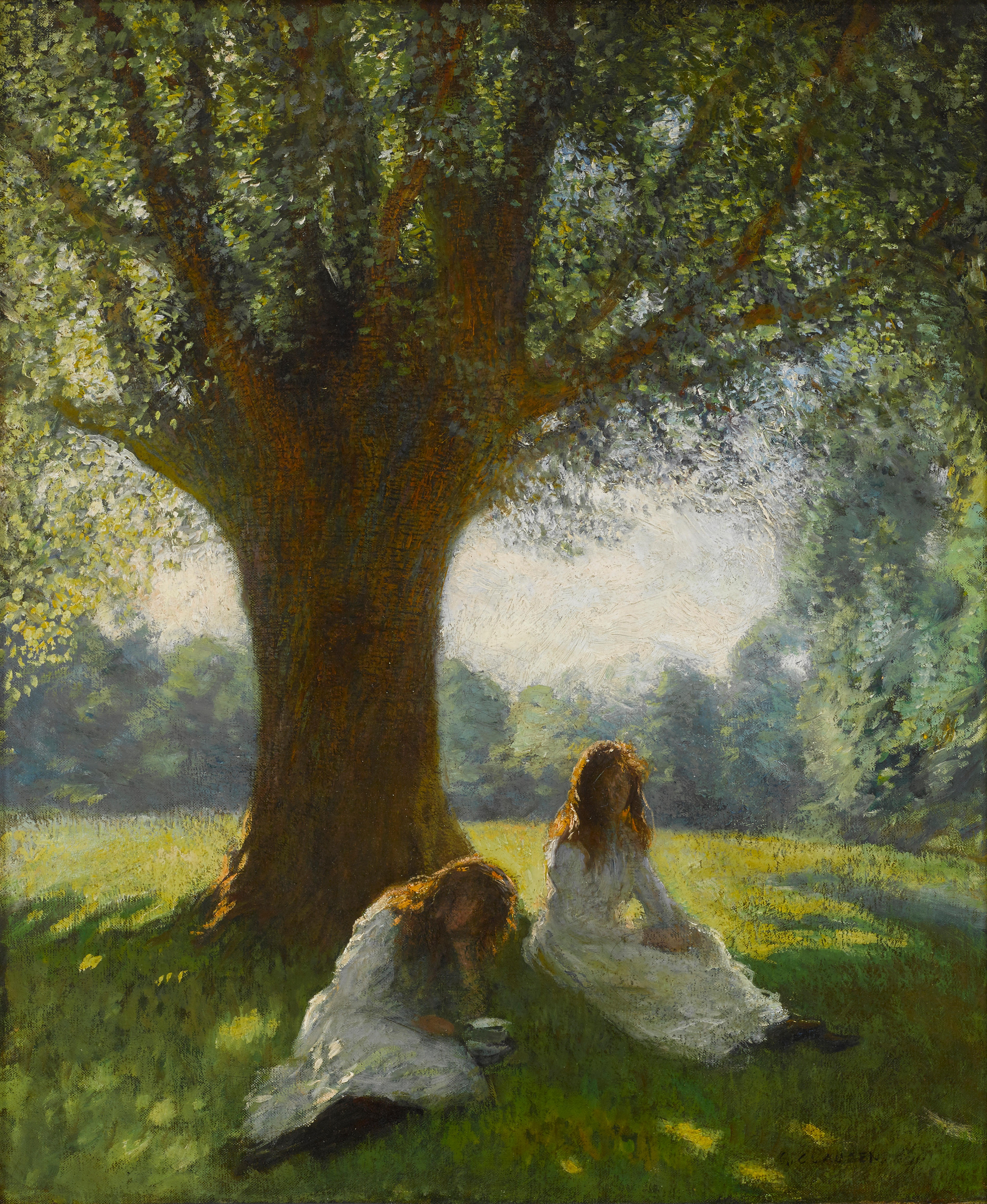
The Spreading Tree by George Clausen

Ali Baba and the Forty Thieves by Albert Goodwin

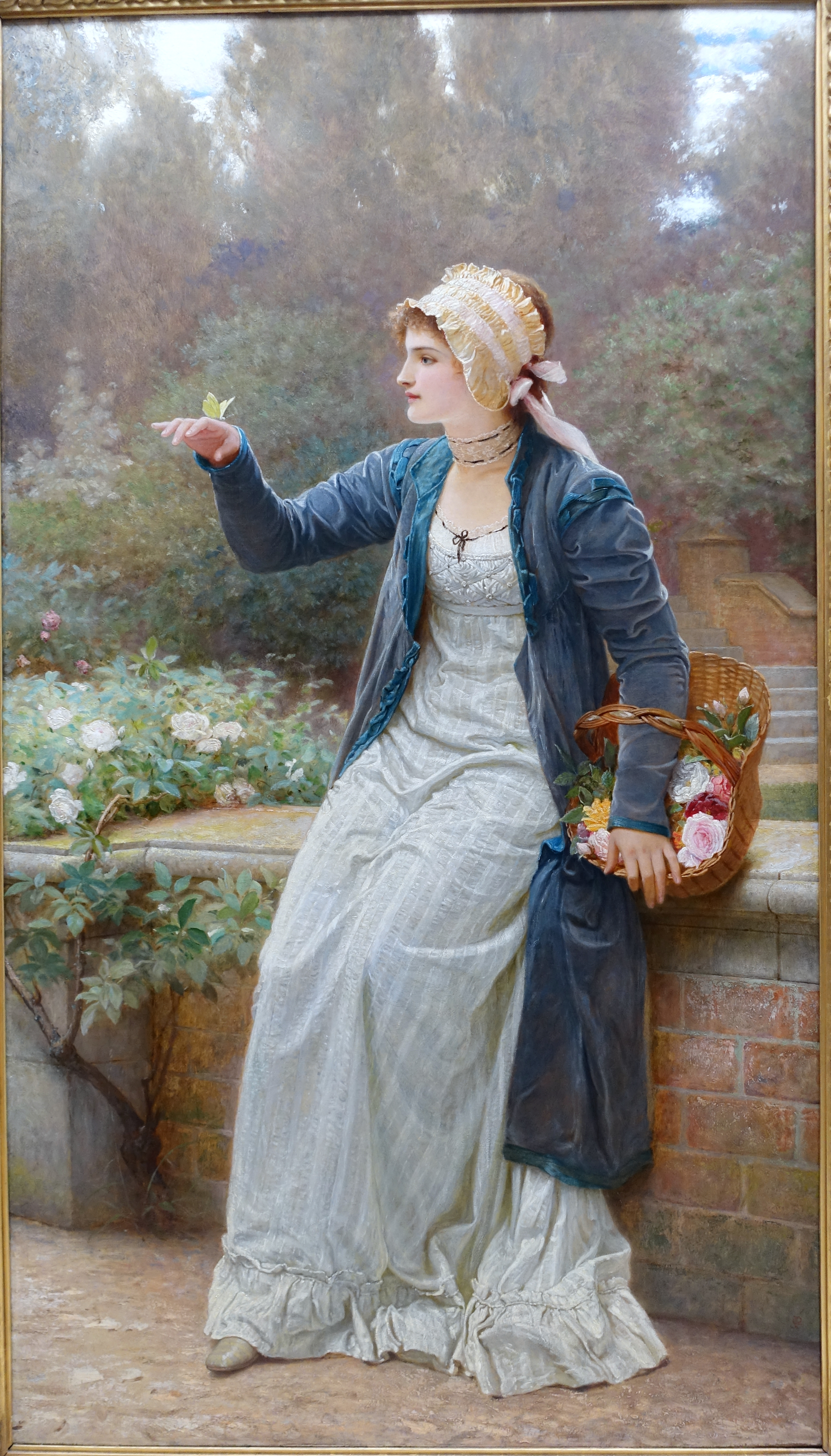
Ephemeral Joy by Charles Edward Perugini

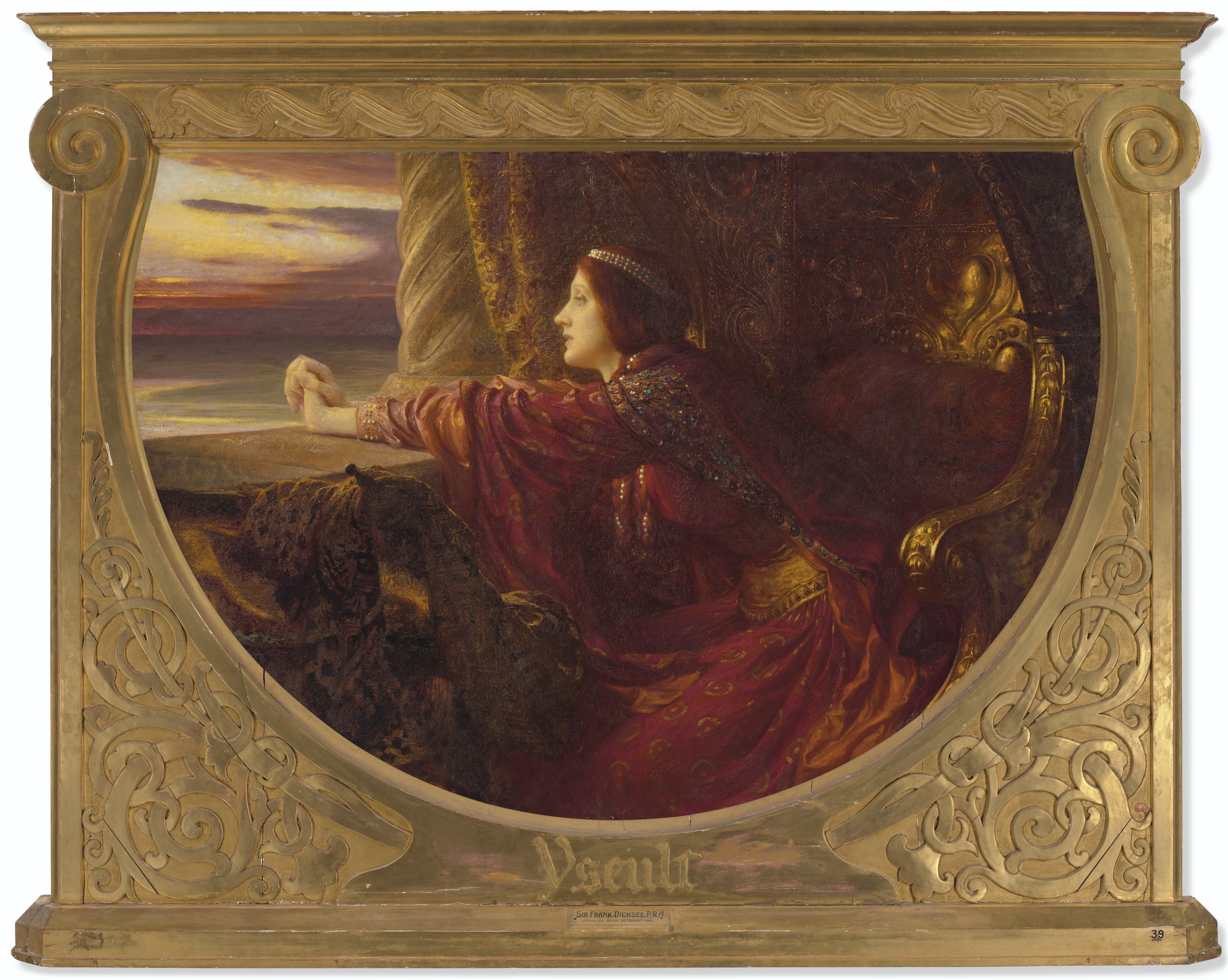
Yseult by Frank Dicksee

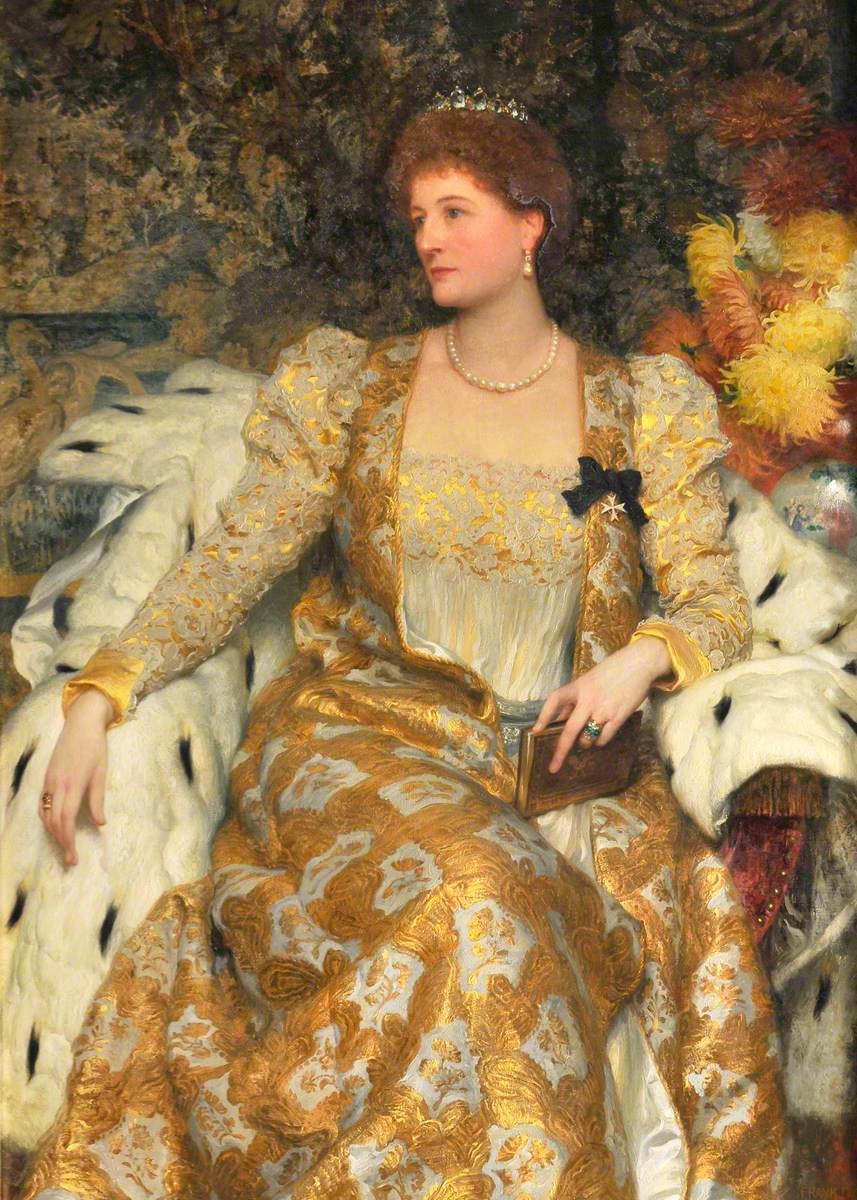
Portrait of the Duchess of Buckingham by Frank Dicksee

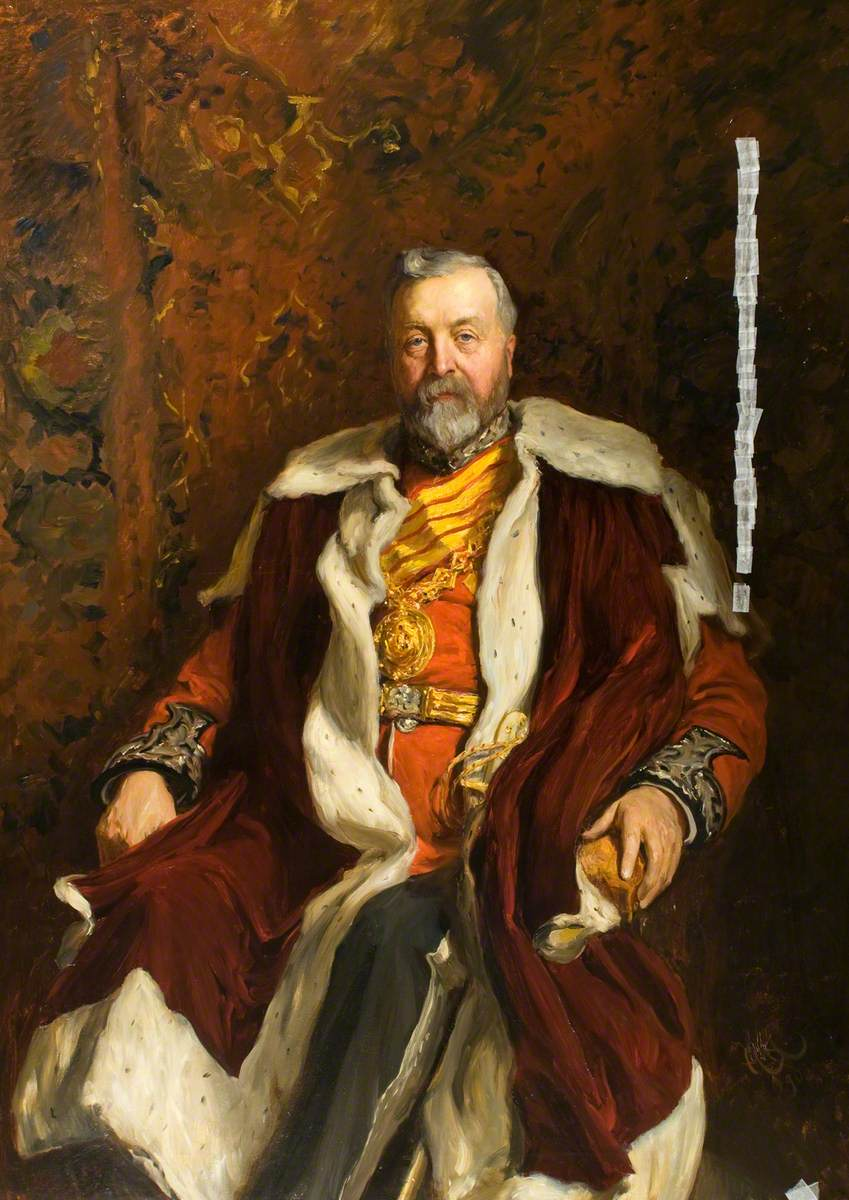
Portrait of Henry McGrady by Hubert von Herkomer

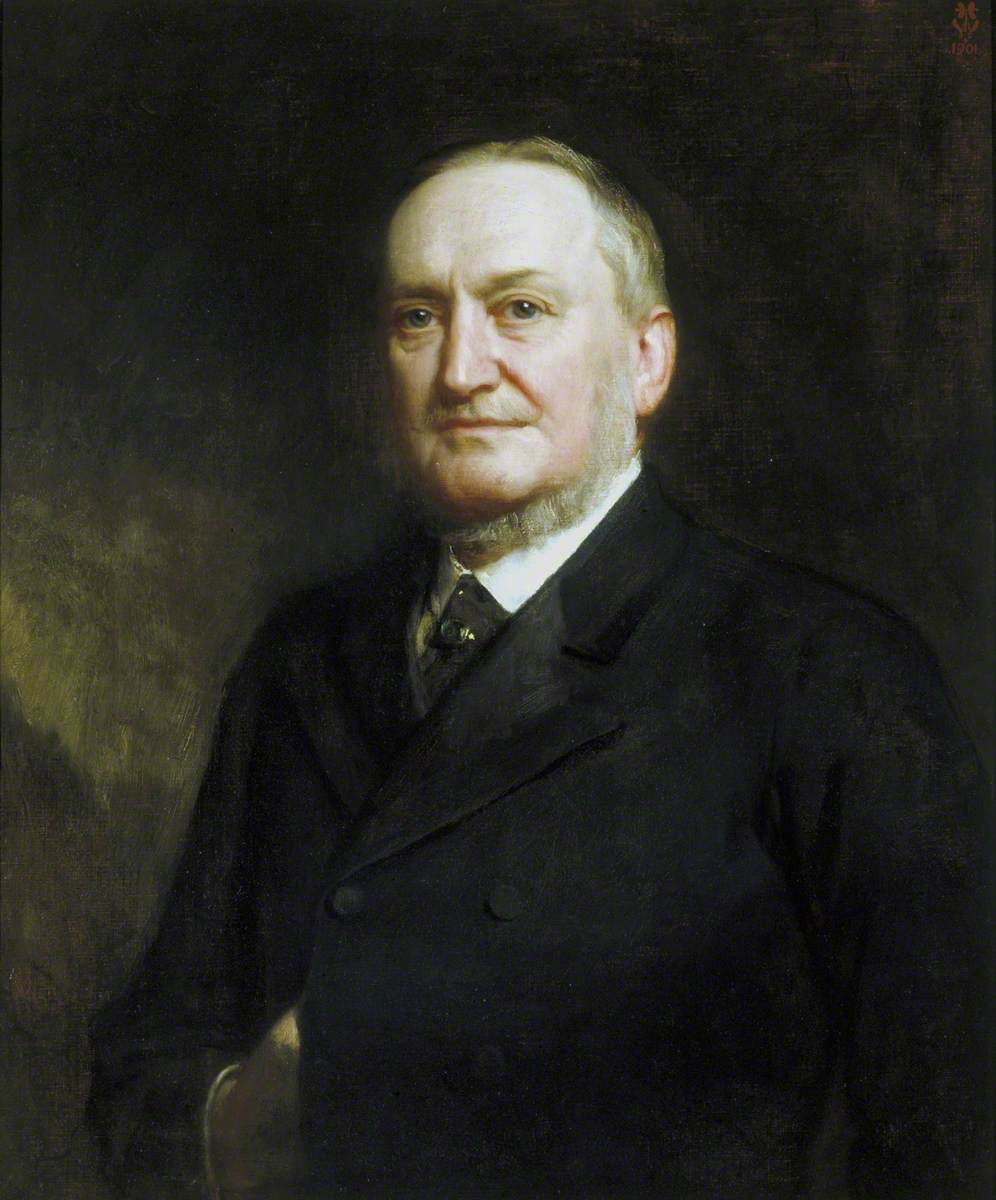
Portrait of John Donnelly by Henry Tanworth Wells

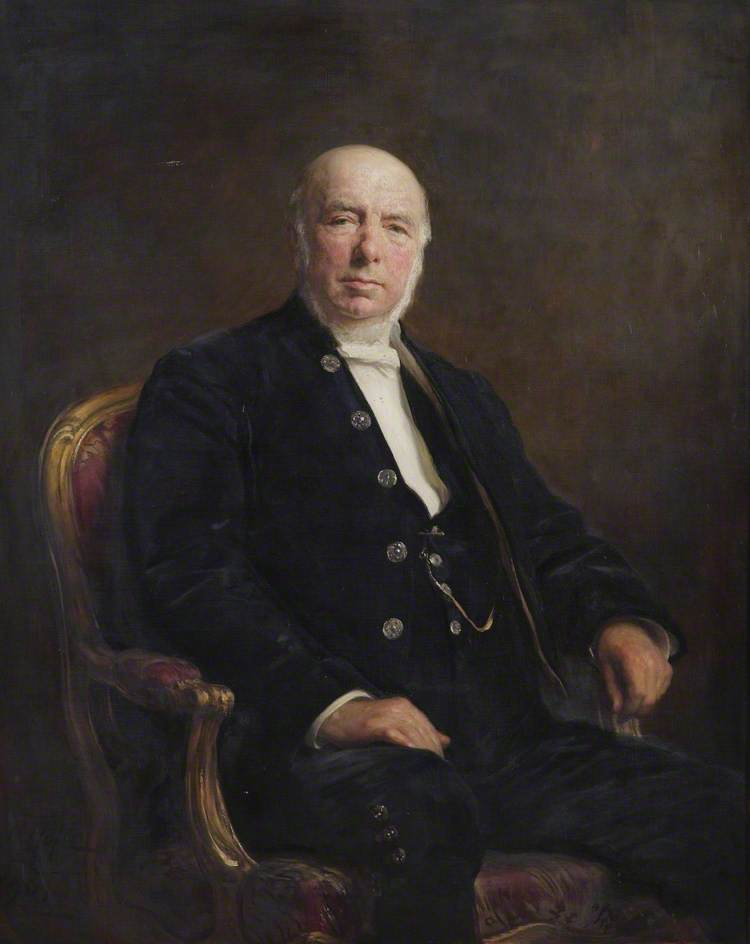
Portrait of Benjamin Hingley by Arthur Stockdale Cope

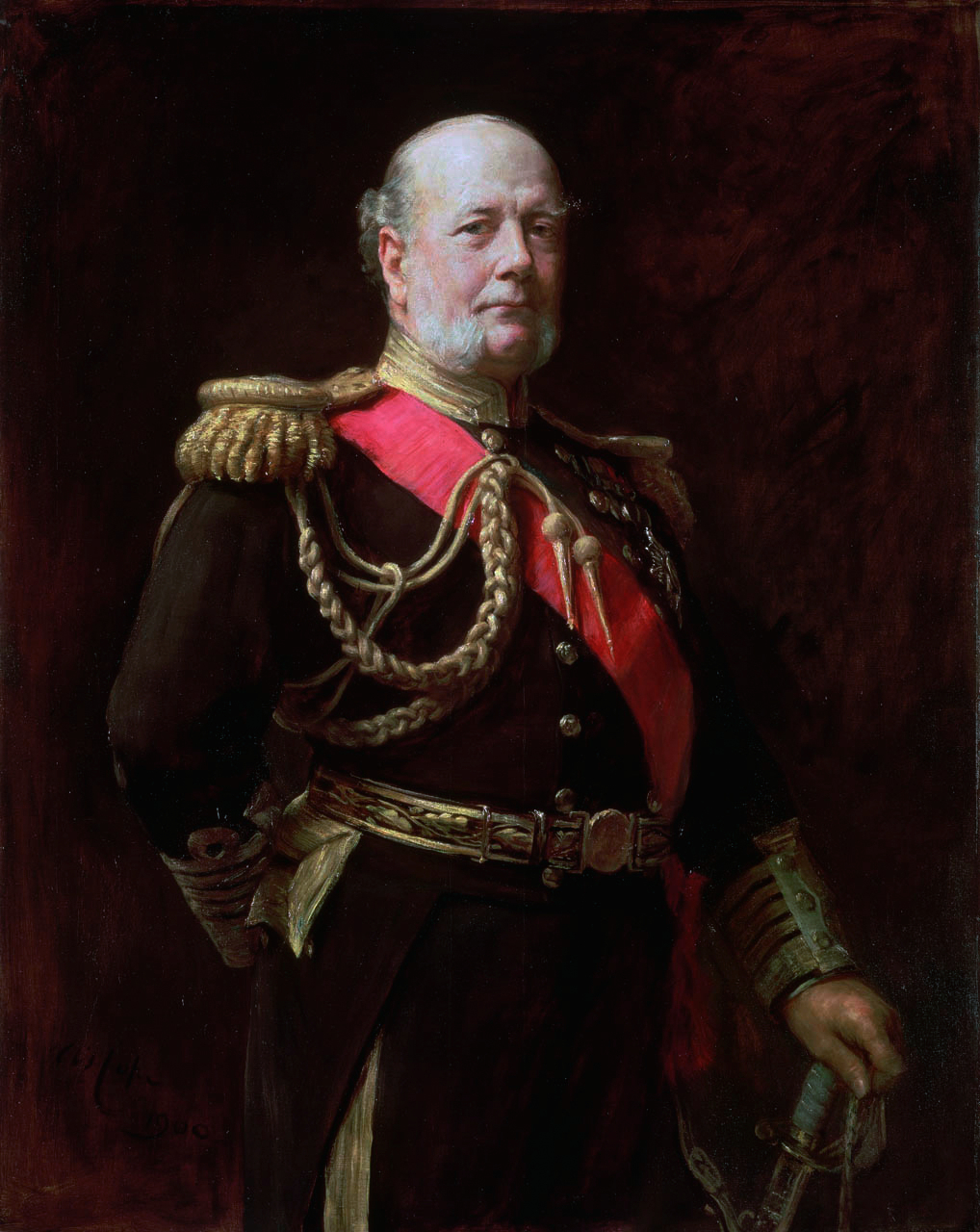
Portrait of Frederick Richards by Arthur Stockdale Cope

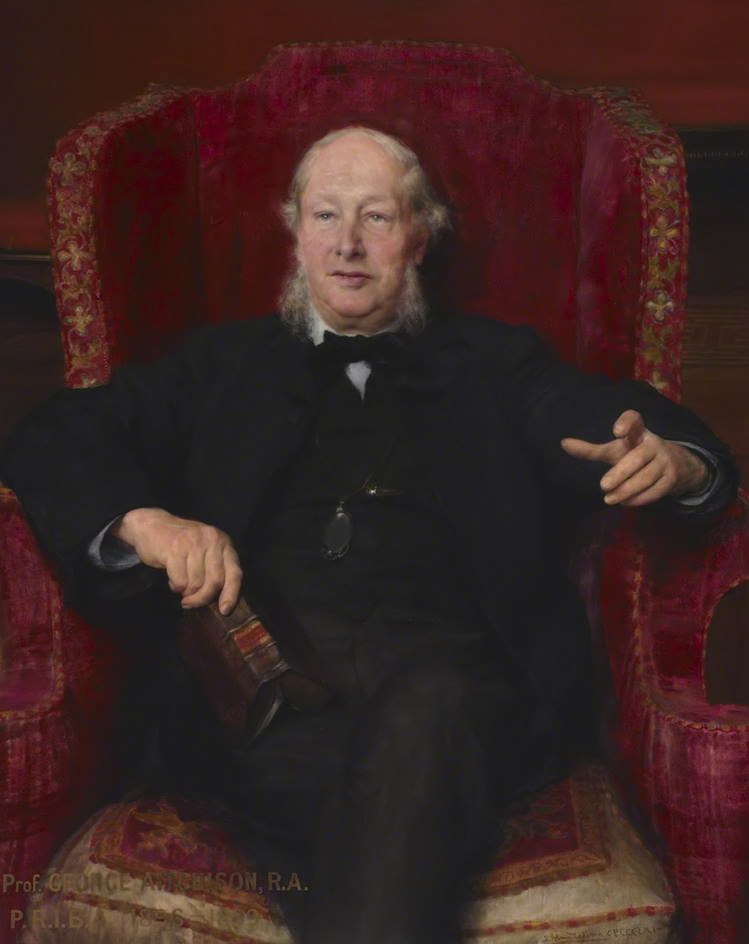
Portrait of George Aitchison by Lawrence Alma-Tadema

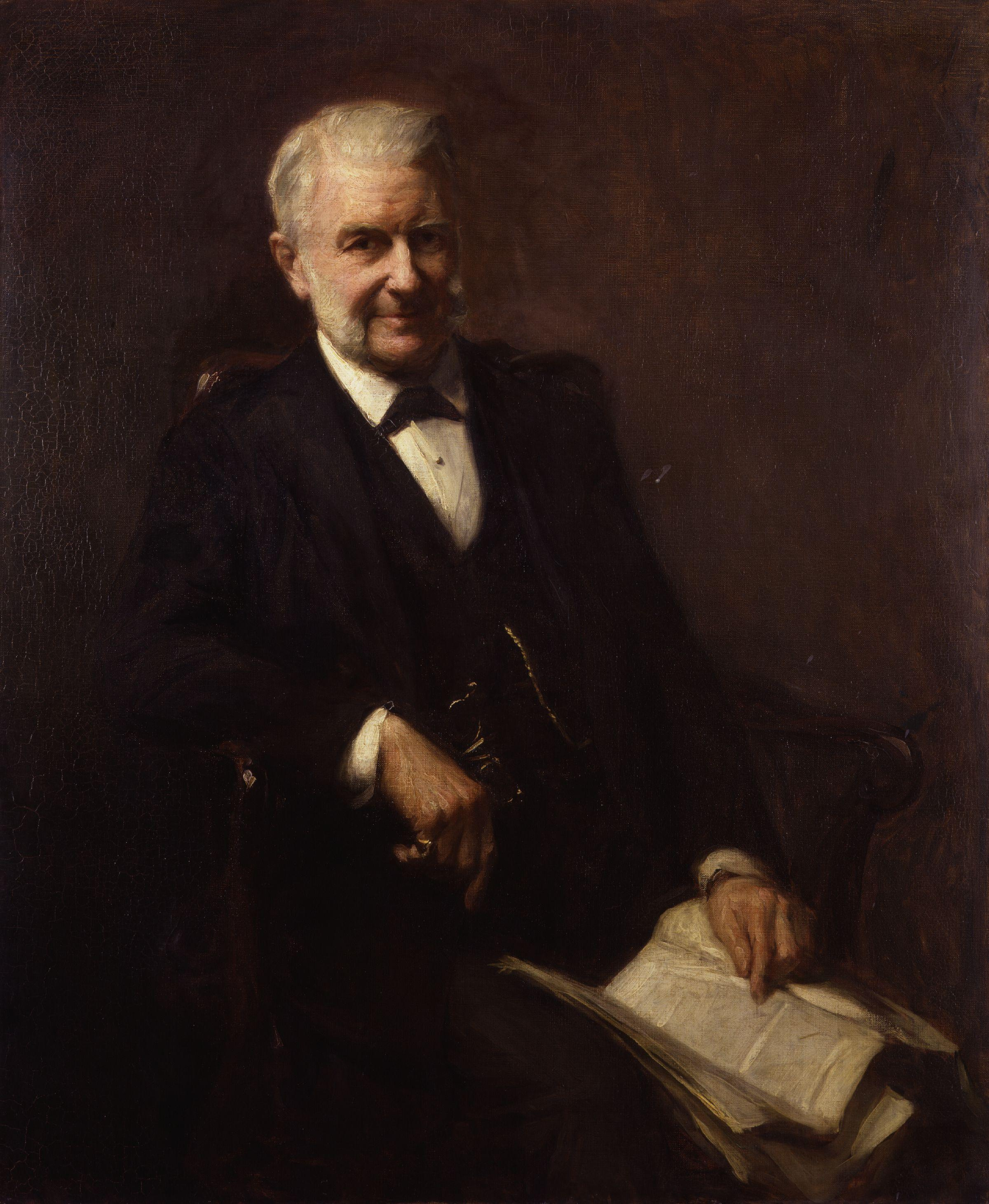
Portrait of Frederick Abel by Frank Bramley

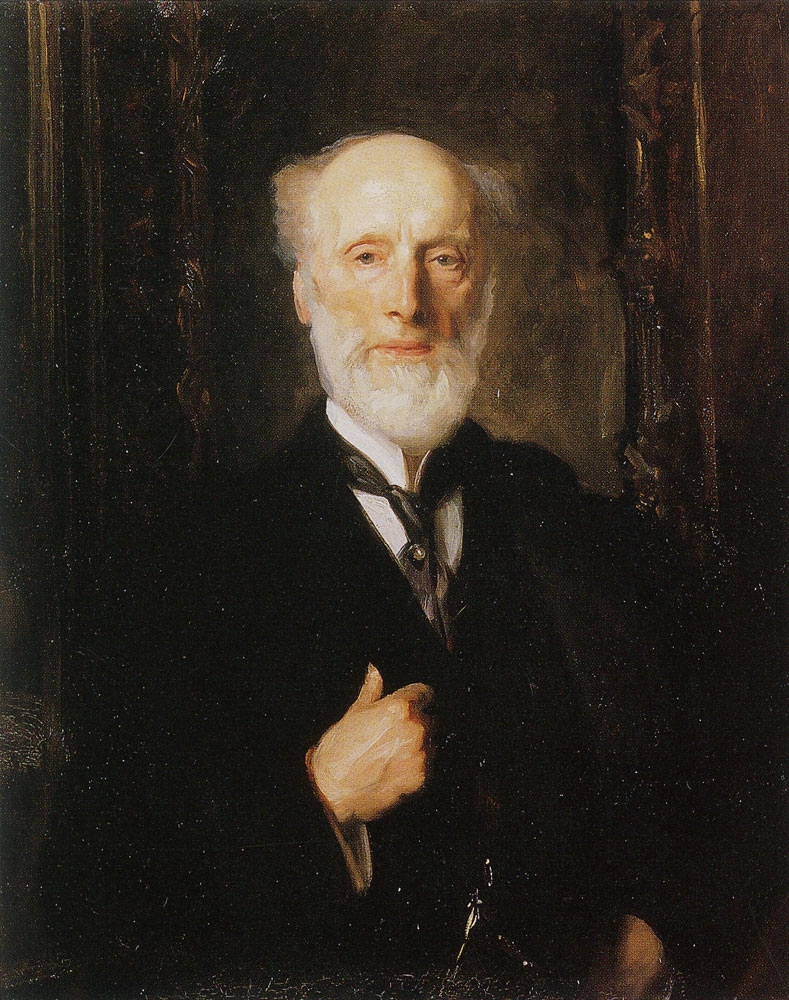
Portrait of Sir Charles Tennant by John Singer Sargent

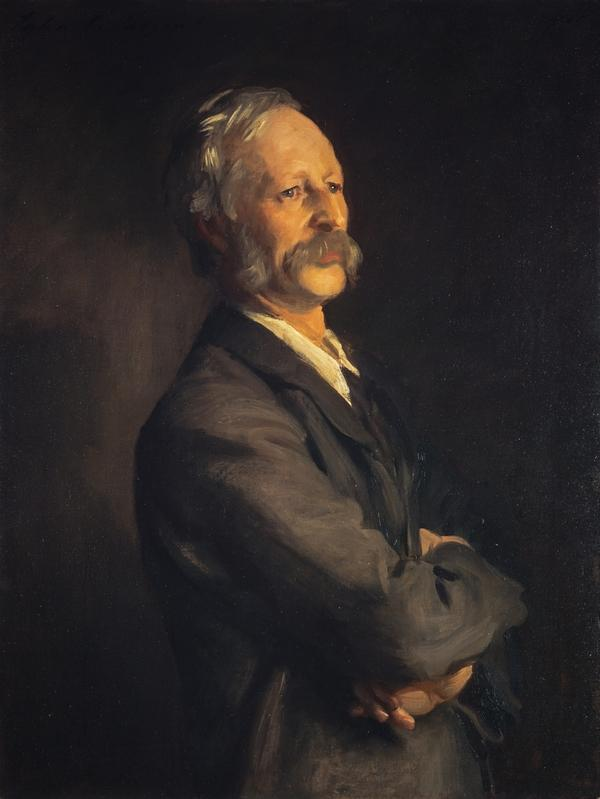
Portrait of Charles Loch by John Singer Sargent

== Bibliography ==
- Crankshaw, David J. & Gross, George W. C. (ed.) Reformation Reputations: The Power of the Individual in English Reformation History. Springer International Publishing, 2020.
- Lomax, James & Ormond, Richard. John Singer Sargent and the Edwardian Age. Leeds Art Galleries, 1979.
