= The Flower Girl (Shannon) =

Painting by James Jebusa Shannon

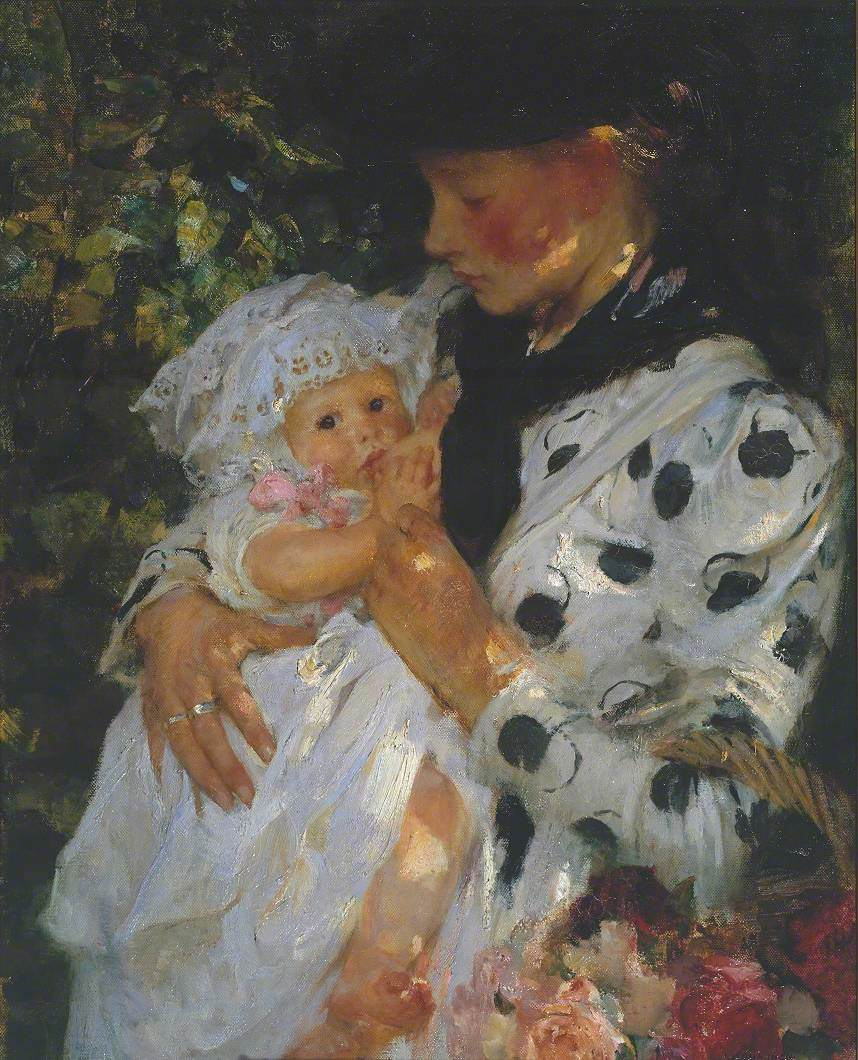
- Artist: James Jebusa Shannon
- Year: 1900
- Type: Oil on canvas, portrait painting
- Dimensions: 66 cm × 83.8 cm (26 in × 33.0 in)
- Location: Tate Britain, London

The Flower Girl is a 1900 oil painting by the American-British artist James Jebusa Shannon. It features a portrait of a flower seller breastfeeding her baby. It was produced while Shannon was holidaying with his family in Eastbourne. He regularly encountered the flower seller on the beach and she agreed to sit for him in her normal working clothes with her basket of flowers.

The painting was displayed at the Royal Academy Exhibition of 1901 held at Burlington House in London, where it was one of the most widely praised works. It was acquired as part of the Chantrey Bequest and is now part of the collection of the Tate Britain in Pimlico.

== Bibliography ==
- Burke, Doreen Bolger. American Paintings in the Metropolitan Museum of Art. Metropolitan Museum of Art, 1980.
- Huneault, Kristina. Difficult Subjects Working Women and Visual Culture, Britain 1880-1914. Ashgate, 2002.
- McConkey, Kenneth. Edwardian Portraits: Images of an Age of Opulence. Antique Collectors' Club, 1987.
