= A Mermaid =

1900 painting by John William Waterhouse

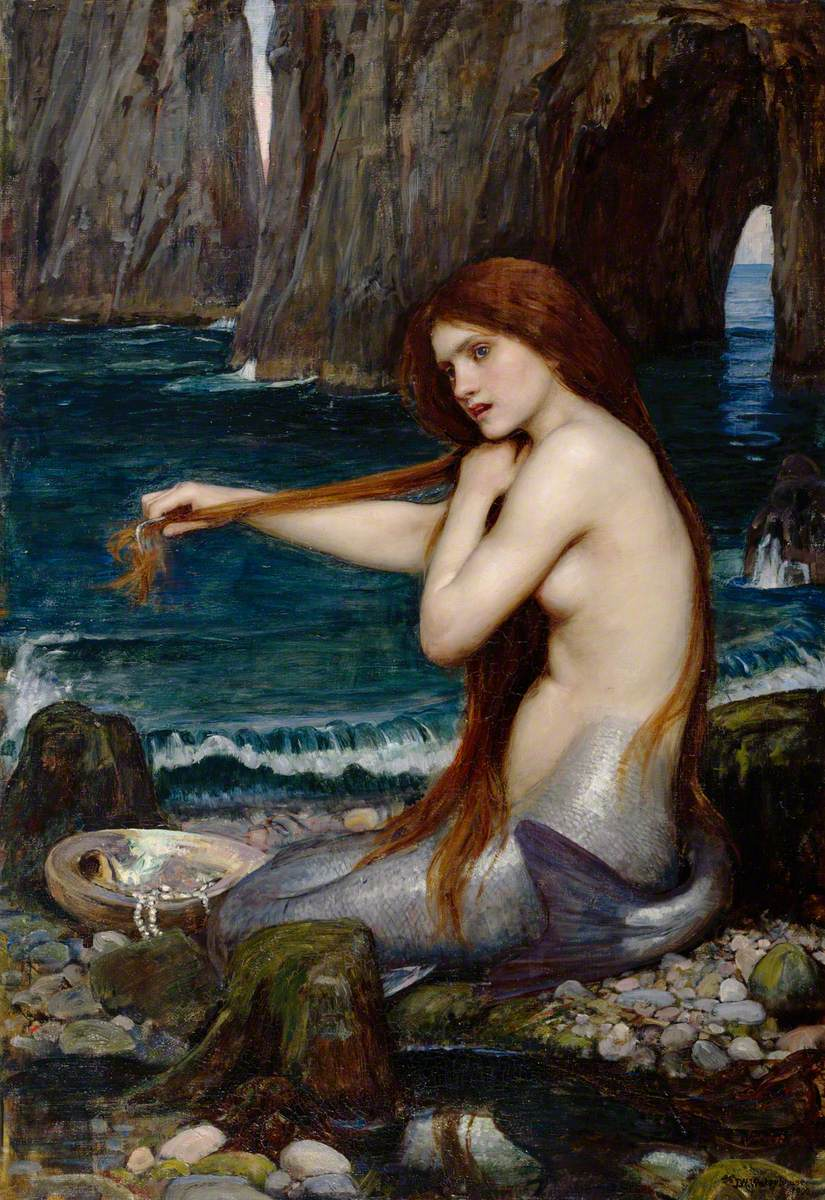
- Artist: John William Waterhouse
- Year: 1900
- Type: Oil on canvas, mythological painting
- Dimensions: 96.6 cm × 66.6 cm (38.0 in × 26.2 in)
- Location: Royal Academy, London

A Mermaid is a 1900 oil painting by the British artist John William Waterhouse. It was inspired by Alfred, Lord Tennyson's 1830 poem The Mermaid. He produced an oil sketch for the work in 1892. Waterhouse presented it to the Royal Academy of Arts at his diploma work, having been elected to full membership five years earlier. It was displayed at the Royal Academy Summer Exhibition of 1901 at Burlington House.

== See also ==
- List of paintings by John William Waterhouse

== Bibliography ==
- Cavallaro, Dani (2017). J.W. Waterhouse and the Magic of Color. McFarland.
- Prettejohn, Elizabeth (2008). J.W. Waterhouse: The Modern Pre-Raphaelite. Royal Academy of Arts.
