= The Cloud (Hacker) =

Painting by Arthur Hacker

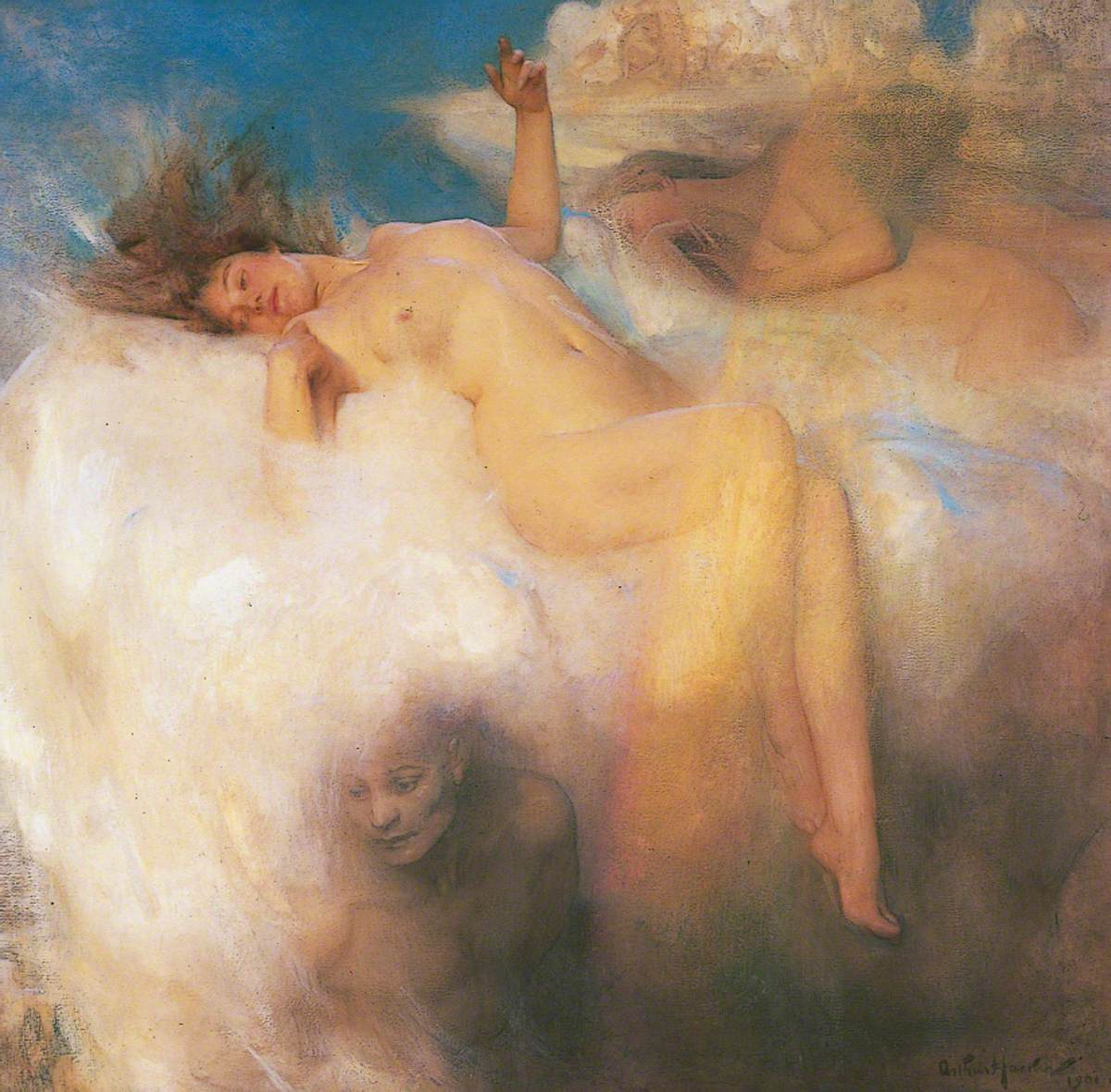
- Artist: Arthur Hacker
- Year: 1901
- Type: Oil on canvas, nude art
- Dimensions: 127.7 cm × 130 cm (50.3 in × 51 in)
- Location: Cartwright Hall, Bradford

The Cloud is a 1901 oil painting by the British artist Arthur Hacker. It depicts a young nude woman reclining amongst clouds, with the presence of less well prominent figures also shown less prominently. It is Symbolist in style. The picture was displayed at the Royal Academy Exhibition of 1901 held at Burlington House in London, where it was accompanied by lines from a poem by Percy Bysshe Shelley. Today it is in the collection of Cartwright Hall in Bradford, having been purchased in 1902.

== Bibliography ==
- Priestley, John Boynton The Edwardians. Spehre Books, 1970.
- O'Neill, Michael & Howe, Tony (ed.) The Oxford Handbook of Percy Bysshe Shelley. Oxford University Press, 2013.
- Smith, Elise Lawton. Evelyn Pickering De Morgan and the Allegorical Body. Fairleigh Dickinson University Press, 2002.
