= The Arrival of Marie de Medici at Marseille =

Painting by Peter Paul Rubens

The Disembarkation at Marseilles

The Arrival of Marie de Medici at Marseilles is a Baroque painting by Sir Peter Paul Rubens executed c. 1622–1625. It was commissioned by Marie de' Medici of France to commemorate the life of her and her husband Henry IV of France. This painting was one of the 24 paintings in the Marie de' Medici cycle by Rubens. The painting is in the Louvre in Paris.

== History ==
Marie de' Medici commissioned 24 paintings, pictures that depicted historical events in her life, with the intention to decorate the Palais du Luxembourg. She commissioned the paintings in an attempt to sway public opinion regarding her right to rule. Due to her foreign heritage, the French saw her as undeserving of her position as a ruler. After her arrival, she married Henry IV in 1600. He would die ten years later, well before the cycle was commissioned.

== Description ==
The Arrival of Marie de’ Medici at Marseilles shows the Queen of France arriving by ship in Marseille on November 3, 1600. She is greeted by unknown characters that represent France, as they are seen with the French royalty symbol, the Fleur-de-lis. At the bottom of the painting, Neptune and the daughters of Nereus, the Sea God, are seen saluting the Queen. At the top of the painting, the character Fame is flying overhead, trumpeting the Queen's arrival. Rubens uses these symbolic figures to transform a historical event into an allegory that reinforces Marie de' Medici's right to the throne. The various French symbols depicted greeting Marie upon her arrival are meant to establish good will and respect between her and the French people.
