= The First Commission =

Painting by Margaret Isabel Dicksee

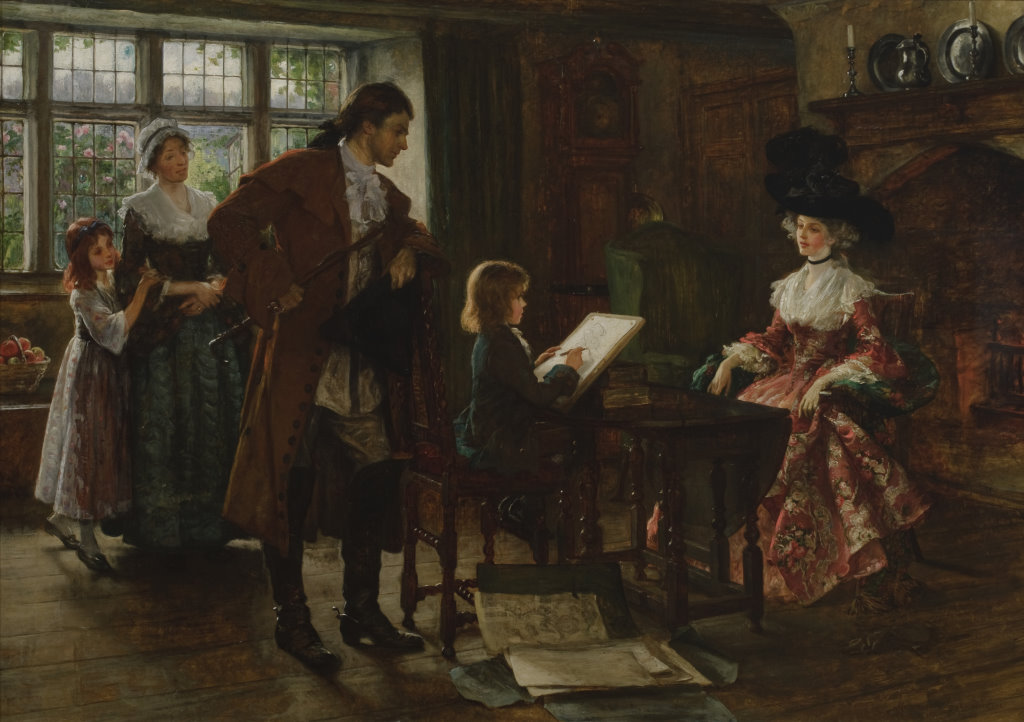
- Artist: Margaret Isabel Dicksee
- Year: 1901
- Type: Oil on canvas, history painting
- Dimensions: 91.4 cm × 129.5 cm (36.0 in × 51.0 in)
- Location: Auckland Art Gallery, Auckland

The First Commission is a 1901 history painting by the British artist Margaret Isabel Dicksee. It depicts a scene in the early 1770s featuring the English portrait painter Thomas Lawrence. Lawrence was the son of the landlord of the Bear Hotel in the Wiltshire market town of Devizes. A child prodigy he began producing portraits at a young age and was soon supporting his family with his art. He later went on to become the leading portraitist of the Regency era and was elected President of the Royal Academy. The painting is a romanticised depiction of the very first commission received from one of the patrons at his father's coaching inn. It reflects a popular late Victorian era theme of showing the childhood of famous figures.

The artist was the sister of Frank Dicksee. The painting was displayed at the Royal Academy Exhibition of 1901 held at Burlington House in London. Today it is part of the collection of the Auckland Art Gallery in New Zealand.

== Bibliography ==
- Shires, Linda M. Rewriting the Victorians: Theory, History, and the Politics of Gender. Routledge, 2012.
- Wright, Amina. Thomas Lawrence: Coming of Age. Bloomsbury Publishing, 2020.
- Yeldham, Charlotte. Women Artists in Nineteenth-century France and England. Garland Publishing, 1984.
