= Roland Ansieau =

French art deco graphic artist

Roland Ansieau (1901–1987) was an early 20th-century French art deco graphic artist, best known for his 1935 "Berger 45" wine advertisement, which is widely reproduced, as poster prints. Ansieau also created colorful illustrations for a 1931 seasonal guide to Deauville "the flowered beach". Little else is known of his life or work.

== Biography ==
Roland Georges Ansieau was born in Soissons on December 21, 1901. He studied sculpture from the age of 16 before being admitted to the Beaux-Arts. Between 1920 and 1930, he worked as a studio head for Léon Ullmann and then André Devambez, and in 1925 received an honorable mention at the Salon des artistes français.

Founding member of the Académie de l'affiche (1939), he designed numerous posters for Seita. Professor of advertising (1947-1952), from 1968 he worked on restoring paintings. He was also the illustrator of Charles Géniaux's La Bretagne vivantes. Roland Ansieau died in the 13th arrondissement of Paris on January 18, 1987.
