= Margaret Isabel Dicksee =

British painter

Margaret Dicksee
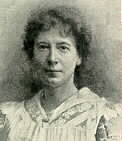
- Born: Margaret Isabel Dicksee; 22 January 1858; London, England, United Kingdom
- Died: 6 June 1903 (aged 45)
- Known for: Painting

Margaret Dicksee or Margaret Isabel Dicksee (22 January 1858 – 6 June 1903) was a British painter.

Dicksee was born in London as the daughter of the painter Thomas Francis Dicksee. Her brother Frank Dicksee also became a painter. Dicksee showed her works at the Royal Academy from 1883.

Her paintings In Memoriam and The Child Handel were included in the 1905 book Women Painters of the World.

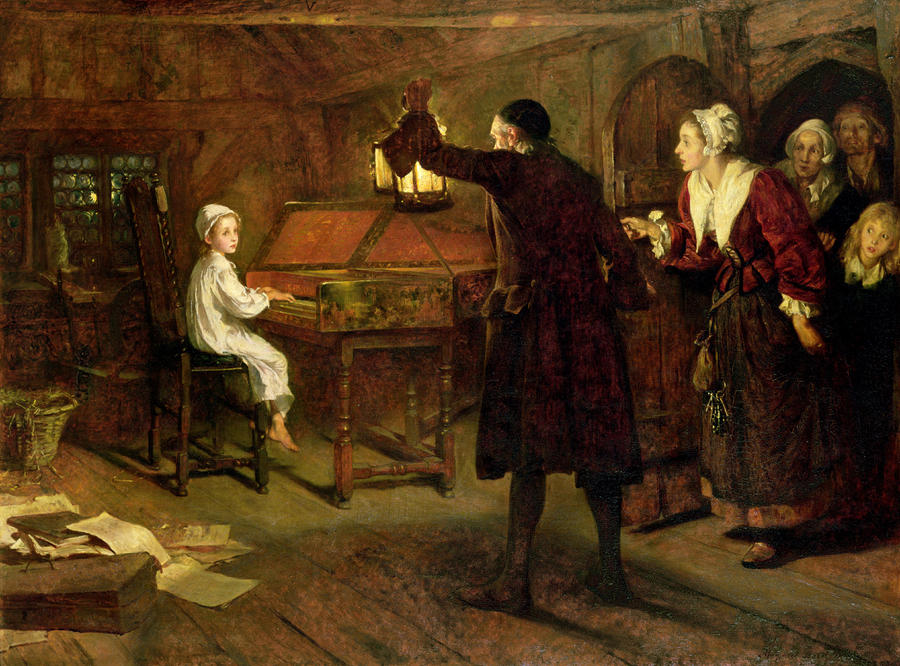
The Child Handel, 1893

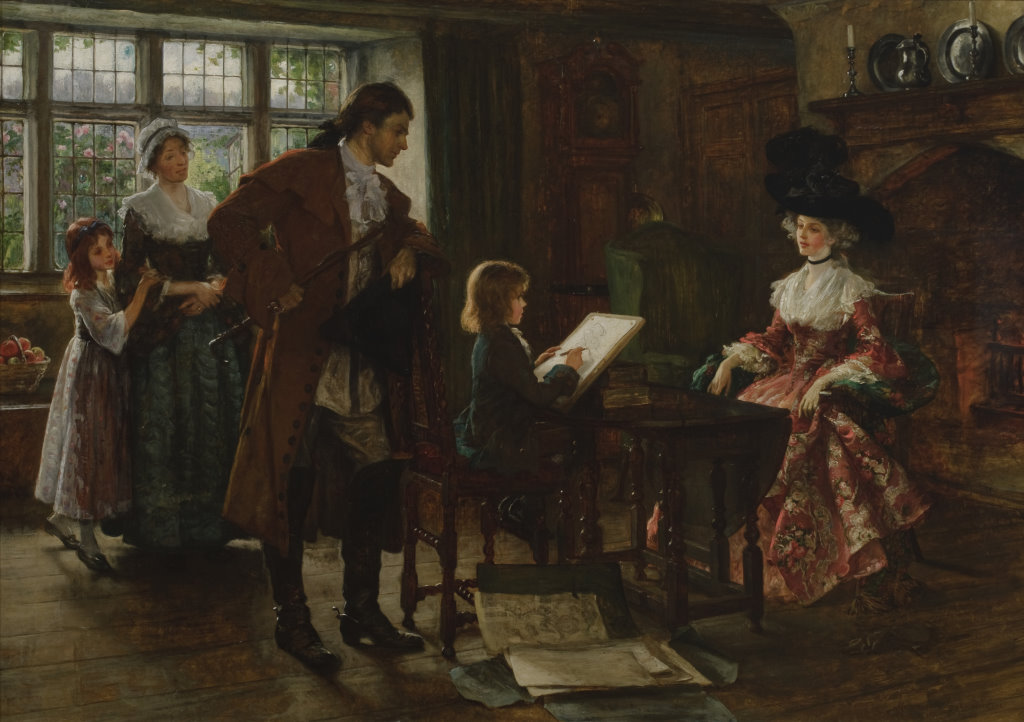
The First Commission, 1901

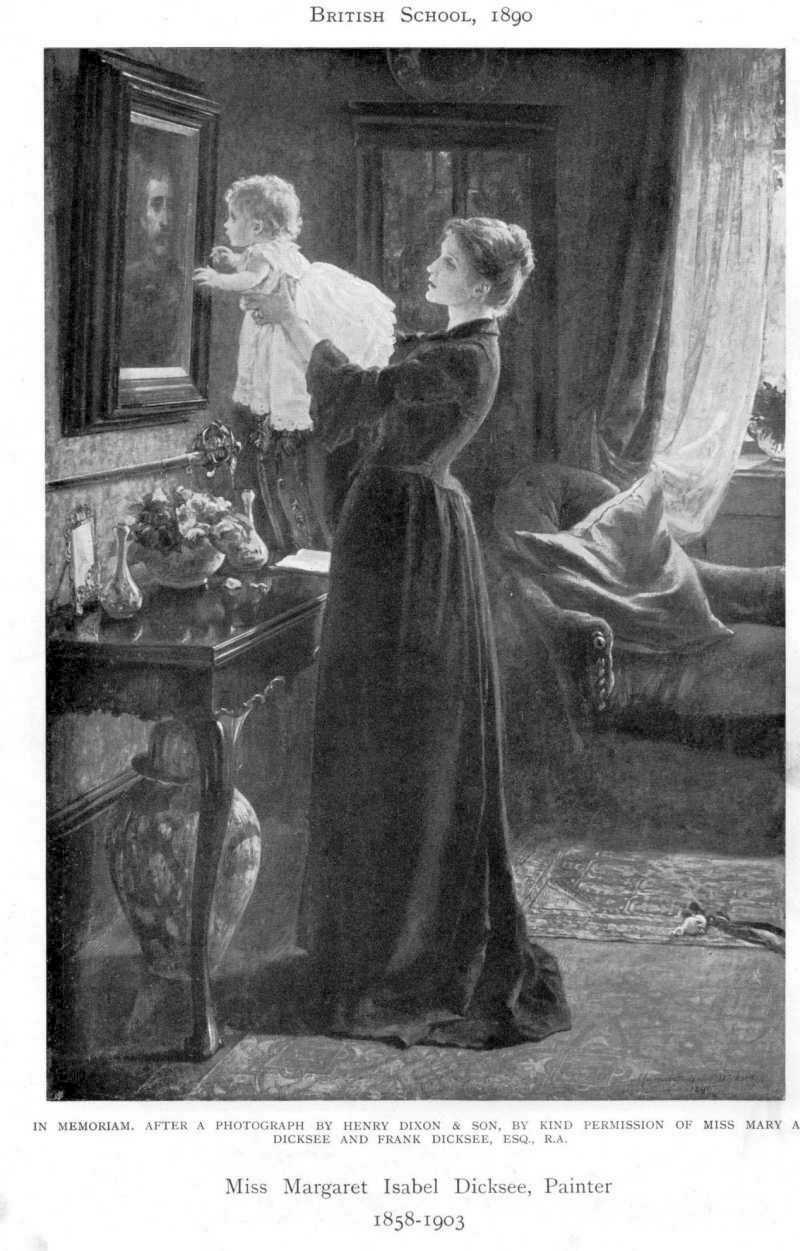
In Memoriam
