= The Smart Set =

American literary magazine

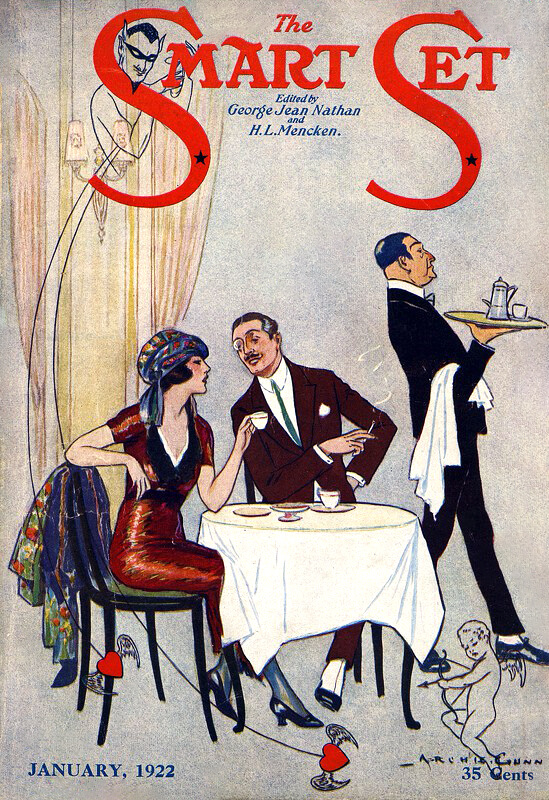
- Cover of January 1922 issue by illustrator Archie Gunn
- Categories: Literary magazine
- Circulation: 250,000 (in 1925)
- Publisher: William d'Alton Mann (1900–1911); John Adams Thayer (1911–1914); Eugene Crowe and Eltinge F. Warner (1914–1930)
- First issue: March 1900
- Final issue: July 1930
- Country: United States
- Based in: New York City
- Language: English

The Smart Set was an American monthly literary magazine, founded by Colonel William d'Alton Mann and published from March 1900 to June 1930. Its headquarters was in New York City. During its Jazz Age heyday under the editorship of H. L. Mencken and George Jean Nathan, The Smart Set offered many up-and-coming authors their start and gave them access to a relatively large audience.

Following a dispute with owner Eltinge Warner over an unprinted article mocking the national grief over President Warren G. Harding's death, Mencken and Nathan departed the publication to create The American Mercury in 1924. After their departure, Warner sold the publication to press mogul William Randolph Hearst. Although circulation increased under Hearst's ownership and he merged it with what had been McClure's, the magazine's content declined in quality. Following the Wall Street Crash of 1929, the magazine failed to survive the economic slump and ceased publication in June 1930.

Half a decade after its dissolution, critic Louis Kronenberger hailed The Smart Set in The New York Times Book Review as one of the greatest literary publications due to its influence over American culture during its brief existence. "You were very conscious that it was making literary history," Kronenberger wrote, "it was teaching a literary America that went about on all fours how to walk."

== Early years ==
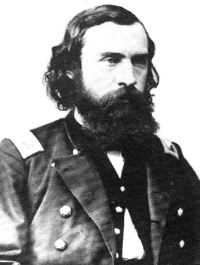
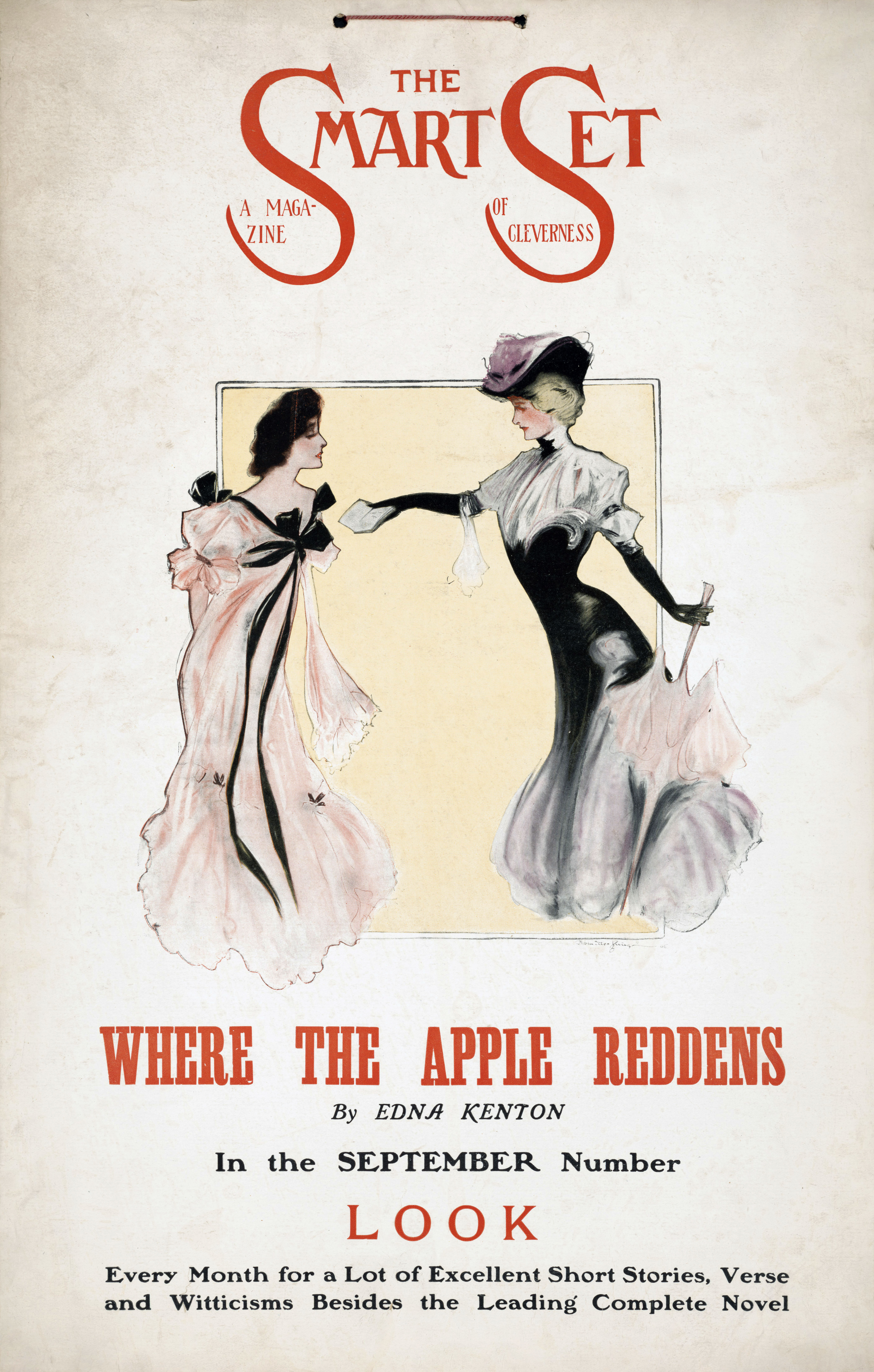
Union Army Colonel William d'Alton Mann (first) and one of the earlier covers of his magazine (second).

In 1900, American Civil War veteran and financier Colonel William d'Alton Mann sought to offer a cultural counterpart to his gossip magazine Town Topics, an infamous publication which he used for political and social gain among New York City's elite. Mann used his Town Topics investigators to gather embarrassing information about wealthy individuals in New York Society and would allow these individuals to suppress the articles in exchange for monetary remuneration. This practice led many historians to suggest the latter magazine functioned more or less as a means for Mann to collect blackmail:

"No one was named, but veiled suggestions were provided and later it would become generally known that most of the revenue which Mann derived from this magazine came from his policy of offering to suppress forthcoming columns for a price."

When conceiving his new publication entitled The Smart Set, Mann wished to include works "by, for and about 'The Four Hundred'," referring to Ward McAllister's claim that there were only 400 fashionable people in New York's upper society. As a so-called "pasha of the Gilded Age," Mann sought to provide sophisticated content that would reinforce the social values of New York's social elite. He sought out writers supposedly "from the ranks of the best society of Europe and America", and he gave his new publication the subtitle "The Magazine of Cleverness."

Mann published the first issue of The Smart Set on March 10, 1900, under the editorship of young poet Arthur Grissom, who had also worked on Town Topics. As editor, Grissom created the formula of the magazine that would remain intact throughout the greater part of its existence: 160 pages containing a novelette, a short play, several poems, and witticisms to fill blank spaces. Its first cover, by Kay Womrath, "depicted a dancing couple in evening dress controlled by strings held by a grinning Pan; the slashing S's of the title were in vermilion. The price was twenty-five cents." Its earliest contributors included poets Ella Wheeler Wilcox, Bliss Carman and Clinton Scollard.

Grissom was the first editor to publish works by O. Henry in The Smart Set, and O. Henry's short story, The Lotos and the Bottle, was published by Grissom "at the bargain rate of fifty dollars" in cash. After a brief tenure as editor, however, Grissom died of typhoid fever in December 1901. Novelist Marvin Dana took over as editor, in the first of a series of managerial turnovers that would define the evolution of magazine until its termination. Dana formed an editorial triumvirate consisting of himself and two associate editors, Charles Hanson Towne and newspaper correspondent Henry Collins Walsh.

Dana remained as editor until 1904, when he left The Smart Set to work in newspapers. Dana's chosen successor was Towne, previously an editor at Cosmopolitan Magazine. Towne was the magazine's first editor to actively push to publish new literary talents such as James Branch Cabell. He also oversaw a stable of famous contributors such as Jack London, Ambrose Bierce and Theodore Dreiser. Under Towne's editorship, the Smart Set honed its tone and content:

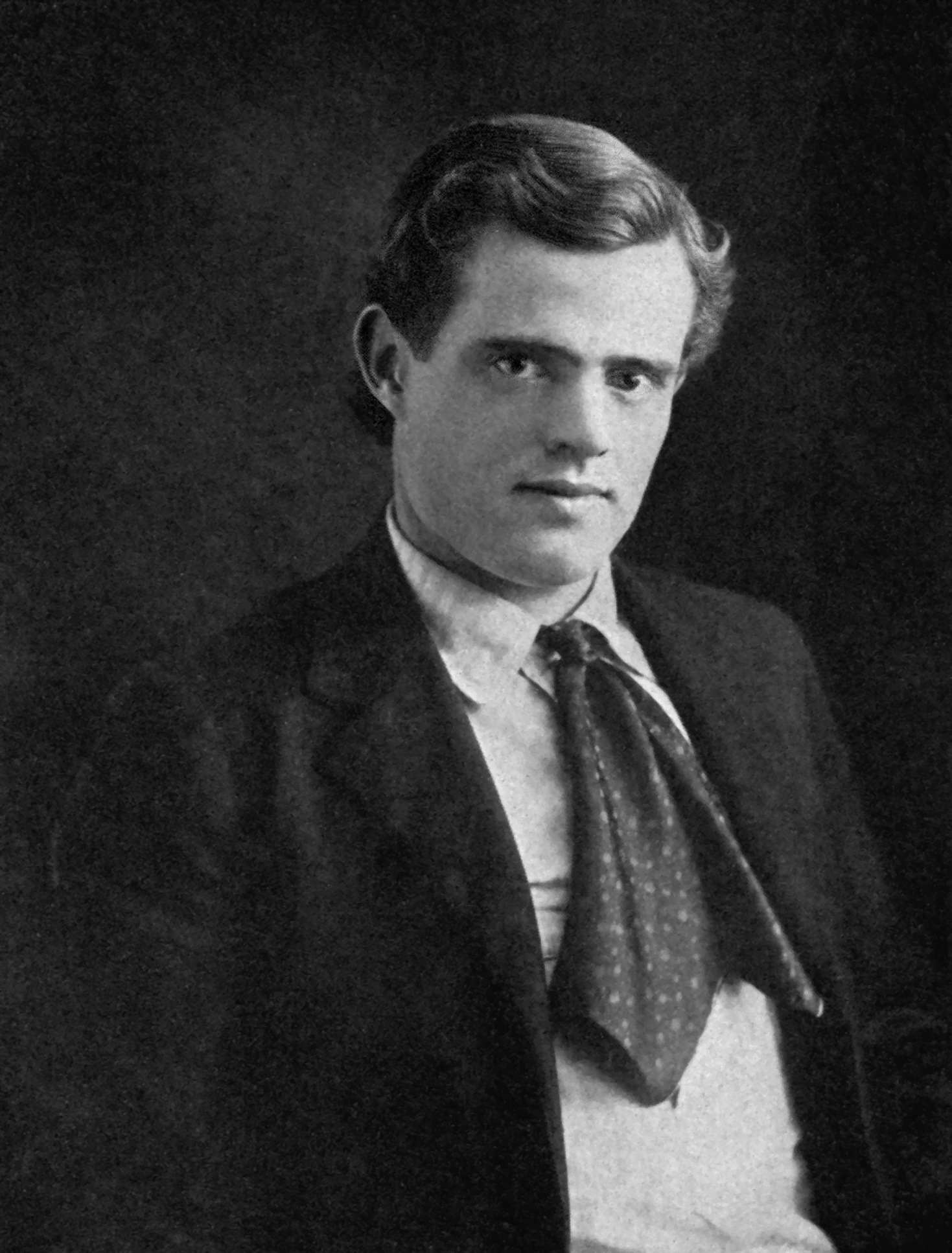
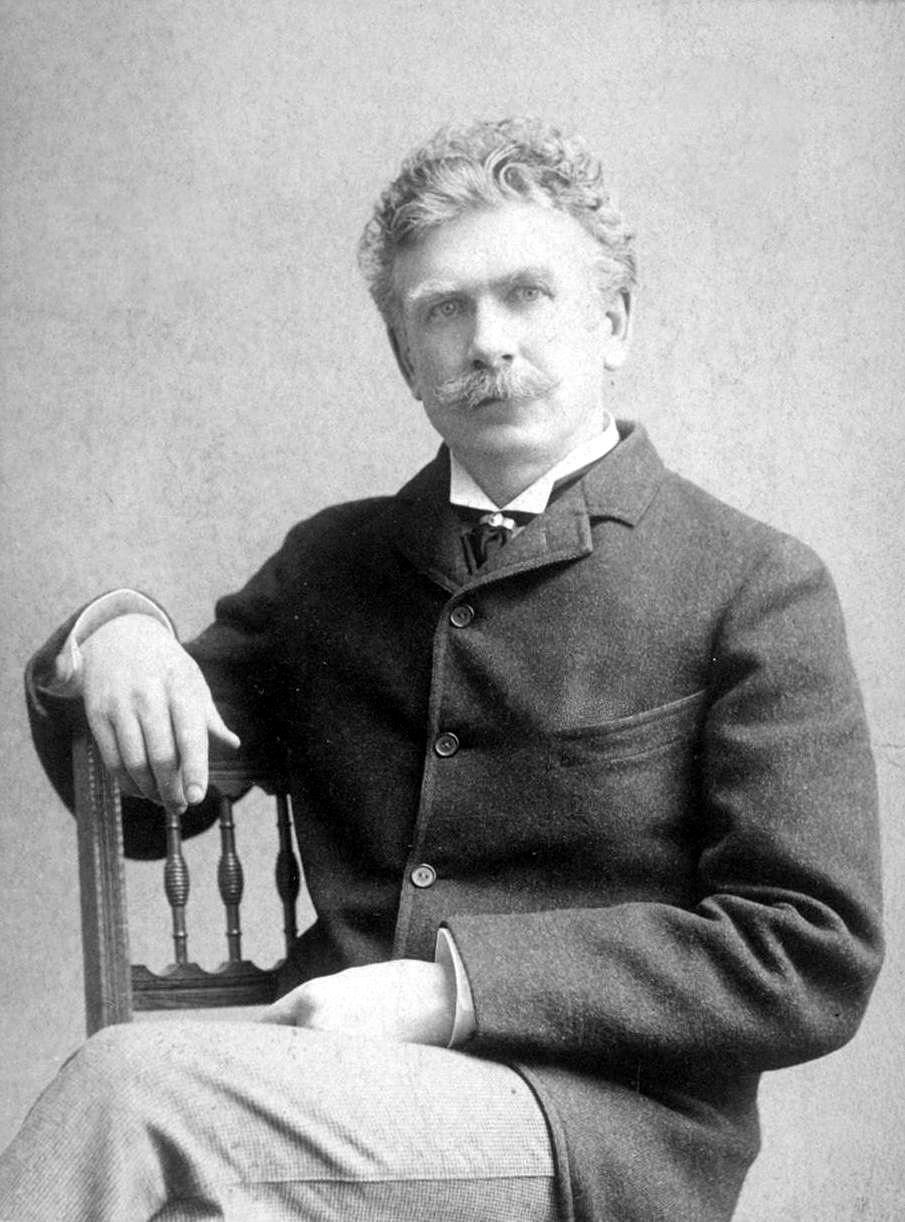
Jack London and Ambrose Bierce were among the regular contributors during the Mann era.

"It sometimes relaxed its accent on high society for variety's sake; but the bon ton, the light satirical touch, social intrigue, love without benefit of clergy, and irony at the expense of conventions were of the essence of the magazine. Each number began with a novelette; continued with ten or a dozen stories, one of them in French; found a place two-thirds of the way through for an essay on literature, the stage, travel, or society; filled in odd pages or half pages with verse; and tucked in epigrams and jokes and little satires in chinks here and there."

By 1905, the magazine reached its peak circulation of 165,000. However, due to allegations of blackmail associated with Mann's Town Topics in 1906, The Smart Set's popularity declined precipitously, immediately losing around 25,000 readers. Dissatisfied with the magazine's direction, Towne resigned his position as editor in 1908 to work with Theodore Dreiser on The Delineator, an American women's magazine.

After Towne's departure, Mann stepped up as editor alongside Fred Splint, and the two men set out to revitalize the magazine and to rebuild its readership. As part of this revitalization, Mann started a monthly book review column and, in 1908, Splint hired the Baltimore newspaperman Henry Louis Mencken to fill the book reviewer position at the suggestion of editorial assistant Norman Boyer. The twenty-eight-year-old Mencken became quite popular with readers as his "oracular, pungent, and racy" book reviews garnered much attention. Using his position as book reviewer for The Smart Set, Mencken would become "America's most important literary and social critic."

Soon after, in 1909, George Jean Nathan became the magazine's drama columnist. During his tenure as the Smart Set's resident theater critic, Jean "would become an extremely influential figure in the New York drama scene." Nathan "matched Mencken in his defiance of conventional mores, his saucy style, [and] his magisterial attitude." Together, the combined criticisms of Mencken and Nathan elevated the substantive content of Mann's magazine to appeal to intellectuals and ensured the magazine's place in literary history.

== Thayer years ==
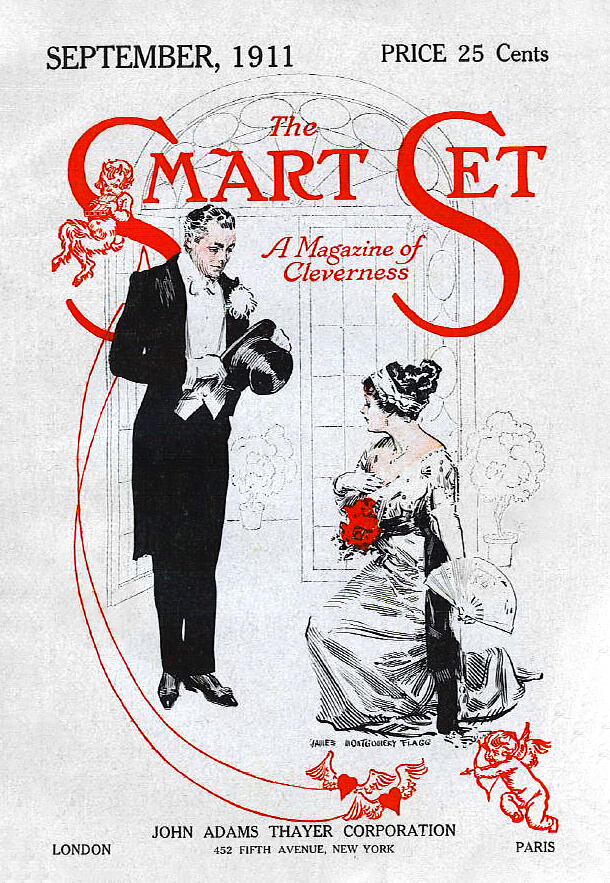
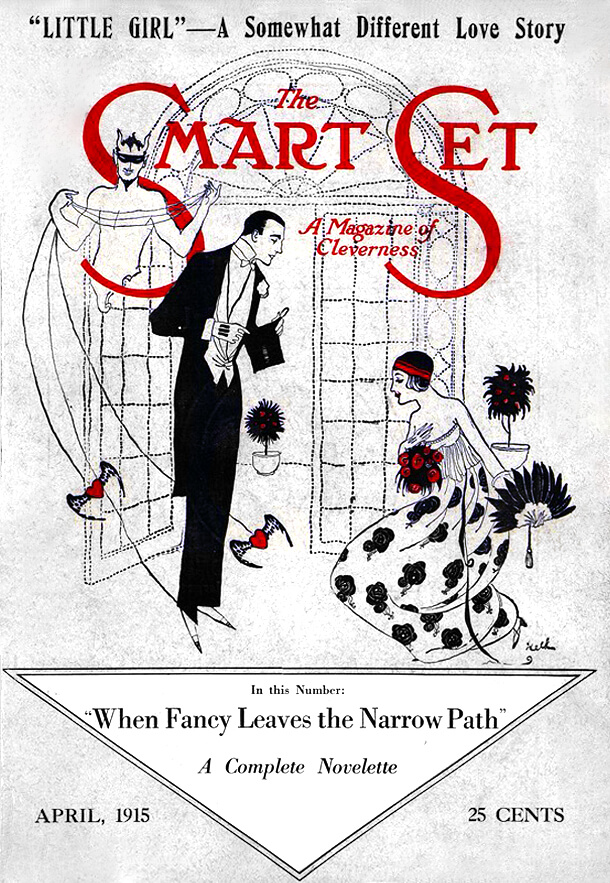
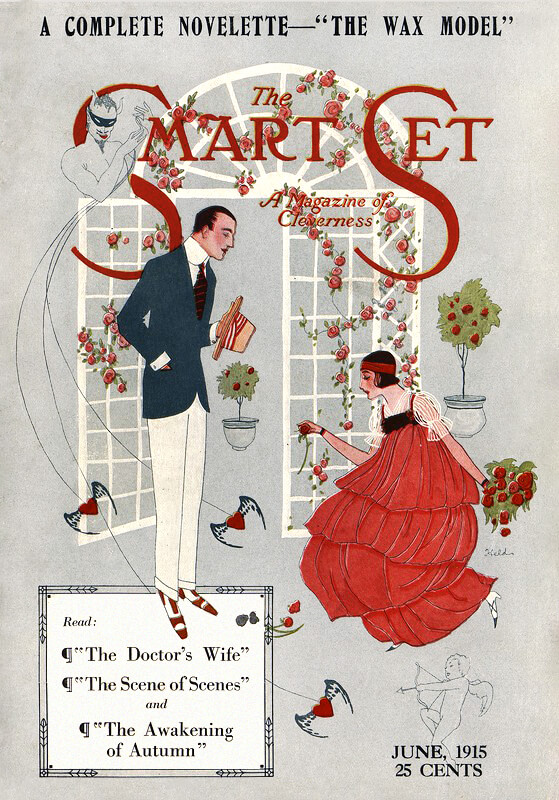
Covers of the September 1911 issue (left), the April 1915 issue (middle), and the June 1915 issue (right) which show the evolution of both the magazine and American fashion.

With The Smart Set in perpetual decline, Mann sold the magazine in Spring 1911 to John Adams Thayer for $100,000. Thayer was a self-made millionaire who had "made a personal fortune as a successful advertising manager at the Ladies' Home Journal."

Thayer, who previously pulled the muckraking Everybody's Magazine out of a slump and earned himself a significant fortune from its sale, hoped ownership of The Smart Set would allow him entrance into the social ranks of New York's high society. However, the magazine's ruined reputation made this difficult and his purchase left him in charge of a sinking ship.

After Mencken and Nathan both declined the offer of editorship, Thayer assumed the position of editor-in-chief and appointed the magazine's associate editor, Norman Boyer, as managing editor. An expert in advertising, Thayer added a slogan to the magazine's subtitle, stating that "Its Prime Purpose is to Provide Lively Entertainment for Minds That Are Not Primitive." The new slogan was unsuccessful in restoring the magazine's reputation and popularity, but in 1912 a younger, more rebellious audience began reading The Smart Set for that very reason. To accommodate this new demographic, Thayer, at the recommendation of Mencken, handed over the editorship to Willard Huntington Wright in 1913. Wright was a Harvard graduate and had served as the literary editor of The Los Angeles Times. Wright outlined the magazine's new editorial direction in the next month's issue:

"We want to make of The Smart Set not only the best magazine in America, but something entirely new—the sort of magazine that Europe has been able to support, but which so far has not yet been attempted in America."

Wright hired critic Ezra Pound as an overseas talent scout for The Smart Set.

Although only lasting a year, Wright's tenure marked a period of artistic prosperity for The Smart Set. Thayer appointed Wright as editor with complete control of the magazine's content and direction. Wright, immediately taking advantage of this position, began collecting manuscripts from new artists and hired Ezra Pound as an overseas talent scout. With an appreciation for new and unconventional literary styles, Wright steered the magazine into publishing more experimental and avant-garde literary works by authors such as D.H. Lawrence, Joseph Conrad, William Butler Yeats, and Ford Madox Ford.

Wright's editorial decision caused a drastic reduction in readership and angered the magazine's advertisers, who began withdrawing financial backing. Additionally, Wright was using The Smart Set's checkbook to overpay authors for their work and was attempting to secretly fund a prototype of a more radical publication with Mencken. As a result, Thayer fired Wright in 1914 and announced an end to the magazine's avant-garde content and a return to more traditional material. By the end of Wright's editorship, however, the magazine was in economic disrepair, and Thayer handed over ownership to Colonel Eugene Crowe in return for forgiveness of debts.

Due to the fired Wright's editorial decisions, the magazine had acquired a new intellectual audience. Its readership included such notable writers as Sinclair Lewis, Theodore Dreiser, Hugh Walpole, F. Scott Fitzgerald, and Ernest Hemingway, as well as college professors such as Stewart Sherman and Percy Boynton. The magazine also had garnered the attention of a number of critics and journalists, including Burton Rascoe, Edmund Wilson, Alfred Kazin, Franklin Pierce Adams and Harold Ross, the co-founder of The New Yorker magazine who was inspired to create the latter publication upon the demise of The Smart Set.

== Mencken and Nathan years ==
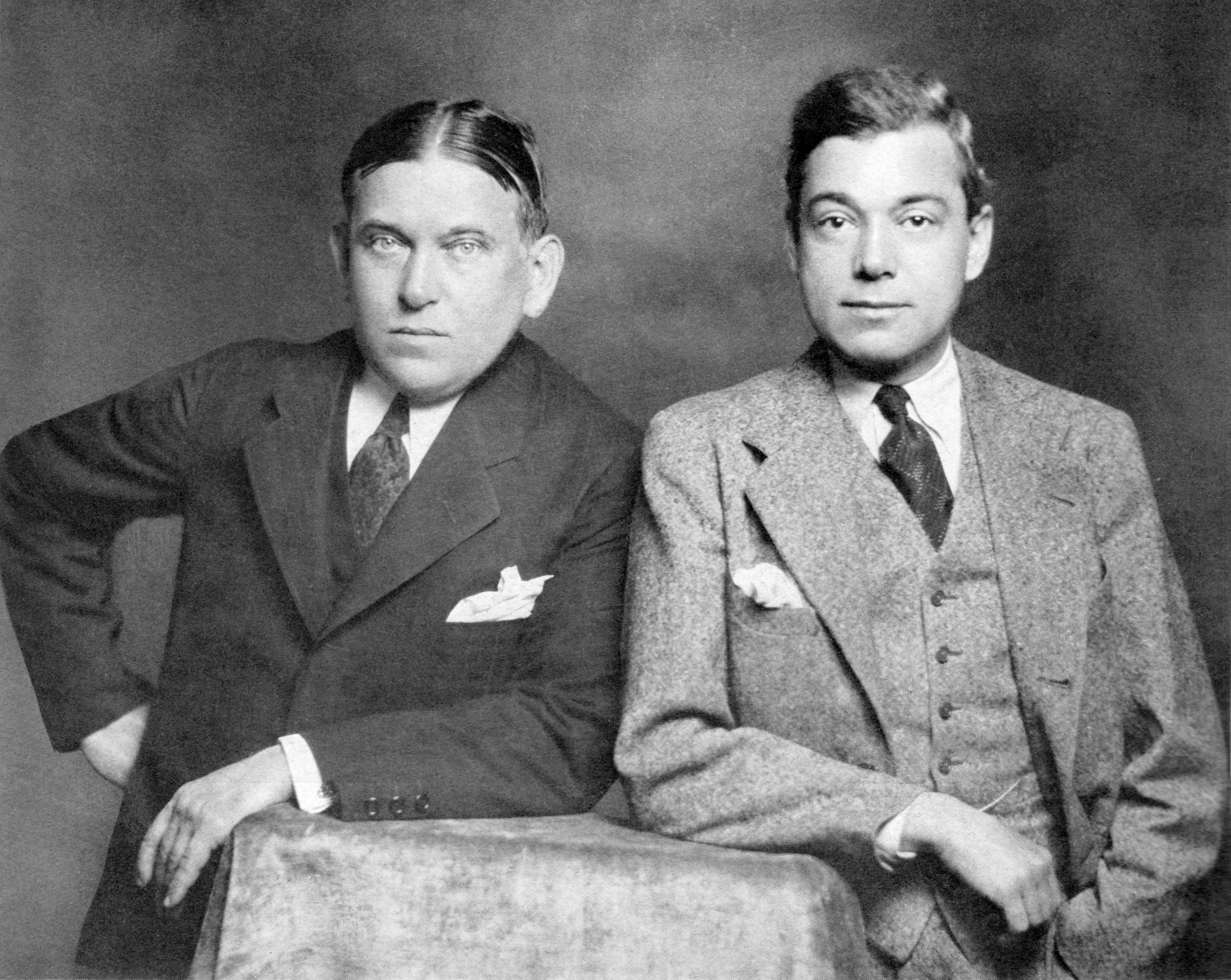
Co-editors H.L. Mencken and George Jean Nathan

Having little interest in running a magazine, Crowe gave control of The Smart Set to Eltinge Warner, who then appointed Mencken and Nathan as co-editors with total artistic control. Warner remained in control of the magazine's accounts—circulation, advertising, and bookkeeping—while Mencken and Nathan focused on literary content.

In a series of measures to economize, Mencken and Nathan relocated the magazine's office to a smaller location and reduced the staff, retaining only themselves and a secretary, Sara Golde. Warner reprinted previous issues of The Smart Set under the title Clever Stories. In their most successful effort to boost revenue, Mencken and Nathan began the pulp magazine The Parisienne in 1915 as a place to publish a surplus of manuscripts they deemed inferior for The Smart Set. The Parisienne "capitalized on the then current war interest in France" generated significant profits, which they used to offset the production costs of The Smart Set. The co-editors sold The Parisienne to Warner and Crowe in 1916 and repeated the process with Saucy Stories and, in 1920, Black Mask.

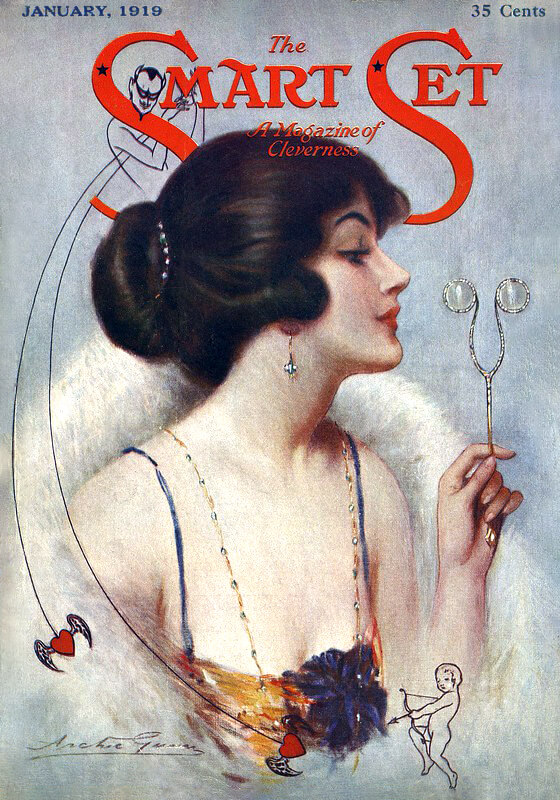
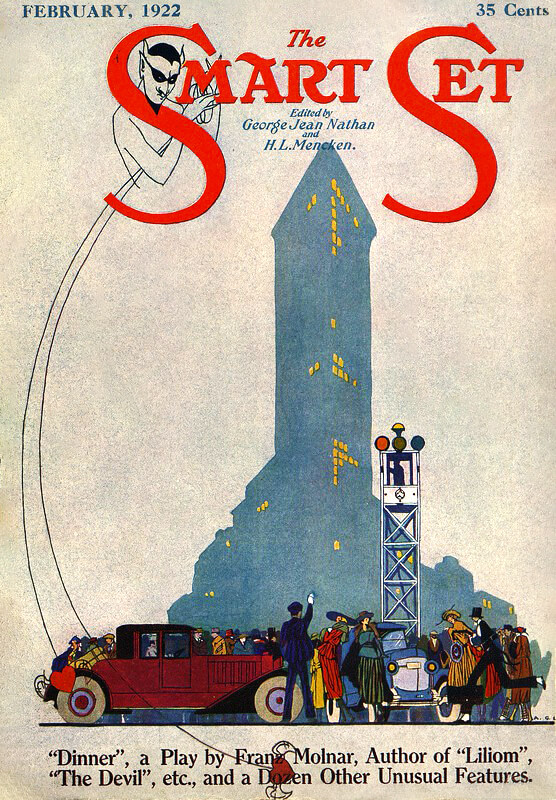
The January 1919 (left) and February 1922 (right) issues during the Mencken and Nathan years.

Mencken and Nathan's co-editorship helped to bring about a golden era for new literature and The Smart Set. Together, they "created a uniquely liberated mass-market venue for American fiction; this fact alone suggests the importance of this magazine in relation to American literary developments in the teens and early twenties." Circulation during their co-editorship was between 40,000 and 50,000, making it one of the most widely read literary publications.

During this time the magazine featured works by Edna St. Vincent Millay, Theodore Dreiser, Aldous Huxley, Sinclair Lewis, Benjamin De Casseres, Eugene O'Neill and Dashiell Hammett, among others. Millay's short story "Barbara on the Beach" appeared in November 1914. In May 1915 The Smart Set published two stories from James Joyce's Dubliners, the first time Joyce's work appeared in an American publication. The magazine introduced F. Scott Fitzgerald in September 1919, when it published his short story Babes in the Woods. In addition to introducing new literary talent, the two editors were renowned social critics, who lampooned virtually every facet of American culture. Although they were known for their satire, their controversial material became the reason for their departure from The Smart Set and would set in motion the end of the magazine itself.

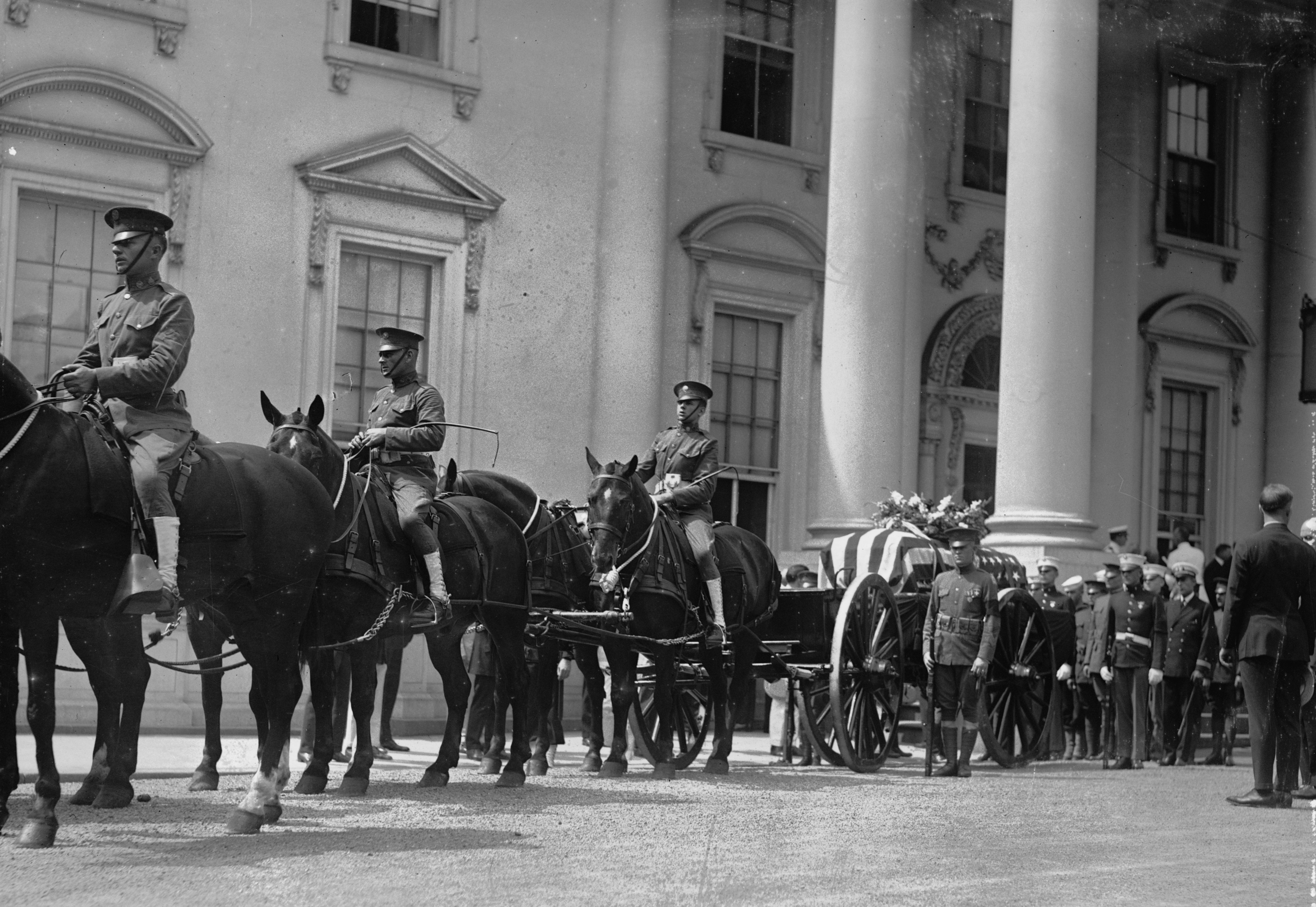
An unprinted article by Mencken and Nathan ridiculing the national grief over Warren G. Harding's death angered the magazine's owner Eltinge Warner. He sold the publication to William Randolph Hearst.

Mencken and Nathan cultivated a youthful readership who had grown increasingly restive and disillusioned with America in the aftermath of The Great War. During these years, "Mencken constantly exhorted his fellow critics and literary historians to provide realistic appraisals and re-evaluations of our [American] cultural past, which would then, he felt, influence the present."

Mencken and Nathan's editorship at The Smart Set came to an end after they planned to run a satirical piece on President Warren G. Harding following his death. Harding died in August 1923. His funeral procession involved transporting the body across the country from San Francisco to Ohio. The mainstream media began to sentimentalize the procession, to the dismay of Mencken and Nathan, who noticed a hypocritical change in the press's attitude. They planned to run a satirical piece on the president's funeral, treating the president in death as they did in life.

However, the magazine's printers noticed the piece and reported its contents to owner Eltinge Warner. Considering the piece to be a form of treason, Warner demanded that the editors remove it. "I don't give a damn what you thought of him," Warner stormed at Mencken and Nathan, "Harding was our President, after all." In a rage, Warner announced that he would sell the magazine within a year. Warner's removal of the satirical piece marked the end of the editors' carte blanche over the magazine's content, and they sought the freedom and control of their own publication. Upon leaving, Mencken and Nathan began a collaboration with the publishing magnate Alfred A. Knopf and started The American Mercury.

== Decline and final years ==
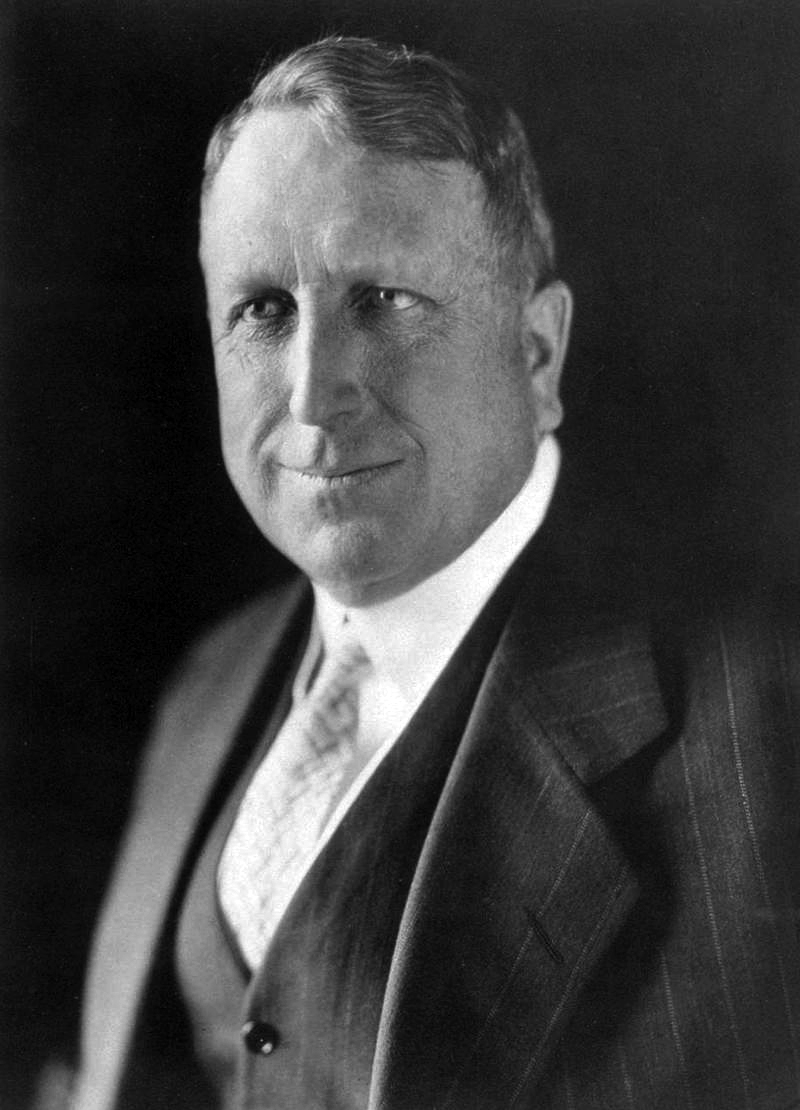
Press baron William Randolph Hearst's purchase of The Smart Set signaled the beginning of its demise.

Before leaving The Smart Set, Mencken and Nathan recommended Morris Gilbert to replace them as editor. Reportedly, Gilbert had no idea that Warner was planning to sell the magazine upon accepting his position as editor. Under the editorship of Gilbert, the magazine's attitude and content reverted to the days before Mencken and Nathan's—or even Wright's—time as editors. However, Gilbert's position as editor was short-lived. In 1924, Warner sold the magazine to the publishing tycoon William Randolph Hearst, who immediately gave editorial control to George D'Utassey. Unable to cope with the new management, Gilbert resigned soon after.

Hearst's ownership ushered in an editorial focus on commercialism and superficial moral themes. As the magazine's new editor, D'Utassey reversed the artistic headway that Mencken and Nathan had established for the magazine and changed the subtitle to "True Stories from Real Life." Under D'Utassey the magazine veered away from unconventional literature and satire. Although the content changed, Hearst's promotion of the magazine in other publications caused circulation to increase to 250,000 in 1925.

In 1929, the magazine merged with Hearst's newly acquired McClure's to form The New Smart Set, under the editorship of Margaret Sangster. Under Sangster, the magazine became a publication targeted towards young women and was given a new subtitle, "The Young Woman's Magazine." However, following the Wall Street Crash of 1929, the magazine was unable to survive the economic slump. It ceased publication in June 1930.

== Legacy and influence ==
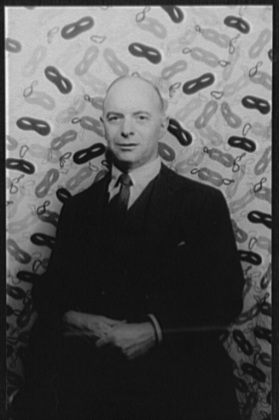
Louis Kronenberger hailed The Smart Set as one of the greatest magazines in history.

In 1934, nearly half a decade after the publication's dissolution, some of the best pieces from the magazine's heyday were collected in The Smart Set Anthology, published by Reynal & Hitchcock. That same year, critic Louis Kronenberger hailed the magazine in The New York Times Book Review as one of the greatest literary publications due to its influence over American culture during its brief existence:

"The Smart Set has become something of a legend. It was becoming something of one even while it still existed. You had the feeling, then, that some day you would sentimentalize over the years when The Smart Set was in its prime. You were very conscious that it was making literary history; you knew that it was teaching a literary America that went about on all fours how to walk."

In 1944, Grayson Publishing published a 840-page hardcover anthology of magazine's articles, titled The Bachelor's Companion: A Smart Set Collection, edited by Burton Rascoe and Groff Conklin. On the inside copyright page of this 1944 book is printed that the book was originally published and copyrighted by Reynal & Hitchcock in 1934.

In 2007, Drexel University launched an online cultural journal titled The Smart Set. Drexel's journal shares some ideals with the original Smart Set and lists Owen Hatteras, a pen name used by H. L. Mencken and George Jean Nathan of the original journal, on its masthead, but its connection to Mencken and Nathan's magazine is unofficial.

== Editorial tenures ==
William Mann era
- Arthur Grissom (1900–1901)
- Marvin Dana (1902–1904)
- Charles Hanson Towne (1904–1907)
- Fred C. Splint (1907–1908)
- Norman Boyer (1909–1911)
- Mark Lee Luther (1911–1912)

John Thayer era

- John Adams Thayer (1911–1913)
- Willard Huntington Wright (1913–1914)

Eltinge Warner era

- H.L. Mencken and George Nathan (1914–1924)
- Morris Gilbert (1924)

William Randolph Hearst era

- F. Orlin Tremaine (1924–1925)
- William Charles Lengel (1925–1928)
- T. Howard Kelly (1928–1929)
- Margeret Sangster (1929–1930)

== List of contributing authors ==
- Maxwell Anderson
- Sherwood Anderson
- Djuna Barnes
- Ambrose Bierce
- Bliss Carman
- Willa Cather
- Theodore Dreiser
- Lord Dunsany
- F. Scott Fitzgerald
- Ford Maddox Ford
- Zona Gale
- Richard Le Gallienne
- Dashiell Hammett
- Ben Hecht
- O. Henry
- Aldous Huxley
- William F. Jenkins
- Robinson Jeffers
- James Joyce
- Harry Kemp
- D.H. Lawrence
- Sinclair Lewis
- Anita Loos
- Jack London
- Edna St. Vincent Millay
- Eugene O'Neill
- Dorothy Parker
- Ezra Pound
- John Reed
- Bertram Fletcher Robinson
- Clinton Scollard
- Carl Van Vechten
- S.S. Van Dine
- Ella Wheeler Wilcox
- Isabel Briggs Myers

== Cover gallery ==
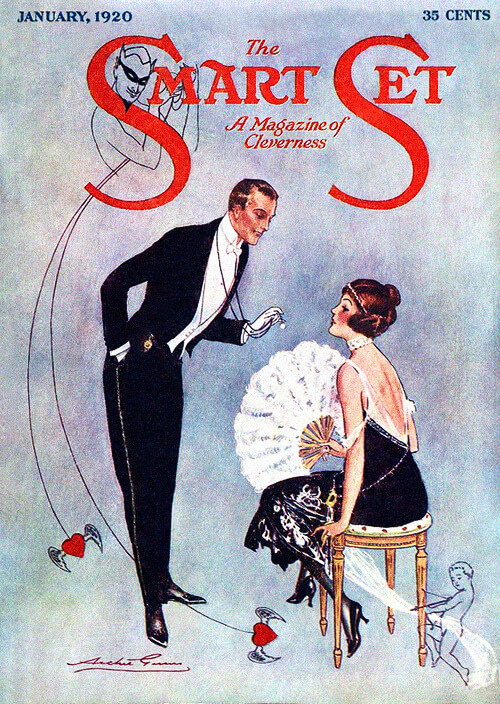
Cover of the January 1920 issue by Archie Gunn

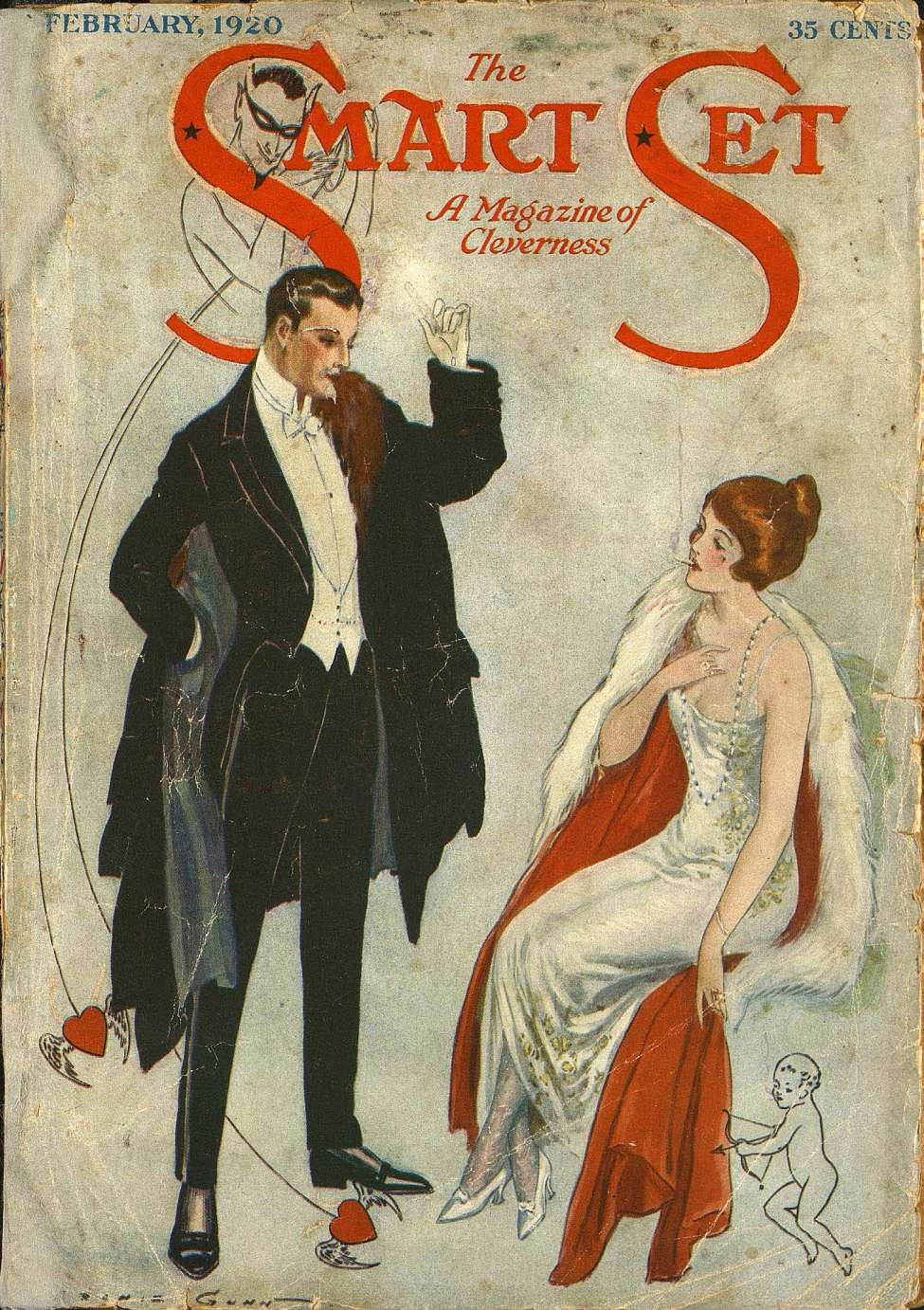
Cover of the February 1920 issue by Archie Gunn

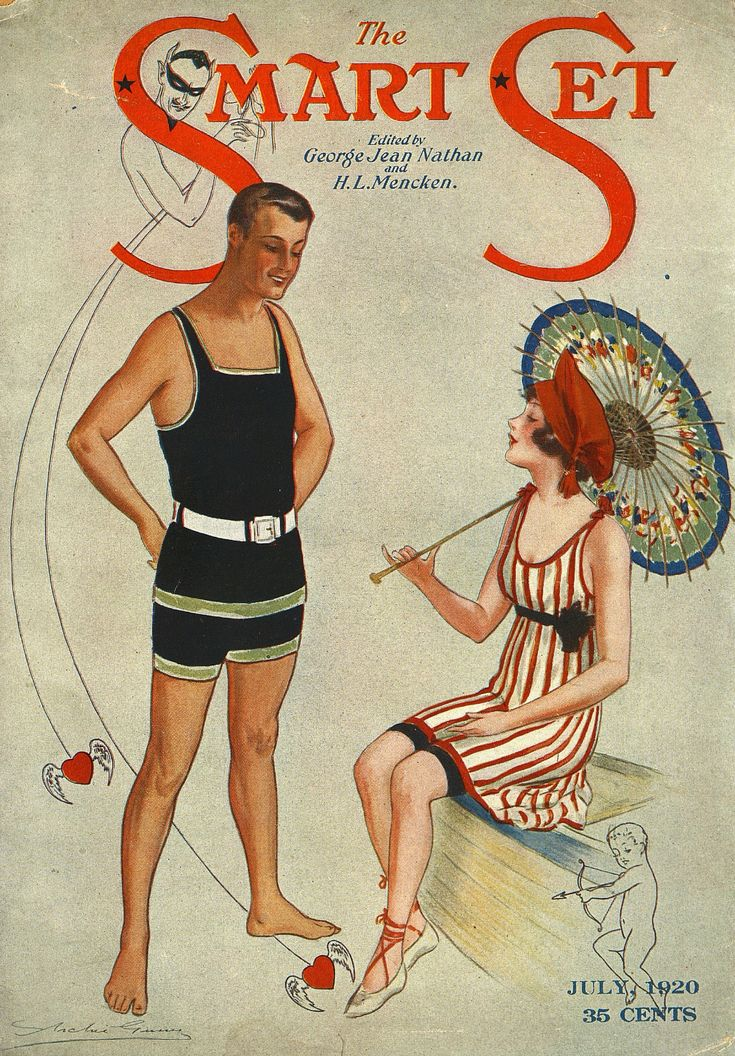
Cover of the July 1920 issue by Archie Gunn

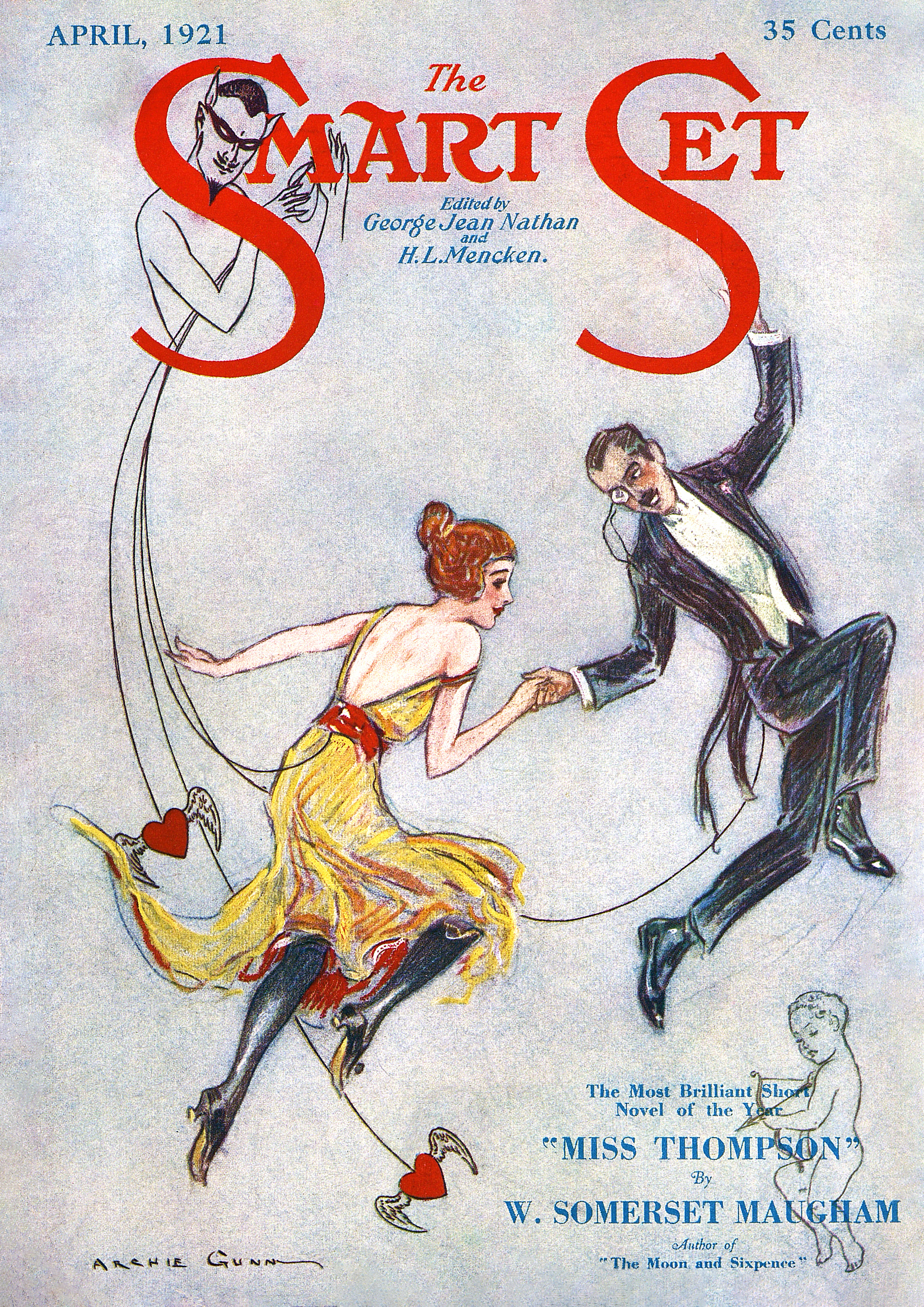
Cover of the April 1921 issue by Archie Gunn

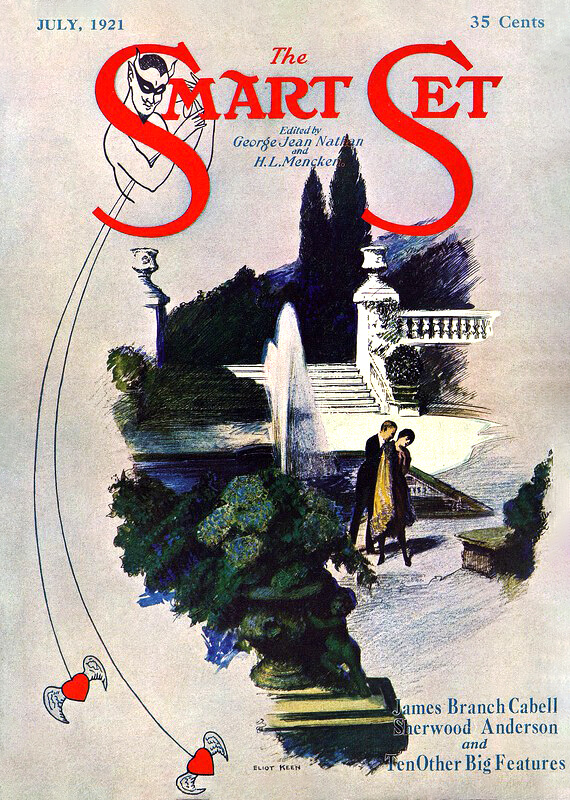
Cover of the July 1921 issue by Eliot Keen

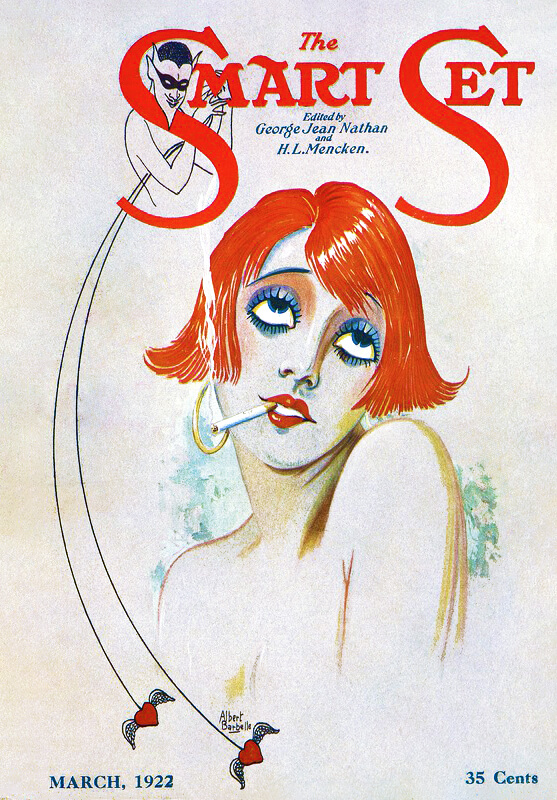
Cover of the March 1922 issue by Albert Barbelle

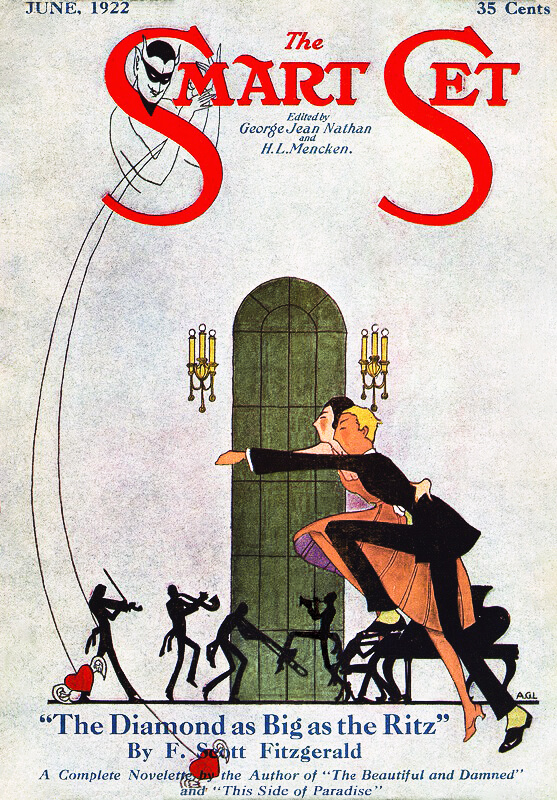
Cover of the June 1922 issue by A.G.L.

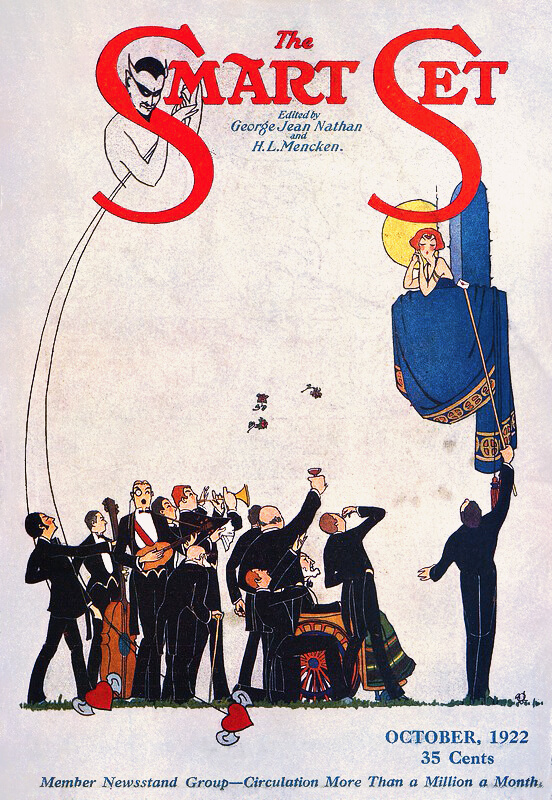
Cover of the October 1922 issue

== British edition ==
A British edition of The Smart Set was published in London from May 1901 to June 1925, running for 290 issues. Initially a straight reprint, it contained increasingly more material. Later issues had art-deco covers. Editors of the British edition were W. J. Thorold (1905–1911), H. J. Gillespie (1911–1915), James W. Milne (1915–1923) and Kitty Shannon (1923–1925).
