= Owen Hatteras =

Major Owen Hatteras (1912–1923) is a composite personage and pseudonym created and employed by H. L. Mencken and George Jean Nathan for The Smart Set literary magazine and adapted by Willard Huntington Wright during his short tenure as editor. The pseudonym was used to critique American (“Puritan”) traditions and ideals, such as marriage, religion, and academe, while protecting Mencken and Nathan's own reputations. First with the “Pertinent & Impertinent” column and eventually the “Americana” column, Hatteras observed and denigrated American institutions, frivolity and sentimentalism, materialism, racism, censorship, and conservatism.

== History ==
Owen Hatteras debuted in April 1912 and appeared regularly until Mencken and Nathan's resignation in 1923, and in April 1919, he was presented as “Major” Owen Hatteras, denoting his decorated service in World War I. During his service, he was still able to write twelve pieces for The Smart Set during the war years, despite Mencken's claim that “Hatteras was too proud to write,” mocking President Woodrow Wilson’s statement that “there is such a thing as a man being too proud to fight.”

The creation of Owen Hatteras was meant to be an experimental prelude to Mencken and Nathan's desired weekly, The Blue Review. In The Blue Review, they intended to lambast traditional American morals and ideologies, mostly using satire, but the magazine never came to fruition. The Smart Set’s publisher, John Adams Thayer, was excited by the idea, but suggested that they first try out the critical tone on their current audience. Thus, they created the “Pertinent and Impertinent” column in April 1912 pseudonymously, though their own signed writings revealed much of the same sentiment. Owen Hatteras, however, could be freely raffish and acerbic. He attacked religion, marriage, morals, manners, capitalism—staples of American life. These American tropes came to be identified by Mencken as “Puritanism,” stripped of the Calvinist implications and loaded with the dated and passé mores instilled by the early American Puritans. Though Hatteras preceded Willard Huntington Wright's editorship, Wright used Hatteras as one supply of the “truth” Wright promised his readers: real characters and people who complicated America's idea of morality and virtue.

When Mencken and Nathan needed to defend themselves against accusations of being communist supporters, contrarily “accused...of being both agents of the Kaiser and the Bolsheviks,” they wrote a satirical biography in 1917, Pistols for Two, and signed it under Owen Hatteras's name. He was thus memorialized in the Library of Congress by cataloguers, who derived his birth year, 1862, from his article earlier in 1917, “Conclusions of a Man of Sixty.” His name was attached to the “Americana” series in May 1923, which reprinted headlines and insipid articles from small towns. Hatteras mocked with false respect the small towns’ editorial efforts, denigrating their inherent racism, pro-War sentiments, Fundamentalism, Prohibition, etc. The “Americana” series continued with Mencken and Nathan in American Mercury, but they dropped Owen Hatteras because he was too playful for their new serious tone.

Though he never became the household name that Mencken and Nathan hoped he would become, Owen Hatteras had a fan following, and he responded regularly to fan mail and invitations to events (that he respectfully had to decline). In the December 1923 issue of Mencken and Nathan's new magazine endeavor, American Mercury, they announced that Owen Hatteras had died, and in response, other magazines and newspapers wrote obituaries of him.

== Publications ==
Listed here are the works attributed to Mencken, though the name Owen Hatteras was sometimes attached to a regular contributor's second or third piece in an issue. Owen Hatteras was revealed as a pseudonym when Mencken later revised and republished certain Hatteras articles under his own name. (All of these articles are available on the Modernist Journals Project)

- “Pertinent and Impertinent,” April 1912 – July 1914
- “Litany for Magazine Editors,” February 1914
- “The Bridge Game and How I beat it to a Finish,” June 1914
- “The Science of Four-Flushing,” October 1914
- “The City of Seven Sundays,” November 1914
- “The Innumerable Caravan,” December 1914
- “Water-Wagon Enchantments,” December 1914
- “A Litany for Music Lovers,” January 1915
- “The Interior Hierarchy,” January 1915
- “Neapolitan Nights,” May 1915
- “Post-Impressions of Poets,” June 1915
- “The Scholar,” July 1915
- “A Snapshot of an Ideal Husband,” September 1915
- “The Exile Returns,” October 1915
- “The Greatest Gift,” November 915
- “The Memory of Edna,” December 1915
- “The Rescuers, a Study in the Art of Protecting Ladies,” January 1916
- “Halls,” April 1916
- “Notes from a Daybook,” April 1916
- “The Bleeding Heart,” May 1916
- “The Puritan,” July 1916
- “A Footnote on the Duel of Sex,” August 1916
- “A Litany for Hangmen,” August 1916
- “The Omission,” November 1916
- “Chanson d’Amour a la Carte,” December 1916
- “The Genius,” June 1917
- “The Conclusions of a Man of Sixty,” July 1917
- “Rosemary, Being Selections from a Romantic Correspondent,” July 1917
- “Being Further Selections of the Conclusions of a Man of Sixty,” August 1917
- “The Conqueror,” August 1917
- “Rosemary, Being Further Selections from a Romantic Correspondent,” October 1917
- “Wall-Paper,” November 1917
- Pistols for Two, 1917
- “Unmentionables: An Inquiry Into the Advertising Pages,” April 1918
- “The Victim,” August 1918
- “The Homeric Sex,” September 1918
- “Meditation,” April 1919 (first time to appear as Major Owen Hatteras)
- “The So-Called Fair,” April 1920
- “A Litany for Bibuli,” November 1920
- “A Panorama of Patriots,” November 1920
- “Conversations Set Down by Major Owen Hatteras,” December 1920 – March 1923
- “A Panorama of Idiots,” January 1921
- “Things I Remember,” February 1921
- “Ad Imaginem Dei Creavit Illum…,” March 1921
- “Melomania,” April 1921
- “Dianthus Caryophyllus,” May 1921
- “A Panorama of Holy Clerks,” June 1921
- “Iron Infallibility,” November 1921
- “Americana,” March – December 1923
