= The Smart Set Anthology =

- cover of first edition
- Editors: Burton Rascoe and Groff Conklin
- Language: English
- Genre: Fiction, poetry, drama, nonfiction
- Publisher: Reynal & Hitchcock
- Publication date: 1934
- Publication place: United States
- Media type: Print (hardcover)
- Pages: xlviii, 844
- OCLC: 00684972

The Smart Set Anthology is an anthology of selections from The Smart Set literary magazine, edited by Burton Rascoe and Groff Conklin. It was first published in hardcover by Reynal & Hitchcock in 1934, and reprinted as The Smart Set Anthology of World Famous Authors by Halcyon House in the same year. It was reissued by Grayson as The Bachelor's Companion in 1944. The book has the distinction of being the first anthology with which Conklin was involved in an editorial capacity; he went on to become a prolific anthologist, mostly of science fiction.

The book comprises a representative sample of the best pieces that had appeared in The Smart Set magazine, collecting works of fiction, poems, articles, plays, and miscellaneous pieces by various authors, together with an introduction by Rascoe. For pieces originally published in the magazine issue dates are provided below.

== Contents ==
- "'Smart Set' History" (introduction) (Burton Rascoe)
- "Orphant Annie" (short story) (Thyra Samter Winslow) - Jun 1923
- "The Sensible Convict" (poem) (William Rose Benét) - Dec 1917
- "How the Lost Causes Were Removed from Valhalla" (short story) (Lord Dunsany) - Oct 1919
- "Notes on the American Gentlewoman" (article) (Thomas Beer) - Nov 1921
- "How I Discovered Bernard Shaw" (article) (Frank Harris) - Jul 1915
- "Ophelia" (poem) (Elinor Wylie) - Oct 1921
- "The End of Ilsa Menteith" (short story) (Lilith Benda) - Aug 1916
- "Narcissus" (poem) (Robert Bridges) - Jun 1914
- "Benediction" (short story) (F. Scott Fitzgerald) - Feb 1920
- "The Three Hermits" (poem) (W. B. Yeats) - Sep 1913
- "Ballade of Youth to Swinburne" (poem) (Orrick Johns) - May 1913
- "From the Memoirs of a Private Detective" (article) (Dashiell Hammett) - Mar 1923
- "Summer Rain" (poem) (Amy Lowell) - Apr 1916
- "Los Angeles the Chemically Pure" (article) (Willard Huntington Wright) - Mar 1913
- "Afterwards" (poem) (Charles Hanson Towne) - Oct 1906
- "A Shepherdess of Fauns" (short story) (F. Tennyson Jesse) - Oct 1913
- "Over the Telephone" (short story) (Aldous Huxley) - Apr 1923
- "The Great Woods" (poem) (Arthur Davison Ficke) - Sep 1923
- "On Cornell" (article) (Hendrik Willem van Loon) - May 1922
- "Carnival" (poem) (Robert Hillyer) - Mar 1924
- "I’m a Stranger Here Myself" (short story) (Sinclair Lewis) - Aug 1916
- "Spoof River Anthology" (poem) (Gordon Seagrove) - Mar 1916
- "The Mowers" (poem) (D. H. Lawrence) - Nov 1913
- "Such a Pretty Little Picture" (short story) (Dorothy Parker) - Dec 1922
- "The Morals of the Mormons" (article) (Louis Sherwin) - Jun 1917
- "The Shadow" (poem) (Witter Bynner) - Dec 1913
- "Some Ladies and Jurgen" (short story) (James Branch Cabell) - Jul 1918
- "Crêpe de Chine" (short story) (James Stephens) - Jul 1918
- "Bagatelle" (poem) (Edwin Markham) - Jul 1911
- "The Eternal Masculine" (short story) (Leonora Speyer) - May 1919
- "Whitemail" (short story) (Joyce Kilmer) - Mar 1914
- "The Rabbit-Hutch" (play) (George Sterling) - Sep 1919
- "Threnody upon a Decadent Art" (article) (Joseph Wood Krutch) - Jan 1921
- "The Commonsense of Monsieur Lebel" (short story) (Achmed Abdullah) - Apr 1917
- "Caste" (short story) (Burton Rascoe) - May 1921
- "Summer Thunder" (short story) (Stephen V. Benét) - Sep 1920
- "Model Ballad of the Cook and the Clairvoyant" (poem) (Guy Wetmore Carryl) - Nov 1930
- "To a Broadway Hotel" (poem) (Christopher Morley) - Mar 1918
- "Blissful Interlude" (short story) (Myron Brinig) - Aug 1921
- "Maxims of Methuselah" (article) (Gelett Burgess) - Jun 1911
- "Donkies" (short story) (Leonid Andreyev) - Dec 1922
- "The Man Who Understood Women" (short story) (Elsie McCormick) - Sep 1917
- "A Flood" (short story) (George Moore) - Nov 1913
- "Freedom" (poem) (Margaret Widdemer) - Mar 1919
- "An Epilogue to Love" (poem) (Arthur Symons) - Feb 1918
- ""All for One and One for All'" (short story) (Dorothy Canfield) - Jul 1904
- "Rose Garland" (poem) (Richard Le Gallienne) - Nov 1910
- "Resurrection" (poem) (Theresa Helburn) - Dec 1915
- "One Day More" (play) (Joseph Conrad) - Feb 1914
- "Kisses in the Train" (poem) (D. H. Lawrence) - Oct 1913
- "Fifty Years Spent" (poem) (Struthers Burt) - Dec 1913
- "Autumn in the Subway" (poem) (J. Thorne Smith, Jr.) - Sep 1917
- "The Story Ashland Told at Dinner" (short story) (Ludwig Lewisohn) - Feb 1919
- "A Song" (poem) (Lizette Woodworth Reese) - Mar 1923
- "Earth and Sea" (poem) (Oliver Gogarty) - Feb 1923
- "Drought" (poem) (Lizette Woodworth Reese) - Jun 1913
- "The Fruit of Misadventure" (short story) (Waldo Frank) - Jul 1915
- "The Fire Is Out in Acheron" (poem) (Maxwell Anderson) - Jan 1921
- " Humoresque in Ham" (short story) (Ben Hecht) - Apr 1918
- "Répétition Générale" (article) (George Jean Nathan) - Jun 1919 (+2)
- "Réveil" (poem) (Donn Byrne) - Oct 1915
- "The Secret of Success" (short story) (Donald Ogden Stewart) - Nov 1921
- "The Renunciatory Gesture" (short story) (Mabel McElliott) - Sep 1921
- "The Peripatetic Prince" (short story) (John Reed) - Jun 1913
- "The Treasure" (short story) (C. Y. Harrison) - Oct 1915
- "The Girl Who Couldn’t Go Wrong" (short story) (Albert Payson Terhune) - Jul 1913
- "Lilith" (poem) (Louis Untermeyer) - Jun 1913
- "Saturday Night Blues" (short story) (Catherine Brody) - Oct 1920
- "The Lotus and the Bottle" (short story) (O. Henry) - Jan 1902
- "A Declaration" (miscellaneous) (Jim Tully) - Dec 1923
- "Sonnet" (poem) (Ben Ray Redman) - Apr 1923
- "The Green Elephant" (short story) (Dashiell Hammett) - Oct 1923
- "An Incident of the Cosmos" (short story) (P. Y. Anderson) - Jun 1923
- "Rum, Reading and Rebellion" (article) (John Macy) - Nov 1921
- "Miss Thompson" (novel) (W. Somerset Maugham) - Apr 1921
- "Rope" (short story) (Charles MacArthur) - Nov 1923
- "And Minstrels Flown with Pride" (poem) (John McClure) - Oct 1920
- "Little Girl" (short story) (Lee Pape) - Apr 1915
- "The Long Voyage Home" (play) (Eugene G. O'Neill) - Oct 1917
- "The Whole Art of the Wooden Leg" (article) (Laurence Stallings) - Mar 1923
- "The Blue Sphere" (short story) (Theodore Dreiser) - Dec 1914
- "The Death of Sir Launcelot" (poem) (Edgar Lee Masters) - Sep 1915
- "Just Him and Her" (short story) (Ruth Suckow) - Jan 1922
- "Slapdasher the Artist" (short story) (Felix Riesenberg) - Apr 1911
- "The Kingdom of Thule" (poem) (Donn Byrne) - Dec 1915
- "The Heart of a Tenor" (play) (Frank Wedekind) - Jun 1913
- "The Boarding House" (short story) (James Joyce)
- "Transvaluation" (poem) (Orrick Johns) - Oct 1917
- "The Sentimentalist" (short story) (Sara Teasdale) - Apr 1916
- "Tearsqueezer" (short story) (Barry Benefield) - Oct 1913
- "The Rural Soul" (article) (Thomas Beer) - Jan 1911
- "The History of a Prodigy" (short story) (Lewis Mumford) - Aug 1921
- "The Regenerate" (short story) (Mazo de la Roche) - Apr 1907
- "Ghosts" (article) (Edgar Saltus) - Jun 1914
- "At Tio Juan" (short story) (Mary Austin) - Jun 1906
- "Jessica Screams" (short story) (Floyd Dell) - Apr 1913
- "The Dead Are Silent" (short story) (Arthur Schnitzler)
- "A Dead One" (poem) (Witter Bynner) - Nov 1913
- "Report of a Sunday Evening Talk at a Sanatorium for Female Alcoholics" (short story) (Christopher Morley) - Apr 1918
- "Not Guilty" (short story) (Llewelyn Powys) - Jul 1921
- "Wow" (short story) (W. B. Seabrook) - Jan 1921
- "The Merry-Go-Round" (short story) (Julia M. Peterkin) - Dec 1921
- "Ashes to Ashes" (short story) (Nunnally Johnson) - May 1923
- "Paris After 8:15" (article) (George Jean Nathan) - Jan 1914
- "The Parasite [Pages from the Book of Broadway]" (novella) (George Bronson-Howard) - Jan 1914
- "Sun Magic" (poem) (Thomas Moult) - Feb 1921
- "Rubies in Crystal" (short story) (Grace H. Flandrau) - Jun 1921
- "Silence" (poem) (Babette Deutsch) - Oct 1917
- "Reflections" (article) (W. L. Werner) - Aug 1921
- "His Stenographer" (poem) (Harriet Monroe) - Jan 1914
- "Aesthetic Jurisprudence" (review) (George Jean Nathan) - Jul 1921
- "Index"
