= Charles Angoff =

American journalist

- Born: April 22, 1902; Minsk
- Died: May 3, 1979 (aged 77); New York City
- Spouse: Sara Freedman
- Children: Nancy Angoff
- Awards: Honorary Doctor of Letters (Fairleigh Dickinson University), Charles Angoff Award (The Literary Review)

Academic work
- Era: 20th Century
- Institutions: Fairleigh Dickinson University
- Main interests: English literature

Charles Angoff (April 22, 1902 – May 3, 1979) was a managing editor of the American Mercury magazine as well as a professor of English of Fairleigh Dickinson University. H. L. Mencken called him "the best managing editor in America." He was also a prolific writer and editor.

== Career ==
=== Background ===
Angoff was born on April 22, 1902, in Minsk, Russia Empire. His father was a tailor named John Jacob Angoff; his mother was named Anna Pollack. In 1908, the Angoffs left Russia and settled near Boston, Massachusetts. By age 12, he began writing poetry. He became a naturalized citizen in 1923.

He studied at Harvard University from 1919 to 1923 on a scholarship and majored in philosophy.

=== Journalism ===
In 1923, Angoff began his career in journalism at a local weekly. He answered an advertisement by H. L. Mencken, who hired him as an assistant in 1925. He worked on the editorial staff of Mencken's American Mercury magazine until 1931, when he became managing editor. He wrote articles for the magazine, either signing them with pseudonyms or publishing them anonymously. Mencken and publisher Alfred Knopf felt Angoff was too leftist and sold the magazine privately in January 1935. Angoff joined the editorial board of The Nation magazine and then became editor of American Spectator until it folded in 1937. From 1943 to 1951, he served as managing editor of the American Mercury.

=== Writing ===
During his final years at the American Mercury, Angoff began publishing more books. When the magazine closed in 1951, he began publishing a series about the Polonskys, a family of assimilating, immigrant Jews. It started with Journey to the Dawn (1951). The trilogy grew to eleven volumes and unfinished twelfth. He wrote a rather controversial biography, H. L. Mencken: A Portrait from Memory (1956) about the subject's anti-Semitism. He wrote several books of poetry.

=== Academics ===
In the mid-1950s, Angoff became an English professor at Fairleigh Dickinson University. He co-founded the quarterly The Literary Review and helped found the Fairleigh Dickinson University Press, launched in 1967.

He retired in 1976 to the Upper West Side of New York City.

== Awards received ==
Angoff was appointed to the Board of Trustees of New York City Community College. He received an honorary Doctor of Letters from Fairleigh Dickinson University (June 1966).

In 1954, he received the National Jewish Book Award for In the Morning Light and again in 1969 for Memory of Autumn. Angoff received various other awards (1954–1977).

== Charles Angoff Award ==
The Literary Review offers an annual Charles Angoff Award for outstanding contributions to the magazine during his tenure as editor from 1957 to 1976.

== Communist leanings ==
According to Whittaker Chambers in his 1952 memoir, Angoff worked closely with him, Maxim Lieber, and John Loomis Sherman after they formed the American Feature Writers Syndicate, a front for communist underground agents as overseas cover. Chambers wrote:

Among Lieber's friends was an editor of the American Mercury (not Eugene Lyons, who was still a U .P. correspondent in Moscow) . He gladly furnished a letter telling all whom it might concern that Charles F. Chase was a news gatherer for the Mercury.

During testimony, members of HUAC identified Angoff as the Mercury person by asking:

- Of John Sherman - "Did you attend a luncheon with Maxim Lieber, Charles Angoff, and Whittaker Chambers in which you discussed these credentials and the purpose of them?"
- Of Maxim Lieber - "Did you attend a luncheon with Charles Angoff and Whittaker Chambers at which you discussed the matter of obtaining credentials for Sherman?"

== Personal life ==
Angoff married Sara Freedman in June 1943. They had a daughter, Nancy Angoff. In 1967, his daughter published Marxism and the English Peasants of 1381: a Dream Deferred.

He died on May 3, 1979, aged 77, survived by his wife and daughter.

== Works ==
In his writings, Angoff may have become best known for his non-fiction and fiction works concerning his former boss, H. L. Mencken, and associate George Jean Nathan. As Time magazine wrote in 1961, "Having fanged his ex-idol non-fictionally in H. L. Mencken: A Portrait from Memory, Angoff releases some fictional venom in The Bitter Spring. Mencken is portrayed as a loud-mouthed vulgarian and an intellectual fraud with but a single saving grace, his love of music..." by the name of "Harry P. Brandt." Regarding his editing of the writings of Nathan, Time wrote, "Mercury associate, Charles Angoff, has reached back over 34 years, dusted off Nathan's personal Five-Foot Shelf of writings (some 39 books) and pieced together a Nathan sampler. Sipped, The World of George Jean Nathan is a delight; swallowed, it leaves a faintly rusty taste on the palate, like water too long in the taps. With malice toward some, Nathan has his say on every subject under his sun."

The following books appear in the Library of Congress.

=== Books ===
- American Spectator
- Real Aims of Catholicism (1928)
- Literary History of the American People (1931)
- World Over In... (1938)
- Palestrina, Savior of Church Music, illustrated by William Brady (1944)
- Adventures in Heaven (1945, 1970)
- Handbook of Libel: A Practical Guide for Editors and Authors (1946, 1966)
- Fathers of Classical Music, illustrated by La Verne Reiss (1947, 1969)
- When I was a Boy in Boston, illustrated by Samuel Gilbert (1947, 1970)
- Journey to the Dawn (1951)
- In the Morning Light (1953)
- Sun at Noon (1955)
- H. L. Mencken, A Portrait from Memory (1956)
- Something About My Father, and Other People (1956)
- Between Day and Dark (1959)
- Bitter Spring (1961)
- Summer Storm (1963)
- Tone of the Twenties, and Other Essays (1966)
- Bell of Time: A Book of Poems, foreword by Joseph Joel Keith (1967)
- Memoranda for tomorrow; a book of poems (1968)
- Memory of Autumn (1968)
- Stories from the Literary Review (1969)
- Winter Twilight (1970)
- Prayers at Midnight: A Book of Prose Poems (1971)
- Season of mists (1971)
- Mid-Century (1973)
- Emma Lazarus, Poet, Jewish Activist, Pioneer Zionist (1979)
- Toward the Horizon (1980)

=== Edited works ===
- Arsenal for Skeptics, edited by Richard W. Hinton (pseudonym) (1934)
- Stradivari, the Violin-Maker, by Helen Tinyanova (1938)
- Theatre Book of the Year, by George Jean Nathan (1943)
- American Mercury Reader: A Selection of Distinguished Articles, Stories, and Poems Published in the American Mercury during the Past Twenty Years, edited by Lawrence Spivak and Charles Angoff (1944, 1979)
- Five Minute Classics, by Julius Washington (1945)
- Modern Stories from Many Lands: [The Literary Review Book], selected and edited by Clarence R. Decker [and] Charles Angoff (1963, 1972)
- Humanities in the Age of Science: In Honor of Peter Sammartino, edited by Charles Angoff (1968)
- African Writing Today: Ethiopia, Ghana, Kenya, Nigeria, Sierra Leone, Uganda, Zambia, selected and edited by Charles Angoff [and] John Povey (1969)
- George Sterling: A Centenary Memoir-Anthology, edited by Charles Angoff (1969)
- Rise of American Jewish literature: An Anthology of Selections from the Major Novels, edited by Charles Angoff and Meyer Levin (1970)
- Diamond Anthology, edited by Charles Angoff [and others], foreword by Charles Angoff (1971)
- Papers and Discussions by Conrad Cherry [and Others], edited by Charles Angoff (1974)
- William Carlos Williams: Papers by Kenneth Burke [and Others], edited by Charles Angoff (1974)
- Science and the Human Imagination: Albert Einstein: Papers and Discussions, by Jeremy Bernstein and Gerald Feinberg (1978)
- Biology and the Future of Man: Papers, by Nathan Hershey, Merril Eisenbud, edited by Charles Angoff (1978)
- World of George Jean Nathan: Essays, Reviews & Commentary, edited by Charles S. Angoff; epilogue by Patricia Angelin (1998)

=== Books in Angoff's honor ===
- Old Century and the New: Essays in Honor of Charles Angoff, edited by Alfred Rosa (1978)
- Man from the Mercury: A Charles Angoff Memorial Reader, edited, with an introduction by Thomas Yoseloff (1986)
