= James Jebusa Shannon =

American-British painter (1862–1923)

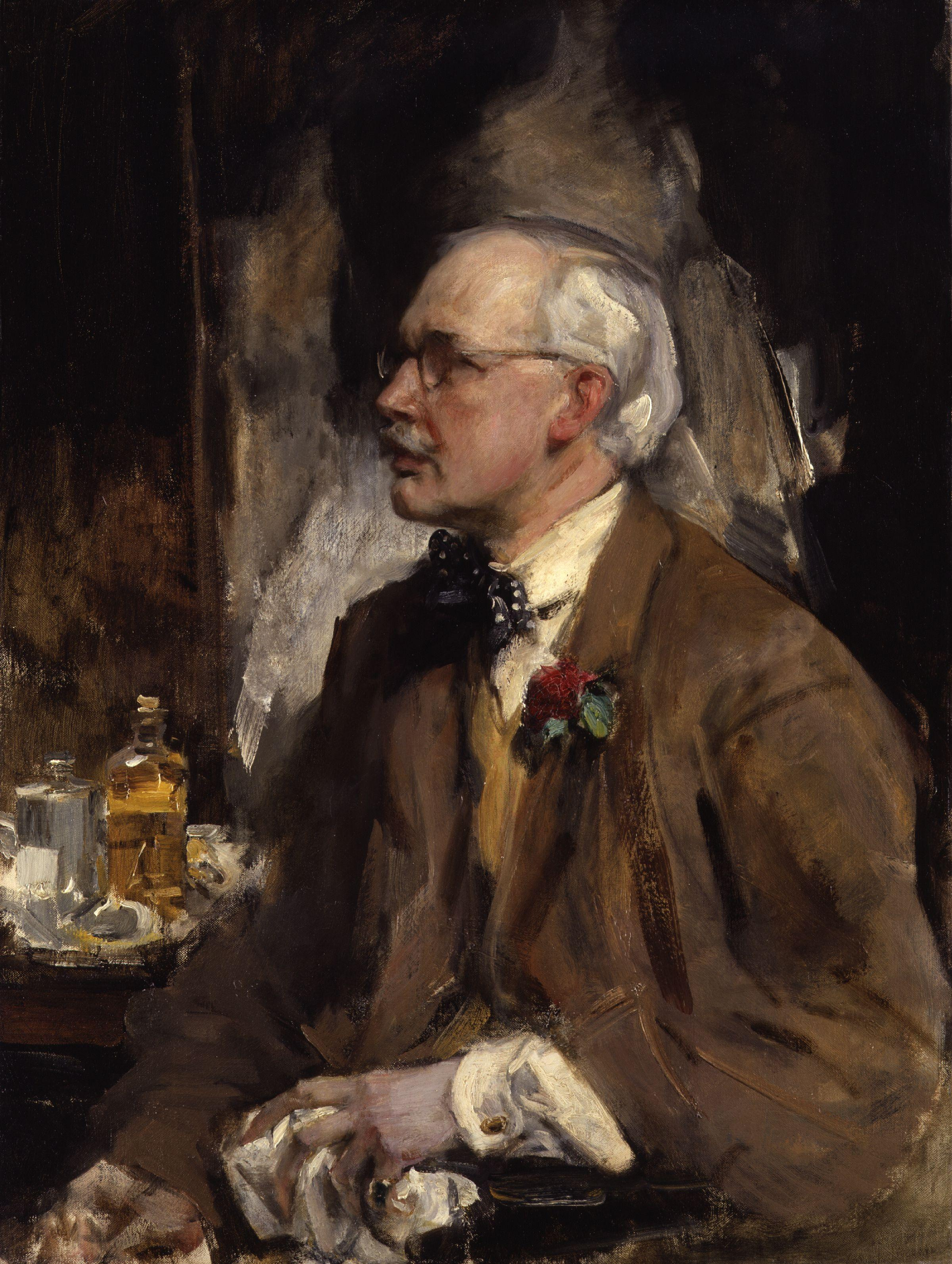
Self-portrait of James Jebusa Shannon, circa 1919

Sir James Jebusa Shannon RA (3 February 1862 – 6 March 1923) was an Anglo-American artist. In 1886 he married Florence Mary Cartwright (d. 1948), with whom he had an only child, the illustrator Kitty Shannon (1887–1974).

== Life ==
Shannon was born in Auburn, New York, and at the age of eight was taken by his parents to Canada. When he was sixteen, he went to England, where he studied at South Kensington, and after three years won the gold medal for figure painting. His portrait of the Hon. Horatia Stopford, one of the queen's maids of honour, attracted attention at the Royal Academy in 1881, and in 1887 his portrait of Henry Vigne of the Epping Forest Harriers in hunting costume was one of the successes of the exhibition, subsequently securing medals for the artist at Paris, Berlin, and Vienna.

He soon became one of the leading portrait painters in London. He was one of the first members of the New English Art Club, a founder member of the Royal Society of Portrait Painters and in 1897 was elected an associate of the Royal Academy, and RA in 1909. His picture The Flower Girl was bought in 1901 for the national collection at Tate. Shannon was named as co-respondent in a divorce case. In 1902, he exhibited the portrait of Mrs Fred Elliott at the Royal Academy. On 30 September 1902, the husband of Mrs Fred Elliott filed divorce proceedings: petitioner Frederick John Elliott, respondent Sophia Jane Elliott and co-respondent James Jebusa Shannon.

Shannon has paintings in the collection of several British institutions including Sheffield, Derby Art Gallery, Glasgow Museum and Bradford Museum. A memorial to him lies in St James's Church, Piccadilly.

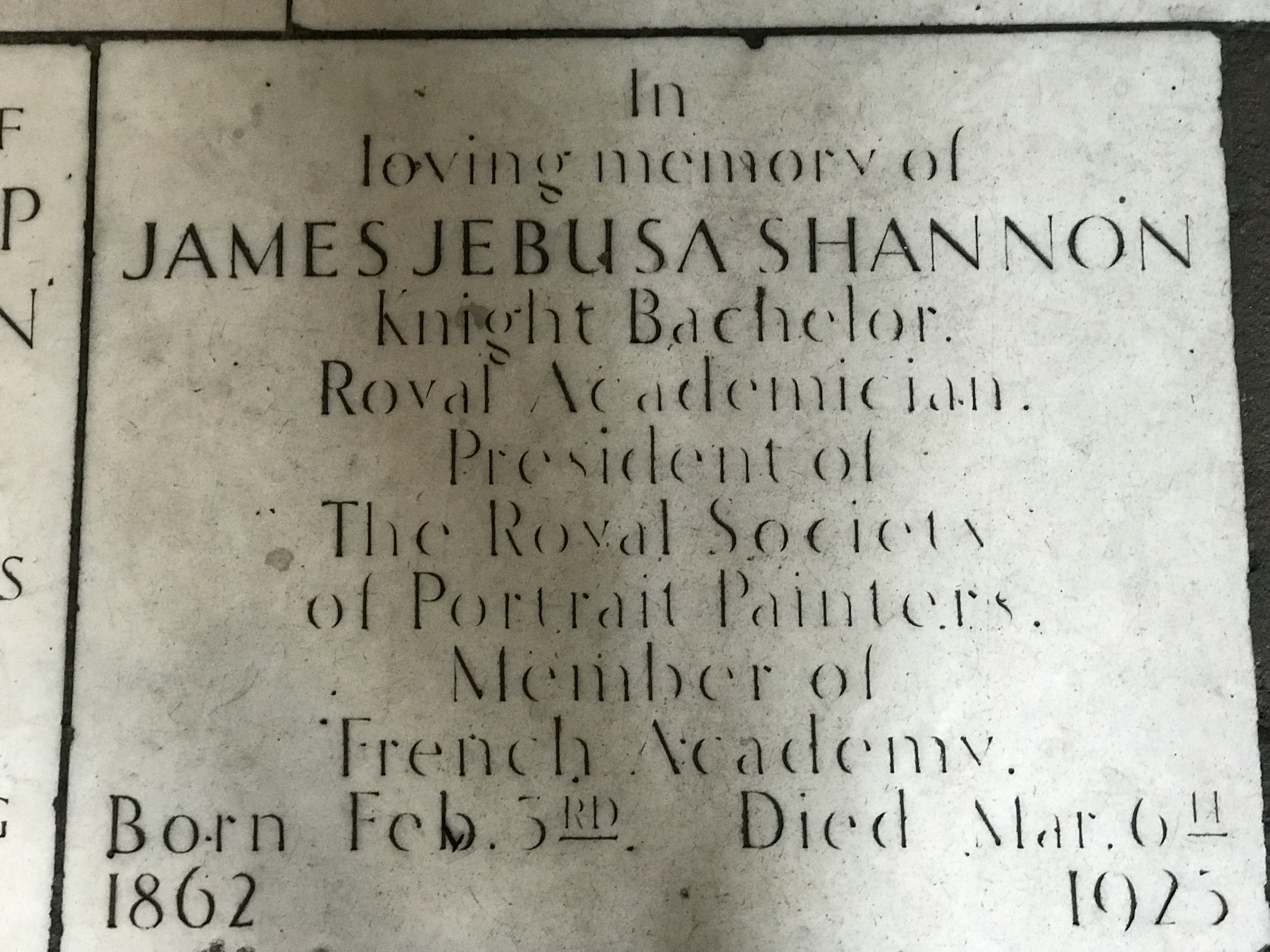
A memorial to James Jebusa Shannon in St James's Church, Piccadilly.

== Gallery ==
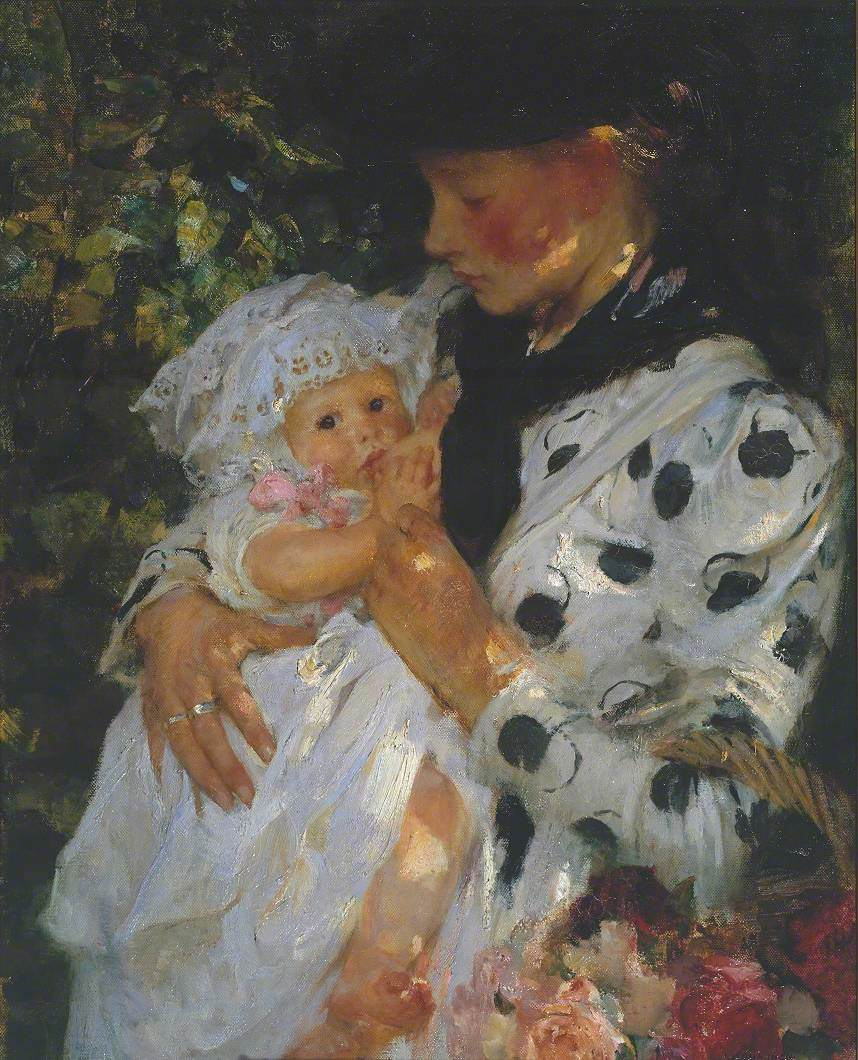
The Flower Girl, 1900

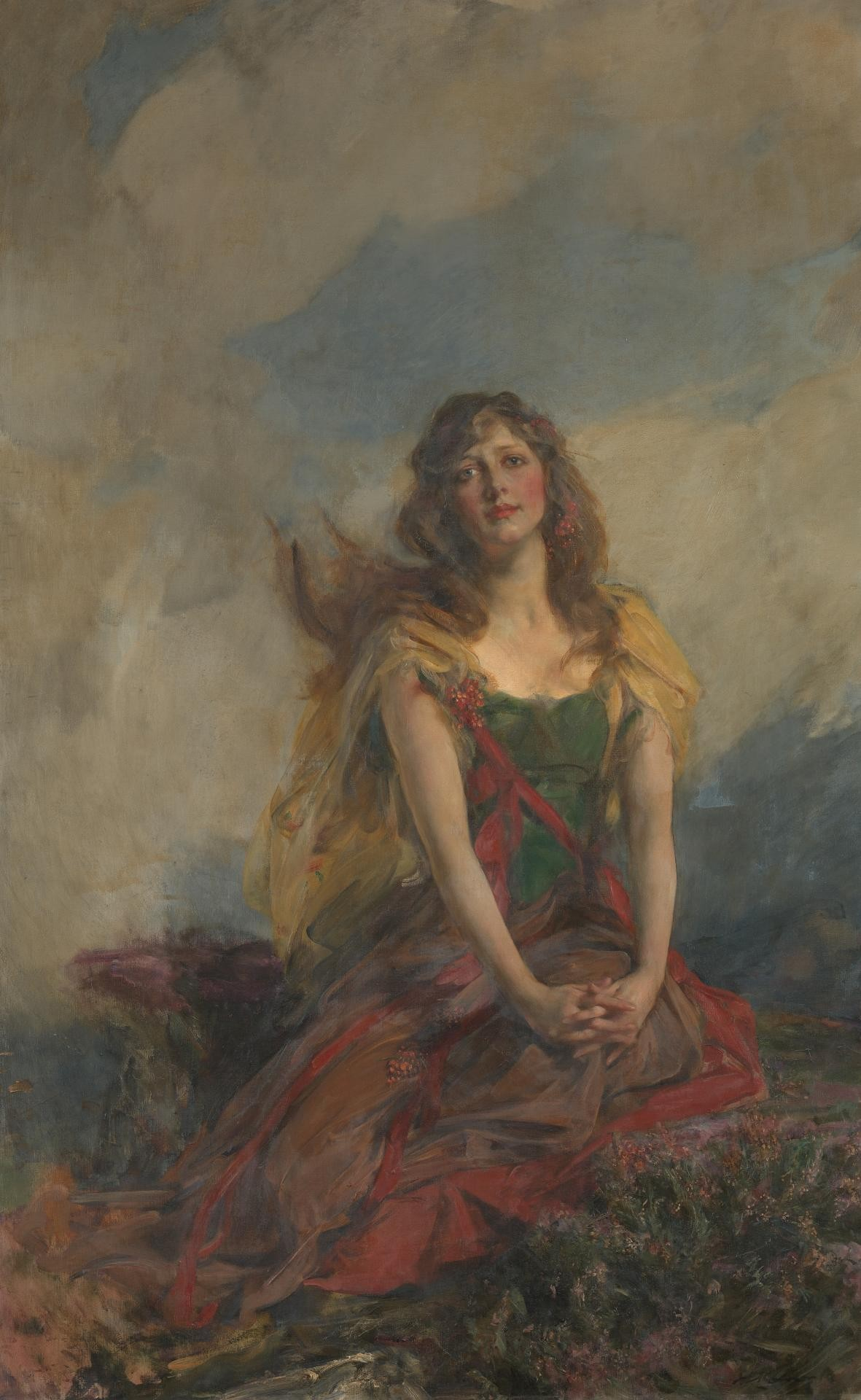
Marie Lohr as Lady Babbie, 1914

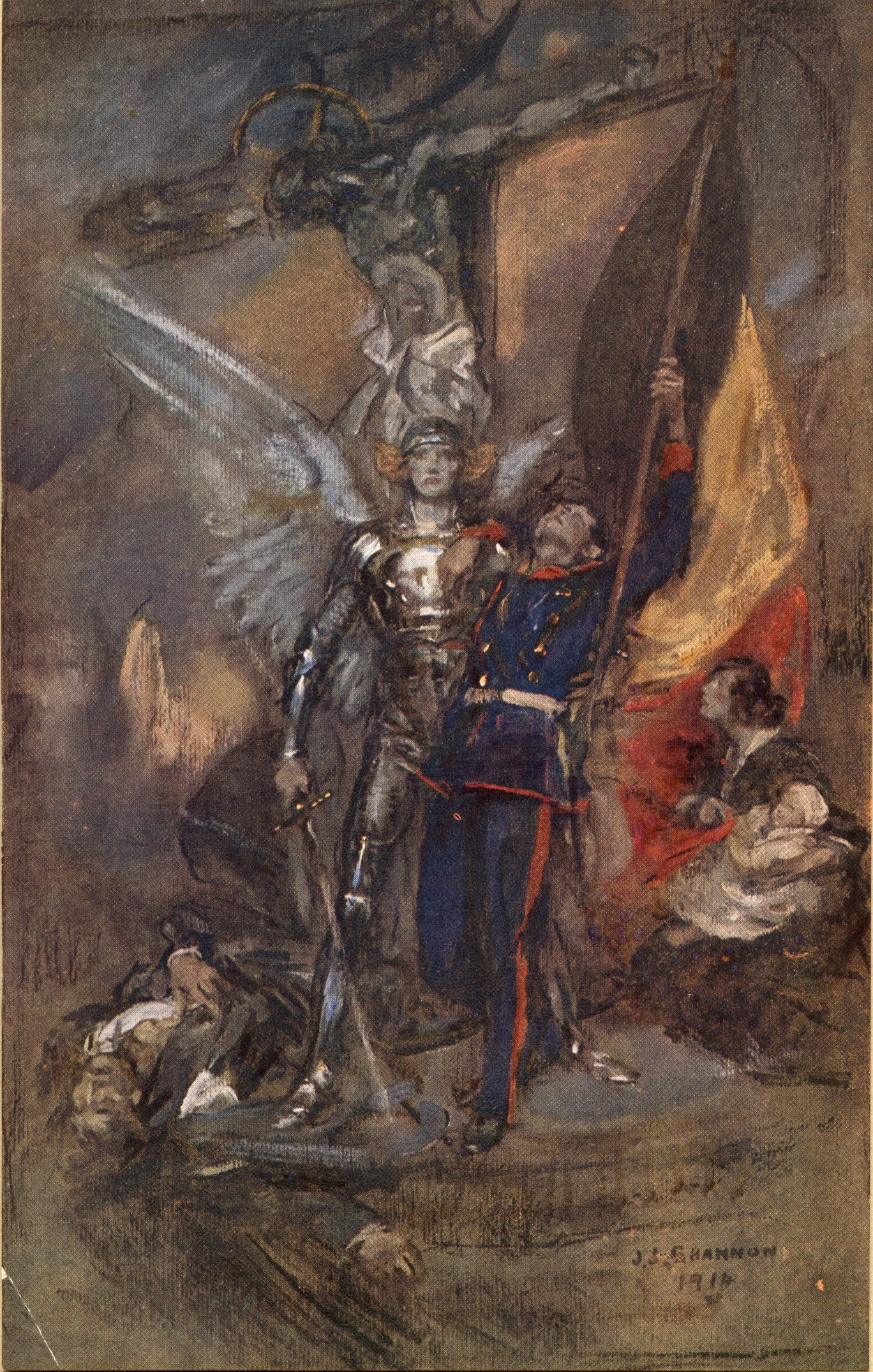
St. Michael of Belgium, 1914
