= American Spectator (literary magazine) =

Literary magazine published from 1932 to 1937

- Categories: Literary magazine
- Frequency: Monthly
- Founder: George Jean Nathan Eugene O'Neill, Ernest Boyd, Theodore Dreiser, and James Branch Cabell
- First issue: November 1932; 93 years ago
- Final issue: May 1937
- Company: The American Spectator, Inc.
- Country: United States
- Language: English

The American Spectator was a monthly literary magazine which made its first monthly appearance in November 1932. It was edited by George Jean Nathan, though Eugene O'Neill, Ernest Boyd, Theodore Dreiser, and James Branch Cabell were also listed as joint editors. The original editors left the publication in 1935, after which the paper continued monthly publication under new editors until October 1936. The American Spectator lasted another six months on a bimonthly before folding altogether.

Sherwood Anderson first published his short story "Brother Death" in this journal. In 1933, the journal published a discussion, including some humor that not everyone recognized, on the Jewish question.

== Anticipation ==
The publication was heralded before the first issue had even been published. A mainstream newspaper gossip columnist wrote: "New York's literati are in a furious flutter over the last word in literary high-hatting which is to be launched. ... Nathan and Boyd will be the office editors and O'Neill, Lewis and Dreiser, editorial writers ... contributors will only contribute by special invitation from the editors. ... Payment for material to editors and other contributors will be one cent a word. No salaries whatever are to be paid Nathan and Boyd until financial conditions, if ever, warrant it. ... Contributors who have consented include Sinclair Lewis, Ernest Hemingway, Thomas Mann, James Joyce, William Faulkner." None of those famous authors were ever published in The American Spectator, but the paper went on to become successful nonetheless.

== Mission ==
The American Spectator laid out its mission and purpose in an editorial in the first issue:

The American Spectator has no policy in the common sense of that word. ... Sincerity, authenticity, and passion are its editorial criterion. Its aim is to offer a medium for the truly valuable and adventurous in thought, and to invite contributions from every quarter where stimulating opinions may be expected Clarity, vigor, and humor and the three indispensable qualities which must inform the presentation of its ideas. Real knowledge and a decided point of view will replace the usual conventional comment on irrelevant or foregone conclusions.

The essential editorial problem of the better and more ambitious type of monthly magazine is that it is much too large. ... Another defect of the average magazine is that its editor often permits himself to remain in harness long after his imaginative oats have given out and the magazine thereafter continues simply as a matter of habit. The moment the editors feel that The American Spectator is becoming a routine job, is getting dull and is similarly continuing as a matter of habit, they will call it a day and will retire in a body to their estates.

The editors of The American Spectator have invited distinguished writers in America, England, France, Germany, Austria and Italy to join them in contributing to its columns, and the almost unanimous response has been immensely gratifying. Each invited writer has been asked to write on what interests him most at the moment and each writer will be his own editor. It will be the policy of The American Spectator, in short, to have no policy that will in any way interfere with or restrain any expression of opinion that any of its invited writers may desire to offer ...

Articles were capped at 2,000 words and the newspaper refused to sell advertising. The first issue was so successful that an additional 20,000 copies had to be printed to meet demand, despite what was then considered a high price of 50 cents. Subsequent issues sold for 10 cents.

== The Jewish Question ==
The September 1933 issue featured a roundtable about the Jewish people's movement for a homeland titled "Editorial Conference (With Wine)." The piece was intended to be funny, but not received as humorous. Instead it was widely criticized as antisemitic. The statements of Boyd, Nathan, O'Neill, and Cabell were openly derisive of Jewish people and their desire for a homeland. Dreiser, although in favor of a Jewish homeland, was nonetheless seen as antisemitic because he made stereotypical comments about the "shrewdness" of Jews when it came to money.

American journalist Hutchins Hapgood was among the most vocal critics of the piece, attacking Drieser as antisemitic in a letter that The American Spectator refused to publish. Hapgood's letter was finally published in the April 1935 issue of the Nation.

== Anti-Hitler position ==
The editors of The American Spectator were among the first Americans to question the rise of fascism in Germany and to denounce the Nazi party. In an August 1933 front-page editorial, the paper warned about the imminent problems of Hitler's thinking. "That recently naturalized German, Herr Adolf Hitler, has undertaken to define Germanism and Aryanism with such a complete disregard for the ascertainable facts of biology, anthropology and German history that one wearily realizes that nothing but a reversal to medieval methods can help him and his followers in an intellectually indefensible position. ... In brief, we turn back the clock of history, but the smell of tortured, burning flesh, the shadows of the Dark Ages, hang about it still."

== Staff additions ==
In 1933, American etiquette expert Amy Vanderbilt came on as business manager for the publication.

In 1934 Dreiser urged Sherwood Anderson to join the editorial board of the paper, and Anderson accepted the offer despite the lack of pay. The position, Anderson wrote in a letter, "would give me an outlet and association with some very interesting men." At one point, Anderson's friends advised him to send a piece he wrote to the more prestigious publication The Atlantic, but he gave it to The American Spectator out of a sense of loyalty.

== Political agenda ==
As a member of the editorial board from November 1932 until February 1934, Theodore Dreiser sought to steer the paper towards a leftist agenda. Although he solicited contributions from Russian acquaintances, Marxist painter Diego Rivera, pro-labor journalist Bruce Crawford, and technocracy leader Howard Scott, Dreiser was mostly unsuccessful at turning the paper into a voice for the left political agenda. However, Dreiser did succeed at giving ink to issues such as railroad reform, birth control, and the criminal justice system.

Dreiser's political agenda was stymied by his coeditors, namely Nathan and Boyd, who rejected many of his attempted contributions to the content of the paper. Theodore Dreiser wrote a letter to British novelist John Cowper Powys on September 8, 1932, describing the purpose of The American Spectator, and invited him to submit work for publication. In November 1932, Dreiser again writes to Powys explaining that his co-editors would not allow him to publish his article. Dreiser was further irritated by his belief that Nathan and Boyd were averse to articles about social and economic issues. The conflict led to Dreiser's resignation in January 1934, and his name appeared in the masthead for the final time in February 1934.

== Founding editors depart ==
The founding editors (minus Dreiser and plus Anderson) made good on their promise from the first issue to leave the paper once they no longer enjoyed the work. A February 28, 1935, article in The New York Times announced their intentions: "Following their pledge of thirty months ago that when they tired of editing The American Spectator they would "retire to their estates," the editors announced yesterday the discontinuance of the periodical. The editors are George Jean Nathan, Ernest Boyd, Eugene O'Neill, James Branch Cabell and Sherwood Anderson.".

It was reported that the publication was turning a profit of $1,000 per month, but the enterprise had evolved into a "property" as opposed to a "diversion".

Charles Angoff served as editor from 1935 to 1936, and Max Lehman was editor until the final issue in May 1937.
