= The American Mercury =

US magazine (1924–1981)

- American Mercury with Al Hirschfeld's caricature of Ernest Hemingway, November 1950
- Frequency: Monthly
- Founder: H. L. Mencken and George Jean Nathan
- Founded: 1924
- Final issue: 1981
- Country: United States
- Based in: New York City
- ISSN: 0002-998X

The American Mercury was an American magazine published from 1924 to 1981. It was founded as the brainchild of H. L. Mencken and drama critic George Jean Nathan. The magazine featured writing by some of the most important writers in the United States through the 1920s and 1930s.

After a change in ownership in the 1940s, the magazine attracted conservative writers, including William F. Buckley. A second change in ownership in the 1950s turned the magazine into a far-right and antisemitic publication.

It was published monthly in New York City. The magazine went out of business in 1981.

== History ==
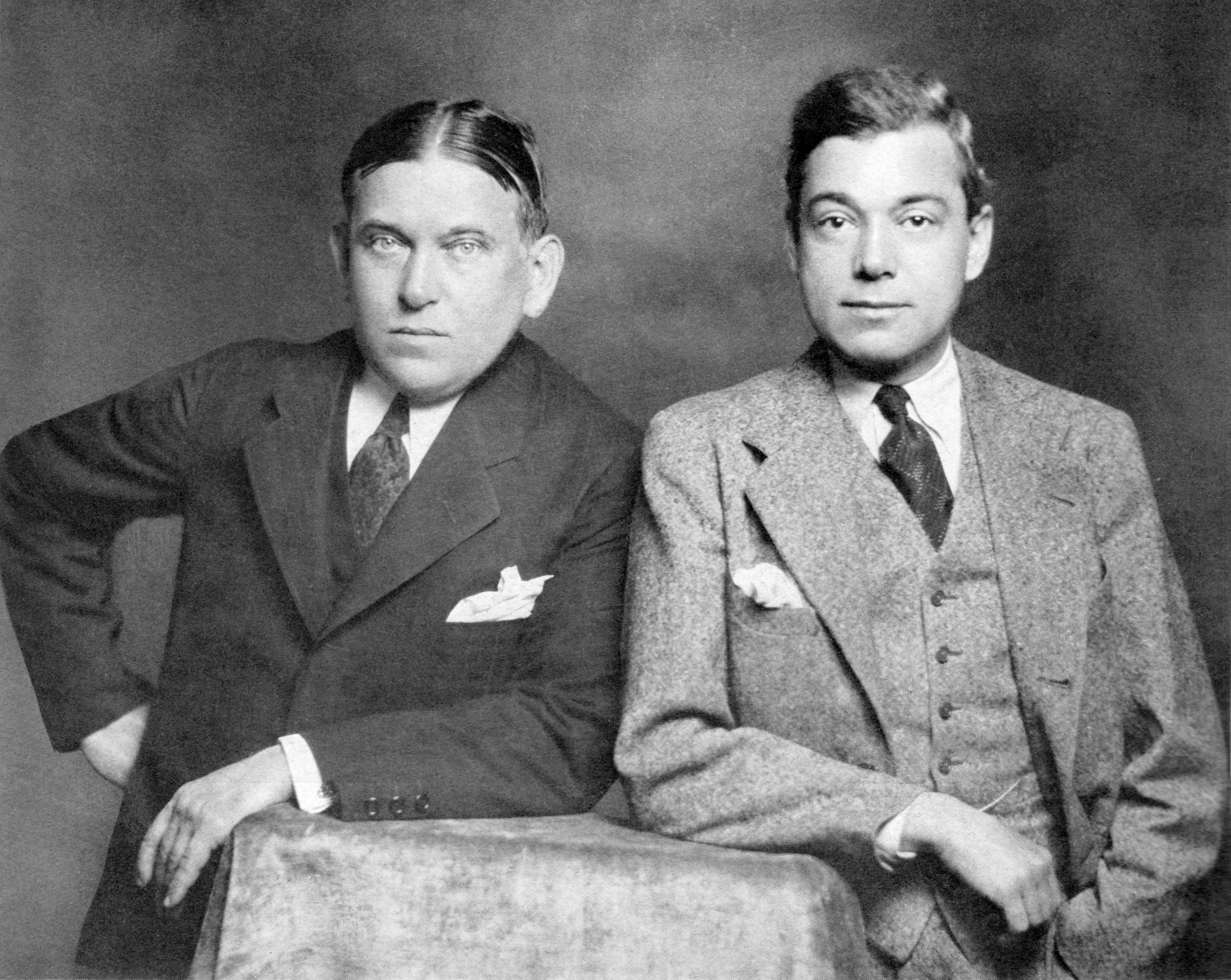
H. L. Mencken and George Jean Nathan in 1928

H. L. Mencken and George Jean Nathan had previously edited The Smart Set literary magazine, when not producing their own books and, in Mencken's case, regular journalism for The Baltimore Sun. With their mutual book publisher Alfred A. Knopf Sr. serving as the publisher, Mencken and Nathan created The American Mercury as "a serious review, the gaudiest and damnedest ever seen in the Republic", as Mencken explained the name (derived from a 19th-century publication) to his old friend and contributor Theodore Dreiser:

What we need is something that looks highly respectable outwardly. The American Mercury is almost perfect for that purpose. What will go on inside the tent is another story. You will recall that the late P. T. Barnum got away with burlesque shows by calling them moral lectures.

From 1924 through 1933, Mencken aimed to provide elegantly irreverent observations of America, aimed at what he called "Americans realistically", those of sophisticated skepticism of enough that was popular and much that threatened to be. Nathan was forced to resign as his co-editor a year after the magazine started. Simeon Strunsky in The New York Times said that, "The dead hand of the yokelry on the instinct for beauty cannot be so heavy if the handsome green and black cover of The American Mercury exists." The quote was used on the subscription form for the magazine during its heyday.

The January 1924 issue sold more than 15,000 copies, and by the end of the first year the circulation was over 42,000. In early 1928, the circulation reached a height of over 84,000, but declined steadily after the stock market crash of 1929. The magazine published writing by Conrad Aiken, Sherwood Anderson, James Branch Cabell, W. J. Cash, Lincoln Ross Colcord, Thomas Craven, Clarence Darrow, W. E. B. Du Bois, John Fante, William Faulkner, F. Scott Fitzgerald, Albert Halper, Langston Hughes, James Weldon Johnson, Zora Neale Hurston, Sinclair Lewis, Meridel LeSueur, Edgar Lee Masters, Victor Folke Nelson, Albert Jay Nock, Eugene O'Neill, Carl Sandburg, William Saroyan, and George Schuyler. Nathan provided theater criticism, and Mencken wrote the "Editorial Notes" and "The Library", the last being book reviews and social critique, placed at the back of each volume. The magazine published other writers, from newspapermen and academics to convicts and taxi drivers, but its primary emphasis soon became non-fiction and usually satirical essays. Its "Americana" section—containing items clipped from newspapers and other magazines nationwide—became a much-imitated feature. Mencken used aphorisms printed in the magazine's margins whenever space allowed.

=== Mencken's departure ===
Mencken retired as editor of the magazine at the end of 1933. His chosen successor was economist and literary critic Henry Hazlitt. Differences with the publisher, Alfred A. Knopf Sr., led Hazlitt to resign after four months. The American Mercury was next edited by Mencken's former assistant Charles Angoff.

In January 1935, The American Mercury was purchased from Alfred A. Knopf, Inc., by Lawrence E. Spivak. The magazine's longtime business manager, Spivak announced that he would take an active role as publisher. Paul Palmer, former Sunday editor of the New York World, replaced Angoff as editor, and playwright Laurence Stallings was named literary editor.

=== Radio and television ===
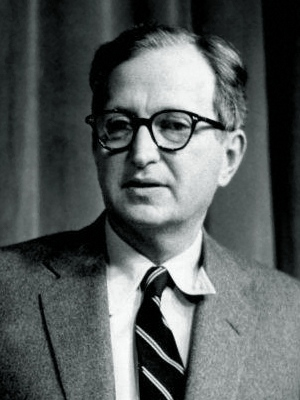
Lawrence E. Spivak in 1960

Spivak revived the Mercury for a brief but vigorous period—Mencken, Nathan, and Angoff contributed essays to the magazine again. Spivak created a company to publish the magazine, Mercury Publications. Soon, the company began publishing other magazines, including Ellery Queen's Mystery Magazine (1941) and The Magazine of Fantasy & Science Fiction in 1949.

In 1945, as editor, Lawrence Spivak created a radio program called American Mercury Presents "Meet the Press". It started on television on November 6, 1947, as Meet the Press.

In 1946, the Mercury merged with the democratic-socialist magazine Common Sense. By 1950, the Mercury was owned by Clendenin J. Ryan. He changed the magazine's name to The New American Mercury. Ryan was the financial angel for Ulius Amoss, a former Office of Strategic Services agent who specialized in operating spy networks behind the Iron Curtain to destabilize Communist governments and the publisher of International Services of Information in Baltimore;his son Clendenin Jr. was a sponsor of William F. Buckley Jr. and the Young Americans for Freedom. Ryan transformed The American Mercury in a conservative direction.

=== Huie's experiment ===
William Bradford Huie (Note: William Bradford Huie should not be confused with Bradford L. Huie, which is an apparent pseudonym of the author of a 2013 American Mercury article that has been widely distributed on white nationalist Internet forums.)—whose work had appeared in the magazine before—had gleaned the beginning of a new, post-World War II American conservative intellectual movement. He sensed that Ryan had begun to guide The American Mercury toward that direction. He also introduced more mass-appeal writing, by figures such as Reverend Billy Graham and Federal Bureau of Investigation director J. Edgar Hoover. Huie seemed en route to producing a conservative magazine. William F. Buckley Jr., whose God and Man at Yale was a best seller, worked for Huie's Mercury, as a young staffer. In 1955, Buckley founded the longer-living conservative National Review. Buckley would steer the periodical to bring together the nascent but differing strands of this new conservative movement.

=== Antisemitic and racist takeover ===
Huie faced financial difficulties sustaining the Mercury in this new direction. In August 1952, he sold it to an occasional financial contributor, Russell Maguire, owner of the Auto-Ordnance Corporation. Rather than turn over editorial control to Maguire, Huie stepped down as editor after the January 1953 issue. He was replaced by John A. Clements, a former reporter for the New York Journal and Daily Mirror, then director of public relations for the Hearst Corporation. The sale to Maguire spelled the end of The American Mercury as a mainstream magazine. for the next 30 years, until it closed.

Maguire's antisemitism led to controversy and the resignation of the magazine's top editors after he took control of the editorial process in 1955. In 1956, George Lincoln Rockwell was hired as a writer, and later became the founder of the American Nazi Party. Between 1957 and 1958, William LaVarre served as editor. In January 1959, Maguire published an American Mercury editorial supporting a theory that there was a Jewish conspiracy for world domination.

Maguire did not remain long as the magazine's owner/publisher, but other owners continued in that direction. Maguire sold the Mercury to the Defenders of the Christian Faith, Inc. (DCF), owned by Reverend Gerald Burton Winrod and located in Wichita, Kansas, in 1961. Winrod had been charged for violations of the Sedition Act of 1918; the charges were later dropped. He had been known as "The Jayhawk Nazi" during World War II.

The DCF sold it in 1963 to the "Legion for the Survival of Freedom" of Jason Matthews. The LSF cut a deal in June 1966 with the original Washington Observer, finally merging with Western Destiny, a Liberty Lobby publication owned by Willis Carto and Roger Pearson, a major recipient of Pioneer Fund grants in history. Pearson was a well-known neo-Nazi and pro-Fascist who headed the World Anti-Communist League during its most blatantly pro-Fascist periods. He was a close associate of Wickliffe Draper, founder of the Pioneer Fund.

A 1978 article praised Adolf Hitler as the "greatest Spenglerian" and lamented his death. Another new ownership for the troubled magazine was announced in the autumn of 1979, and the spring 1980 issue celebrated Mencken's centennial, and lamented the passage of his era, describing it as one "before the virus of social, racial, and sexual equality" grew in "fertile soil in the minds of most Americans".

== Website ==
A website called The American Mercury was created in 2010. It was criticized by the Southern Poverty Law Center in the Winter 2013 edition of their magazine Intelligence Report, which called it a "Leo Frank Propaganda Site" and described it as "a resurrected and deeply anti-Semitic online version of H. L. Mencken’s defunct magazine of the same name". The Anti-Defamation League calls it "an extreme right-wing site with anti-Semitic content", while The Forward referred to it as "H.L. Mencken’s historic magazine, resurrected online by neo-Nazis several years ago", which had "published several revisionist articles to coincide with this year’s anniversary" of the Leo Frank trial.
