= Burton Rascoe =

American journalist and critic (1892–1957)

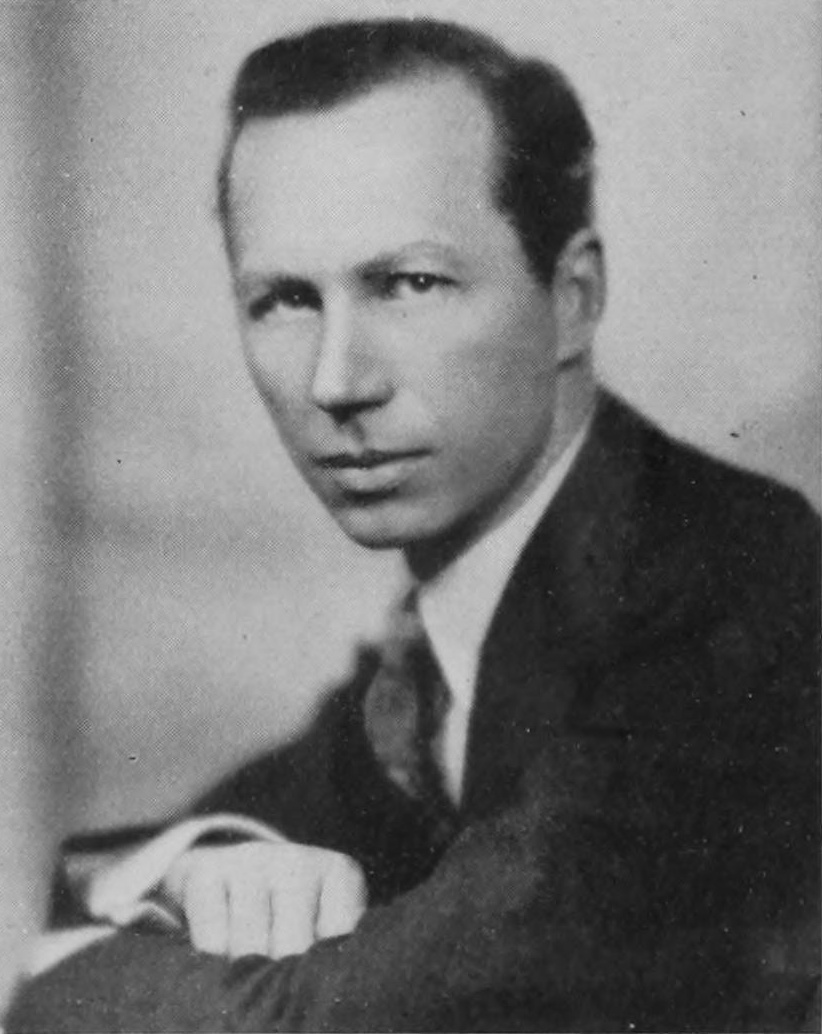
- Born: October 22, 1892; Fulton, Kentucky, US
- Died: March 19, 1957 (aged 64); New York City, US
- Education: University of Chicago
- Occupations: Editor and literary critic
- Spouse: Hazel Adelaide Luke (m. 1913)
- Children: 2

External images
- https://gallery.library.vcu.edu/items/show/79795 From left to right: Burton Rascoe, Ellen Glasgow, James Branch Cabell, Priscilla Bradley Shepherd Cabell and Elliott White Springs, 1928.
- http://www.philipwildenstam.se/wp-content/uploads/burtonrascoe.jpg Undated image of Burton Rascoe, probably 1930s or 1940s.

Arthur Burton Rascoe (October 22, 1892 – March 19, 1957), was an American journalist, editor and literary critic of the New York Herald Tribune.

He was born in Fulton, Kentucky to Matthew L. Rascoe and Elizabeth Burton Rascoe. His father chose to investigate business prospect in Oklahoma Territory, and the family eventually settled in Shawnee, Oklahoma, which, despite fears planted by friends in Fulton, was a thriving community. Housing had not kept up with the influx of citizens and the Rascoe family was left to small dismal accommodations, something Mrs. Rascoe never overcame. Burton, however, grabbed at every opportunity to find work and educate himself outside the school system. While serving as a class officer at Shawnee High School he played baseball and played quarterback on the football team after earning 30 dollars digging potatoes to purchase his uniform. He began a paper route for the Shawnee Herald but soon put himself in charge of all the other newsboys. He also worked as assistant librarian at the town's Carnegie Library, was a ghost writer for citizens who were called on to make speeches or publish articles, a stringer for the Oklahoma City Times and writing articles for the Herald, all this while attending classes. His father continued to struggle supporting his family and by 16 Burton was supporting himself. Feeling ready and recognizing his more open-minded views he left school before graduation and moved to Chicago. From 1911 until 1913, he attended the University of Chicago where he joined Sigma Nu. While still a student, he started writing for the Chicago Tribune and continued working there until 1920.

In 1922, he became literary editor of the New York Tribune. He continued in that position until a merger turned the paper into the New York Herald Tribune in 1924. The writing and editorial staff he assembled included writers who became well-respected: Isabel Paterson and Will Cuppy.

Rascoe's syndicated column, The Daybook of a New Yorker (1924–28), appeared in over 400 newspapers.

In April 1927, with Seward B. Collins, Rascoe purchased The Bookman. Rascoe served as editor before departing in April 1928 in a disagreement with Collins over the direction of the magazine.

Rascoe continued to hold high-profile editorial jobs in the field of literary criticism and to write books of his own about literature and authors. In 1935 he was appointed a senior editor at Doubleday, Doran, holding this post until 1952. His best-known work, Titans of Literature, appeared in 1932. He also authored Before I Forget, an autobiography of sorts revealing much of his upbringing in Oklahoma. The book gives a good insight to life for a young man during the early days of the 20th century. Other works include Theodore Dreiser(1925), A Bookman's Daybook (1929), The Smart Set Anthology, edited together with Groff Conklin (1934), The Joys of Reading: Life's Greatest Pleasure (1937) and Belle Starr, The Bandit Queen (1941).

In 1946, he resigned as dramatic critic for the New York World Telegram after the paper refused to publish his harshly negative review of the Old Vic Company's production of Shakespeare's Henry IV Part I and Rascoe, in turn, refused to review any more Old Vic productions. One report of his resignation called him "the stormiest figure in Broadway circles".

He was also a literary critic (New York World Telegram) and was a syndicated columnist throughout his career. He was best known for "A Bookman's Daybook," "The Book of the Week," and "TV First-Nighter."

Rascoe married Hazel Luke on July 5, 1913, and they had two children, Alfred Burton Rascoe Jr., born July 2, 1914, who died by suicide in 1936, and a daughter, Ruth Helen, born 1918.

In his last few years of life, Rascoe worked as a television reviewer. He died of heart failure in New York City on March 19, 1957.
