= Kitty Shannon =

English artist and illustrator

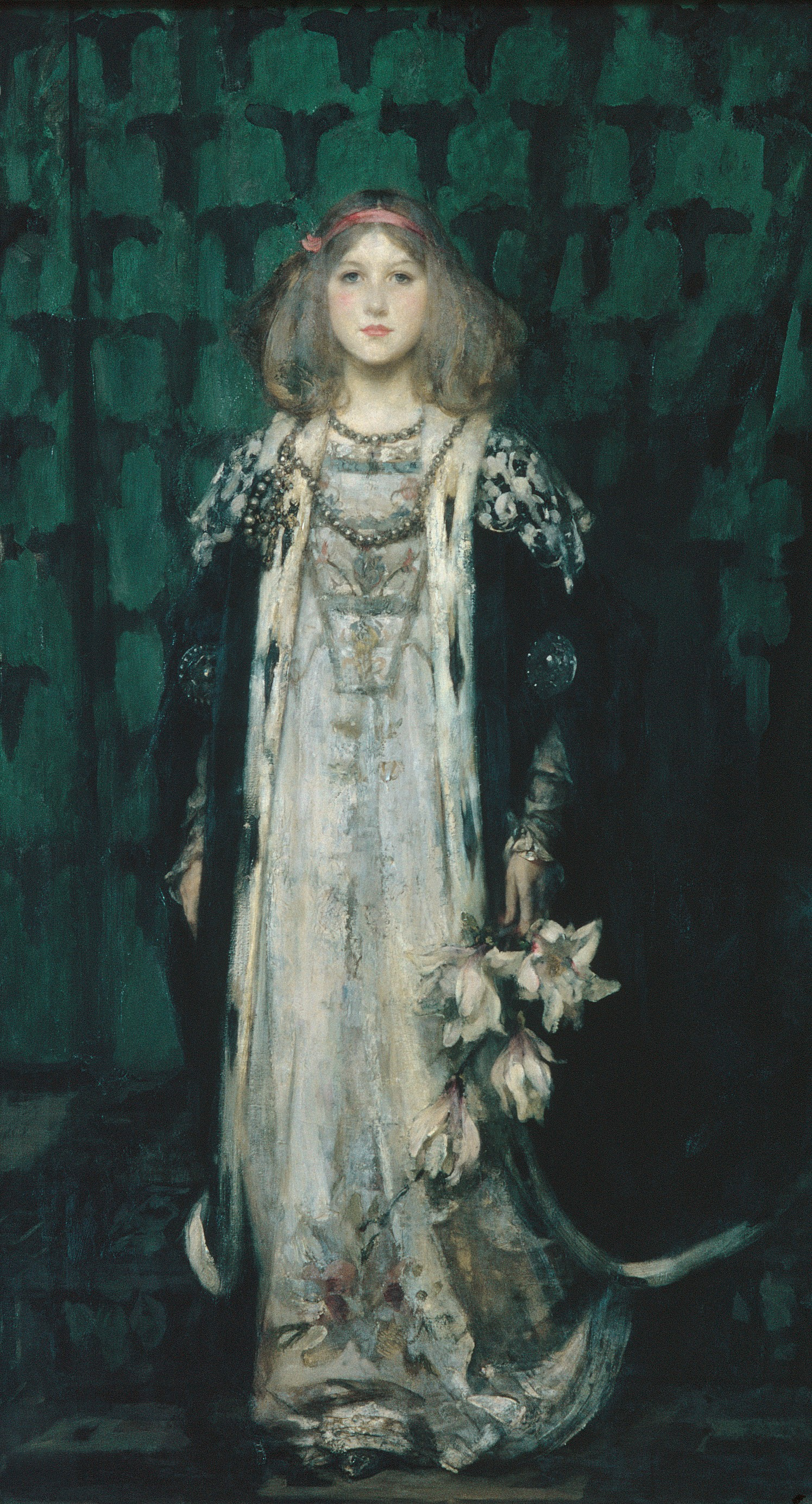
- Born: 3 February 1887
- Occupation: Illustrator

Katherine Marjorie "Kitty" Shannon (3 February 1887 – 24 November 1974), was an English artist and illustrator. Her father was the artist Sir James Jebusa Shannon, for whom she was a frequent sitter. In 1912, she married Walter Keigwin and they had two children.

== Works ==
Her work includes illustration for:

- The Devil on Two Sticks by Alain-René Lesage
- Nell Gwyn: The Story of Her Life by Lewis Melville
- Henry VIII and His Wives by Walter Jerrold (1926)
- Venus in Trousers, the fictionalised biography of George Sand (1938)
