= George Jean Nathan =

American drama critic and magazine editor (1882–1958)

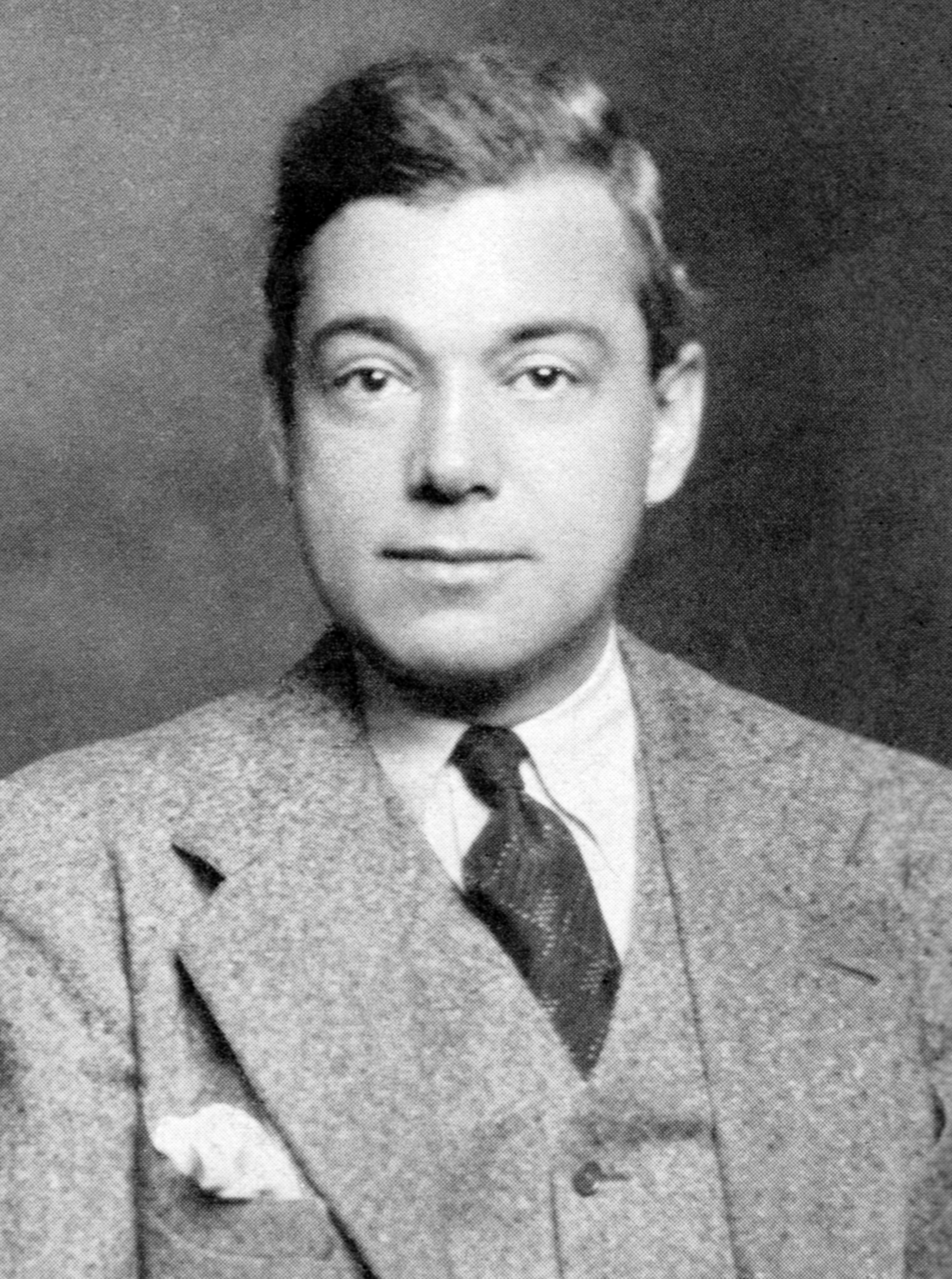
- Nathan in 1928
- Born: February 14, 1882; Fort Wayne, Indiana, U.S.
- Died: April 8, 1958 (aged 76); New York City, U.S.
- Education: Cornell University
- Occupations: Drama critic; magazine founder and editor
- Known for: Co-founder of The American Mercury and American Spectator
- Spouse: Julie Haydon

George Jean Nathan (February 14, 1882 – April 8, 1958) was an American drama critic and magazine editor. He worked closely as an editor with H. L. Mencken bringing the literary magazine The Smart Set to prominence and while co-founding and editing The American Mercury and The American Spectator.

== Early life and education ==
Nathan was born in Fort Wayne, Indiana, on February 14, 1882, the son of Ella (Nirdlinger) and Charles Naret Nathan. He was graduated from Cornell University in 1904. There, he was a member of the Quill and Dagger society and an editor of The Cornell Daily Sun.

== Career ==
Nathan wrote the plays The Artist (1912) and Heliogabalus (1920) with H. L. Mencken; he was sole author of The Eternal Mystery (1913) and The Avon Flows (1937). The Eternal Mystery premiered in 1913 at the Princess Theatre in Manhattan. Owen Hatteras referred to the play as a failure when he quipped that Nathan had "...forbidden the production of the play henceforth in any American city save Chicago, in which city anyone who chooses may perform it without payment of royalties." The Avon Flows is a conflation of three Shakespeare plays (Romeo and Juliet, The Taming of the Shrew, and Othello).

== Relationships and marriage ==
Nathan had a reputation as a "ladies' man" and the character of Addison De Witt, the waspish theater critic who squires a starlet (played by a then-unknown Marilyn Monroe) in the 1950 film All About Eve was based on Nathan.

Beginning in the late 1920s, Nathan had a romantic relationship with actress Lillian Gish that lasted almost a decade. Gish repeatedly refused his proposals of marriage.

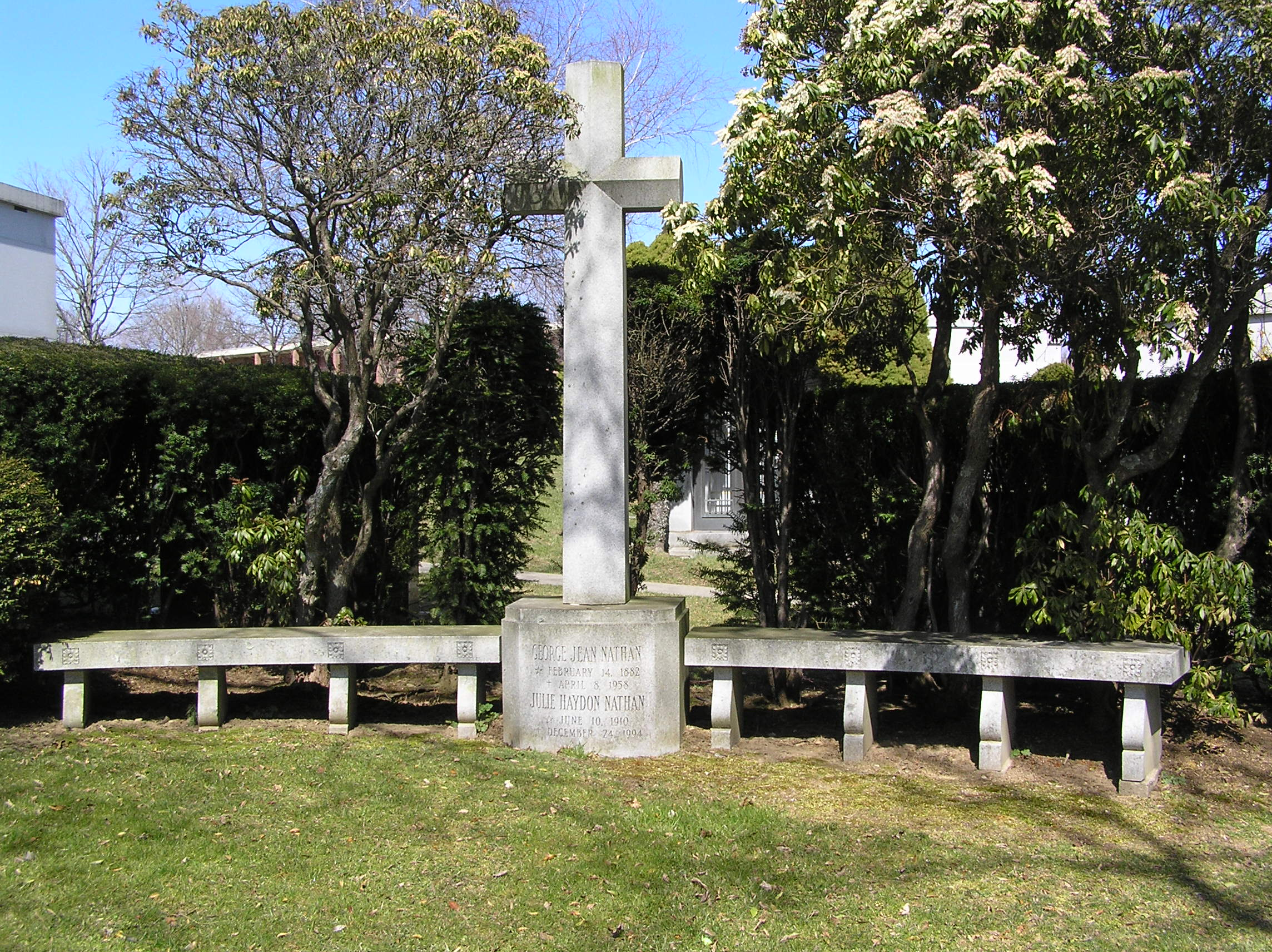
Hawthorne, New York burial site of both Julie Haden and George Jean Nathan

At age 73 in 1955, Nathan married Julie Haydon (1910–1994). She was a stage and film actress who debuted on Broadway in 1935.

== Death ==
Nathan died in Manhattan in 1958, aged 76. He and his wife are buried together in the Cemetery of the Gate of Heaven in Hawthorne, New York.

== Legacy ==
An honor in dramatic criticism, the George Jean Nathan Award, is named after him. Nathan was inducted into the American Theater Hall of Fame.

=== Papers ===
A collection of Nathan-Haydon papers was donated by Haydon to the La Crosse Public Library archives in La Crosse, Wisconsin, her residence at the time of her death. Separate from that collection of papers, Nathan bequeathed a collection of his letters and papers to Cornell University. Among the papers at Cornell are several letters he received from Eugene O'Neill.

== Non-fiction works ==
- Europe After 8:15 with H. L. Mencken and W. H. Wright (1914)
- Another Book on the Theatre (1915)
- Mr. George Jean Nathan Presents (1917)
- Bottoms Up, an Application of Slapstick to Satire (1917)
- The Popular Theater (1918)
- A Book Without a Title (1918)
- Comedian's All (1919)
- Heliogabalus, a Buffoonery in Three Acts With H. L. Mencken (1920)
- The American Credo; a Contribution Toward the Interpretation of the National Mind With H. L. Mencken (1921)
- The Theatre, The Drama, The Girls (1921)
- The Critic and The Drama (1922)
- The World in Falseface (1923)
- Materia Critic (1924)
- The Autobiography of an Attitude (1925)
- The House of Satan (1926)
- The New American Credo (1927)
- Land of the Pilgrim Pride (1927)
- Art of the Night (1928)
- Monks are Monks; a Diagnostic Scherzo (1929)
- Testament of a Critic (1931)
- Friends of Mine (1931)
- Intimate Notebooks (1932)
- Since Ibsen; a Statistical Historical Outline of the Popular Theatre Since 1900 (1933)
- Passing Judgements (1935)
- The Morning After the Night Before
- The Theatre of The Moment; a Journalistic Commentary (1936)
- Encyclopedia of the Theatre (1940)
- The Bachelor Life (1941)
- The Entertainment of a Nation; or, Three-Sheets in the Wind (1942, several editions)
- Beware of Parents; a Bachelor's Book for Children (1943)
- The Theatre Book of the Year, 1943-44
- The Theatre Book of the Year, 1944-45
- The Theatre Book of the Year, 1949-46
- The Theatre Book of the Year, 1946-47

== Secondary sources ==
- Isaac Goldberg: George Jean Nathan: A Critical Study (Girard, Kansas, Haldeman-Julius Company [c.1925])
- Seymour Rudin: George Jean Nathan: A Study of His Criticism ([Ithaca, N.Y.] 1953)
- Thomas F. Connolly: George Jean Nathan and the Making of Modern American Drama Criticism (Madison: Faileigh Dickinson University Press, c.2000)
