= 1894 in art =

The year 1894 in art involved some significant literary events.

== Events ==
- February – Oscar Wilde's play Salome is first published in English, with illustrations by Aubrey Beardsley.
- April – The Yellow Book (edited by Henry Harland with Aubrey Beardsley as art editor) begins publication by John Lane and Elkin Mathews – The Bodley Head in London.
- June 5 – Opening of Racławice Panorama in Lwów.
- August 23 – Jack Butler Yeats marries fellow artist Mary Cottenham White.
- The Della Robbia Pottery is established as part of the Arts and Crafts movement by Harold Rathbone and Conrad Dressler in Birkenhead, England.
- Lucien Pissarro sets up the Eragny Press in England.
- Bernard Berenson publishes The Venetian Painters of the Renaissance, with an Index to their Works.

== Works ==
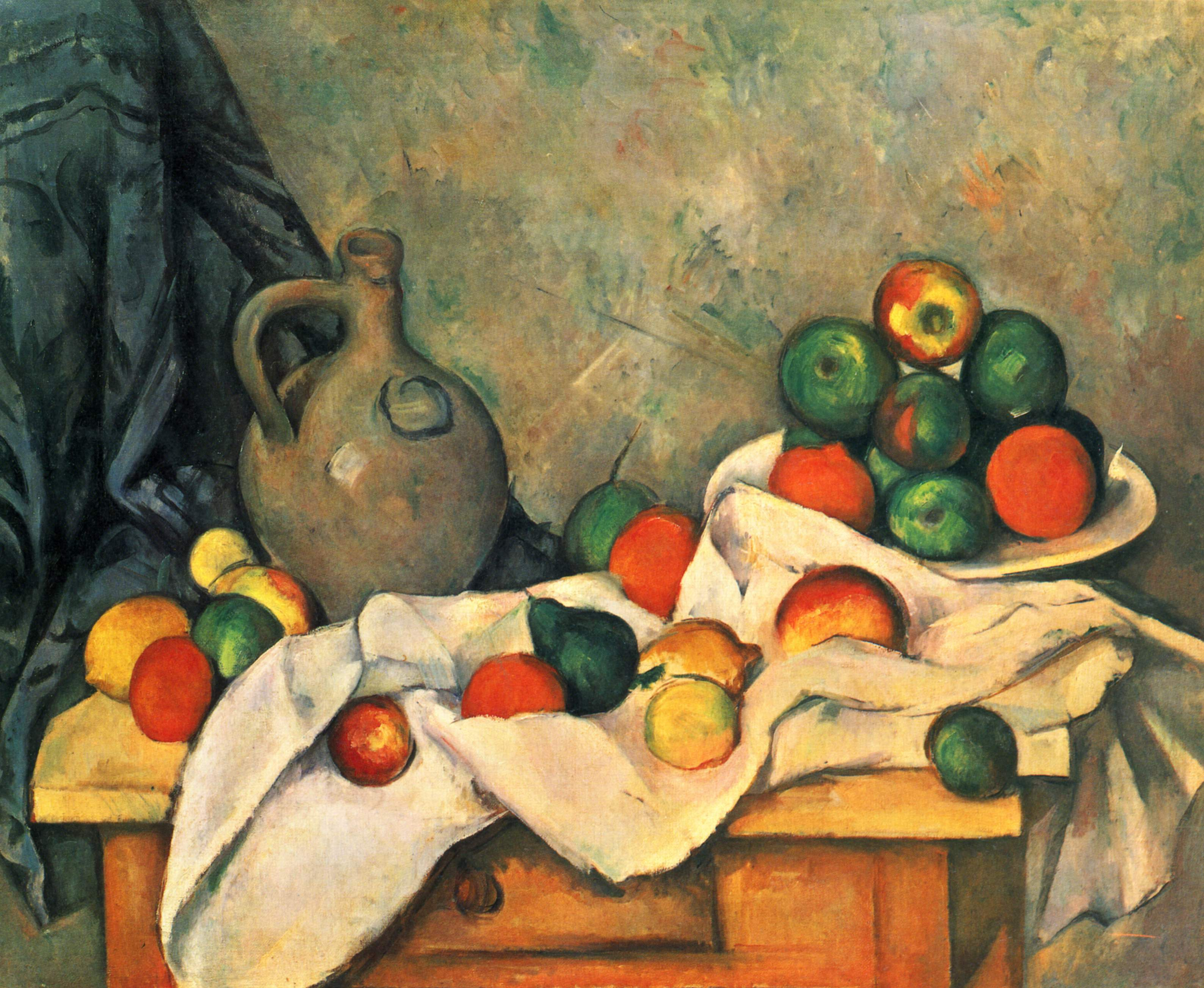
Cézanne – Rideau, Cruchon et Compotier

- Lawrence Alma-Tadema – Spring (Getty Museum, Los Angeles)
- Charles Burton Barber
  - Queen Victoria with John Brown
  - Suspense
- Aubrey Beardsley
  - Self-portrait in bed (line block print)
  - Illustrations to Oscar Wilde's Salome
- Olga Boznańska – Girl with Chrysanthemums
- Edward Burne-Jones
  - Love Among the Ruins (copy in oils)
  - (with John Henry Dearle and William Morris) – Holy Grail tapestries (original versions completed)
- Gustave Caillebotte – The garden of the Petit Gennevilliers in winter
- Gustaf Cederström – Among the Homeless
- Paul Cézanne –
  - ‘’Bathers’’
  - Rideau, Cruchon et Compotier
- Thomas Davidson – England's Pride and Glory
- Herbert Dicksee – Silent Sympathy
- Árpád Feszty – Arrival of the Hungarians (cyclorama)
- Paul Gauguin
  - Breton Peasants (Musée d'Orsay, Paris)
  - Oviri (ceramic sculpture, original cast in Musée d'Orsay)
  - ‘’The Siesta’’
- J. W. Godward – A Priestess
- Thomas Cooper Gotch – The Child Enthroned
- Arthur Hacker – The Temptation of Sir Percival
- Paja Jovanović – The Takovo Uprising
- Max Liebermann – Der Garten des Waisenhauses in Amsterdam
- Maximilien Luce – Port of London, Night
- Frederick William MacMonnies – Bacchante and Infant Faun (bronze, Metropolitan Museum of Art, New York City)
- Jacek Malczewski – Melancholia
- Henri Matisse – Woman Reading
- Claude Monet – Rouen Cathedral (The Portal, Morning Sun; Harmony in Blue) (Musée d'Orsay, Paris)
- Edvard Munch
  - Anxiety (Munch Museum, Oslo)
  - Puberty (National Gallery, Oslo)
  - Love and Pain (Vampire) (Gothenburg Museum of Art, Sweden)
- Ernest Normand – The White Slave
- Władysław Podkowiński – Ecstasy
- Edward Poynter – Barine
- Henrietta Rae – Psyche at the Throne of Venus
- Tom Roberts – The Golden Fleece
- Georges Rochegrosse – The Knight of the Flowers (Parsifal) (Musée d'Orsay, Paris)
- Aleksander Sochaczewski – Farewell Europe!
- Solomon Joseph Solomon – Mrs Patrick Campbell as Paula Tanqueray
- Marie Spartali Stillman
  - Love Sonnets
  - A Rose from Armida's Garden
- Henry Ossawa Tanner – The Thankful Poor
- James Tissot
  - The Adoration of the Shepherds
  - What Our Lord Saw from the Cross
- Henri de Toulouse-Lautrec – Woman Pulling Up Her Stocking (Musée d'Orsay, Paris)
- Ferdinand Freiherr von Miller – J. Marion Sims (bronze)
- Fritz von Uhde – Noli me tangere
- Theodoor Verstraete – Spring in Schoore (Zeeland)
- James McNeill Whistler – Portrait of Arthur Jerome Eddy
- Stanisław Wyspiański – Planty Park at Dawn

== Births ==
- 9 January – Reg Gammon, English painter and illustrator (died 1997)
- 3 February – Norman Rockwell, American painter and illustrator (died 1978)
- 8 March – Wäinö Aaltonen, Finnish sculptor (died 1966)
- 17 March – Meredith Frampton, English portrait painter (died 1984)
- 10 April – Ben Nicholson, English abstract painter (died 1982)
- 19 April – Adolf Wissel, German painter, an official artist of Nazism (died 1973)
- 22 April – Evie Hone, Irish painter and stained glass artist (died 1955)
- 27 April – George Petty, American pin-up artist (died 1975)
- 17 May – Zora Petrović, one of the most significant representatives of Expressionism of color in Serbian art between two wars (died 1962)
- 6 June – Arthur Szyk, Polish-born illustrator and political artist (died 1951)
- 13 June – Jacques Henri Lartigue, French photographer and painter (died 1986)
- 28 June – Ronald Ossory Dunlop, Irish author and painter (died 1973)
- 2 July – André Kertész, Hungarian-born photographer (died 1985)
- 14 July – Dave Fleischer, Austrian-American animator, film director, and film producer (died 1979)
- 26 August – Gala Dalí, model and wife of Salvador Dalí (died 1982)
- 3 September – André Hébuterne, French painter (died 1992)
- 7 October – Doris Huestis Speirs, Canadian painter, ornithologist and poet (died 1989)
- 8 October – Risto Stijović, Serbian sculptor (died 1974)
- 14 October – E. E. Cummings, American poet and painter (died 1962)
- 4 November – Chafik Charobim, Egyptian painter (died 1975)
- 8 December – James Thurber, American cartoonist (died 1961)
- 27 December – Annot, German painter (died 1981)
- date unknown
  - Bror Hjorth, Swedish sculptor and painter (died 1968)
  - Ovartaci, born Louis Marcussen, Danish outsider artist (died 1985)

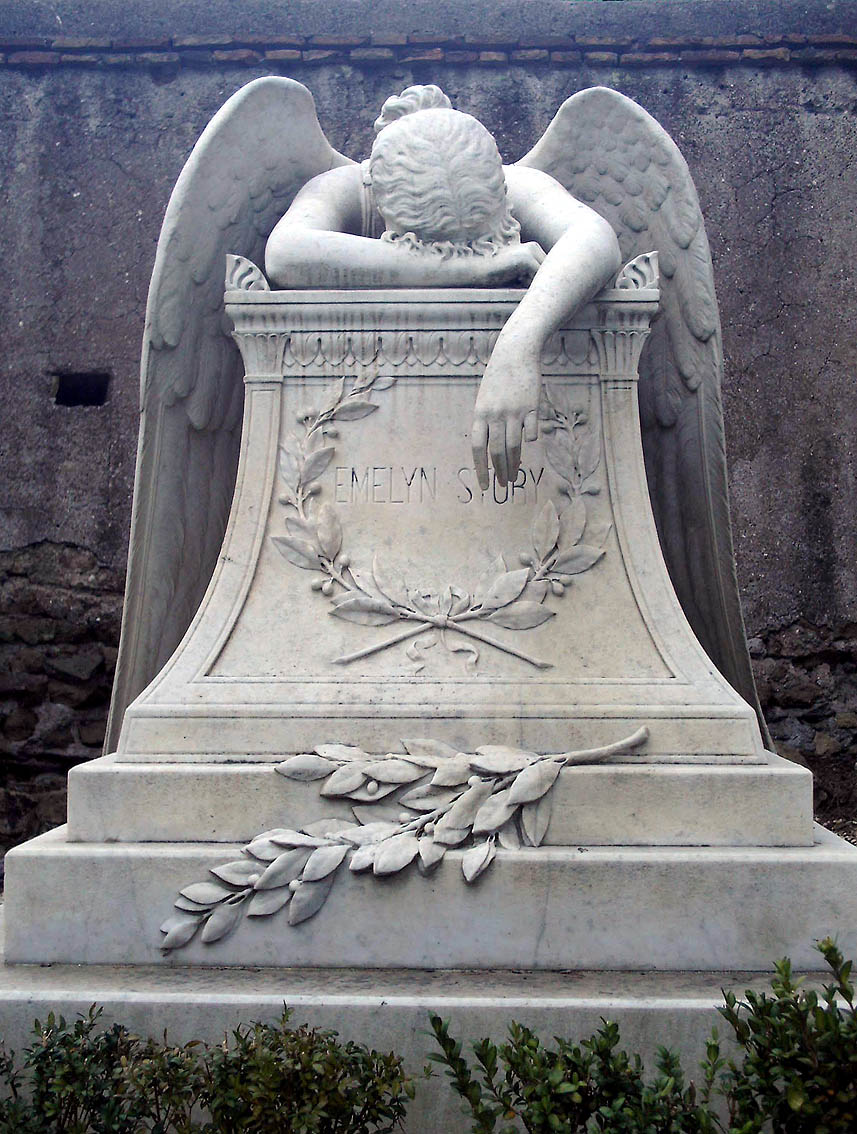
W.W. Story – Angel of Grief (1894)

== Deaths ==
- January 3 – Gustav Fabergé, German jeweler (born 1814)
- January 10 – Carl Werner, German watercolour painter (born 1808)
- January 29 – Armand Gautier, French painter (born 1825)
- February 13 – Georg Decker, Austro-Hungarian portrait painter (born 1818)
- February 21 – Gustave Caillebotte, French painter and arts patron (born 1848)
- April 12 – Lucy Madox Brown, English painter (born 1843)
- April 27 – Charles Laval, French painter (born 1862)
- June 17 – William Hart, Scottish American landscape painter (born 1823)
- July 1 – Jean-Joseph Carriès, French sculptor and ceramicist (born 1850)
- July 25 – Per Hasselberg, Swedish sculptor (born 1850)
- August 5 – Giovanni Muzzioli, Italian painter (born 1854)
- August 30 – Joseph Robinson Kirk, Irish sculptor (born 1821)
- September 26 – Launt Thompson, Irish sculptor (born 1833)
- date unknown – Charles Burton Barber, English genre painter (born 1845)
