= Arthur Hacker (illustrator) =

Hong Kong illustrator and historian

- 許敬雅
- Born: June 1, 1932; Salisbury, Wiltshire, England, British Empire
- Died: October 9, 2013 (aged 81); Hong Kong
- Occupations: Illustrator, painter, historian

Arthur Hacker (June 1, 1932 - October 9, 2013) was a Hong Kong illustrator, painter and historian from the United Kingdom who served in the Hong Kong government from 1967 to 1989.

== Biography ==
Hacker was born in Salisbury, Wiltshire, England on June 1, 1932. His parents were Brigadier Edward Sidney Hacker (1887–1955) and Carla Lanyon Lanyon Hacker (1906–1971), a poet, novelist and painter. Hacker's great-grandfather Edward Hacker (1812–1905) was a line etching artist, and his great-granduncle Arthur Hacker (1858–1919) was a graduate of the Royal Academy of Art.

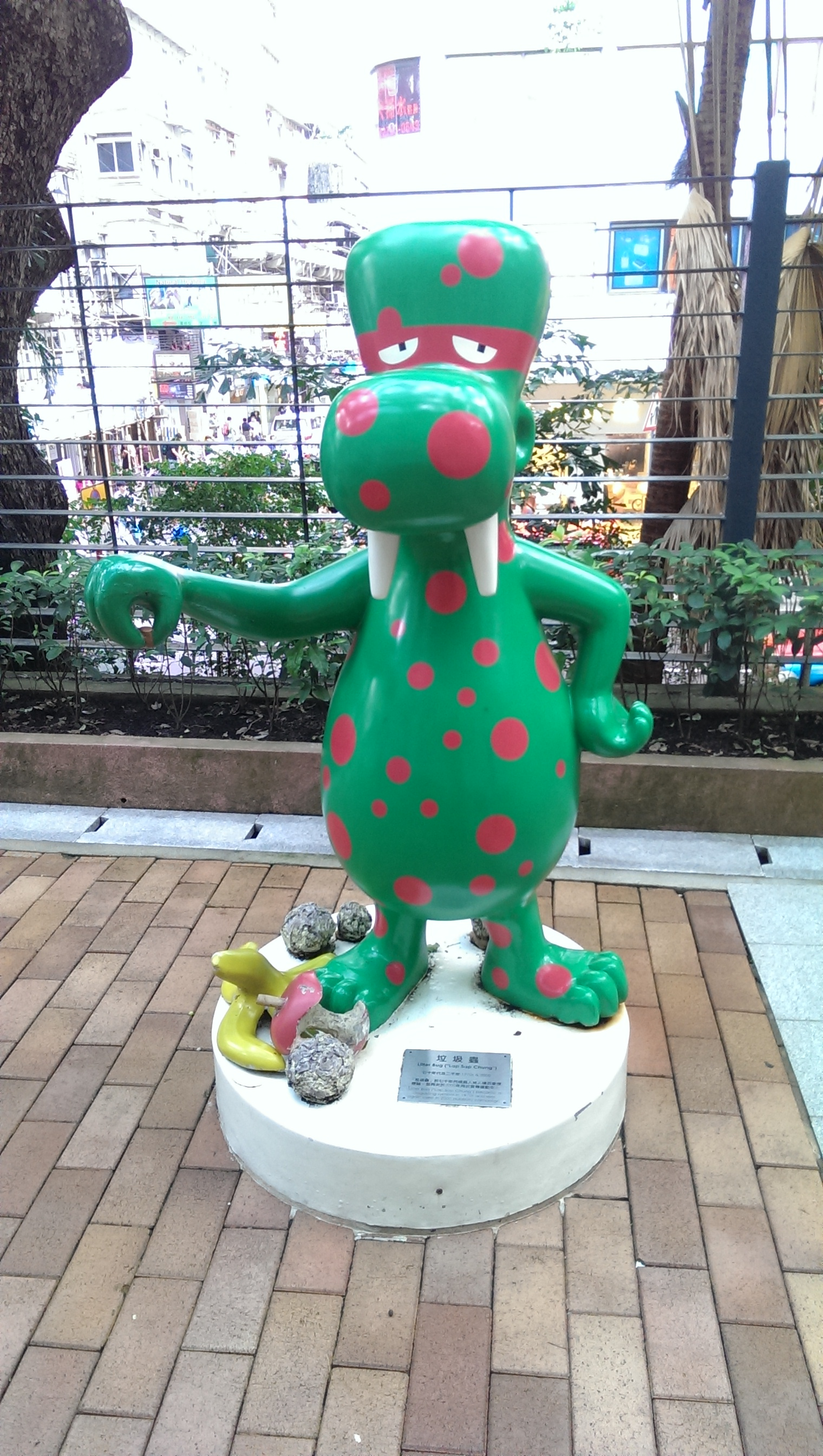
"Garbage Bug" designed by Xu Jingya

In 1967, Hacker was hired by the Hong Kong government to come to Hong Kong in the same year to serve as artistic director of the Government Information Service. He was subsequently promoted to creative director in 1974 and retired from the Hong Kong government in 1989 with the rank of Chief Information Officer. During his tenure, he also served as a member of the Stamp Advisory Committee. He designed posters, stamps, publications, advertisements and exhibition layouts, etc. Among the more well-known ones are the fourth and fifth sets of stamps issued by Queen Elizabeth II in 1973 and 1982 respectively, and the then Hong Kong Governor MacLehose. The Fight Crime campaign launched by Sir Alex (later Lord) in 1973 designed a "broken dagger " as one of the symbols of the campaign.

== Works ==
- Hong Kong: A Rare Photographic Record of the 1860s. Hong Kong: Wattis Fine Art, 1997. ISBN 978-9-62851-591-2（直譯：《香港：罕有的1860年代相片紀錄》。香港：華蒂斯藝術，1997年。）
- Arthur Hacker's Wanchai. Hong Kong: Odyssey, 1997. ISBN 978-9-62217-465-8（直譯：《許敬雅的灣仔》。香港：奧德賽出版社，1997年。）
- China Illustrated: western views of the middle kingdom. Boston: Tuttle, 2004. ISBN 978-0-80483-519-0（直譯：《圖說中國：西方眼中的中土王國》。波士頓：圖托，2004年。）
