= A Wet Night at Piccadilly Circus =

Painting by Arthur Hacker

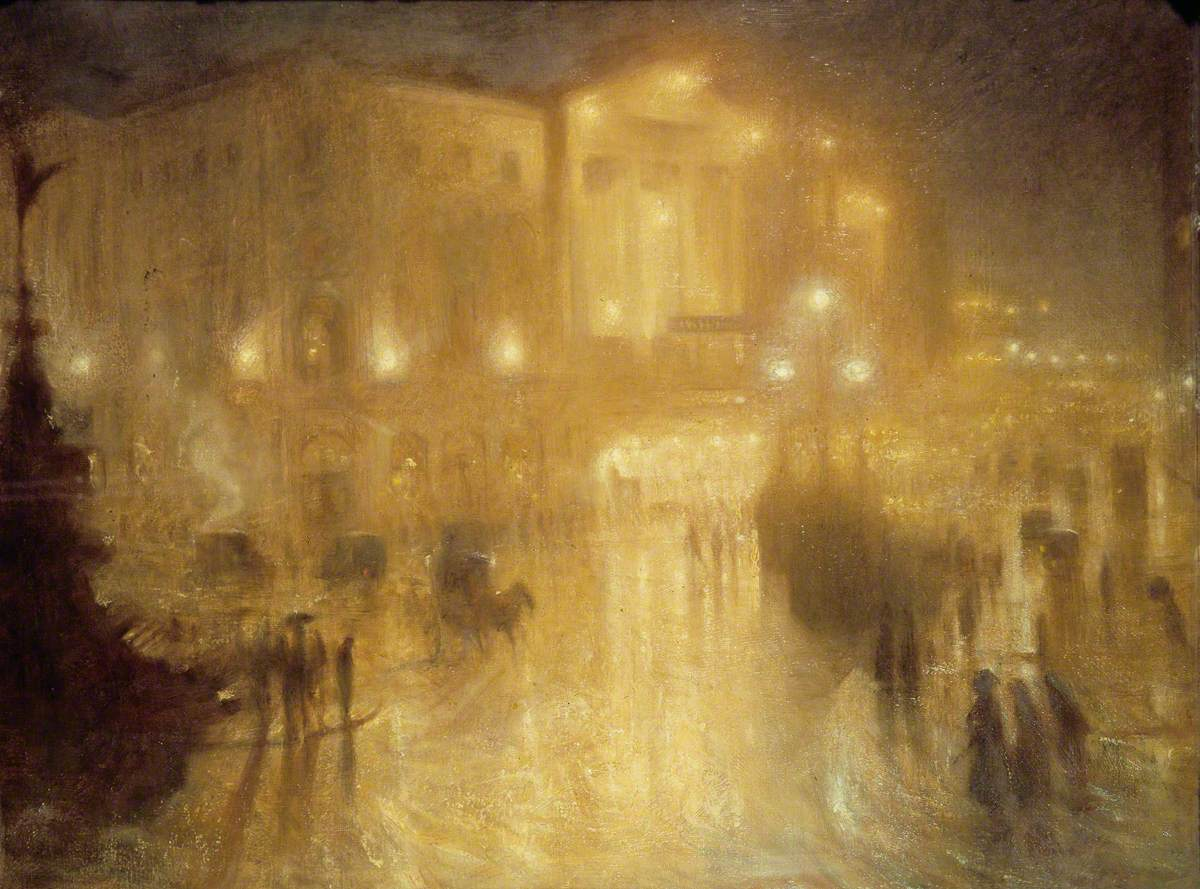
- Artist: Arthur Hacker
- Year: 1910
- Type: Oil on canvas, landscape painting
- Dimensions: 71 cm × 91.5 cm (28 in × 36.0 in)
- Location: Royal Academy of Arts, London

A Wet Night at Piccadilly Circus is a 1910 oil painting by the British artist Arthur Hacker. A cityscape, it depicts a view of Piccadilly Circus in Central London. The rainy evening atmosphere of Edwardian era London is captured by a brightly illuminated yellow mist alongside the pedestrians and carriages.

When Hacker was elected to full membership of the Royal Academy of Arts the same year he was required to submit a diploma work and he presented this. He displayed the painting at the Royal Academy Exhibition of 1911 held at Burlington House.

== Bibliography ==
- Ackroyd, Peter. Colours of London: A History. Frances Lincoln, 2022.
- McConkey, Kenneth (ed.) Impressionism in Britain. Yale University Press, 1995.
