= The Siesta (Paul Gauguin) =

Painting by Paul Gauguin

- Artist: Paul Gauguin
- Year: c. 1892-1894
- Type: Oil on canvas
- Dimensions: 88.9 cm × 116.2 cm (35.0 in × 45.7 in)
- Location: Metropolitan Museum of Art, New York City

The Siesta is an 1892-1894 oil on canvas painting by Paul Gauguin, now in the Metropolitan Museum of Art in New York. It was painted during Gauguin's first extended trip to the island of Tahiti.

The picture is an unpretentious representation of a group of Tahitian women in westernised clothes chatting in the cool shade of a verandah during the hot afternoon sun. One of the women is doing her ironing. Although the subject matter was an aspect of everyday life, Gauguin worked on the canvas over a long period, making several changes - the shopping bag in the foreground, for example, was previously a dog.
