= Spring (Alma-Tadema painting) =

1894 painting by Lawrence Alma-Tadema

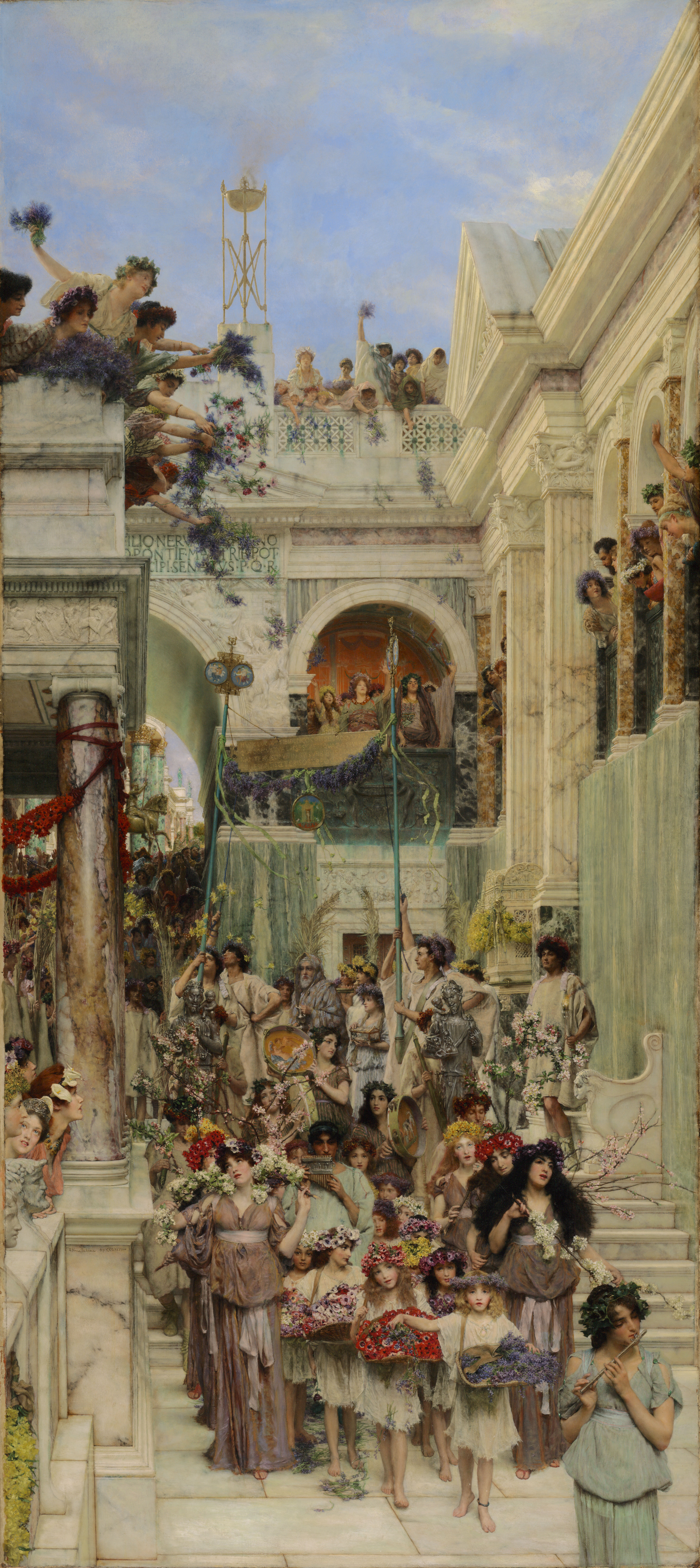
- Artist: Lawrence Alma-Tadema
- Year: 1894
- Medium: oil on canvas
- Dimensions: 178.4 cm × 80.3 cm (70.2 in × 31.6 in)
- Location: J. Paul Getty Museum, Los Angeles

Spring is an 1894 oil-on-canvas painting by the Anglo-Dutch artist Lawrence Alma-Tadema, which has been in the collection of the J. Paul Getty Museum in Los Angeles, California, since 1972. The painting relates the Victorian custom of children collecting flowers on May Day back to an Ancient Roman spring festival, perhaps Cerealia or Floralia or Ambarvalia, although the details depicted in the painting do not correspond to any single Roman festival. It was the inspiration for the scene of Julius Caesar's triumphal entry into Rome in the 1934 film Cleopatra.

== Description ==
The tall, narrow painting depicts a procession of women and children along a Roman street and down some marble steps. Spectators cheer from the classical buildings of polychrome marble to either side, some throwing down flowers. The participants in the procession are garlanded with bright flowers, with some also bearing baskets of flowers or branches of blossom, and other playing musical instruments: a flute, pan pipes, and tambourines. The choice of flowers in the painting seems to be driven more by aesthetic and colour considerations than the symbolic meanings of the Victorian language of flowers.

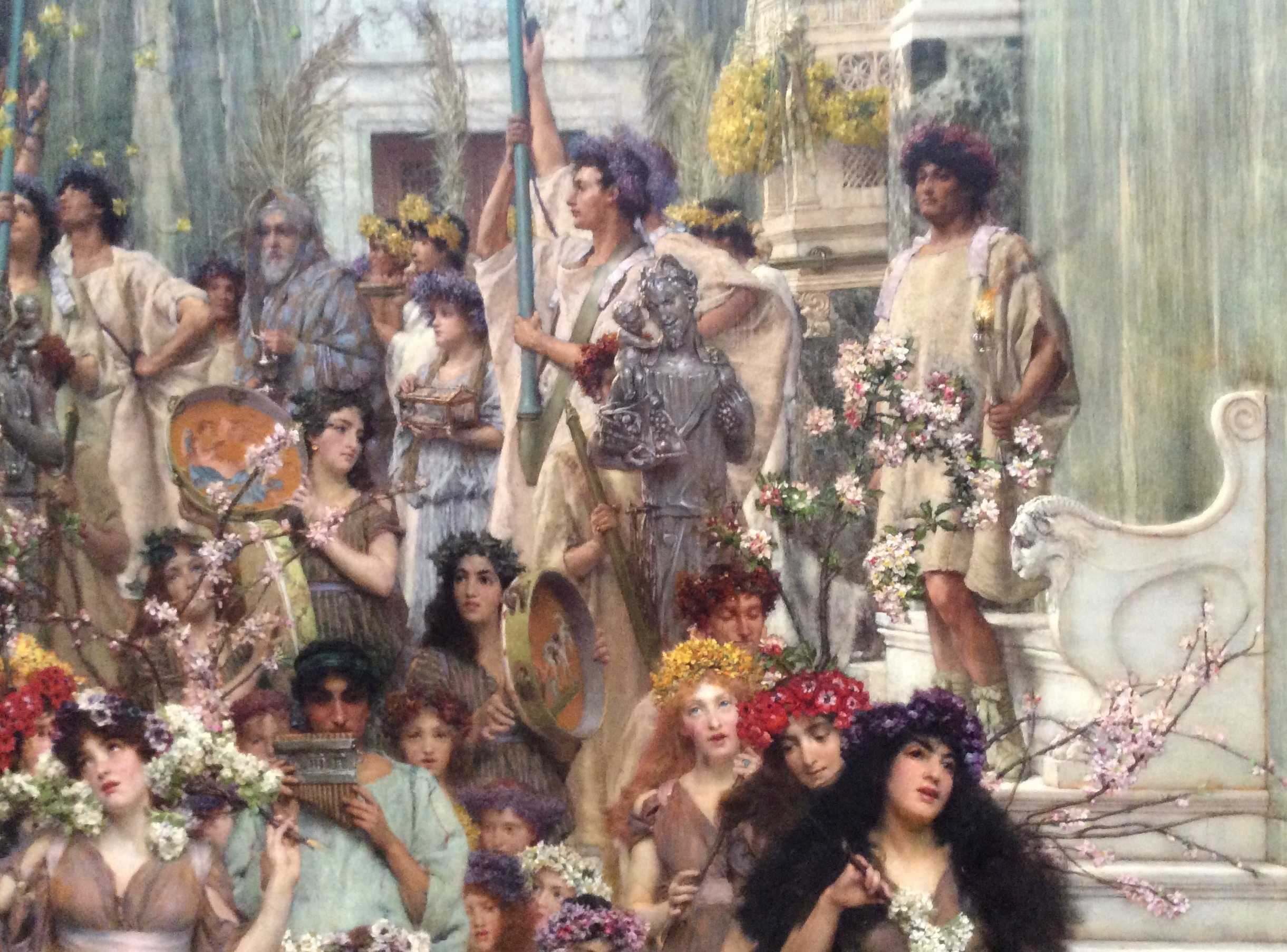
Detail of musicians and procession

Towards the rear of the procession is a bearded priest holding a metal jug, with other attendants carrying a casket, a torch, and a large portable ivory altar which is emerging from the building to the right. Other attendants bear two silver sculptures of a horned satyr with a child and fruit, and two more hold poles with a banner slung between, bearing a Latin fragment (then attributed to Catullus, known as Carmina Catulli 8): "Hunc lucum tibi dedico consecroque, Priape / qua domus tua Lampsacist quaque silva, Priape/ nam te praecipue in suis urbibus colit ora / Hellespontia ceteris ostreosior oris" (loosely translated: "This enclosure I dedicate and consecrate to thee, Priapus / At Lampsacus where is thy home and sacred grove, Priapus / For thee specially in its coastal cities are you worshipped / Of Hellespont more abundant in oysters than all other coasts").

Many of the participants and spectators were modelled by Alma-Tadema's friends or members of his family. They include the bearded composer George Henschel and his daughter Helen, high on a balcony to the right. A bearded bust to the lower left may be a self-portrait of Alma-Tadema, beside the base of a column where the painting is signed and numbered: " L Alma Tadema Op CCCXXVI".

The surrounding scene is an architectural capriccio, not a single known location but rather combining parts of known Roman buildings from several different locations=. To the left rear is a triumphal arch, with an inscription taken from the Arch of Trajan at Benevento, 130 mi (210 km) southeast of Rome; its spandrel is decorated with a river god based on the Arch of Constantine, but unusually accompanied by a sheep and bull (for Aries and Taurus, denoting April and May). A building to the left has a frieze showing the battle of Lapiths and Centaurs. Visible to the rear are two bronze equestrian statues, based on marble statues from Pompeii.

The painting measures 178.4 cm × 80.3 cm (70.2 in × 31.6 in) and retains its original, heavy gilded architectural frame, also designed by the artist, with pilasters and a triangular pediment. The frame above the painting displays its title, "Spring", and the bottom of the frame has four lines of poetry from Algernon Charles Swinburne's 1865 poem "Dedication" written in honour of the painter Edward Burne-Jones: "In a land of clear colours and stories, / In a region of shadowless hours, / Where earth has a garment of glories / And a murmur of musical flowers".

== Reception ==
Alma-Tadema worked on the painting for four years. It was completed in late 1894, and bought by the German banker Robert von Mendelssohn. It was exhibited at the 1895 Royal Academy Summer Exhibition, at the 1899 Große Berliner Kunstausstellung in Berlin, and at the 1900 Exposition Universelle in Paris. It was a commercial success for Alma-Tadema, who sold many reproductions.

The original painting was sold through Thomas Agnew & Sons in London, and acquired by Charles Yerkes in 1901. After his death in 1910, it was sold at the American Art Association, and then bought in 1912 from the dealer Henry Reinhardt Galleries in Chicago by Thomas F. Cole. It was exhibited at the inaugural exhibition at the new building of the Toledo Museum of Art in 1912, and later acquired by Edwin H. Fricke. It was the inspiration for the scene of Julius Caesar's triumphal entry into Rome in Cecil B. DeMille's 1934 film Cleopatra.

Along with other works from Fricke's collection, including Alma-Tadema's 1906 painting Ask Me No More, it was sold at Parke-Bernet in New York in 1945. It was acquired through Lewis A. Stone by Mrs. Edward Lane, and sold the same year to Hulett C. Merritt, in Pasadena. It was bought from his estate sale at Ames Art Galleries in 1956 by Victor Emmanuel Wenzel von Metternich, and acquired from his estate sale at Sotheby's in Los Angeles in 1972 by the J. Paul Getty Museum.
