= Annot (artist) =

German painter (1894-1981)

"Annot" (Annot Jacobi)
- Born: Anna Ottilie Krigar-Menzel; December 27, 1894; Berlin, Germany
- Died: October 20, 1981 (aged 86); Munich, Germany
- Known for: Painting, Pacifism

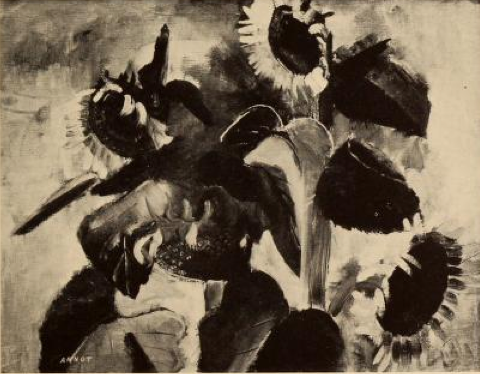
Black and white photograph of Sunflowers, 1929, by Annot

Annot (née Anna Ottilie Krigar-Menzel; December 27, 1894 – October 20, 1981), also known after her marriage as Annot Jacobi, was a German painter, art teacher, art writer and pacifist. As a result of political hostility in Germany, she spent much of her life in the United States and Puerto Rico.

== Early life ==
Annot was born on December 27, 1894, in Berlin as Anna Ottilie Krigar-Menzel, to Otto Krigar-Menzel and Jacoba Elling. She came from an upper-class family of academics. Her father was a professor of theoretical physics at the university in Berlin and her mother a professional singer. Her godparents included the composer Johannes Brahms and the painter Adolph Menzel, who was also her great-uncle.

== Education ==
Annot's early artistic training occurred at the Drawing and Painting School of the Verein der Berliner Künstlerinnen, an association of artists and their supporters in Berlin. She studied with Fritz Rhein and Karl Bennewitz von Loefen der Jüngere. In 1915, Annot studied at the painting school of Lovis Corinth. Annot was part of the Berlin Succession, an avant-garde artists group that reportedly admitted only one or two women. She signed her works "Annot".

== Painting and pacifism ==
In 1916, in protest against World War I she distributed self-written pacifist memoranda, and was sentenced to jail for 30 days. Siebrecht considers her position as exceptional. During 1916 to 1920, Annot lived in Oslo, Norway, where she continued to advocate for peace. In 1920 she returned to Berlin, where she worked in the Deutsche Liga für Menschenrechte (German League for Human Rights) as well as its predecessor organization Bund Neues Vaterland and the Women's International League for Peace and Freedom. She was a friend of Annette Kolb and Carl von Ossietzky.

In 1921 she married the painter Rudolf Jacobi. They had two children, and lived from 1923 to 1926 in Positano. From 1926 to 1928 Annot went to Paris to study with the painter André Lhote. In 1928, she and her husband opened a painting school, Malschule Annot, in Berlin. They also had a joint exhibition at Galerie Neumann-Nierendorf. Several of Annot's paintings were purchased for the National Gallery in Berlin. In 1933 the Jacobis were forced to close their school on the orders of the Nazis, because they refused to dismiss their Jewish pupils. Her paintings were designated in Nazi Germany as "degenerate" and destroyed or stolen.

Annot then emigrated with her husband to the United States, opening the Annot Art School and Gallery at Rockefeller Center. At the gallery, she showed the works of artists such as Katherine S. Dreier. During the 1930s and 1940s they lived in New York, spending summers in Gloucester, Massachusetts. Annot won numerous awards, including a gold medal for her picture of Käthe Kruse and her children, in an exhibition in New York City in 1935. Annot also supported herself and her family by working as an interior designer.

She and her husband continued to be active in the peace movement, even after the United States entered World War II in 1942. Annot became a Quaker in 1941. In 1945 Annot became Chairman of the Subcommittee on Food Parcels for Europe, established to send food parcels and letters to addresses submitted by the American Friends Service Committee, including German Friends. She, her husband, and their daughter Stella are all identified as members of the Westbury Monthly Meeting in a review of an art exhibit in 1958. They are mentioned as members of the Matinecock, N.Y., Preparative Meeting in 1959.

In 1956 Annot and her husband travelled to Puerto Rico where they visited Pablo Casals. They were particularly attracted by "the racial integration making itself felt there in all conditions of life". Annot was active in campaigning for nuclear disarmament, helping to form the Puerto Rican Committee for a Sane Nuclear Policy, of which she was appointed an honorary chairman. Pablo Casals and Albert Schweitzer were also honorary chairmen. Annot and Jacobi lived primarily in Puerto Rico until 1967 when they returned to Germany and settled in Munich.

== Artistic works ==
Annot was stylistically influenced by French Impressionism. From 1928 to 1930 she concentrated on a painting cycle in which she portrayed the faces of working women. Annot's work at this time is characterized by a loose generous surface treatment. This cycle of paintings includes a woman surgeon, a lawyer and a physiotherapist, and has been praised by Annelie Lütgens.

In February 1935, Annot held her first solo exhibition in the United States, at the Marie Sterner Gallery, New York. Her paintings and gouaches were positively reviewed. She also mounted an exhibition at the Katharine Kuh Gallery in Chicago in October 1936.

Her quality is essentially Teutonic, in her portraits, for example, there is a suggestion of the powerful realism that tends to overstatement, so characteristic of the modern German school, but which, in her case, is counterbalanced by a strong decorative quality and distinguished color sense.

In 1977, a comprehensive exhibition of Annot's works appeared at the Haus am Lützowplatz in Berlin. In 1978, her work was featured in the Galerie von Abercron in Munich.

== Later life ==
Rudolf Jacobi, Annot's spouse, died in 1972. Annot died on October 20, 1981, in Munich, Germany.

== See also ==
- List of German women artists
- List of German painters
- List of peace activists
