= Breton Peasant Women =

Painting by Paul Gauguin

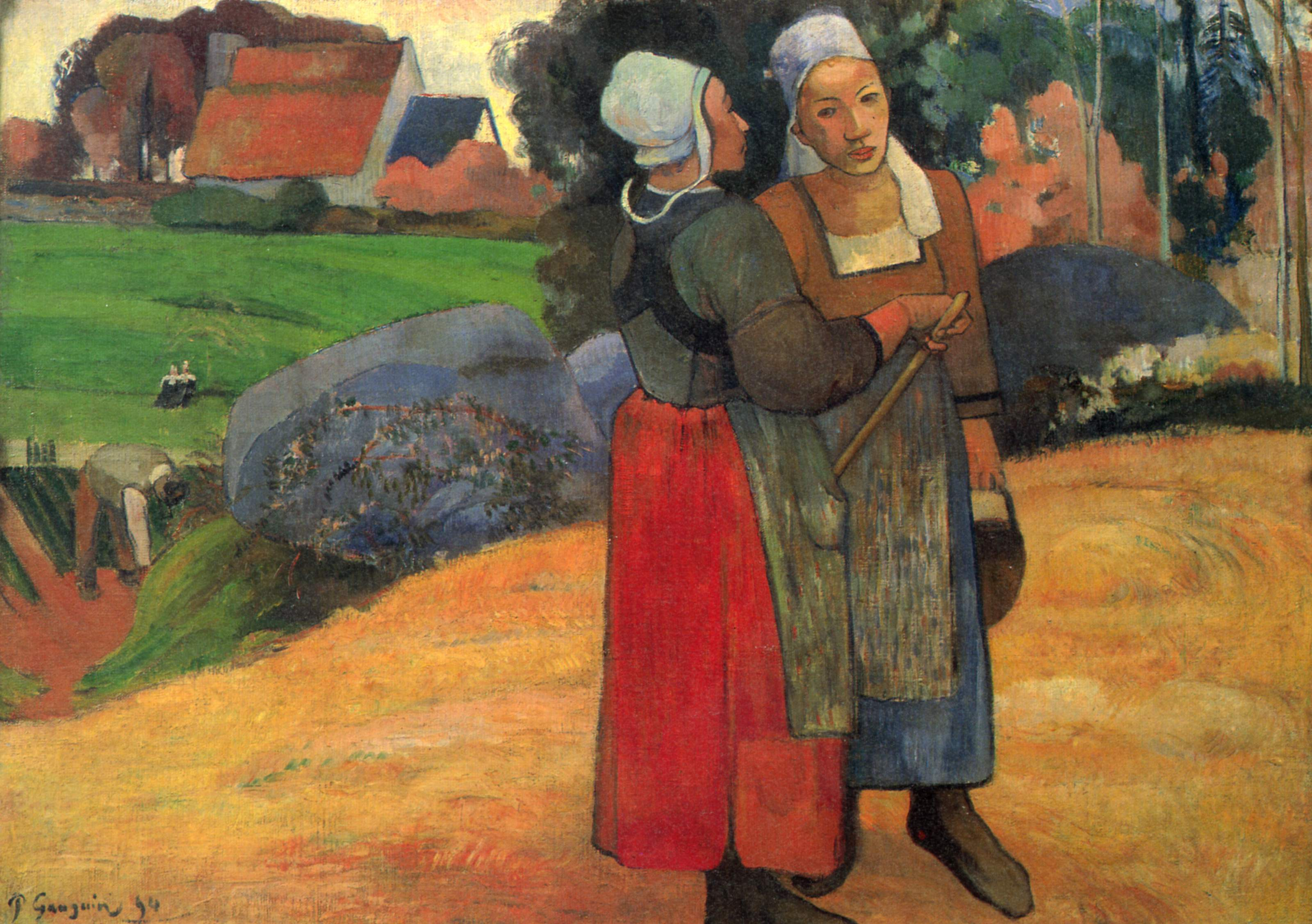
- Artist: Paul Gauguin
- Year: 1894
- Medium: oil on canvas
- Dimensions: 66.5 cm × 92.7 cm (26.2 in × 36.5 in)
- Location: Musée d'Orsay, Paris

Breton Peasant Women is an 1894 oil on canvas painting by Paul Gauguin of two Breton peasant women in conversation. It is now in the Musée d'Orsay in Paris.
