= Olga Boznańska =

Polish artist (1865–1940)

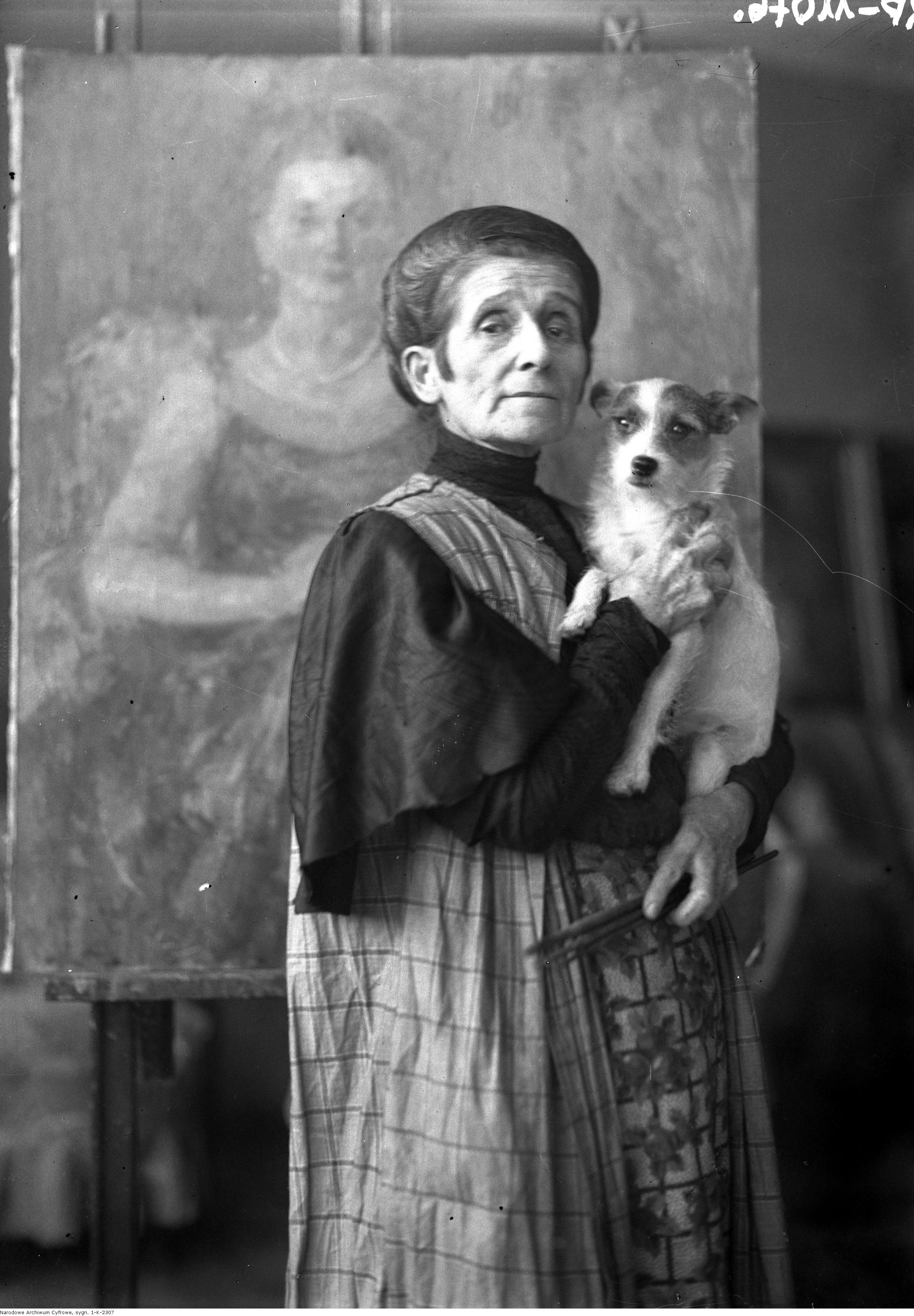
- Olga Boznańska, 1930
- Born: 15 April 1865; Kraków, Austrian Empire
- Died: 26 October 1940 (aged 75); Paris, German-occupied France
- Known for: Painter
- Notable work: Girl with Chrysanthemums (1894); Breton Woman (1889)

Olga Boznańska (15 April 1865 – 26 October 1940) was a Polish painter who was stylistically associated with the French impressionism, though she rejected this label.

== Early life ==
Boznańska was born in Kraków during foreign partitions of Poland. She was the daughter of Adam Nowina Boznański, (from a noble Polish family but influenced by positivism to take up work as a railway engineer) and teacher Eugénie née Mondan originally from Valence, France.

== Education and artistic training ==
Boznańska learned drawing first from her mother who was a teacher in the convent school of Premonstratensians in Imbramowice near Kraków, then with Józef Siedlecki, Kazimierz Pochwalski and Antoni Piotrowski between 1883-6. She then studied at the Adrian Baraniecki School for Women. She débuted in 1886 at the Kraków Association of Friends of Fine Arts exhibition.

From 1886 to 1890 she studied art in the private schools of Karl Kricheldorf and Wilhelm Dürr in Munich - as women were not yet permitted at the Munich Academy.

== Career ==
From then on she devoted herself mostly to portraits, still lifes and occasionally landscapes. She became well connected within the Polish artistic community of Munich, notably Józef Brandt who became her mentor. Her 1893 Portrait of Paul Nauen obtained her first public success – being awarded the gold medal at the International Exhibition in Vienna the following year.

In 1898, she joined the Society of Polish Artists "Sztuka" and in the same year moved to Paris, where she became a member of the Société Nationale des Beaux-Arts and started teaching at the Académie de la Grande Chaumière and joined the Polish Society of Literature and Art (Polskie Towarzystwo Literacko-Artystyczne).

Her most famous 1894 portrait of an unknown child Girl with Chrysanthemums fascinated her contemporaries by its symbolist atmosphere and psychological insight. Boznańska received the French Legion of Honour in 1912, the Golden Laurel of the Polish Academy of Literature in 1936, the Grand Prix at the Exposition Internationale des Arts et Techniques la Vie Moderne in 1937, and the Order of Polonia Restituta in 1938. The same year, at the Venice Biennale, one of her portraits was purchased by King of Italy Victor Emmanuel III. Her paintings can be found in the National Museums in Wrocław, Kraków, Poznań and Warsaw as well as Musée d'Orsay in Paris and Ca' Pesaro – International Gallery of Modern Art in Venice.

She died in Paris at the age of 75.

== Gallery ==
Selected works
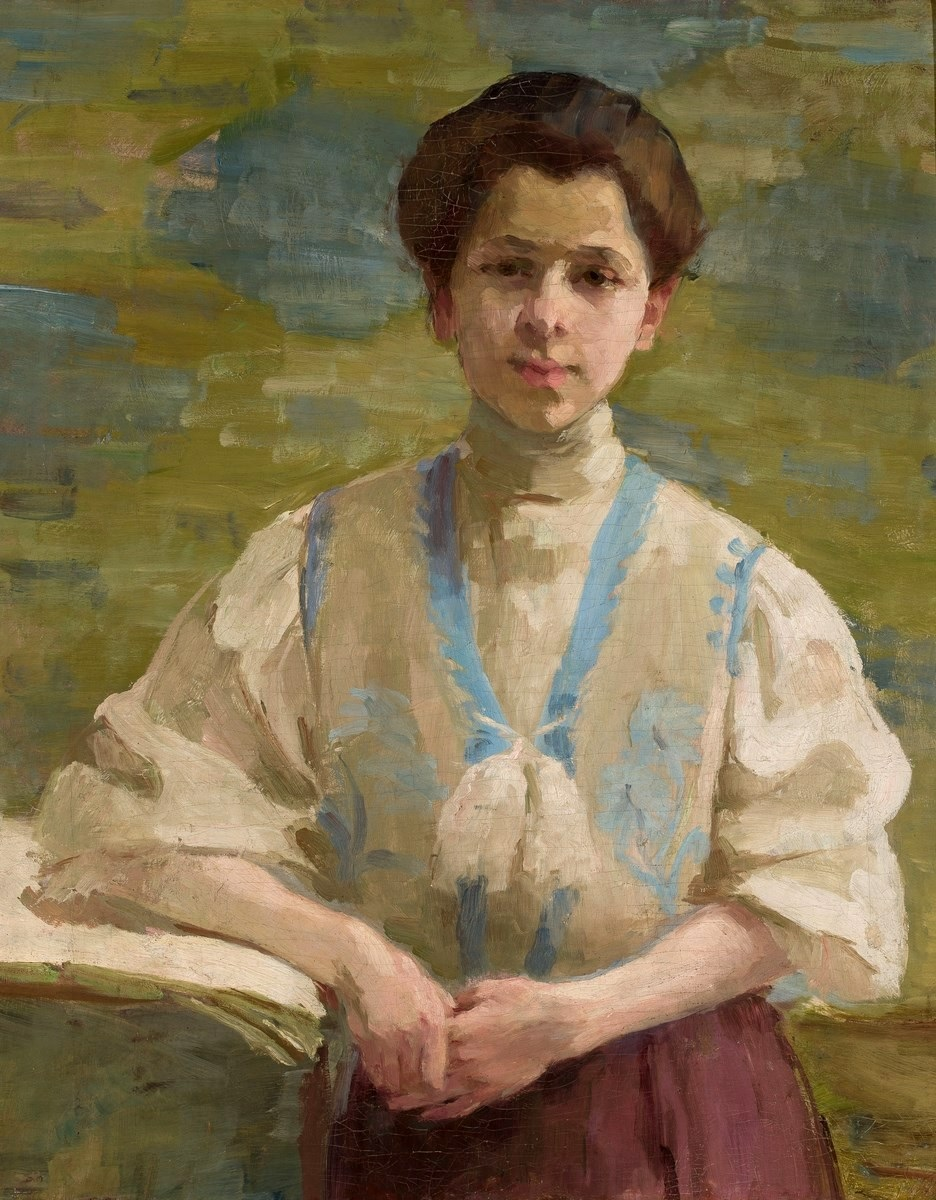
Self-portrait, 1893, National Museum in Warsaw

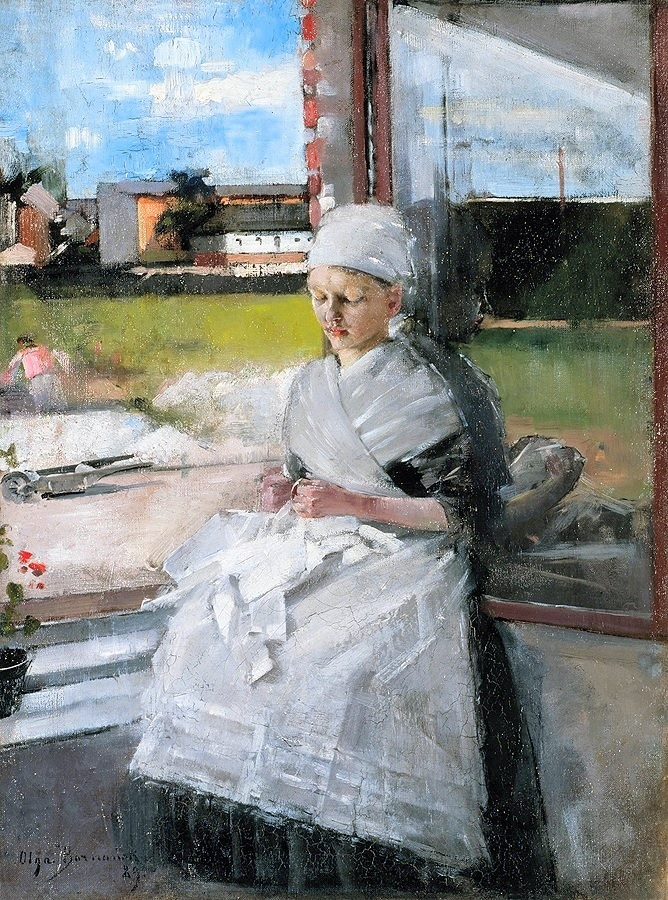
Breton Woman, 1889, Private collection

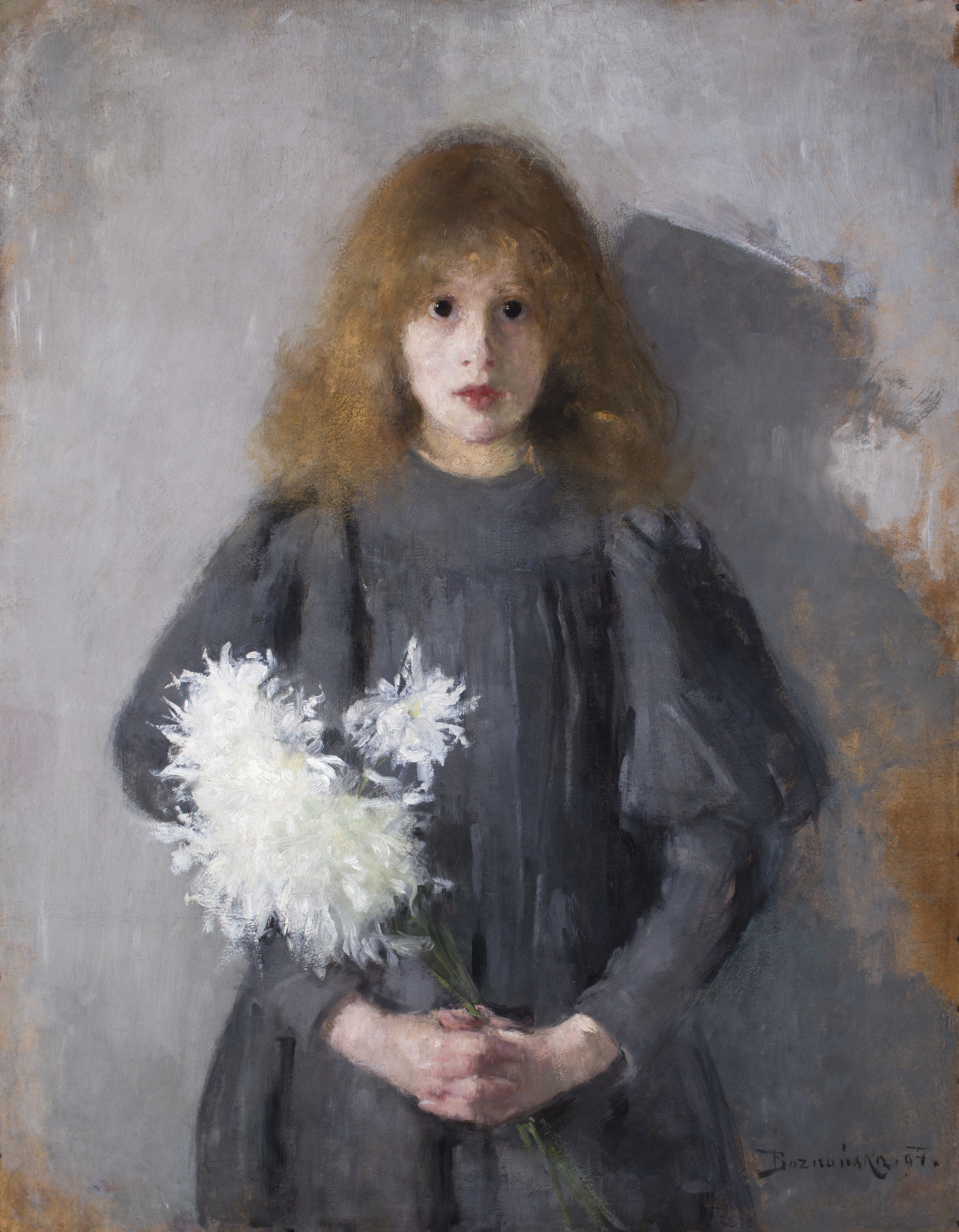
Girl with Chrysanthemums, 1894, National Museum in Kraków

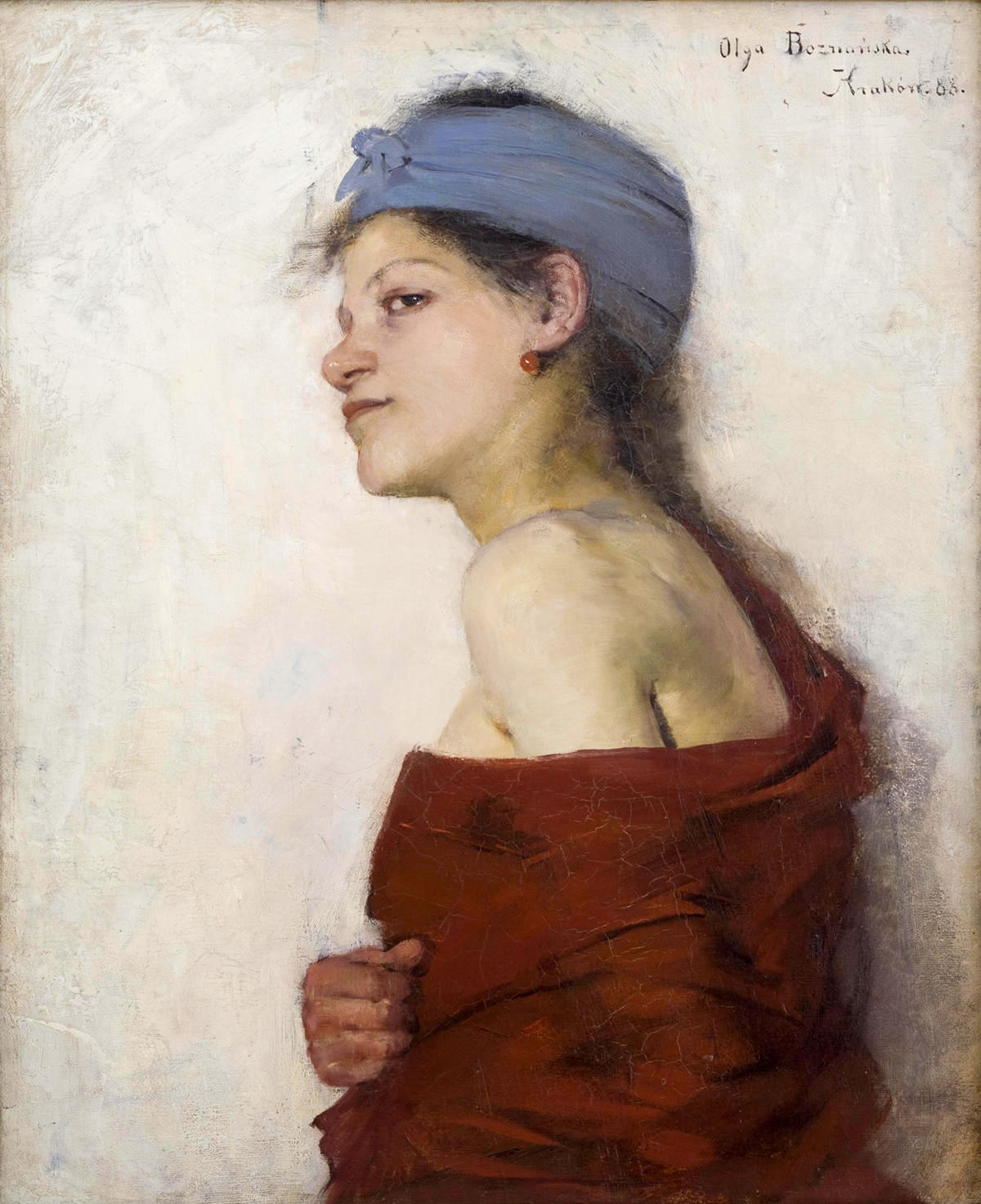
Portrait of a Woman, 1888, National Museum in Kraków

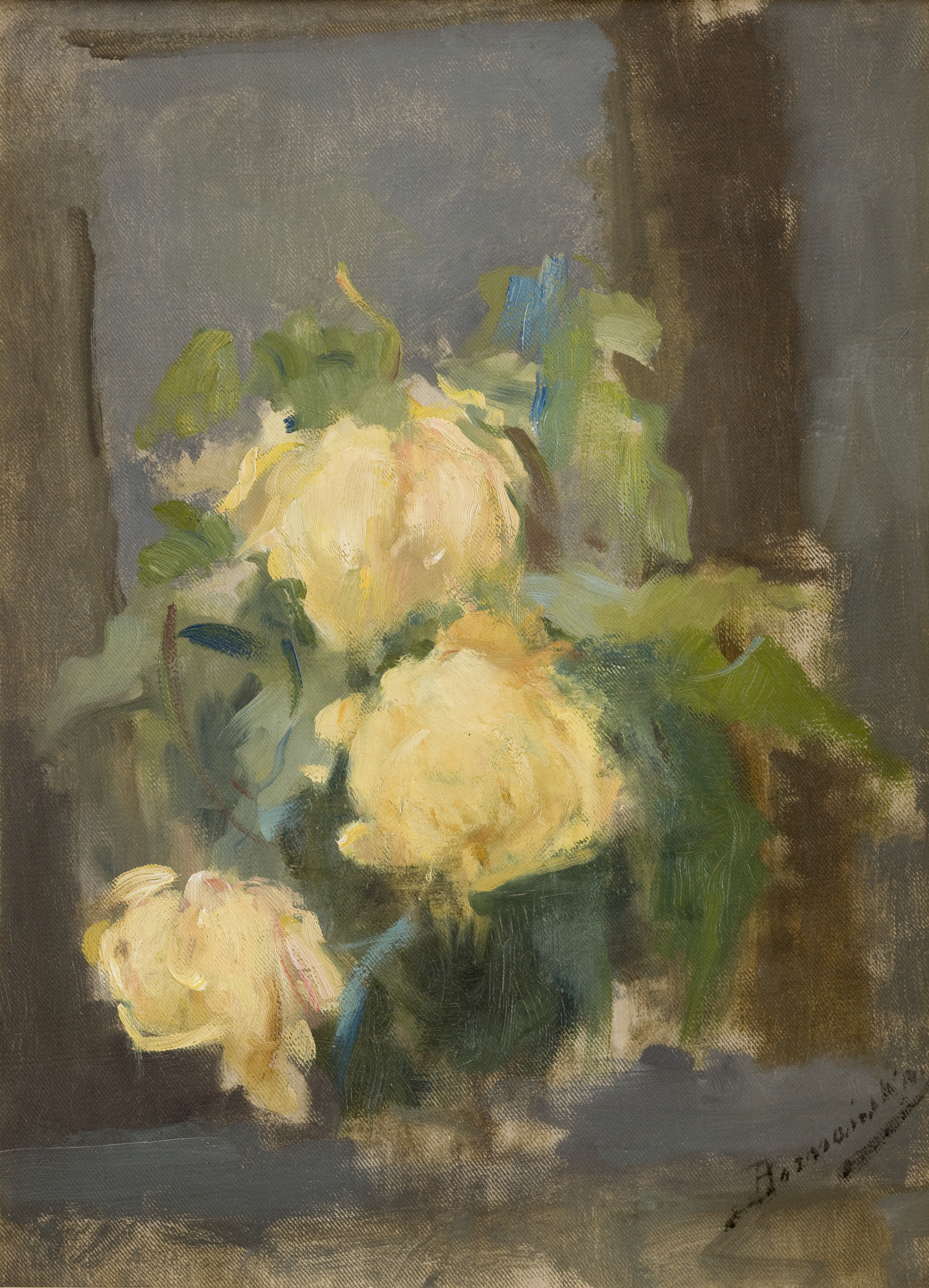
Golden Roses, 1896, National Museum in Kraków

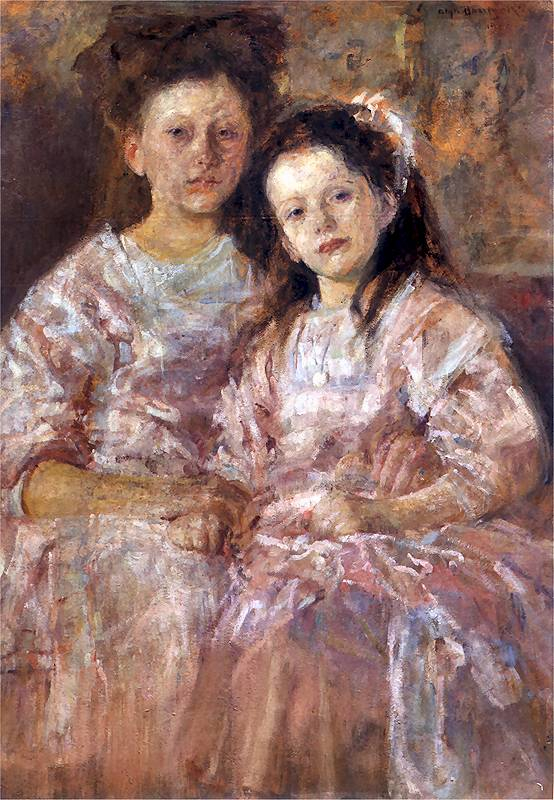
Two Girls Cuddling, 1906, National Museum in Warsaw

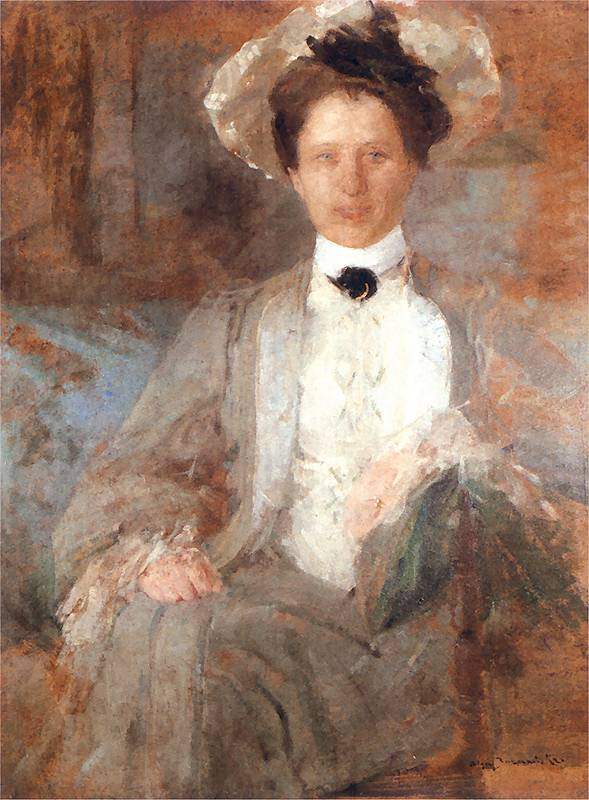
Portrait of a Lady in a White Hat, 1906, Silesian Museum in Katowice

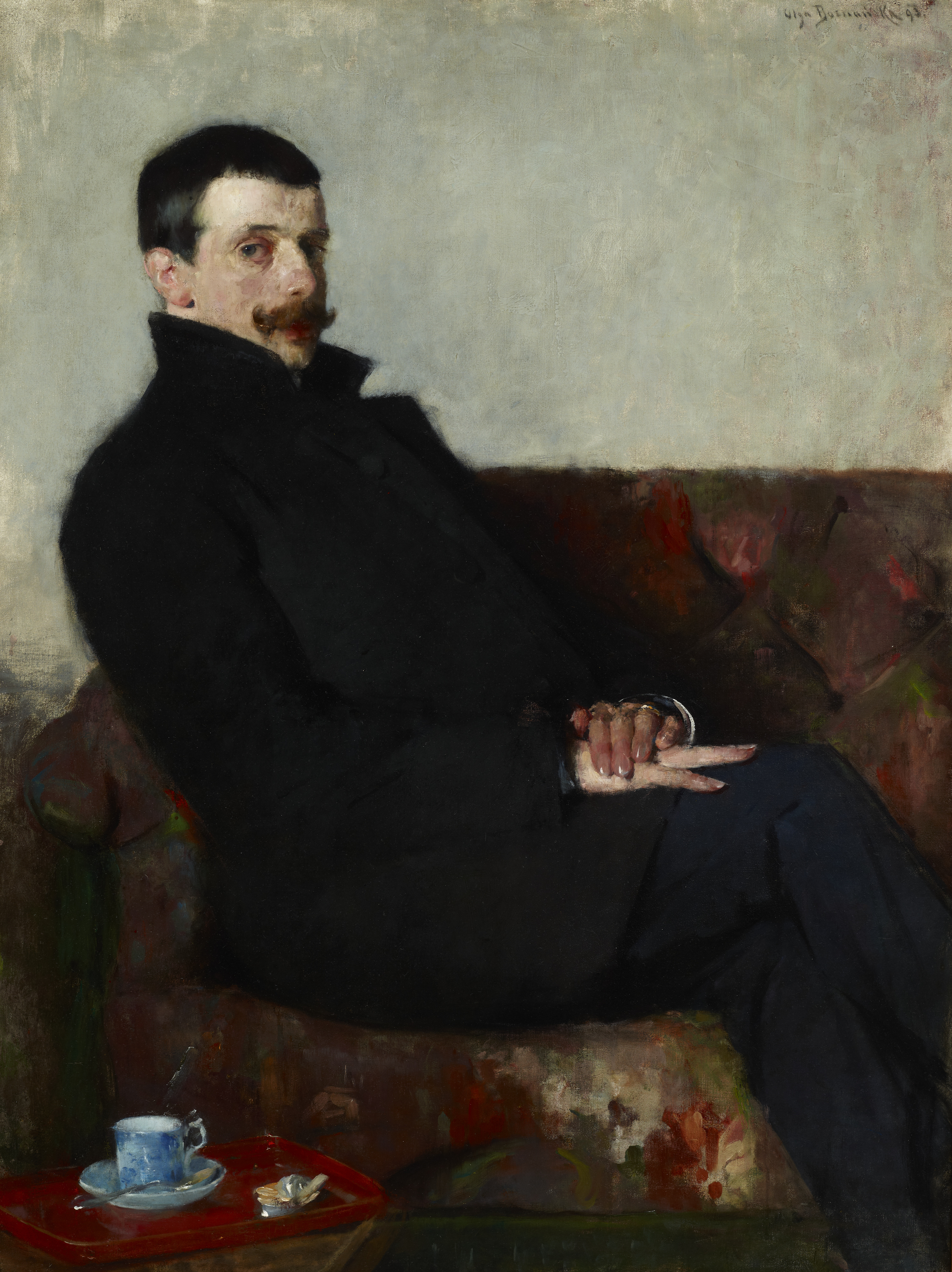
Portrait of Paul Neuen, 1893, National Museum in Kraków

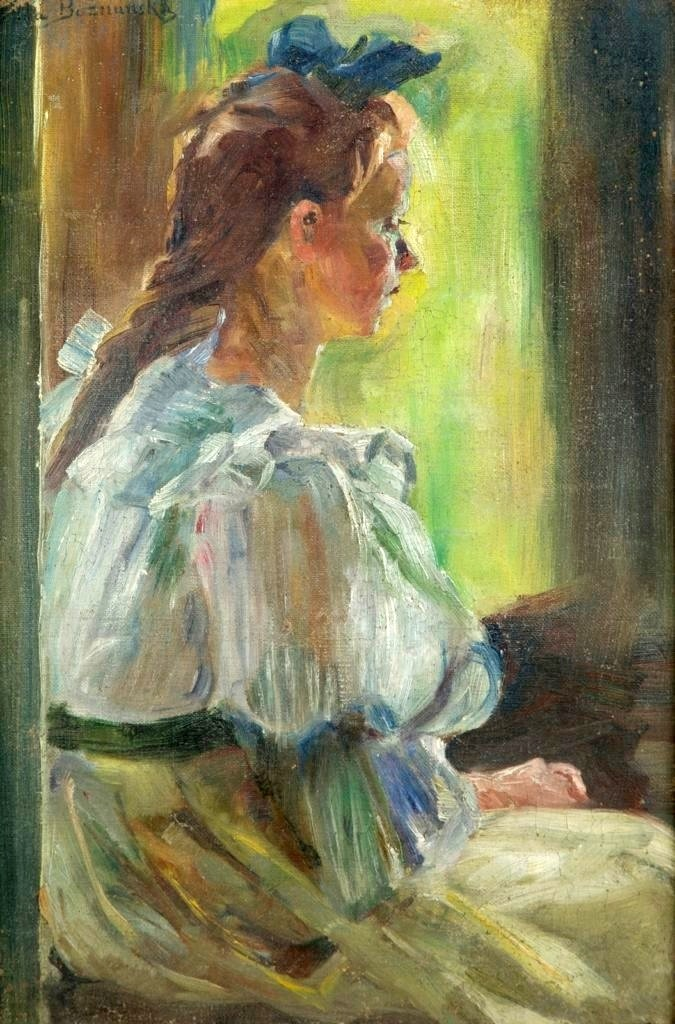
Girl by the Window, ca. 1980, Museum of Upper Silesia

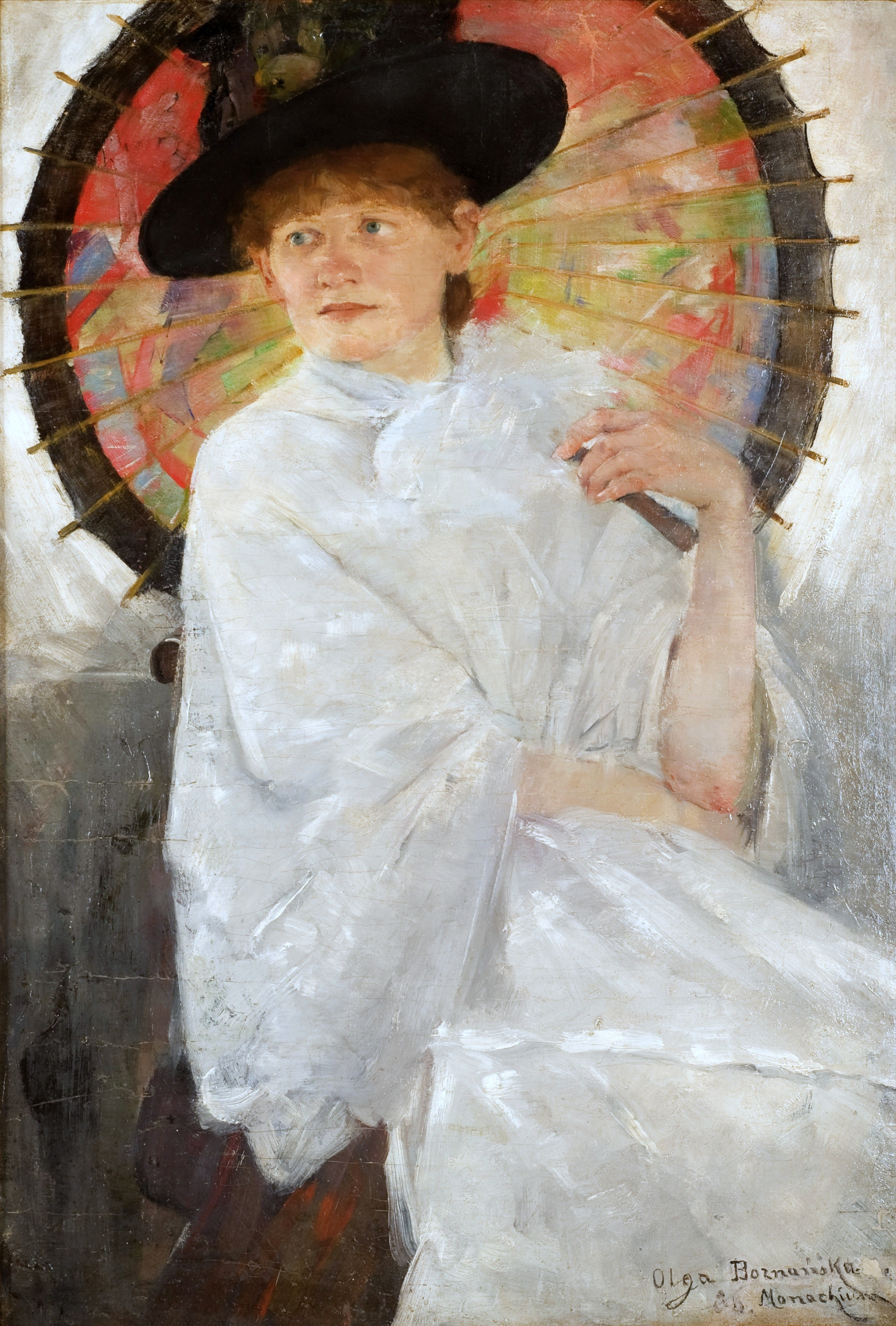
Young Lady with an Umbrella, 1886, Private collection

== See also ==
- Culture of Poland
- List of Polish painters
