= The Temptation of Sir Percival =

Painting by Arthur Hacker

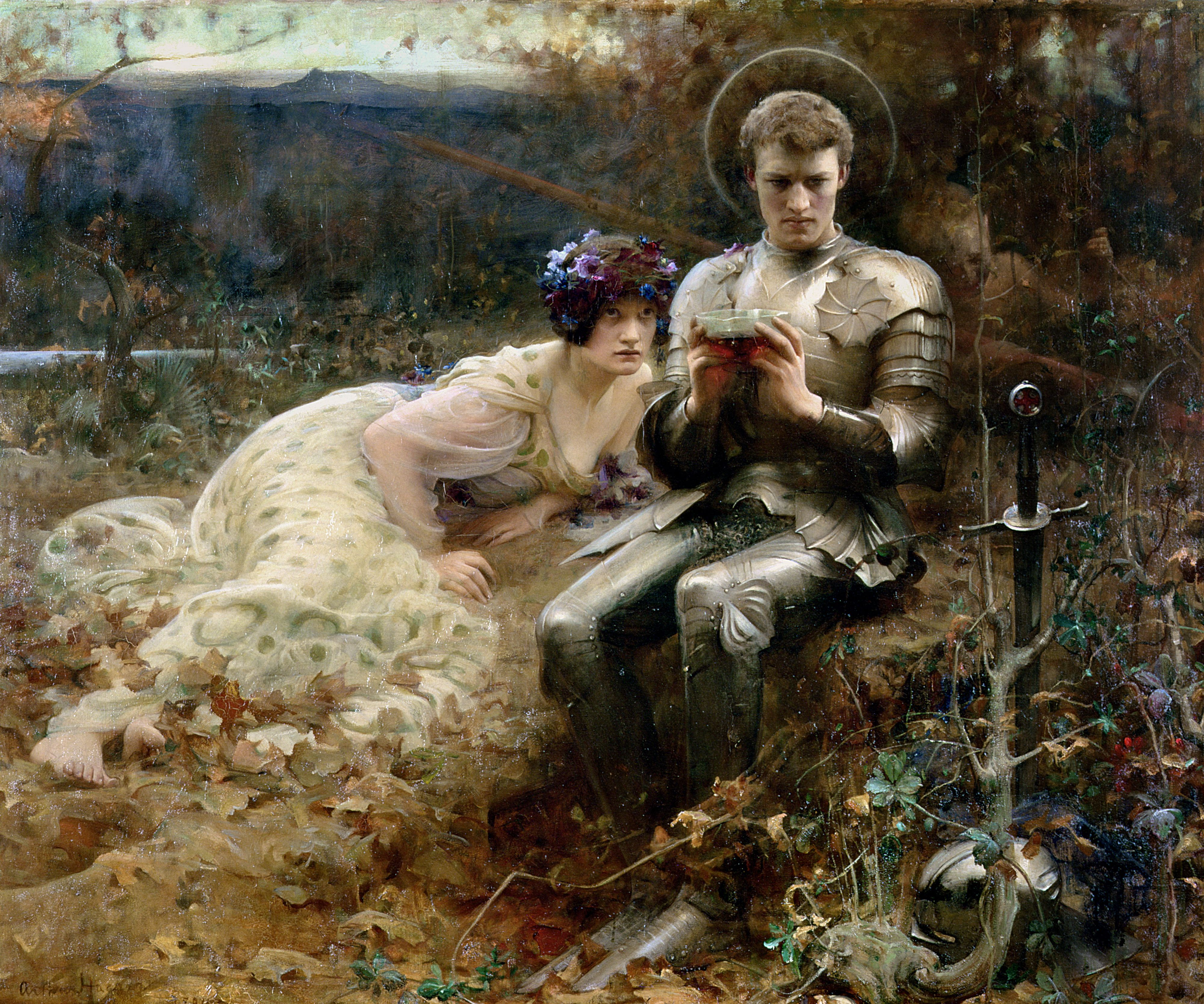
- Artist: Arthur Hacker
- Year: 1894
- Type: Oil on canvas, history painting
- Dimensions: 132.1 cm × 157.5 cm (52.0 in × 62.0 in)
- Location: Leeds Art Gallery, West Yorkshire

The Temptation of Sir Percival is an 1894 oil painting by the British artist Arthur Hacker. It depicts a scene inspired by Arthurian legend in which Sir Percival, one of the Knights of the Round Table, is tempted during his pursuit of the Holy Grail by a woman who attempts to seduce him.

Depictions of Arthurian stories were popular in Victorian art. Hacker used Thomas Malory's Le Morte d'Arthur as his source rather than the writings of Alfred Tennyson. In the painting the tempting beautiful, woman is the devil in disguise.

A number of Hacker's pictures show a strong Pre-Raphaelite influence. The painting was displayed at the Royal Academy Exhibition of 1894 held at Burlington House in London. The following year it was acquired by Leeds Art Gallery in Yorkshire.

== Bibliography ==
- Kestner, Joseph A. Masculinities in Victorian Painting. Scolar Press, 1985
- Poulson, Christine. The Quest for the Grail: Arthurian Legend in British Art, 1840-1920. Manchester University Press, 1999.
- Stevens, Mary Anne. The Last Romantics: The Romantic Tradition in British Art, Burne-Jones to Stanley Spencer. Lund Humphries? 1989.
