= Girl with Chrysanthemums =

1894 painting by Olga Boznańska

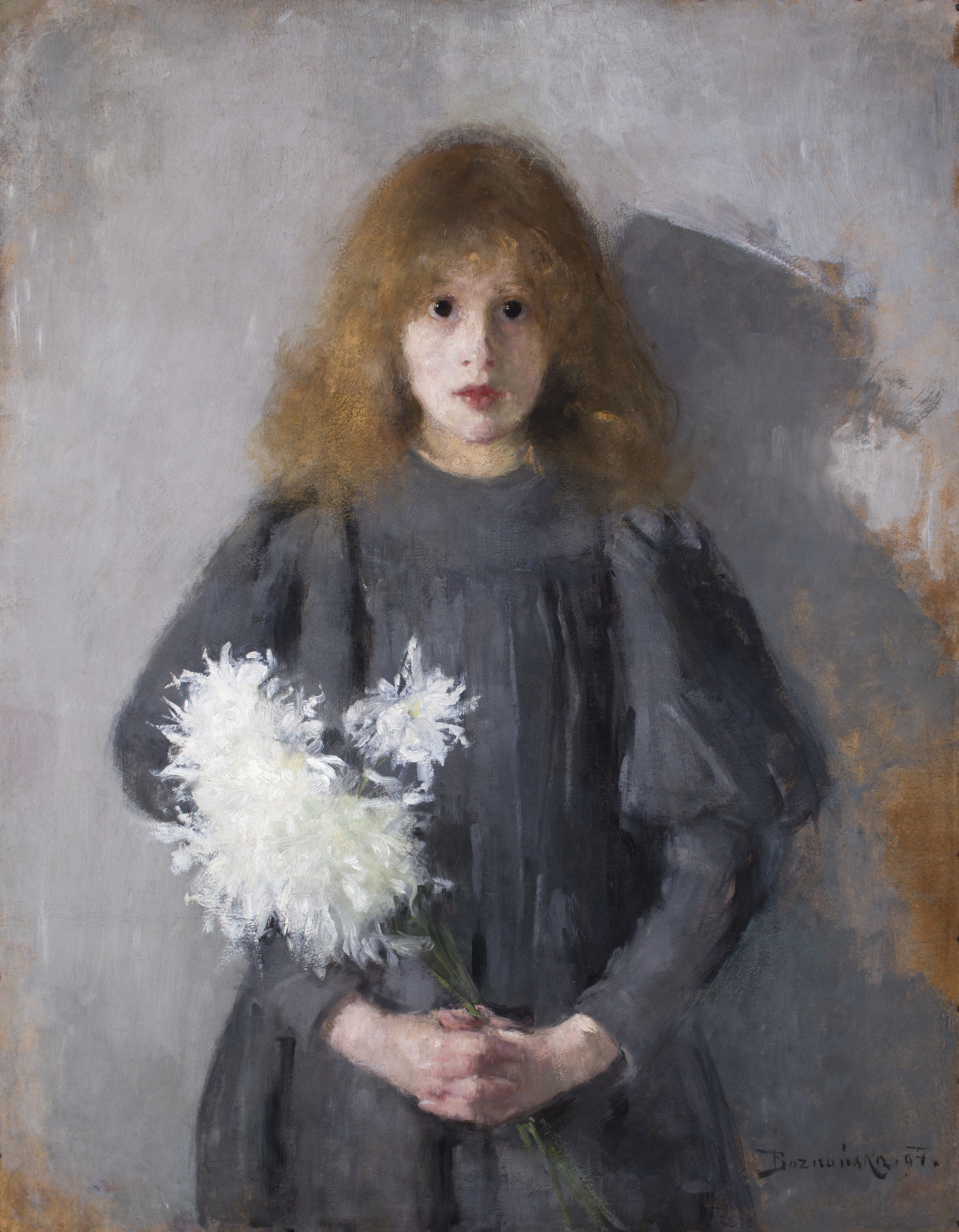
- Artist: Olga Boznańska
- Year: 1894
- Medium: Oil-on-pasteboard
- Dimensions: 88.5 cm × 69 cm (34.8 in × 27.1 in)
- Location: National Museum; Kraków

Girl with Chrysanthemums (Polish: Dziewczynka z chryzantemami) is an 1894 oil painting by the Polish post-impressionist painter Olga Boznańska (1865–1940). It resides in the Gallery of Polish 19th-Century Art at the National Museum in Kraków, Poland.

== Description ==
The painting depicts a young girl standing alone and holding a bunch of white chrysanthemums in her hands. The girls' pale, thoughtful face has an anxious and solemn expression. She has loose bright-red hair, small red lips and slightly glittery, big, black eyes. She wears a simple blue and grey dress. The girl's figure casts a clearly visible shadow to her right on the wall behind her. The painting lacks sharp lines and contours and the figure of the girl as well as the background consists of multiple spots of colour.

== Analysis ==
Girl with Chrysanthemums is considered among the most representative works of the artist. It was painted in 1894 in Munich. Boznańska was particularly fascinated by the atmospheric paintings of James Abbott McNeill Whistler and became familiarized with the artistic trends in Paris, which made her reject the traditions of the Munich School. She decided to go against the popular conventions concerning child portraits in which children were often depicted wearing elegant and fancy outfits in richly decorated interiors or with landscapes in the background. She introduced her own method of portraying children with neutral background and figures subjected to a thorough coloristic analysis. According to Urszula Kozakowska-Zaucha the painting "creates the atmosphere of contemplation, sadness, mystery and understatement" which are reminiscent of the poems by Maurice Maeterlinck whom Boznańska held in high regard. In 1896, writing for the Gazette des Beaux-Arts William Ritter observed that "it is an enigmatic child who drives mad those who observe her for too long". A sense of innocence of the child, her calm posture and delicate facial features are contrasted with the painting's aura of anxiety and melancholy. The artist expressed the girl's mental state as well as the atmosphere of her surroundings in a subtle way, which reveals her keen interest in the new ideological trends in literature and art of the period.

== See also ==
- List of Polish painters
- Women artists
- A Negress
