= Arthur Hacker =

English painter (1858–1919)

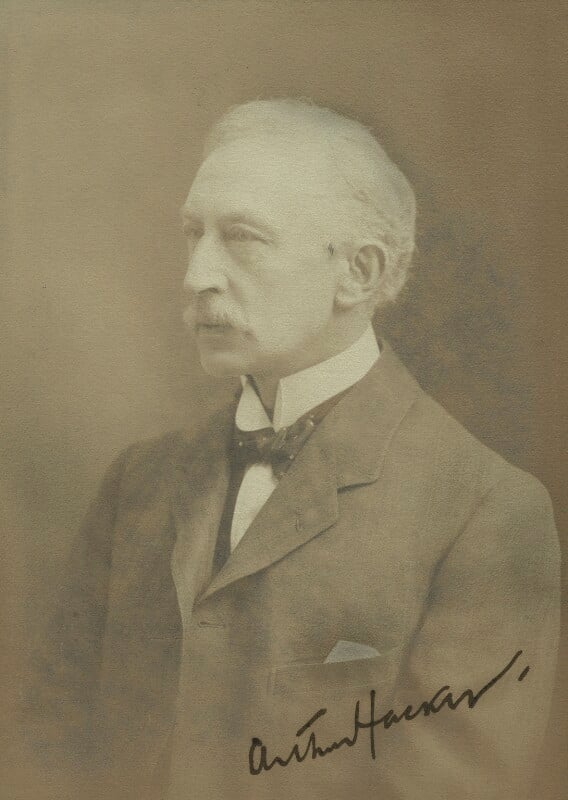
Hacker, 1910–1919

Arthur Hacker RA (St Pancras, Middlesex, 25 September 1858 – 12 November 1919 Kensington, London) was an English classical painter.

== Biography ==
Hacker was the son of Edward Hacker (1812–1905), a line engraver specialising in animal and sporting prints (who was also for many years the registrar of Births and Deaths for the Kentish Town sub-district of Pancras Registration District, Middlesex).

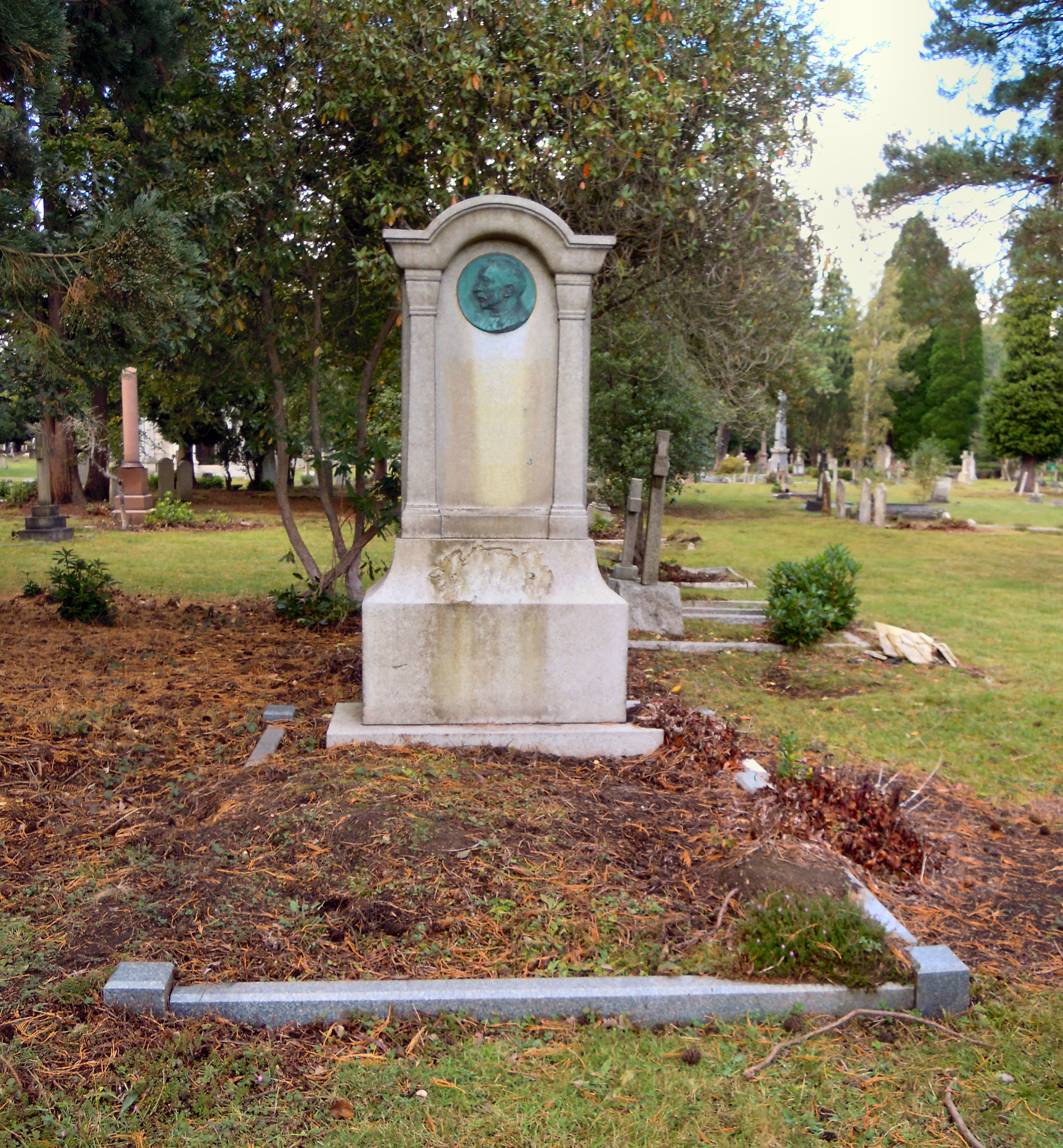
Hacker's grave in Brookwood Cemetery

In his art he was most known for painting religious scenes and portraits, and his art was also influenced by his extensive travels in Spain and North Africa. He studied at the Royal Academy between 1876 and 1880, and at the Atelier Bonnat in Paris. He was twice exhibited at the Royal Academy, in 1878 and 1910, and was elected an Academician in 1910 submitting A Wet Night at Piccadilly Circus as his diploma work. In 1894 he was the subject of a bust by Edward Onslow Ford. An original portrait by Hacker of Sir Alfred Keogh hangs in the RAMC HQ Mess at Millbank, London.

In 1902, Hacker built a new house at Heath End, Checkendon, Oxfordshire, called Hall Ingle, commissioning the young architect Maxwell Ayrton and carrying out the decorations himself.

Paintings on public display include The Annunciation at Tate Britain, Pelagia and Philammon in Liverpool's Walker Art Gallery, The Children's Prayer (1888), The Atkinson Museum, Southport and The Temptation of Sir Percival in Leeds City Art Gallery.

He is buried in Brookwood Cemetery.

== Gallery ==
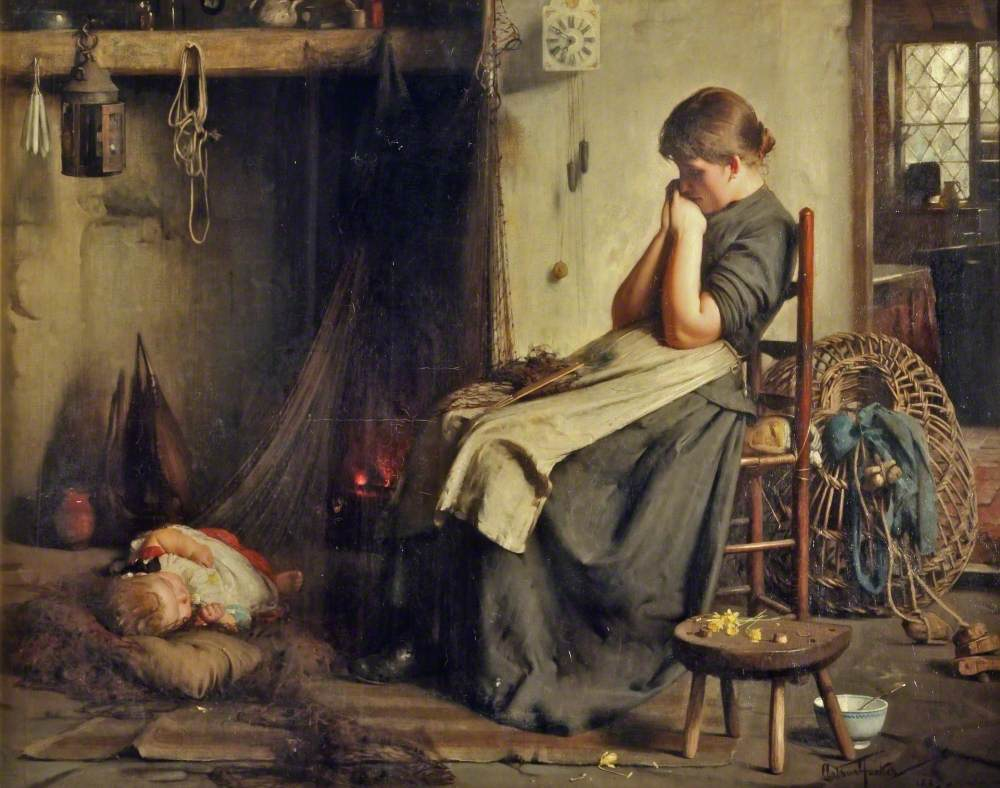
Fisherman's Wife, 1885

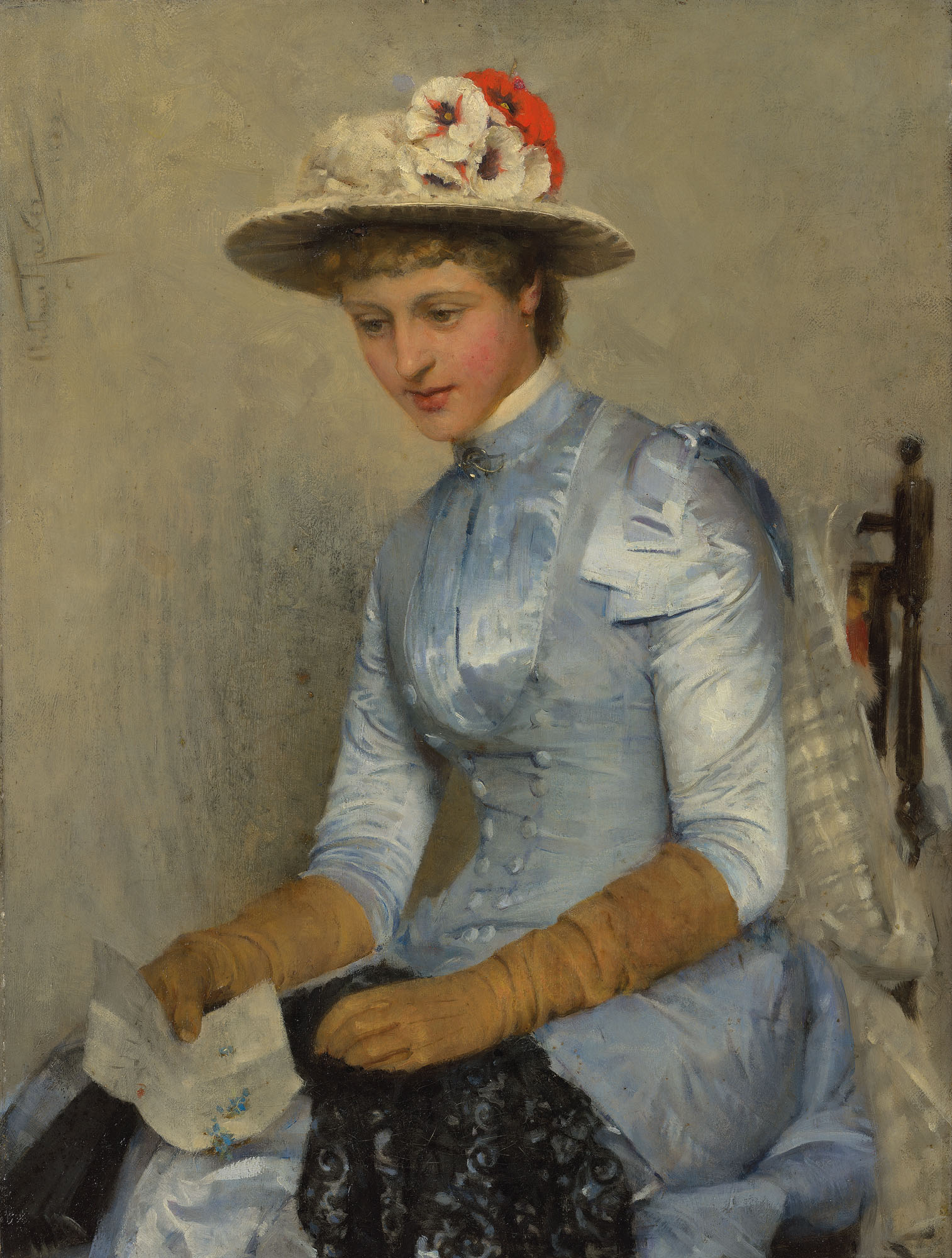
Forget Me Nots, 1887

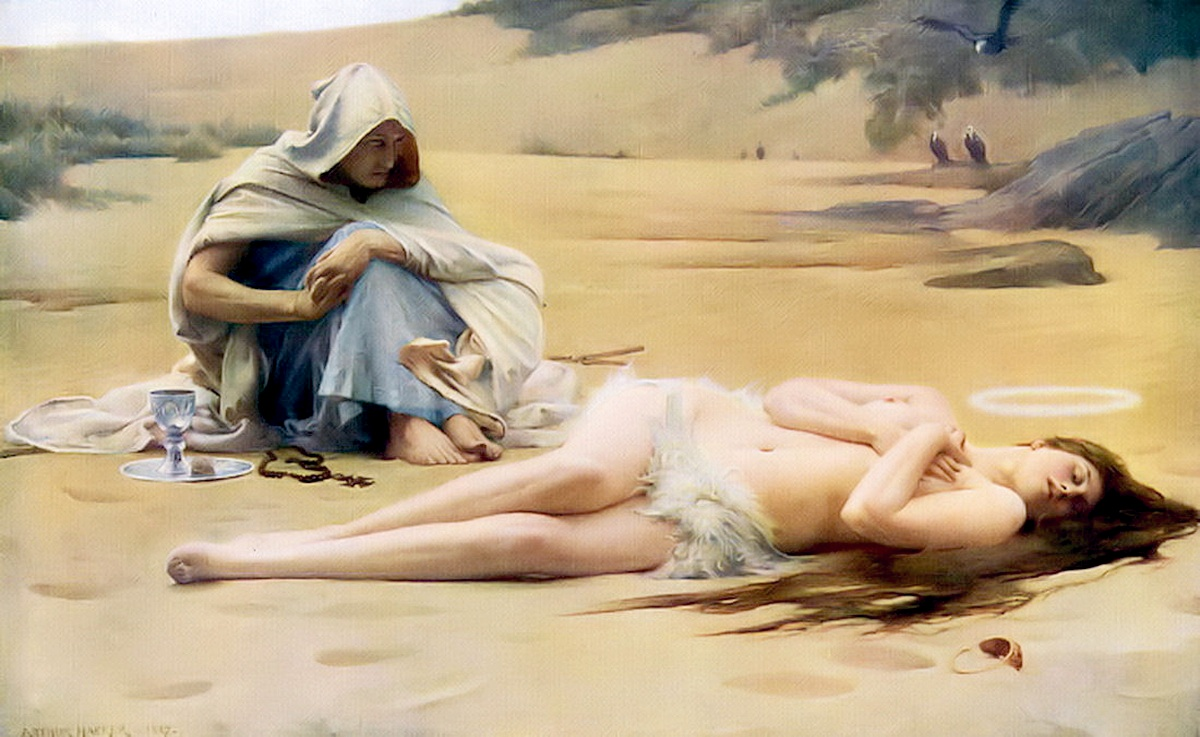
Pelagia and Philammon, 1887

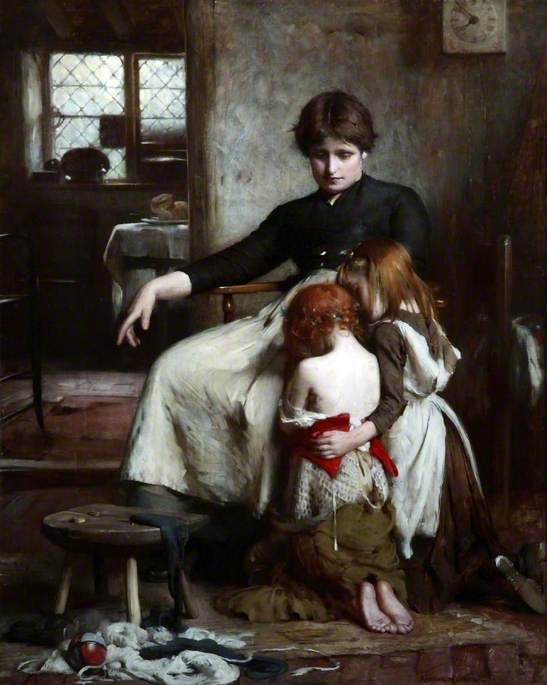
The Children's Prayer, 1888

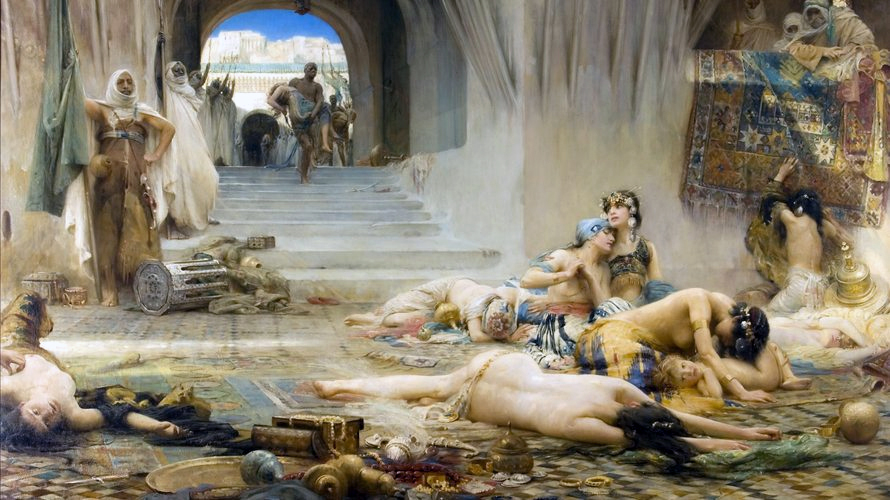
Vae Victus, 1890

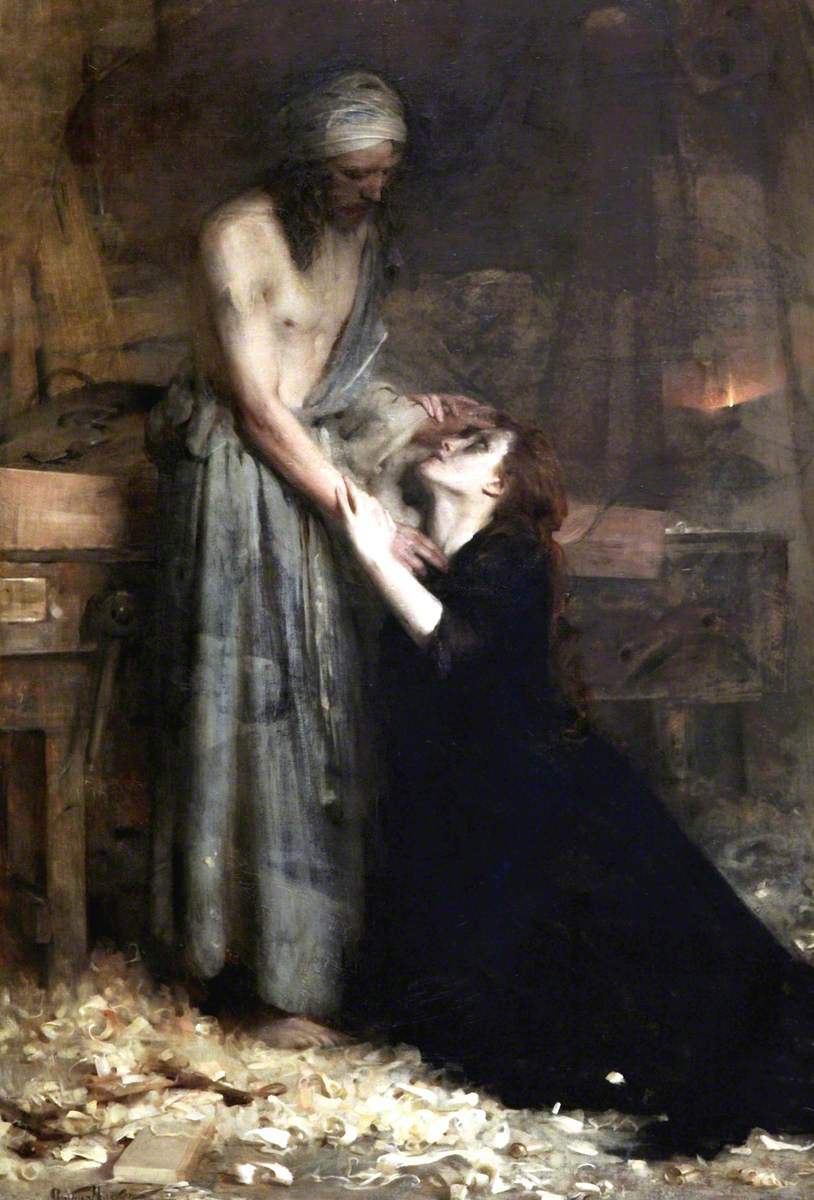
Christ and the Magdalene, 1890

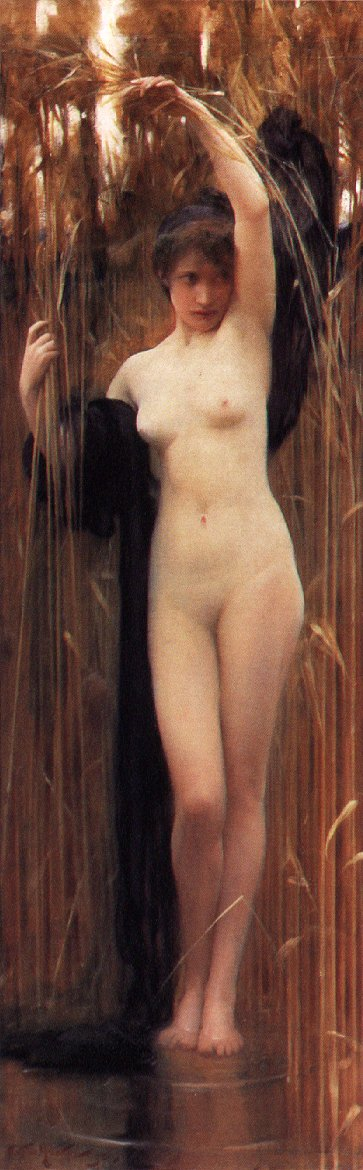
Syrinx, 1892

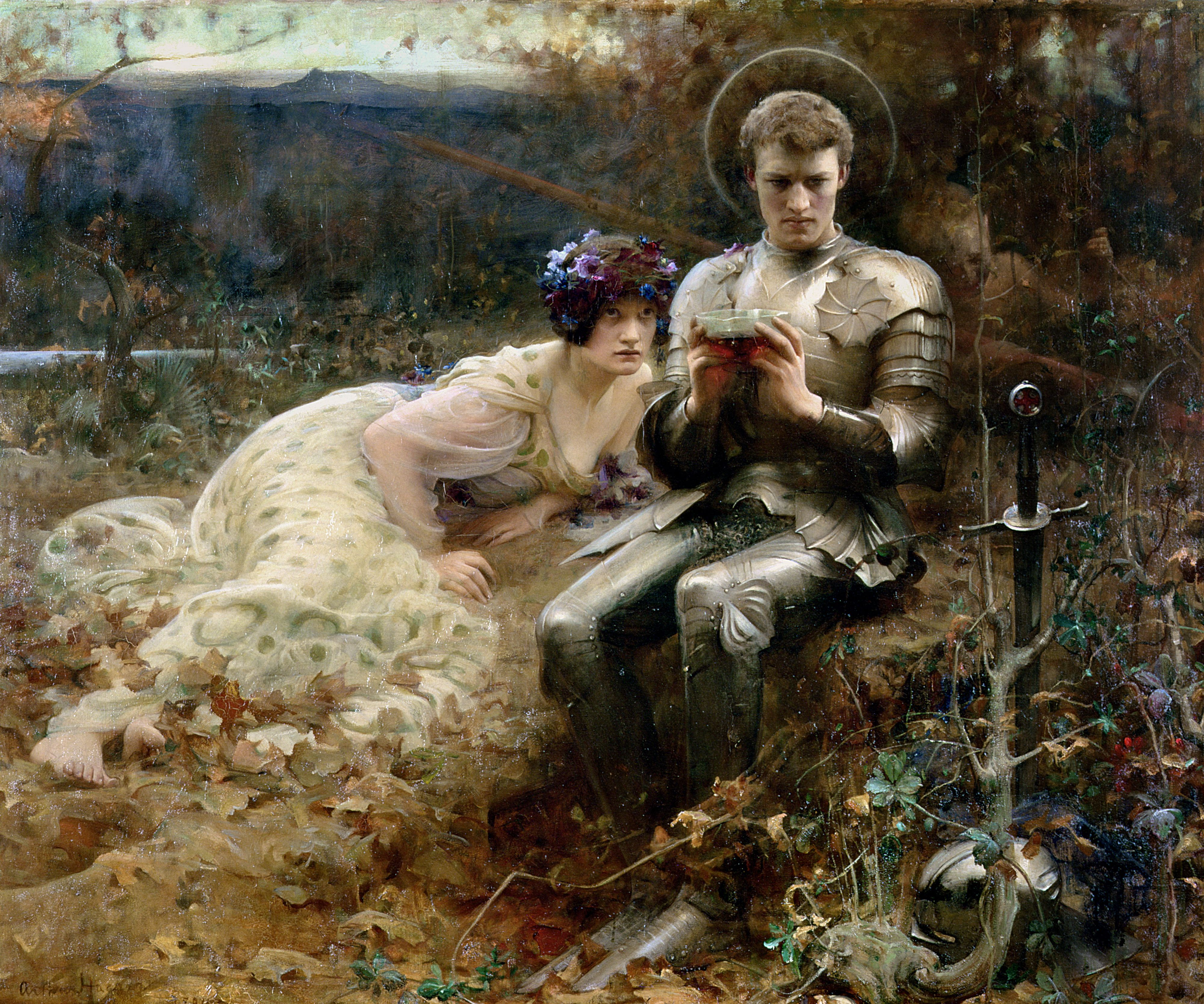
The Temptation of Sir Percival, 1894

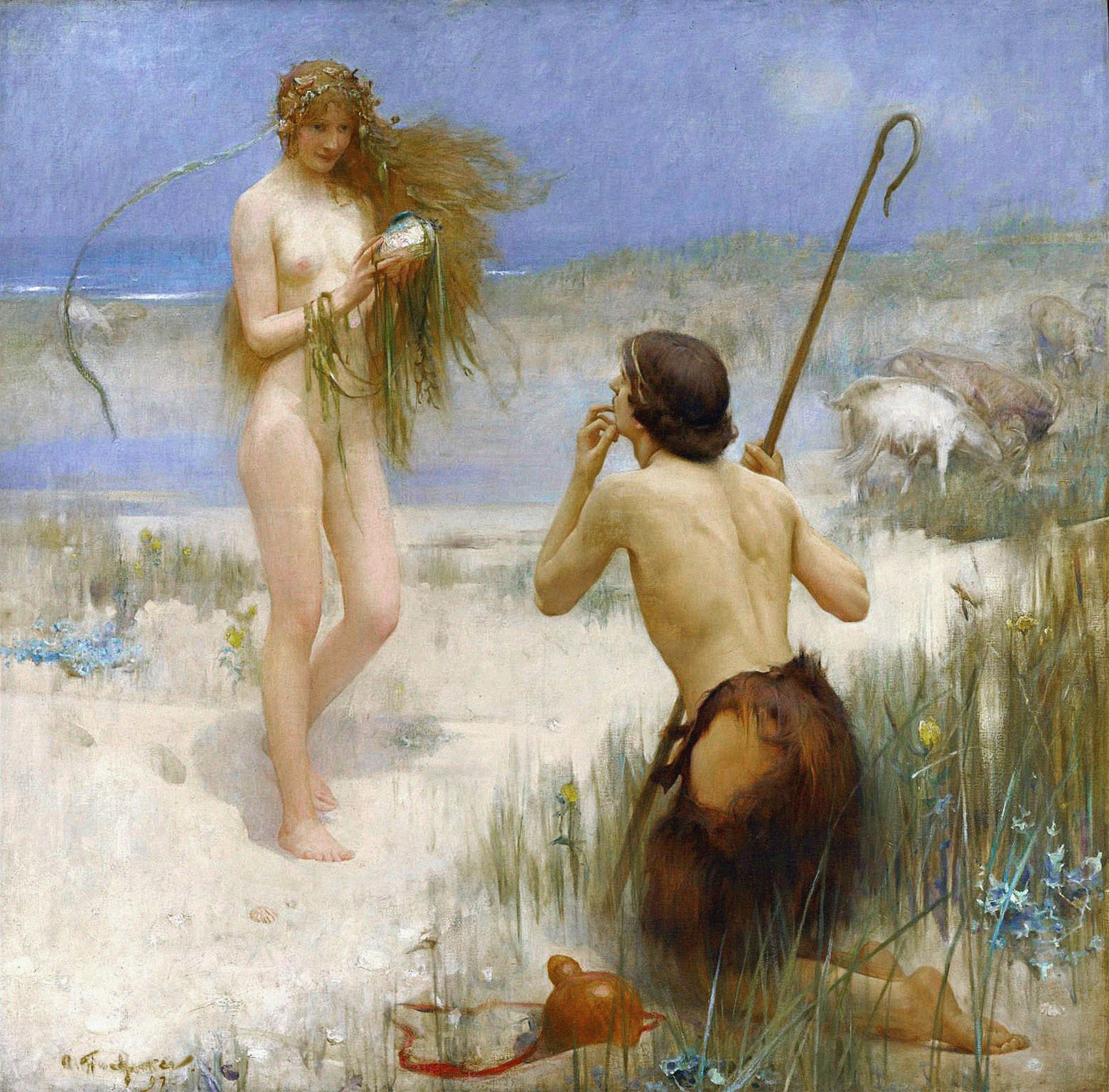
The Sea Maid, 1897

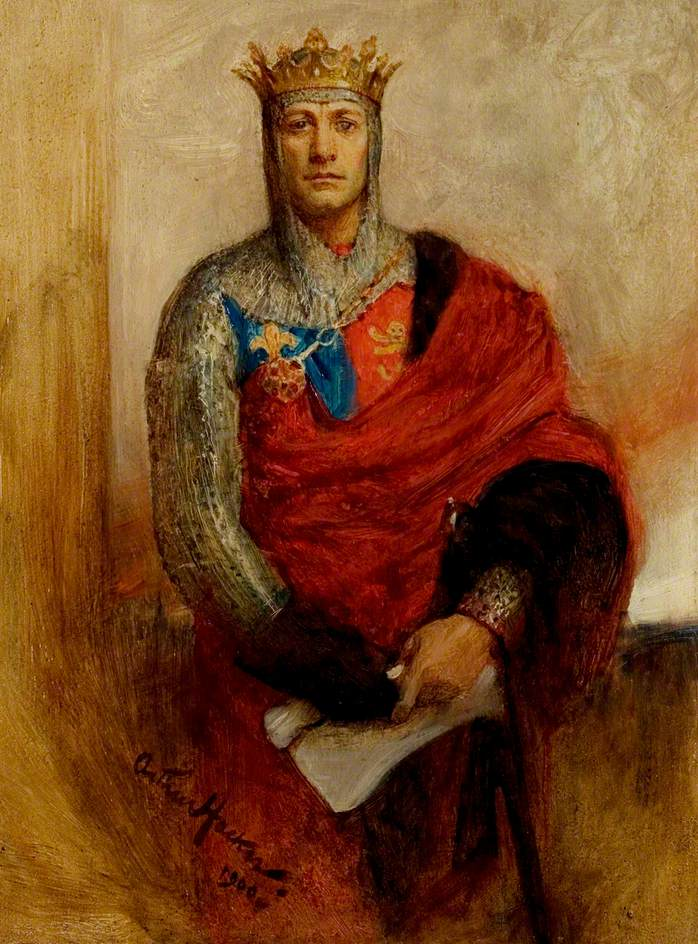
Lewis Waller as Henry V, 1900

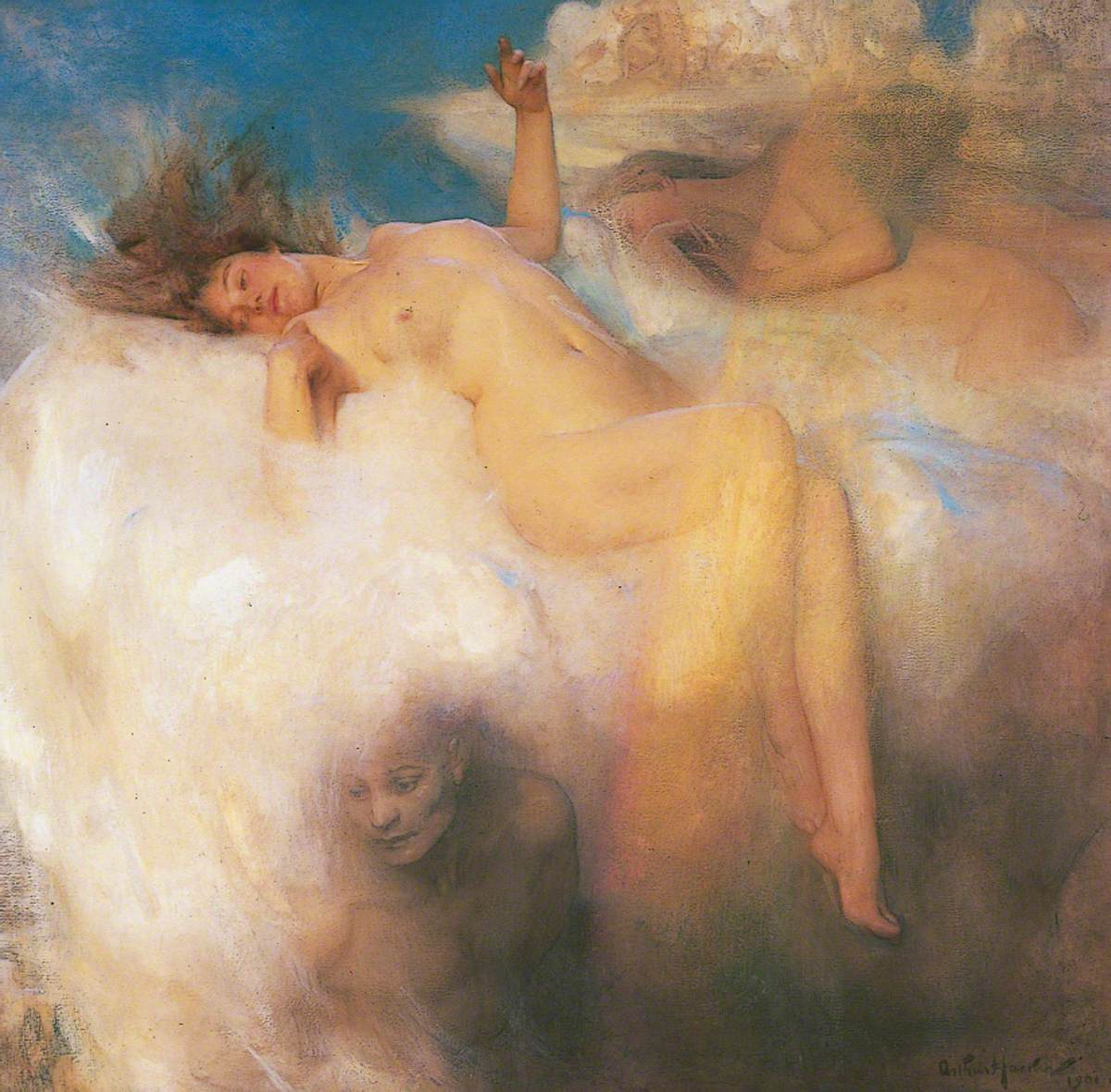
The Cloud, 1901

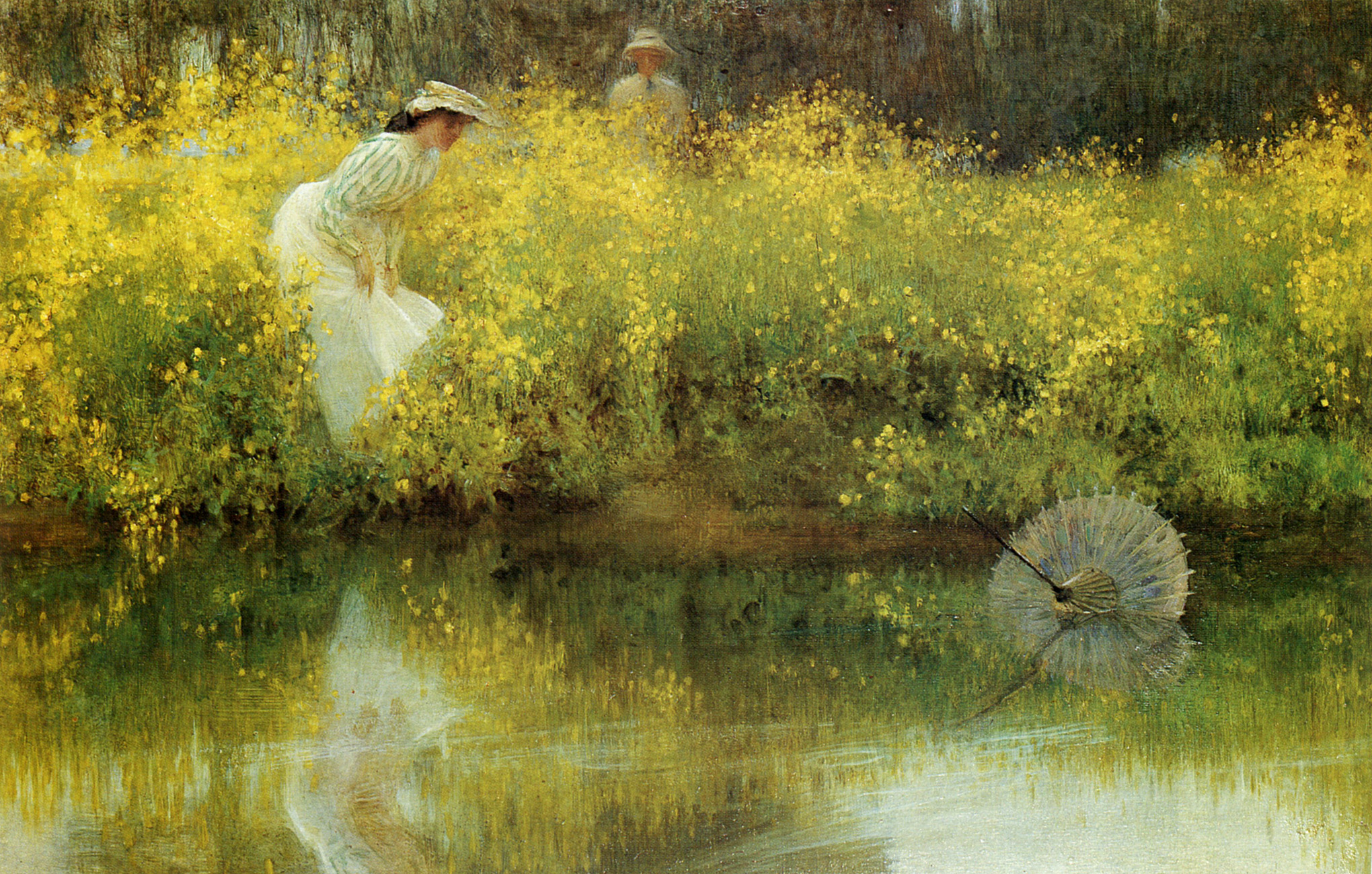
In Jeopardy, 1902

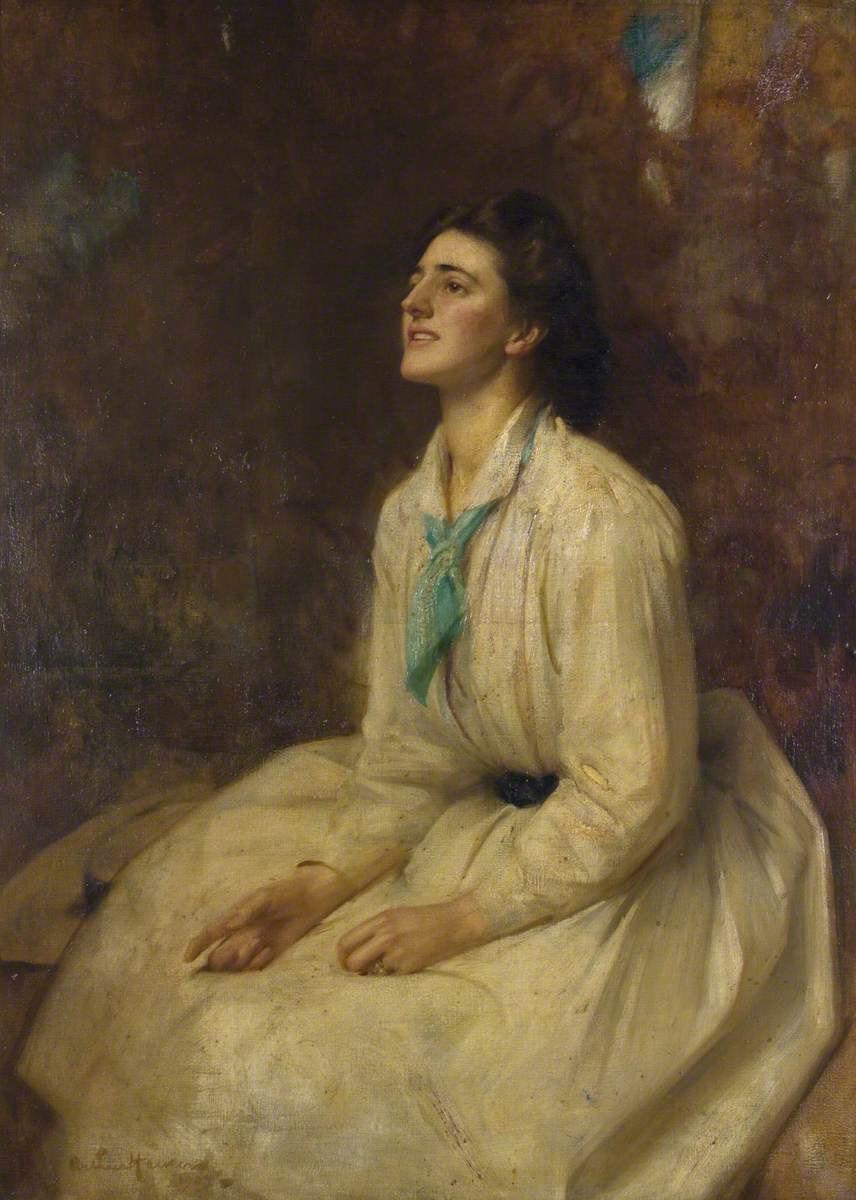
The Skylark, 1907

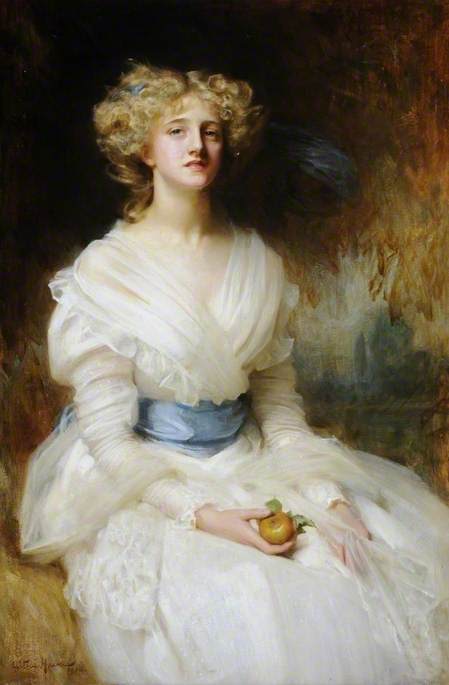
Portrait of Ivy Close, 1908

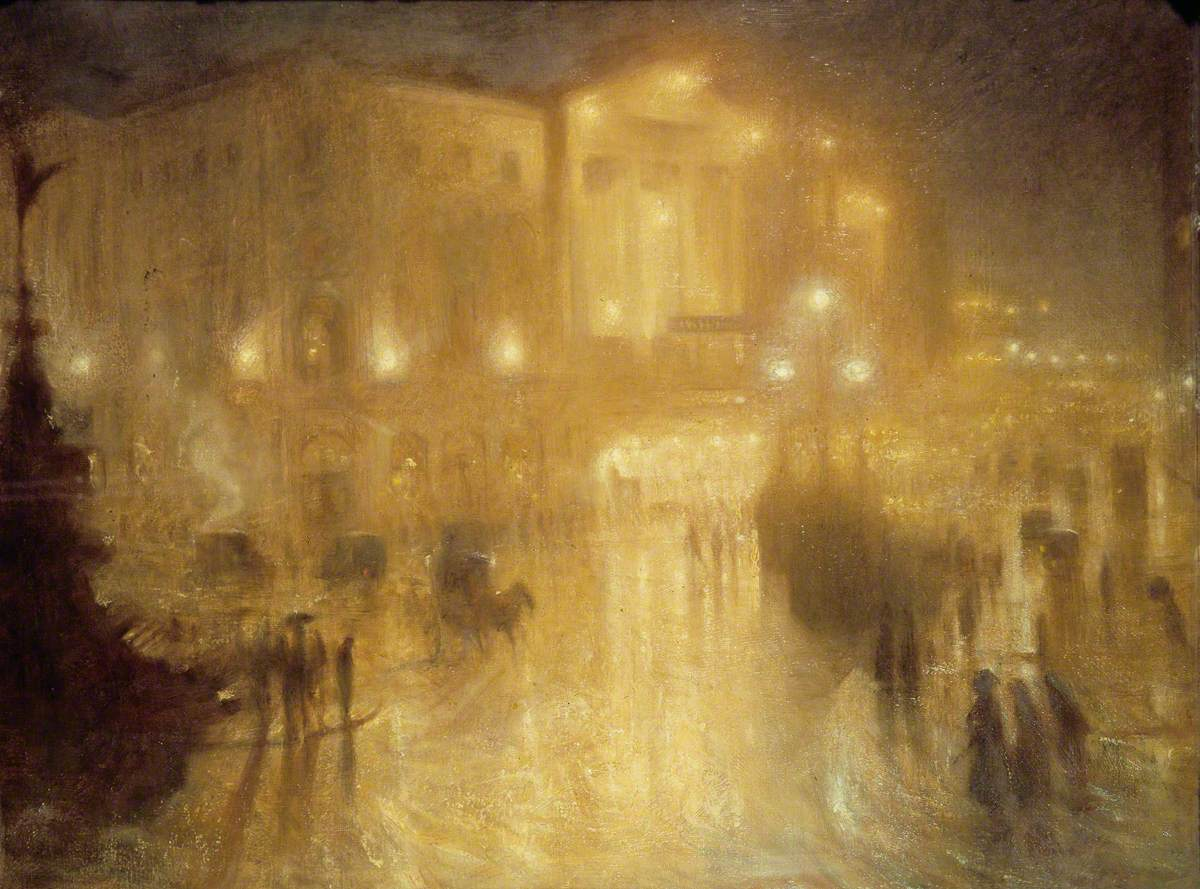
A Wet Night at Piccadilly Circus, 1910

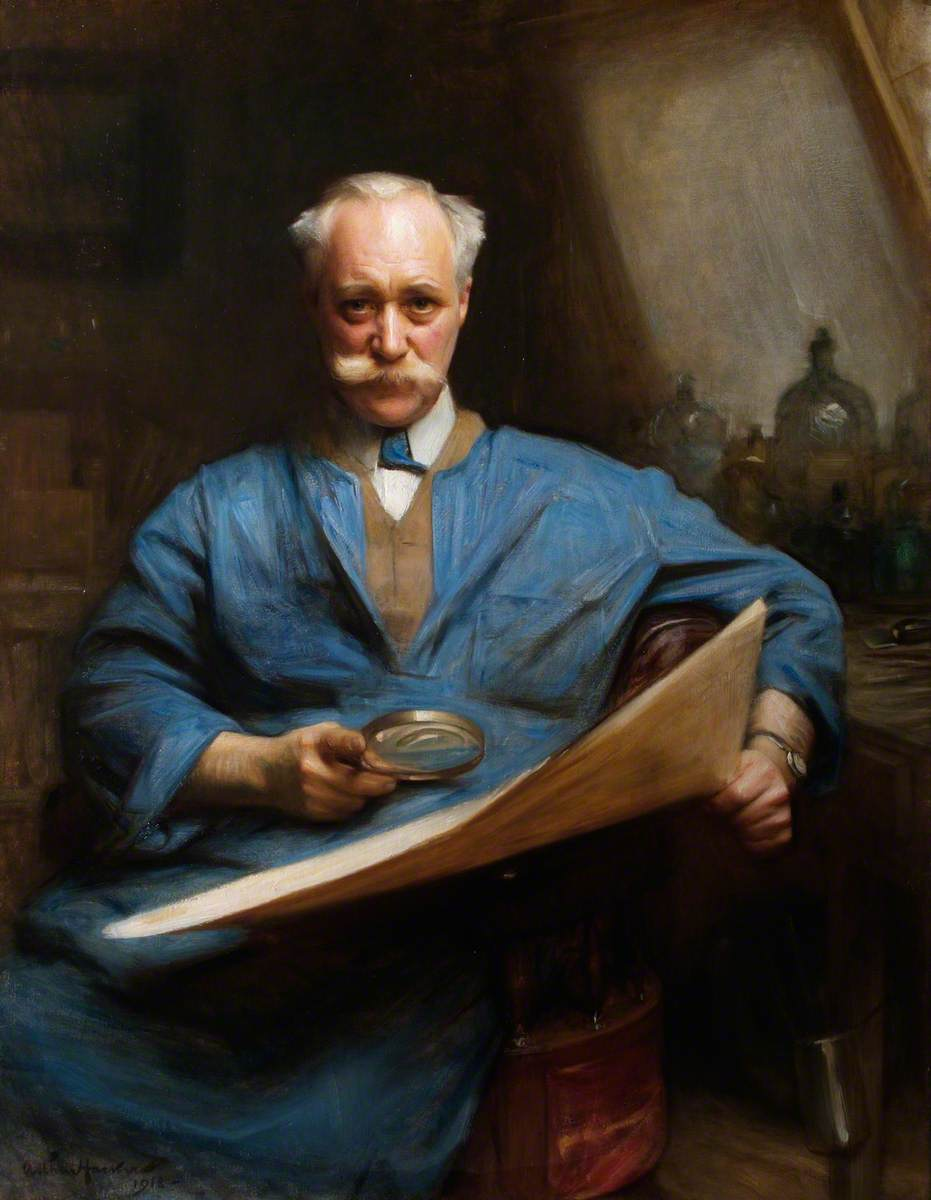
Portrait of Frank Short. 1918
