= Dicksee =

Dicksee may refer to:

- Thomas Francis Dicksee, (1819–1895), English painter.
- Frank Bernard Dicksee (1853–1928), English painter.
- Herbert Dicksee (1862–1942), English painter.
