= Herbert Dicksee =

English painter

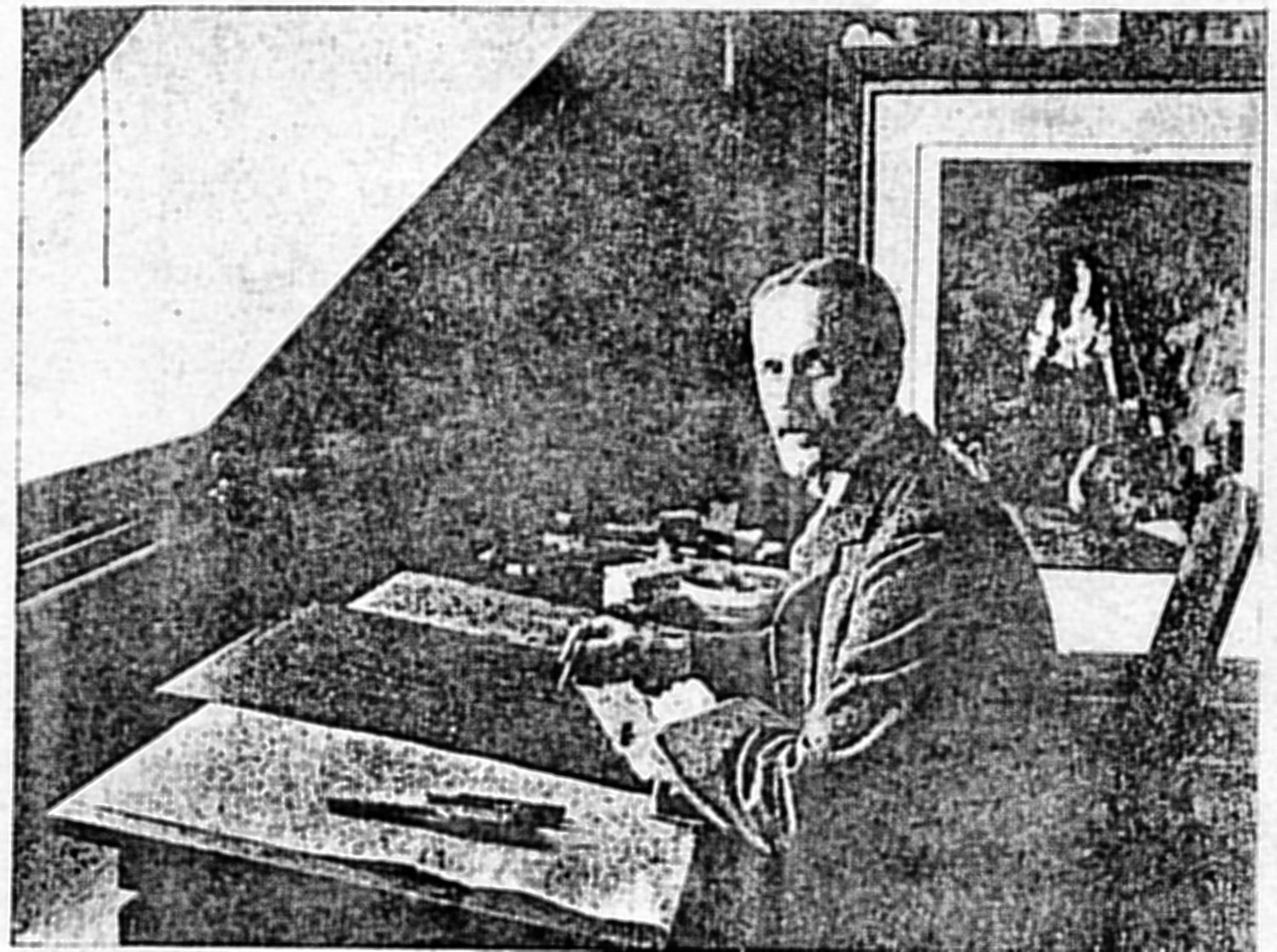
Herbert Dicksee at work in his studio, circa 1906.

Herbert Thomas Dicksee (14 June 1862 – 20 February 1942) was an English painter who specialised in oil paintings of dogs, particularly the deerhound. Prints and etchings of his best-known paintings were widely distributed by publishers such as Klackner of London, and his work is popular among collectors and dog enthusiasts today.

Dicksee belonged to an illustrious artistic family. His father was the artist John Dicksee (1817–1905). John's brother Thomas Dicksee (1819–1895), also a painter, was the father of Sir Frank Dicksee (1853–1928), president of the Royal Academy from 1924 until his death. (Herbert, meanwhile, had one sister, whose name was Amy.) Dicksee studied art at the Slade School, London, on a scholarship. His first painting was exhibited in 1881.

Dicksee specialised in sympathetic paintings of hounds, such as "After Chevy Chase" and "Silent Sympathy", but he also painted big cats at London Zoo, of which he was a fellow. His paintings were usually done from life; he kept numerous dogs as pets. Those pets featured in his etchings included a bloodhound, a French Bulldog named "Shaver", and several pugs and Bull Terriers.

Many of Dicksee's works, especially those painted during the war, depict the dogs accompanying melancholy young ladies. His most frequent model was the actress Gladys Cooper.

The artist married Ella Crump in 1896, and they had two children, Maurice (who was killed in World War I) and Dorothy (who also studied art). Herbert Dicksee died in 1942 in Hampstead. His daughter Dorothy was the executor of his will, which directed her to destroy most of the plates for Dicksee's etchings.

== Works ==
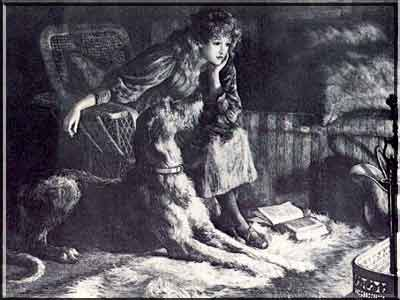
"Silent Sympathy" (1894)

This is an incomplete list.

- "Watercress Beds – Surrey" (1885)
- "Beauty and the Beast" (1887)
- "All His Troubles Before Him" (1887)
- "Silent Sympathy" (1894)
- "The Watcher on the Hill" (1900)
- "Where's Master?" (1911), commissioned by King Edward VII
- "The Kill" (1933)
- "Family of Bloodhounds" (1894 - Etching)
