= La Belle Dame sans Merci =

Ballad written by the English poet John Keats

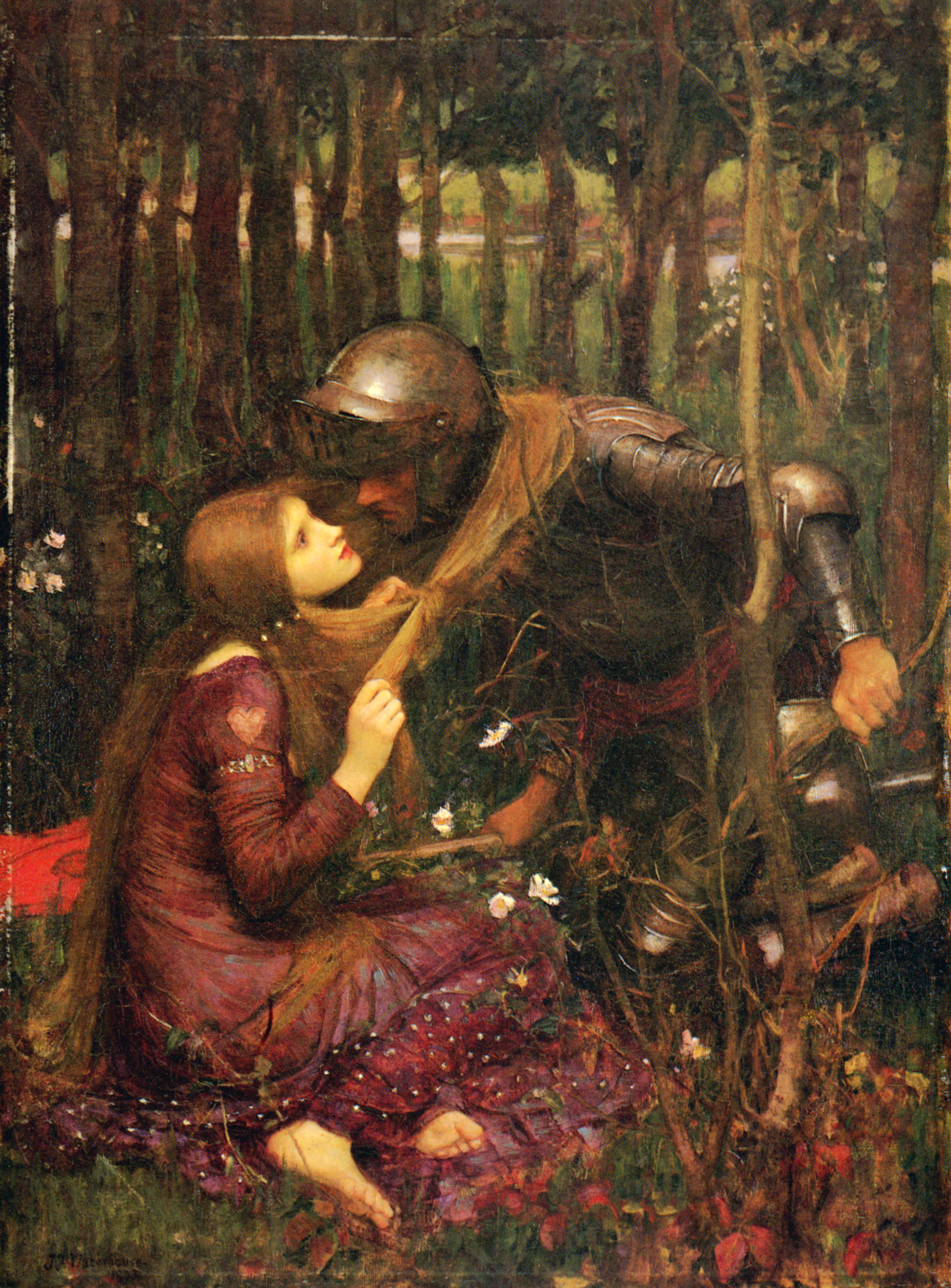
John William Waterhouse – La belle dame sans merci, 1893

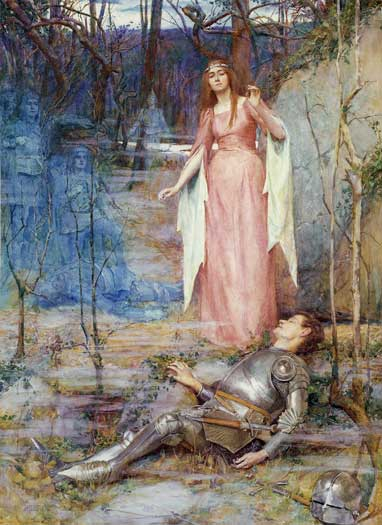
La Belle Dame sans Merci by Henry Meynell Rheam, 1901

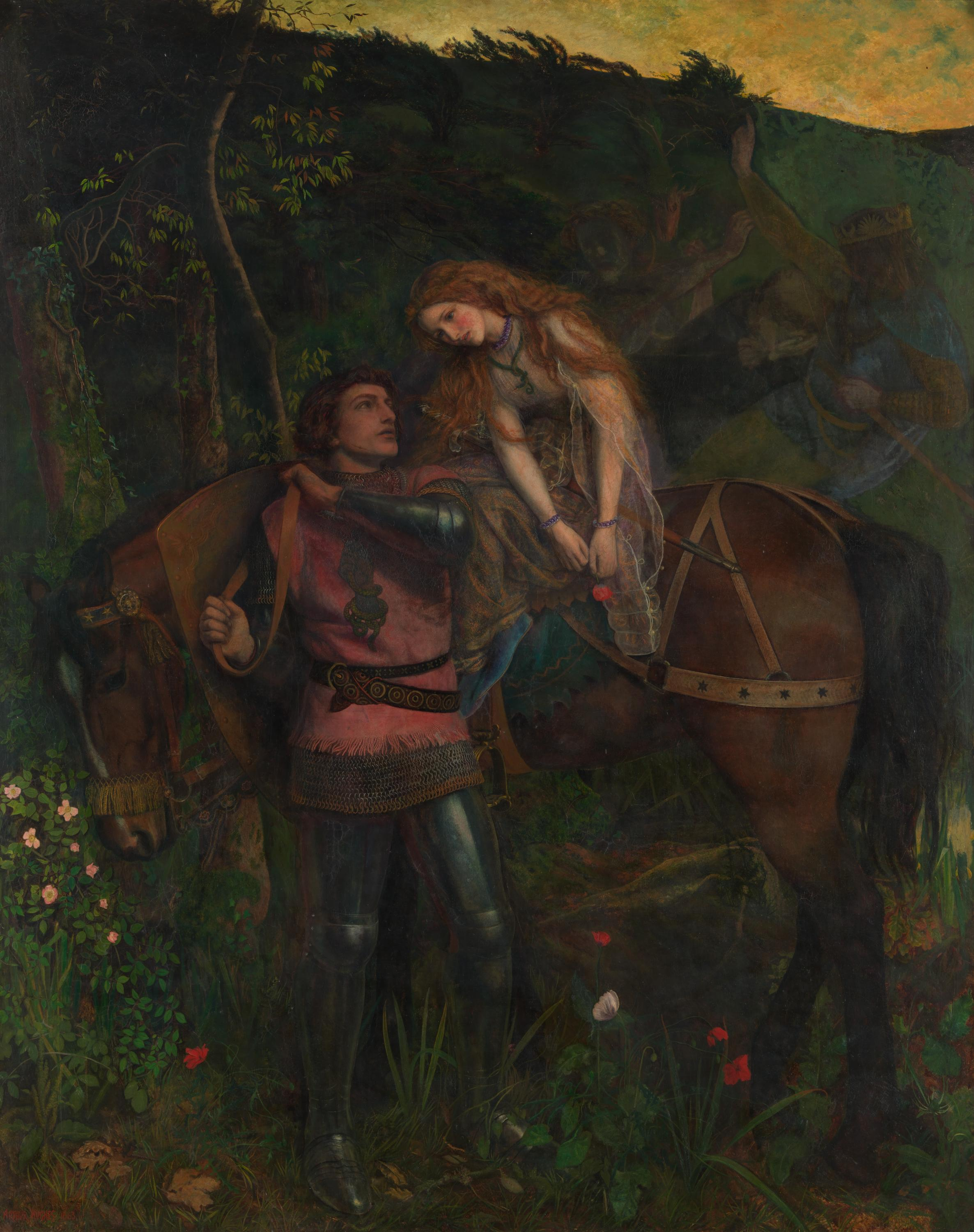
Arthur Hughes – La belle dame sans merci

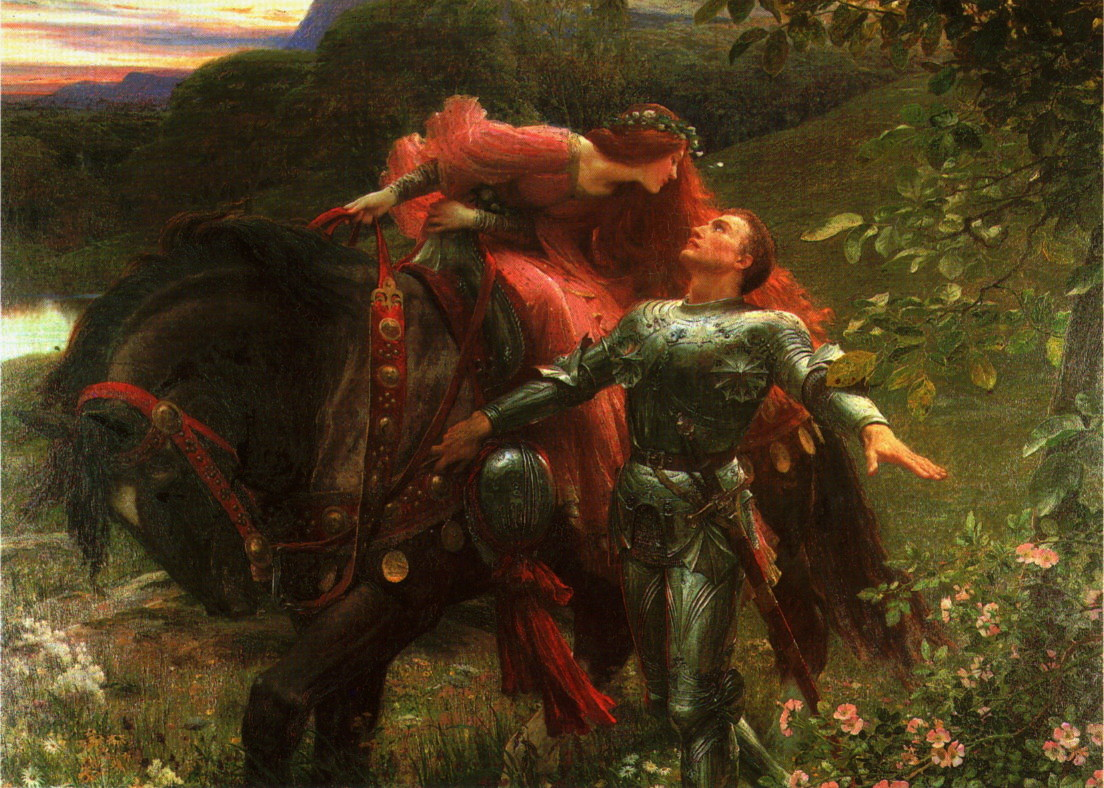
Frank Dicksee – La Belle Dame sans Merci, 1902

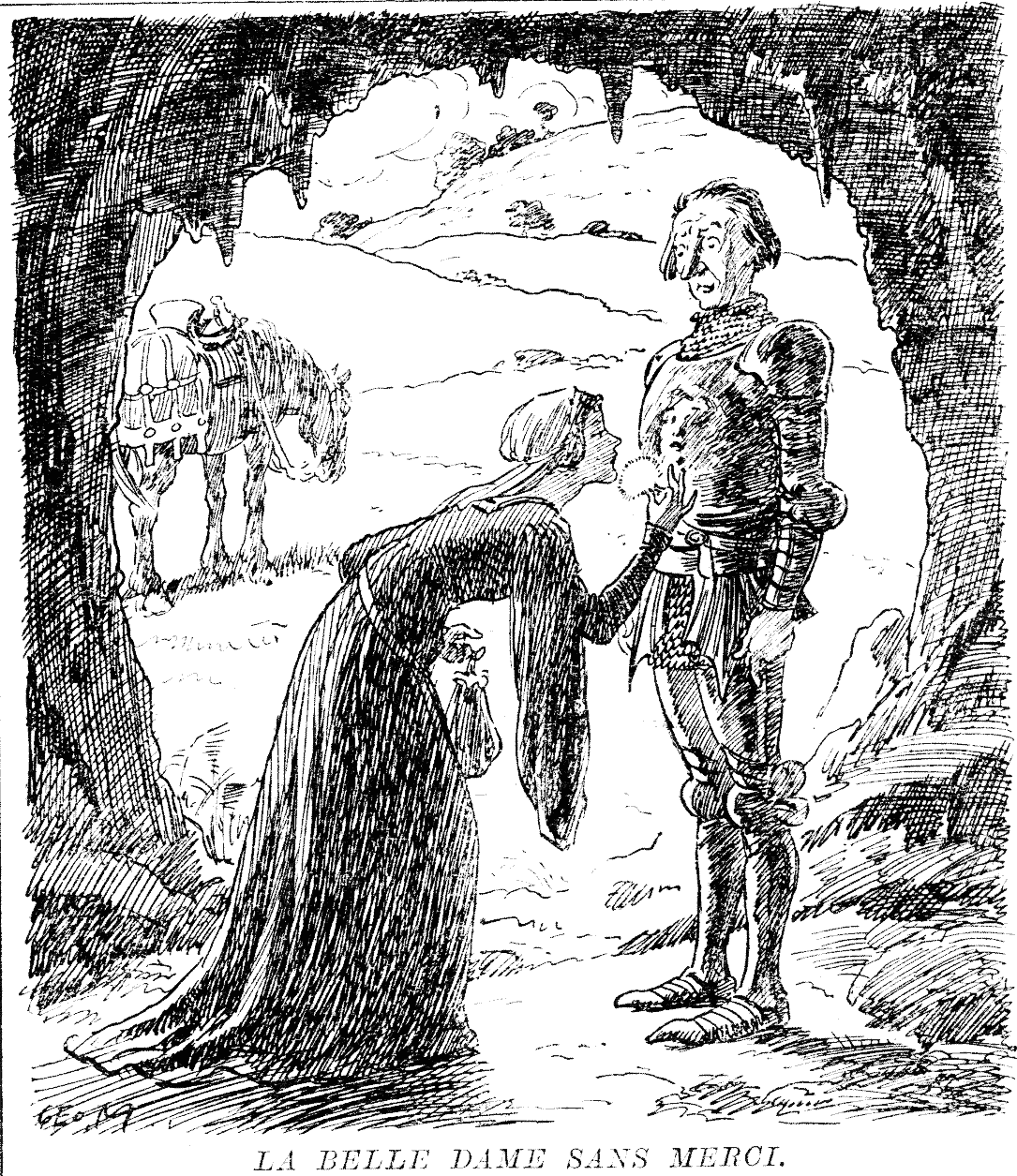
Punch magazine cartoon, 1920

"La Belle Dame sans Merci" ("The Beautiful Lady without Mercy") is a ballad produced by the English poet John Keats in 1819. The title was derived from the title of a 15th-century poem by Alain Chartier called La Belle Dame sans Merci.

Considered an English classic, the poem is an example of Keats' poetic preoccupation with love and death. The poem is about a fairy who condemns a knight to an unpleasant fate after she seduces him with her eyes and singing. The fairy inspired several artists to paint images that became early examples of 19th-century femme fatale iconography. The poem continues to be referred to in many works of literature, music, art, and film.

== Poem ==
The poem is simple in structure with twelve stanzas of four lines each in an ABCB rhyme scheme. Below are both the original and revised version(s) of the poem:

The original version, 1819

O what can ail thee, knight-at-arms,
Alone and palely loitering?
The sedge has withered from the lake,
And no birds sing!

O what can ail thee, knight-at-arms,
So haggard and so woe-begone?
The squirrel’s granary is full,
And the harvest’s done.

I see a lily on thy brow,
With anguish moist and fever-dew,
And on thy cheeks a fading rose
Fast withereth too.

I met a lady in the meads,
Full beautiful, a fairy's child;
Her hair was long, her foot was light,
And her eyes were wild.

I made a garland for her head,
And bracelets too, and fragrant zone;
She looked at me as she did love,
And made sweet moan.

I set her on my pacing steed,
And nothing else saw all day long,
For sidelong would she bend, and sing
A faery's song.

She found me roots of relish sweet,
And honey wild, and manna-dew,
And sure in language strange she said—
'I love thee true'.

She took me to her Elfin grot,
And there she wept and sighed full sore,
And there I shut her wild, wild eyes
With kisses four.

And there she lullèd me asleep,
And there I dreamed—Ah! woe betide!—
The latest dream I ever dreamt
On the cold hill side.

I saw pale kings and princes too,
Pale warriors, death-pale were they all;
They cried—'La Belle Dame sans Merci
Hath thee in thrall!'

I saw their starved lips in the gloam,
With horrid warning gapèd wide,
And I awoke and found me here,
On the cold hill's side.

And this is why I sojourn here,
Alone and palely loitering,
Though the sedge is withered from the lake,
And no birds sing.

Translation:
The revised version, 1820

Ah, what can ail thee, wretched wight,
Alone and palely loitering?
The sedge is wither'd from the lake,
And no birds sing.

Ah, what can ail thee, wretched wight,
So haggard and so woe-begone?
The squirrel's granary is full,
And the harvest's done.

I see a lily on thy brow,
With anguish moist and fever-dew,
And on thy cheek a fading rose
Fast withereth too.

I met a lady in the meads,
Full beautiful, a faery's child;
Her hair was long, her foot was light,
And her eyes were wild.

I set her on my pacing steed,
And nothing else saw all day long,
For sideways would she lean, and sing
A faery’s song.

I made a garland for her head,
And bracelets too, and fragrant zone;
She look'd at me as she did love,
And made sweet moan.

She found me roots of relish sweet,
And honey wild, and manna dew,
And sure in language strange she said.—
I love thee true.

She took me to her elfin grot,
And there she gaz'd and sighed deep,
And there I shut her wild sad eyes
So kiss'd to sleep.

And there we slumber'd on the moss,
And there I dream'd, ah woe betide!—
The latest dream I ever dream'd
On the cold hill side.

I saw pale kings, and princes too,
Pale warriors, death-pale were they all;
Who cry'd—'La Belle Dame sans Merci
Hath thee in thrall!'

I saw their starv'd lips in the gloam,
With horrid warning gaped wide,
And I awoke, and found me here,
On the cold hill’s side.

And this is why I sojourn here,
Alone and palely loitering,
Though the sedge is withered from the lake,
And no birds sing.

== First version ==
The first version occurs in a letter from Keats, written over the period 14 February to 3 May 1819 to his younger brother and sister-in-law, George and Georgiana Keats, who had emigrated to America. This contains a number of alterations to the poem, with Keats revising as he wrote. It is not introduced in any way, but at the end he proceeds to make fun of the poem by discussing playfully why there are four kisses instead of a score or seven.

== Inspiration ==
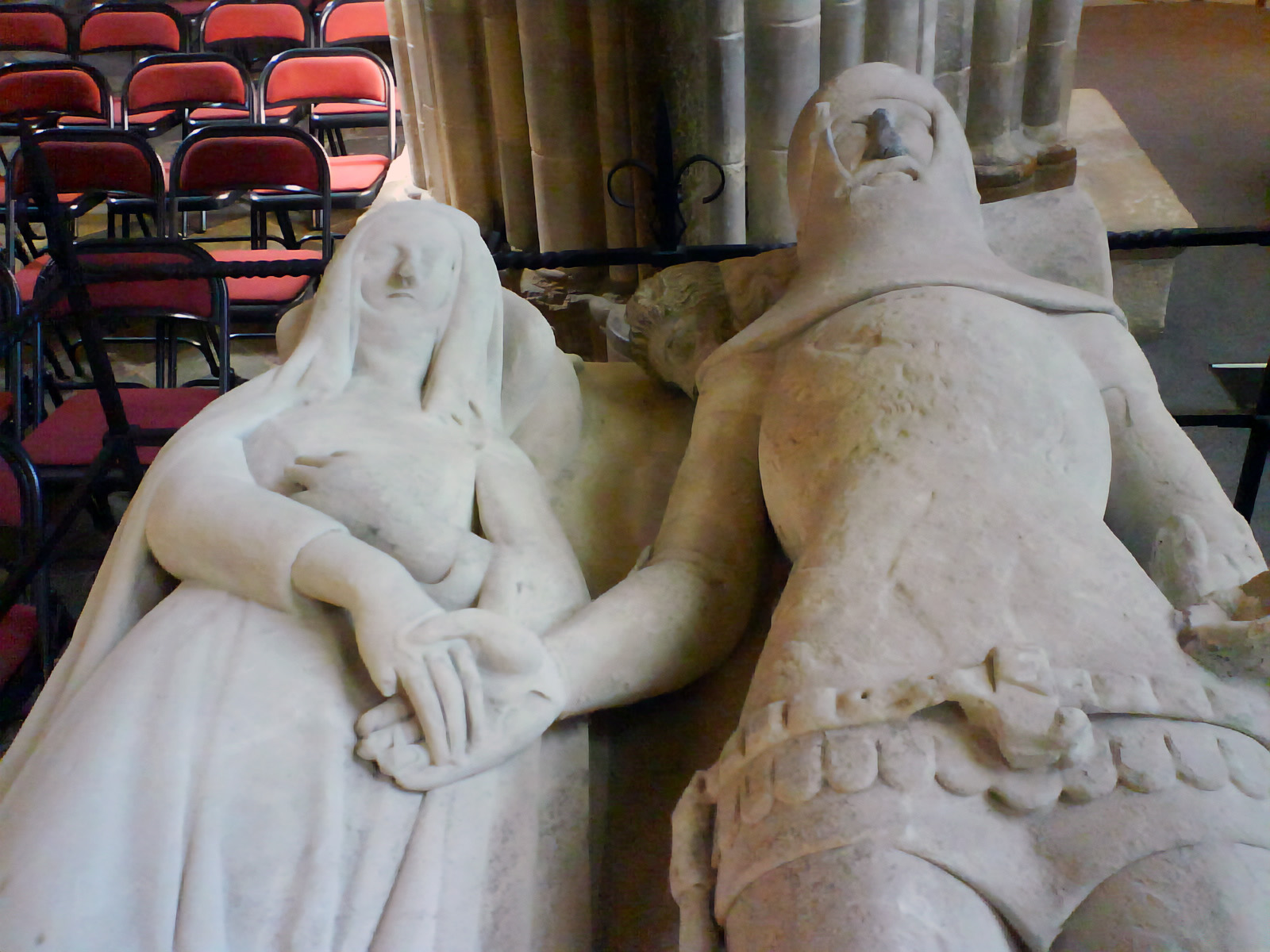
The memorial effigy of Richard Fitzalan and his second wife Eleanor of Lancaster in Chichester Cathedral

In 2019 literary scholars Richard Marggraf Turley and Jennifer Squire proposed that the ballad may have been inspired by the tomb effigy of Richard FitzAlan, 10th Earl of Arundel (d. 1376) in Chichester Cathedral. At the time of Keats' visit in 1819, the effigy stood mutilated and separated from that of Arundel's second wife, Eleanor of Lancaster (d. 1372), in the northern outer aisle. The figures were reunited and restored by Edward Richardson in 1843, and later inspired Philip Larkin's 1956 poem "An Arundel Tomb".

Like the author's other 1819 poems such as “Ode to a Nightingale,” “Ode on Melancholy,” and “Ode on Indolence,” the poem was written in the heat of Keats' passion for his fiancée Fanny Brawne. This is why some critics think that its theme partly reflects their relationship. However, critics such as Amy Lowell argue that "La Belle Dame sans Merci" is not biographical and that it is "not connected, except in the most general way, with Keats himself and Fanny Brawne.”

== In other media ==
=== Visual depictions ===
"La Belle Dame sans Merci" was a popular subject for the Pre-Raphaelite Brotherhood. It was depicted by Frank Dicksee, Frank Cadogan Cowper, John William Waterhouse, Arthur Hughes, Walter Crane, and Henry Maynell Rheam. It was also satirized in the 1 December 1920 edition of Punch magazine.

=== Musical settings ===
- Around 1910, Charles Villiers Stanford produced a musical setting for the poem. It is a dramatic interpretation requiring a skilled (male) vocalist and equally skilled accompanist. In the 21st century it remains popular and is included on many anthologies of English song or British Art Music recorded by famous artists.
- In 1935, Patrick Hadley wrote a version of the Stanford score for tenor, four-part chorus, and orchestra.
- Ukrainian composer Valentyn Silvestrov wrote a song for baritone and piano after Russian translation of the poem. It belongs to Silvestrov's song cycle Quiet Songs (Silent Songs) (1974–1975).
- The poem is set to music in two different versions entitled O What Can Ail Thee... on German Darkwave band © Printed At Bismarck's Death's 1993 EP Can Dance.
- A musical version of the poem, with music by Tom Drury and Brian Curran, appears on the 1995 self titled album by British group’s Heathens All.
- A setting of the poem, in German translation, appears on the 2009 music album Buch der Balladen by Faun.
- A lyrical, mystical musical setting of this poem has been composed by Loreena McKennitt, published in her 2018 CD Lost Souls.

=== Film ===
- The 1915 American film The Poet of the Peaks was based upon the poem.
- Germaine Dulac's 1920 La Belle Dame sans Merci explores the archetype of the femme fatale.
- Natassia Malthe stars as "The Lady" in Hidetoshi Oneda 2005 fantasy short of the same title.
- Ben Whishaw recites the poem in the 2009 Keats biopic Bright Star.

=== Books ===
- The poem is mentioned in the story entitled "The Adventure of the Three Gables" from the 1927 book The Case-Book of Sherlock Holmes by Sir Arthur Conan Doyle. In it Holmes compares and matches the character sketch of Isadora Klein with La Belle Dame sans Merci.
- In Agatha Christie's 1936 mystery novel Murder in Mesopotamia, the plot is centered upon an unusual woman named Louise Leidner who is described multiple times as "a kind of Belle Dame sin Merci". One character describes her as possessing a "calamitous magic that plays the devil with things".
- Vladimir Nabokov's books The Real Life of Sebastian Knight (1941), Lolita (1955) and Pale Fire (1962) allude to the poem.
- The last two lines of the first verse ("The sedge has withered from the lake/And no birds sing") were used as an epigraph for Rachel Carson's book Silent Spring (1962), about the environmental damage caused by the irresponsible use of pesticides. The second line was repeated later in the book, as the title of a chapter about their specific effects on birds.
- The last two lines of the 11th verse are used as the title of a science fiction short story, "And I awoke and found me here on the cold hill's side" (1973) by James Tiptree Jr.
- Roger Zelazny's Amber Chronicles refer to the poem in Chapter Five of The Courts of Chaos (1978) wherein the protagonist journeys to a land that resembles the poem.
- John Kennedy Toole's novel A Confederacy of Dunces (1980) alludes to the poem in initially describing the main character's home.
- Farley Mowat's 1980 memoir of his experiences in World War II is entitled And No Birds Sang.
- Pale Kings and Princes, a 1987 Spenser novel by Robert B. Parker, takes its title from the poem.
- The line is also featured in Philip Roth's The Human Stain (2000) in reaction to Coleman describing his new, far younger love interest.
- In Chapter 32 of Kristine Smith's novel Law Of Survival (2001) the protagonist, Jani, reveals her true hybrid eyes to the general public for the first time, then she asks another character, Niall, what she looks like. Niall smiles and quotes a snippet of La Belle Dame sans Merci and gives Keats credit for his words.
- The Beldam in Neil Gaiman's 2002 horror-fantasy novel Coraline refers to the mysterious woman who is also known as Belle Dame. Both share many similarities as both lure their protagonists into their lair by showing their love towards them and giving them treats to enjoy. The protagonists in both stories also encounter the ghosts who have previously met both women and warn the protagonist about their true colours and at the end of the story, the protagonist is stuck in their lair, with the exception of Coraline who managed to escape while the unnamed knight in this poem is still stuck in the mysterious fairy's lair.
- L. A. Meyer's Bloody Jack series (2002–2014) features a take on La Belle Dame sans Merci, adapted to reflect the protagonists age. Mary "Jacky" Faber became known as "La belle jeune fille sans merci".
- In Hunting Ground (2009) by Patricia Briggs, La Belle Dame sans Merci is identified as The Lady of the Lake and is a hidden antagonist.
- David Foster Wallace's 2011 novel The Pale King alludes to the poem in its title.
- Cassandra Clare's 2016 collection of novellas Tales From the Shadowhunter Academy includes a novella titled Pale Kings and Princes, named after the line "I saw pale kings and princes too/Pale warriors, death-pale were they all". Three of the poem's stanzas are also excerpted in the story.
- The last two lines of the first verse ("The sedge has withered from the lake/And no birds sing") are used in the text of the 2019 Nebula award-winning science fiction story This Is How You Lose the Time War by Amal El-Mohtar and Max Gladstone (2019).
- In the chapter Walpurgis Night of Thomas Mann's The Magic Mountain, Settembrini describes Claudia Chauchat behaving as a Belle Dame sans Merci.

=== Television ===
- Rumpole of the Bailey – Season 7, Episode 3
- Rosemary & Thyme – Season 1, Episode 1
- Californication – Season 1, Episode 5
- Downton Abbey – Season 6, Episode 5
- Victoria – Season 2, Episode 3
- Samurai Jack – "The Four Seasons of Death"'s final segment, based around Spring, has Jack being tempted to stay in the garden of a forest nymph for eternity, only for his drive to defeat Aku to be the thing that breaks him out of the daze and fight his way out of the nymph's vines.
- The theme of a woman seducing and sacrificing men to keep herself immortal are: Helen Of Troy (Kolchak: The Night Stalker); Queen Cleopatria/Pamela Morris "Queen of the Nile"; Unnamed Model "The Girl with the Hungary Eyes" (Rod Serling's "Night Gallery); Lady Die (Friday the 13th: The Series); Mary Beth (Freakazoid!); Mirror Queen (The Brothers Grimm); Pamela Dare (The Adventures of Superboy).
- Star Trek animated cartoon series "The Lorelei Signal" Kirk, Spock and McCoy are captured by beautiful femme fatales who use science to drain the lifeforce out of the male crewmen to remain young; "Favorite Son" (Star Trek: Voyager) Ensign Kim finds his life energy drained by an all female society; "Otherworld (TV series) episode ["Paradise Lost"] in which beautiful femme fatales who use science to drain the lifeforce out of males to remain young; "Ark II" 1976 [last episode] "Orkus" where the crew rapidly ages after encountering a group of Immortals.
- "The Quality of Mercy" [Babylon 5] a wounded insane serial killer named Karl Mueller tried to force a terminally ill physician to use an alien healing device to heal him or he would harm her and her daughter; the physician used the device to transfer her disease to him and then used it to drain his life energy from him until he literally dropped dead. A 1990 comic movie (Based on Twilight Zone "Queen of the Nile") had a vain woman using and sacrificing dozens of willing men to maintain her beauty until to her shock and horror one man refuses her..and she becomes older!
- It has also been suggested that there is a strong similarity with the plot of Monty Python's Seduced Milkmen sketch.

=== Other ===
In a March 2017 interview with The Quietus the English songwriter and musician John Lydon cited the poem as a favourite.

In the popular trading card game, Magic: The Gathering, the card "Merieke Ri Berit" is modelled after this poem.
