= Henry Meynell Rheam =

English painter

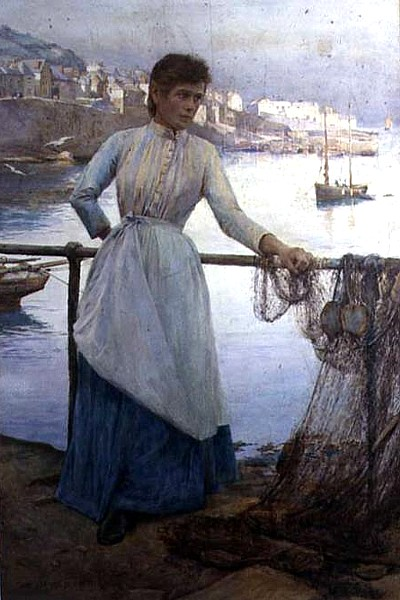
- Girl In Blue
- Born: 13 January 1859; Birkenhead, Cheshire, England
- Died: 1920 (aged 60–61); Penzance, Cornwall, England
- Education: Académie Julian
- Occupation: Painter

Henry Meynell Rheam (13 January 1859 – 1920) was a painter from England.

Rheam was born in Birkenhead and studied in Germany and at the Académie Julian in Paris before settling in Newlyn and associating with the Newlyn School. He is known for his late Pre-Raphaelite paintings. The Girl in Blue artist model was Bessie Paul. Rheam died in Penzance, England.

== Gallery ==
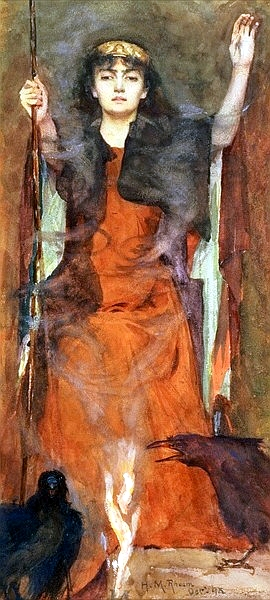
The Sorceress, 1898

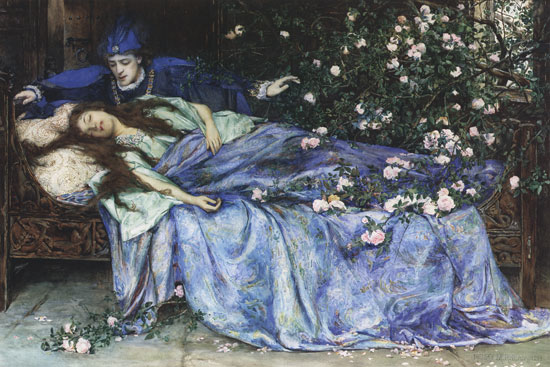
Sleeping Beauty, 1899

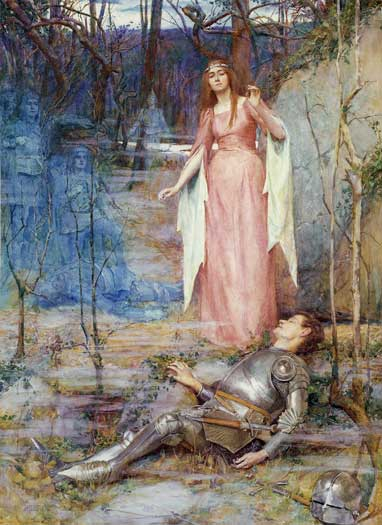
La Belle Dame sans Merci, 1901

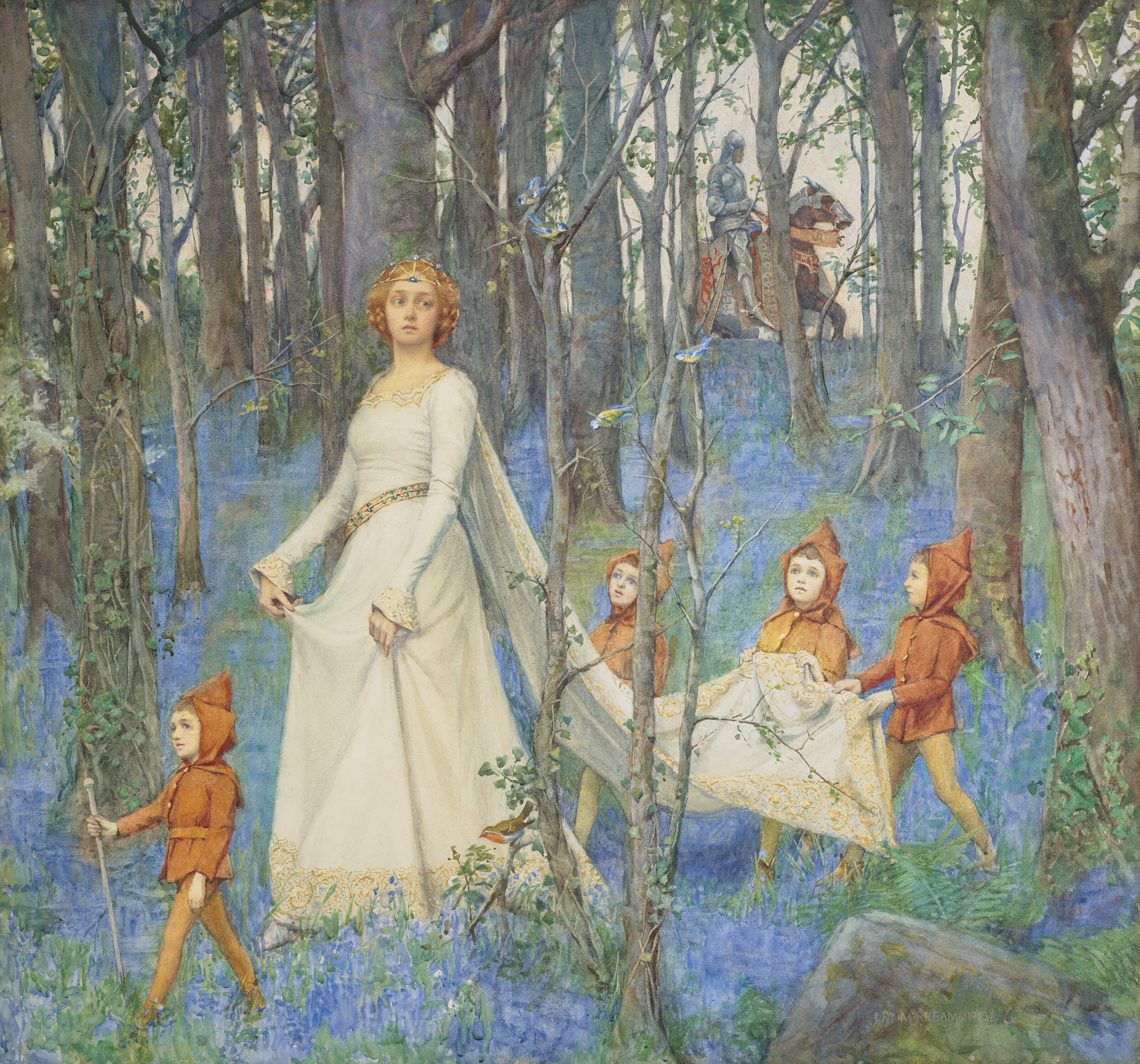
The Fairy Woods, 1903

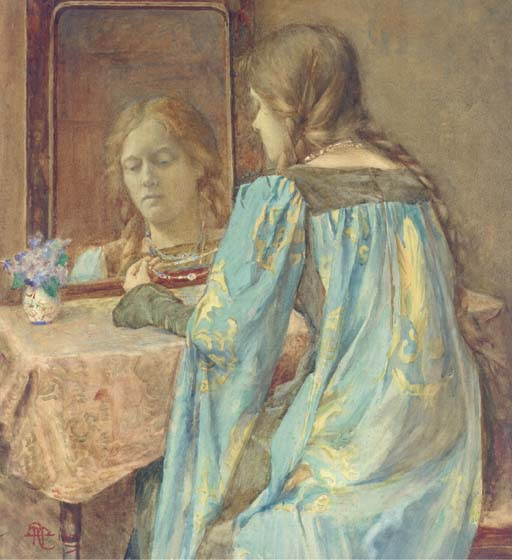
Lady in Medieval Dress, 1907

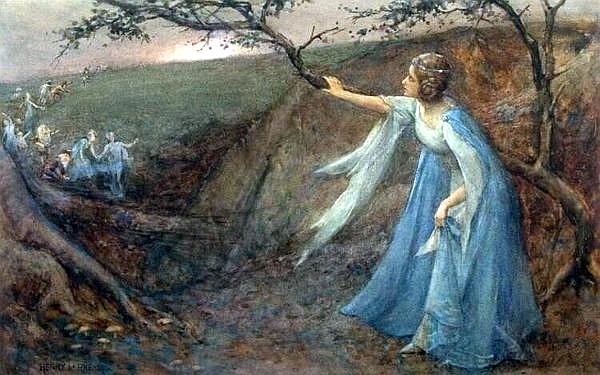
Titania

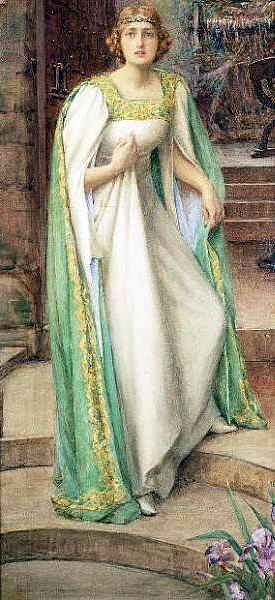
The Lady of Shalott
