= The Two Crowns =

Painting by Frank Dicksee

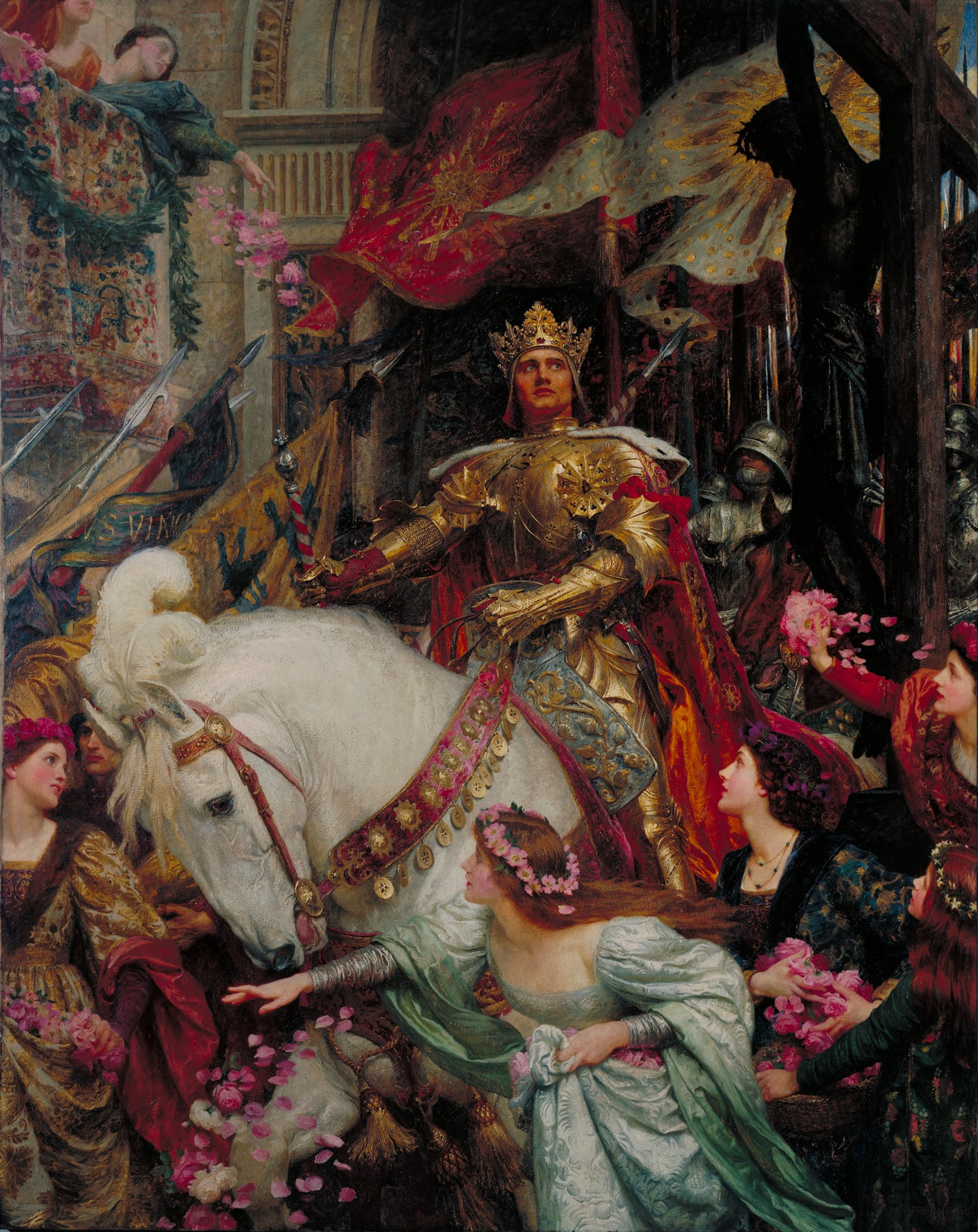
- Artist: Frank Dicksee

The Two Crowns is a painting by Frank Dicksee.

== Description ==
The subject of the painting is a king riding upon a white horse. He is in full armor and is wearing a crown of gold. Around him are several women, throwing roses. The king looks anxiously towards a large bronze crucifix on the corner, upon which Jesus is wearing a crown of thorns.

== Critical reception ==
Art critic Harry Quilter described it as "vulgar" and based upon a "false idea of art", albeit "solidly painted".
