= La Belle Dame sans Merci (Dicksee) =

Painting by Frank Dicksee

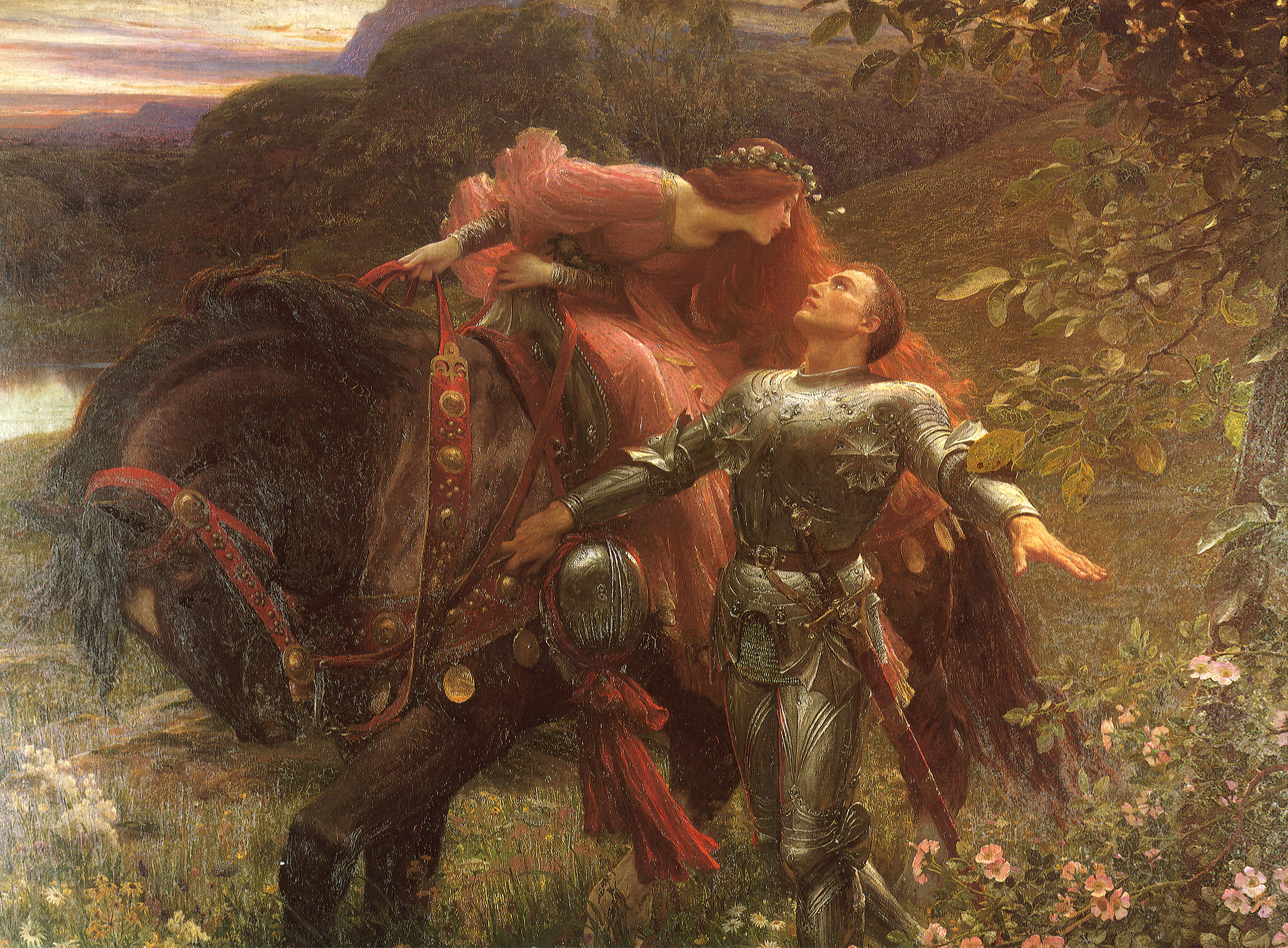
- Artist: Frank Dicksee
- Year: 1902
- Type: Oil on canvas, history painting
- Dimensions: 137.2 cm × 188 cm (54.0 in × 74 in)
- Location: City Museum and Art Gallery, Bristol

La Belle Dame sans Merci is a 1902 oil painting by the British artist Frank Dicksee. It depicts a virtuous knight ensared by an enchantress. The painting is based on the 1819 ballad La Belle Dame sans Merci by the Romantic poet John Keats which had inspired paintings by several artists including Dicksee's contemporary John William Waterhouse. Dicksee had himself been influenced by an 1896 painting by George Spencer Watson.

This was one or his last major narrative paintings before he switched increasing to portraits during the Edwardian era. In 1924 Dicksee was elected President of the Royal Academy, a position he held until 1928.

The painting was displayed at the Royal Academy Exhibition of 1902 held at Burlington House in London and at the St. Louis International Exhibition in 1904. It was acquired by Bristol Art Gallery in 1913.

== Bibliography ==
- Toll, Simon. Frank Dicksee, 1853-1928: His Art and Life. ACC Art Books, 2016.
