= Thomas Francis Dicksee =

British artist

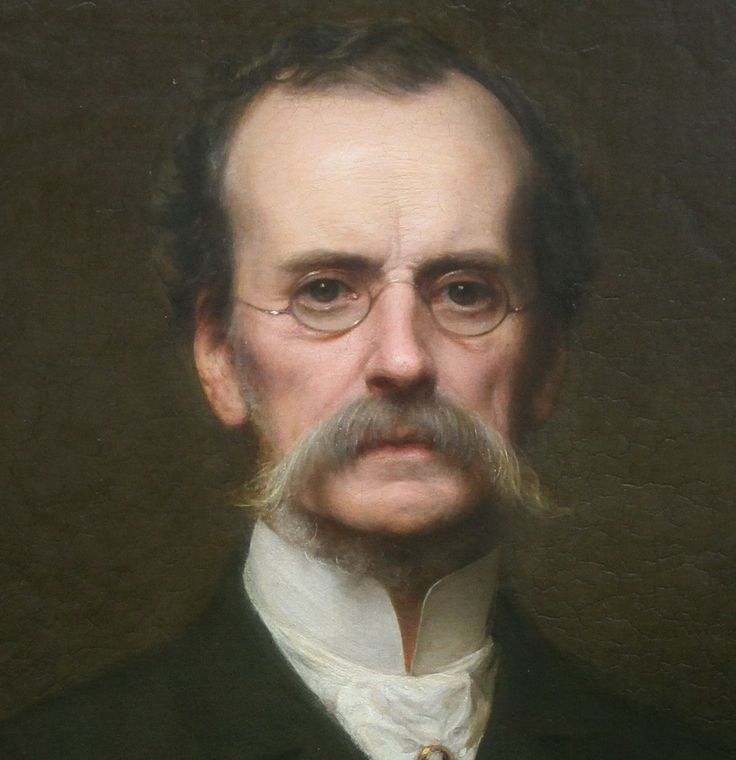
- Thomas Francis Dicksee, self-portrait, date unknown
- Born: 13 December 1819; London, England
- Died: 6 November 1895 (aged 75); London, England
- Education: H. P. Briggs.

Thomas Francis Dicksee (1819–1895) was a British painter. He was a portraitist but is best known as a painter of historical genre subjects, most often single imaginary "portraits" of young women from literature or history, many from the works of Shakespeare.

Dicksee belonged to an illustrious artistic family. His brother was the artist John Dicksee (1817–1905), whose son was Herbert Dicksee, who often painted dogs. Thomas's son was Sir Frank Dicksee (1853–1928), president of the Royal Academy from 1924 until his death. He painted somewhat similar subjects to his father, but with a wider range and more flamboyant treatment; medieval figure subjects were a speciality. Thomas's daughter Margaret Isabel Dicksee also painted in a similar vein, with more sentimental subjects usually of women and children.

== Life and career ==
Thomas Francis Dicksee was born in London on 13 December 1819 and was the pupil of H. P. Briggs. He exhibited at the Royal Academy from 1841 until the year of his death.

He produced a series of portraits of family members, and also painted idealised portraits, including the Shakespearean characters Ophelia, Beatrice, Miranda and Ariel. A Juliet is in the Sunderland Art Gallery, and At the Opera is in the collection of Leicester Art Gallery. A portrait of Lady Teasdale is in the Adelaide Art Gallery, Australia and an Ophelia (1875) is in the Mead Art Museum, Amherst, Massachusetts. Dicksee would become particularly well known for his depictions of Shakespearean heroines and exhibited a total of seven at the Royal Academy. Other oil paintings have been seen in several auctions including Christ of the Cornfield, Distant Thoughts, and paintings of Beatrice, Miranda, and Amy Robsart. He died in London on 6 November 1895.

He lived in Fitzroy Square, Bloomsbury.

== Gallery ==
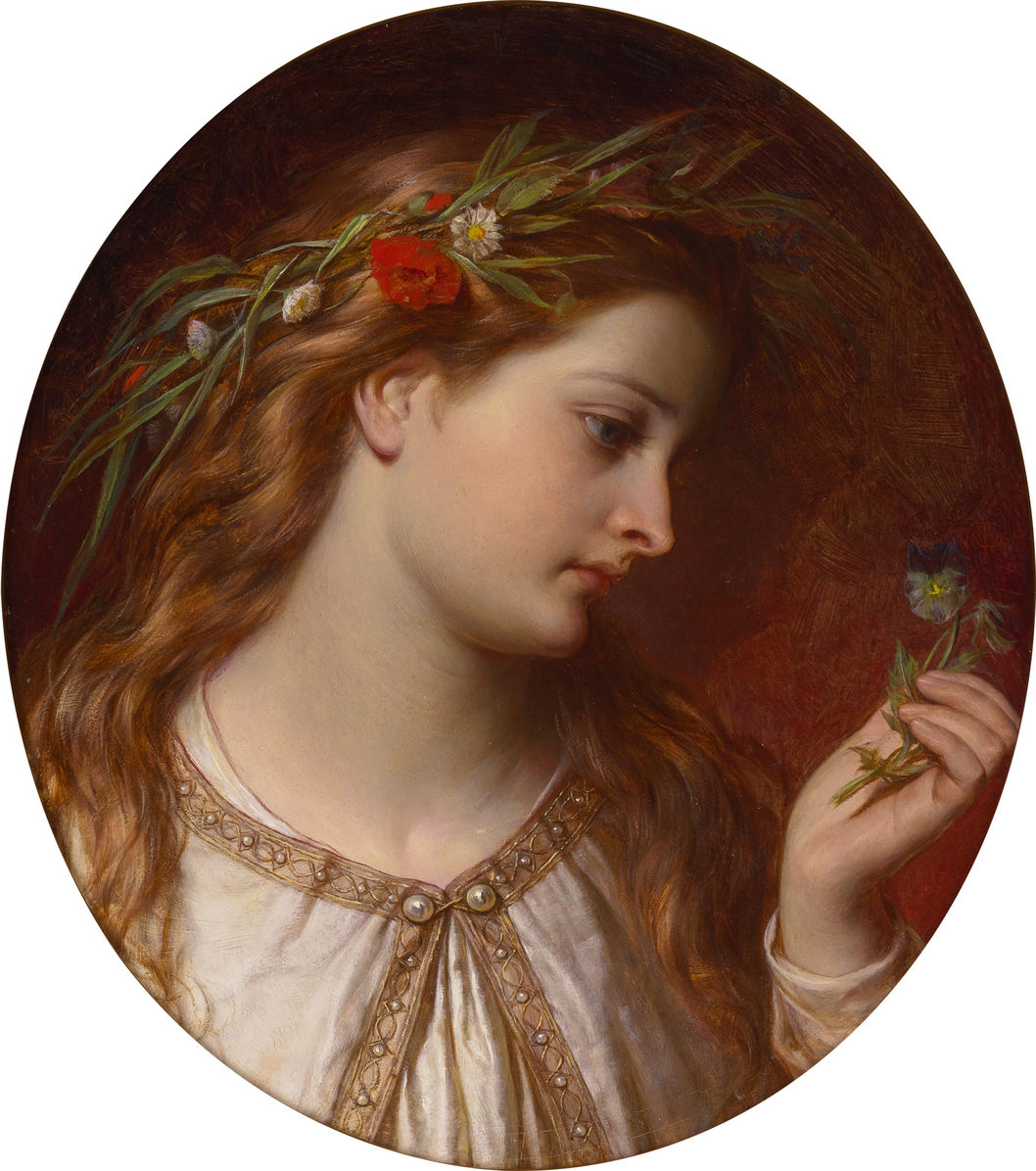
Ophelia, 1865

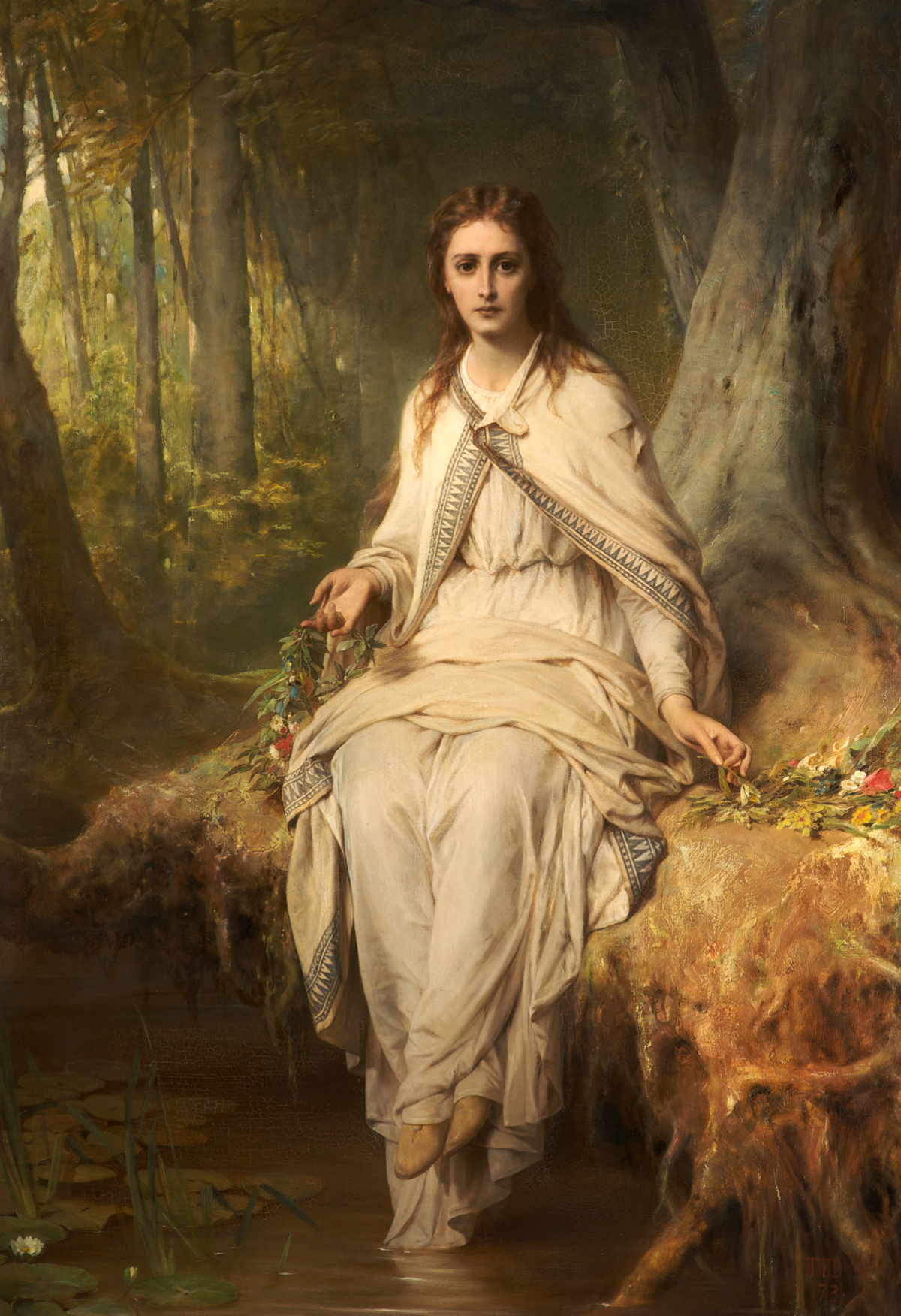
Ophelia, 1873, Touchstones Rochdale, England

Juliet on the Balcony, 1875, McManus Galleries, Dundee, Scotland

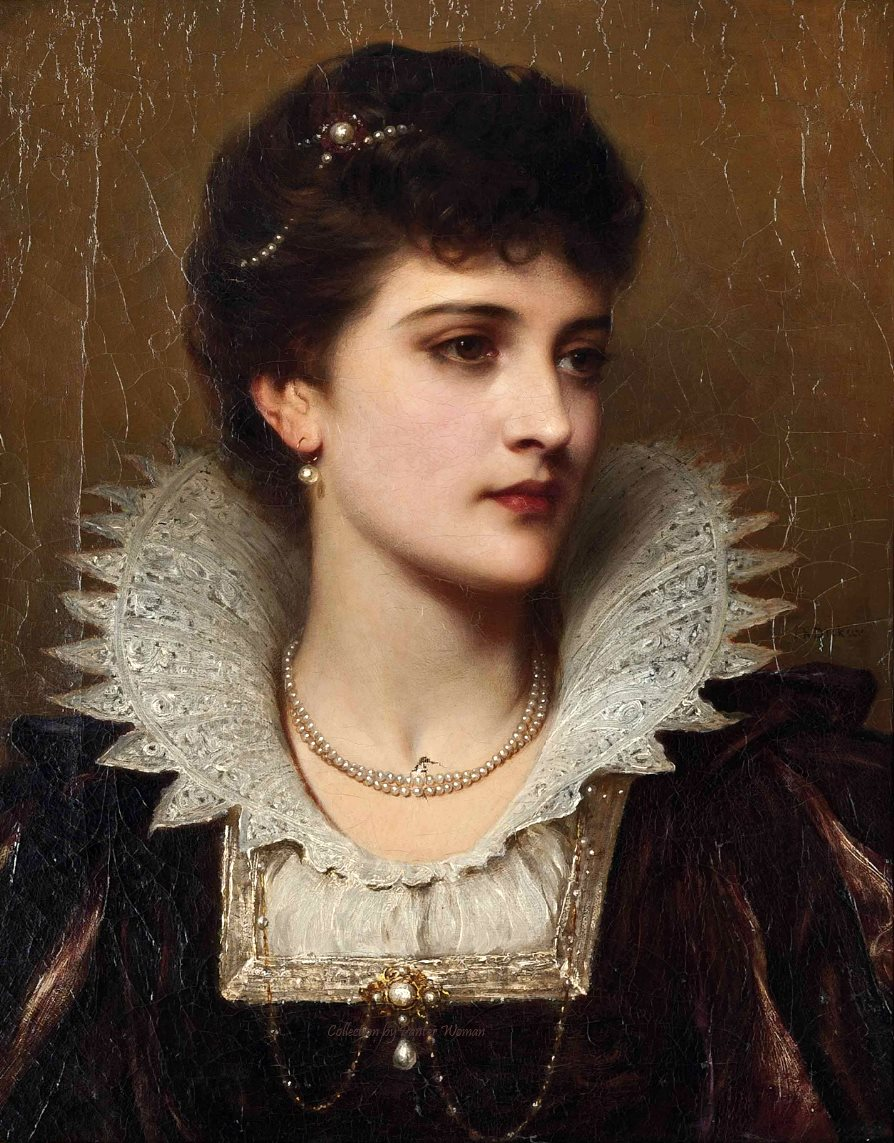
Amy Robsart

Juliet, 1877, Sunderland Museum and Winter Gardens, Sunderland, England

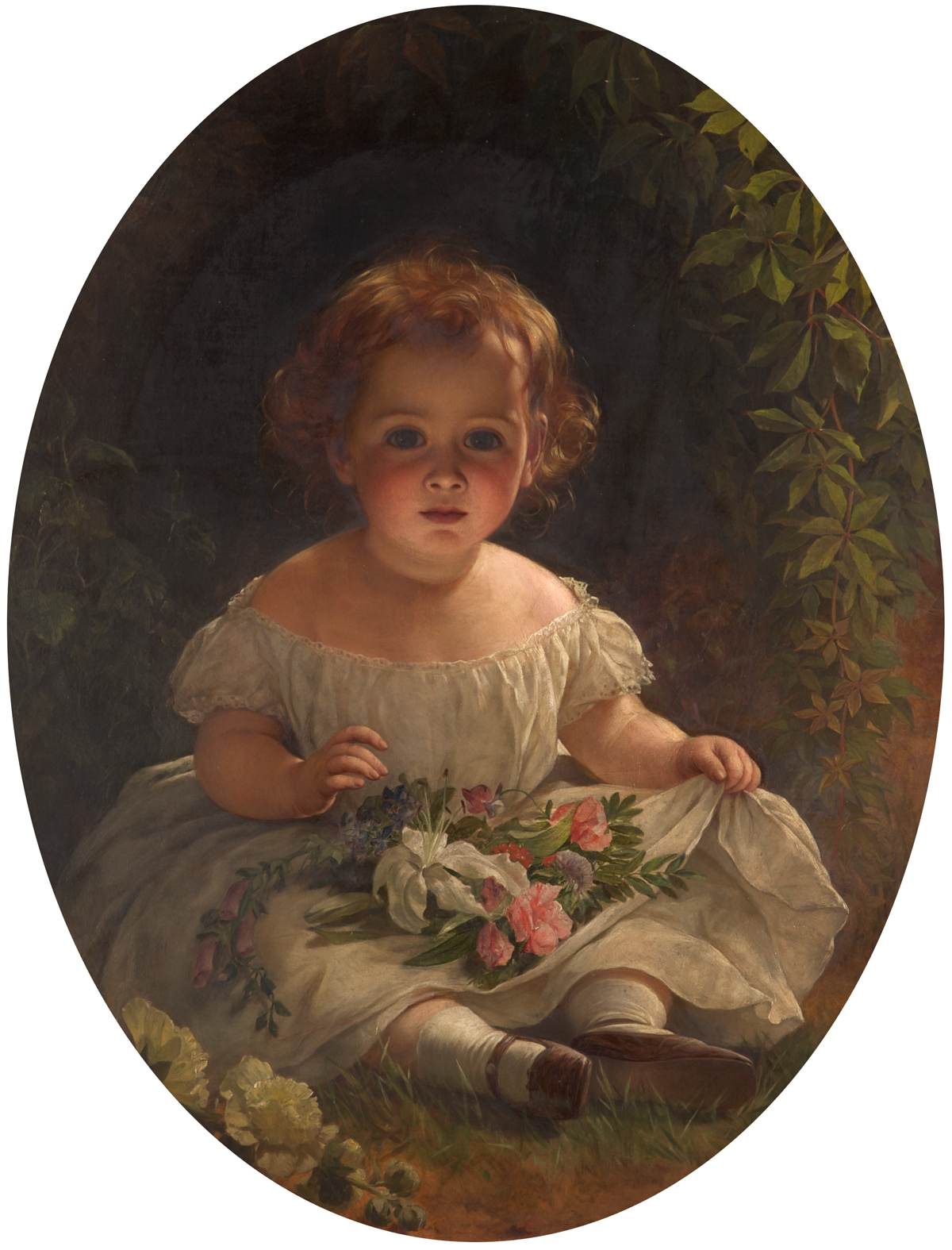
Little Florist, Gallery Oldham, Greater Manchester, England

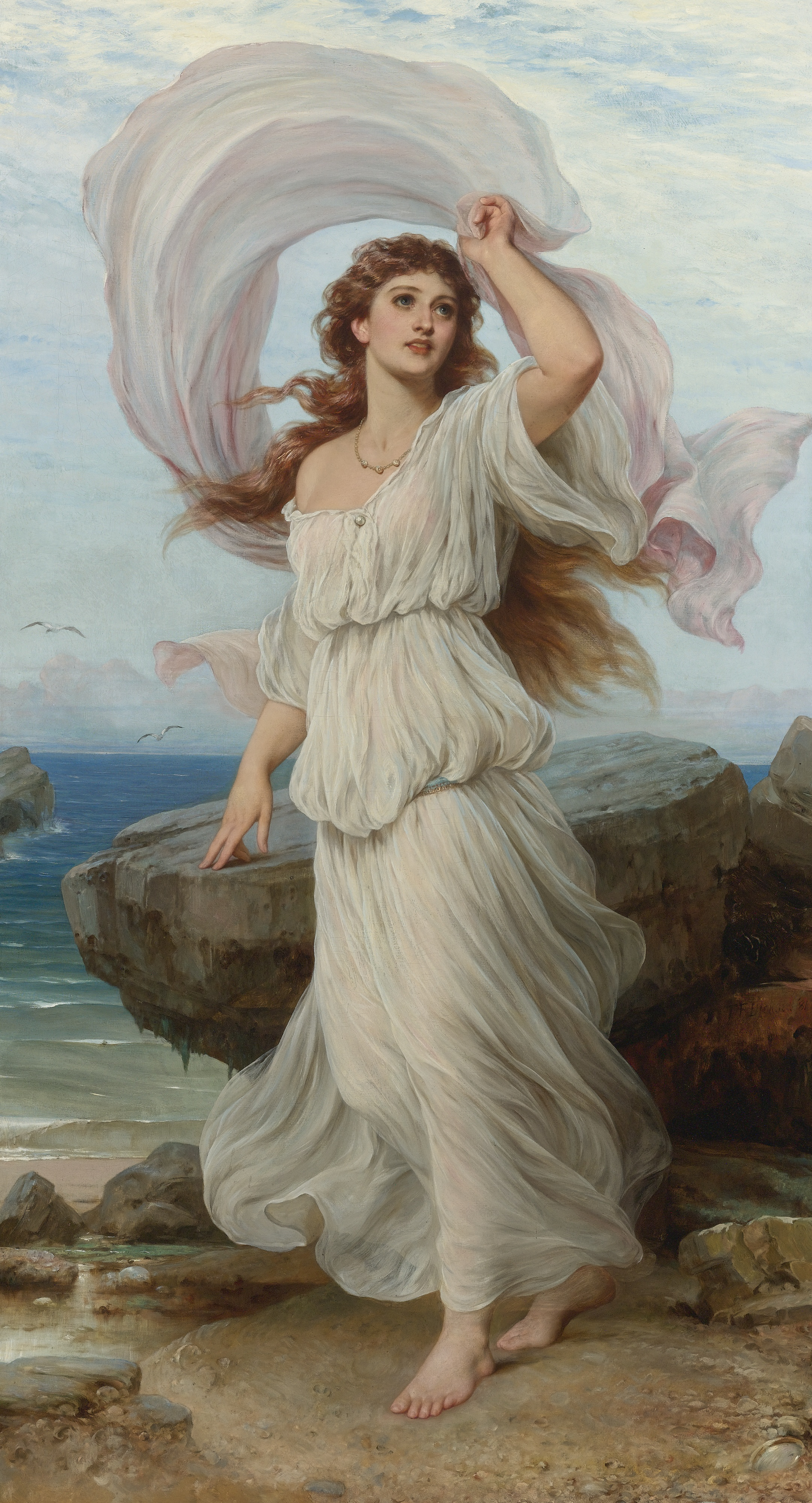
Miranda,1895, auction sold at Sotheby's
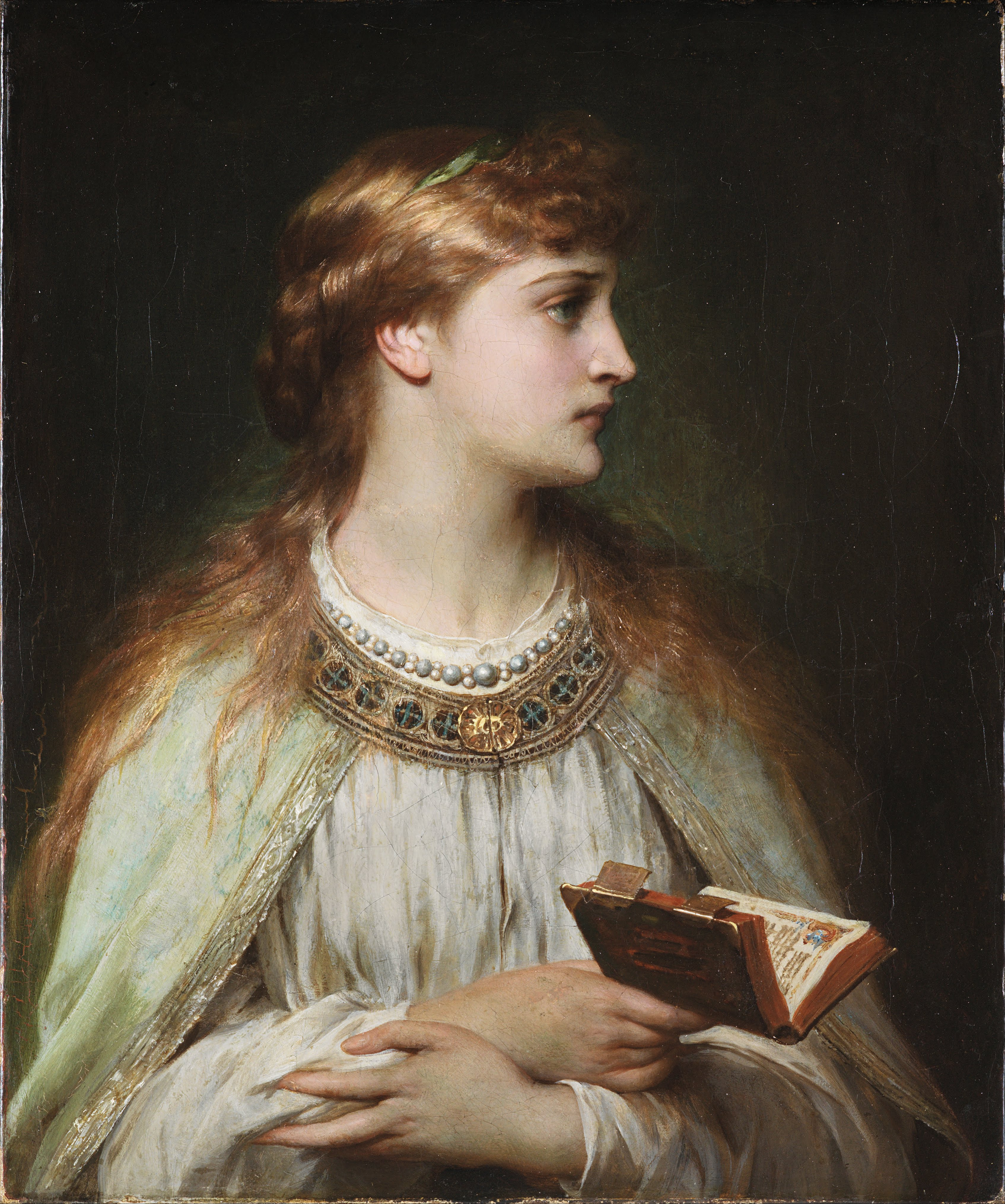
Ophelia,1864, Bilbao Fine Arts Museum, Spain

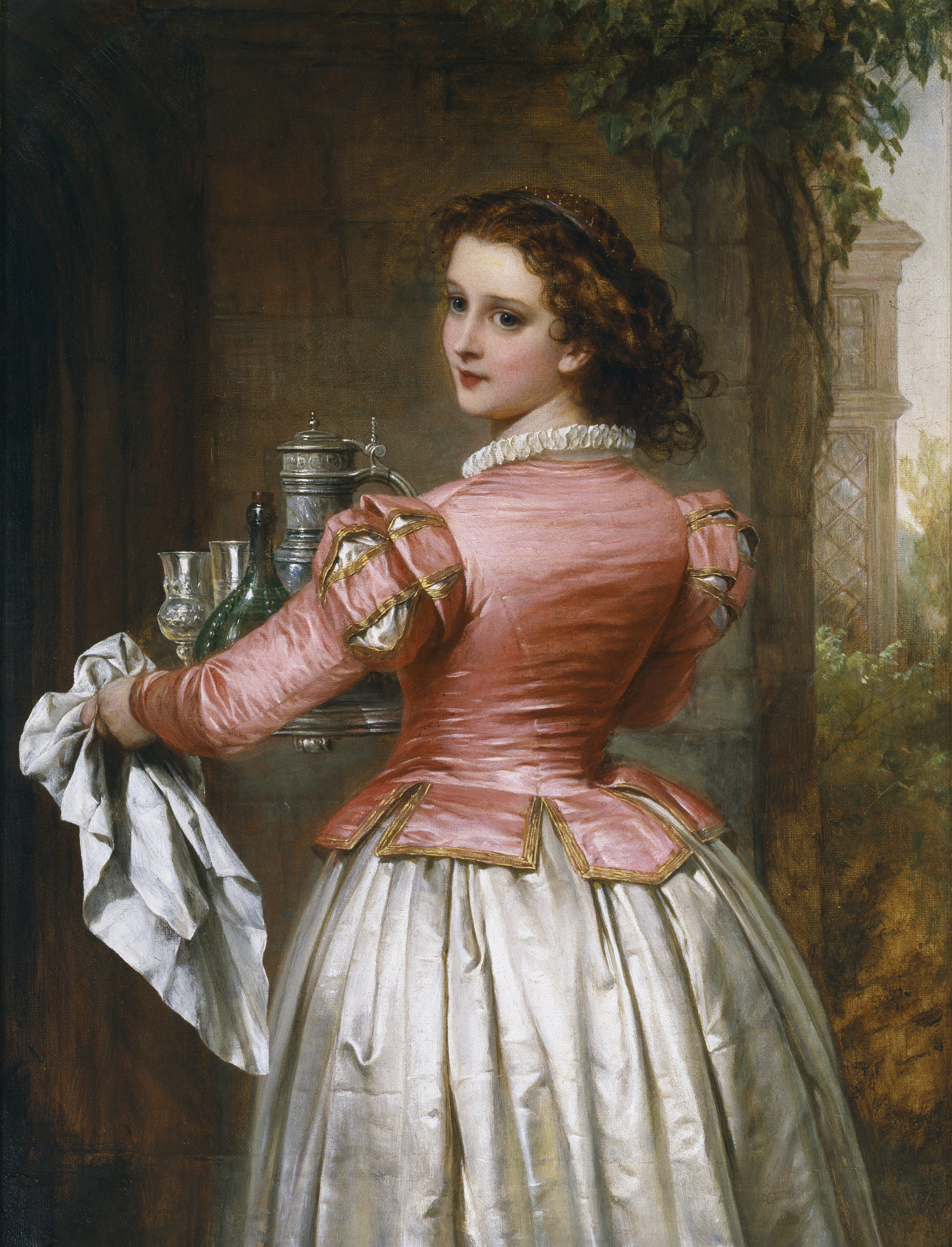
Anne Page, 1862, Folger Shakespeare Library, Washington, D.C.

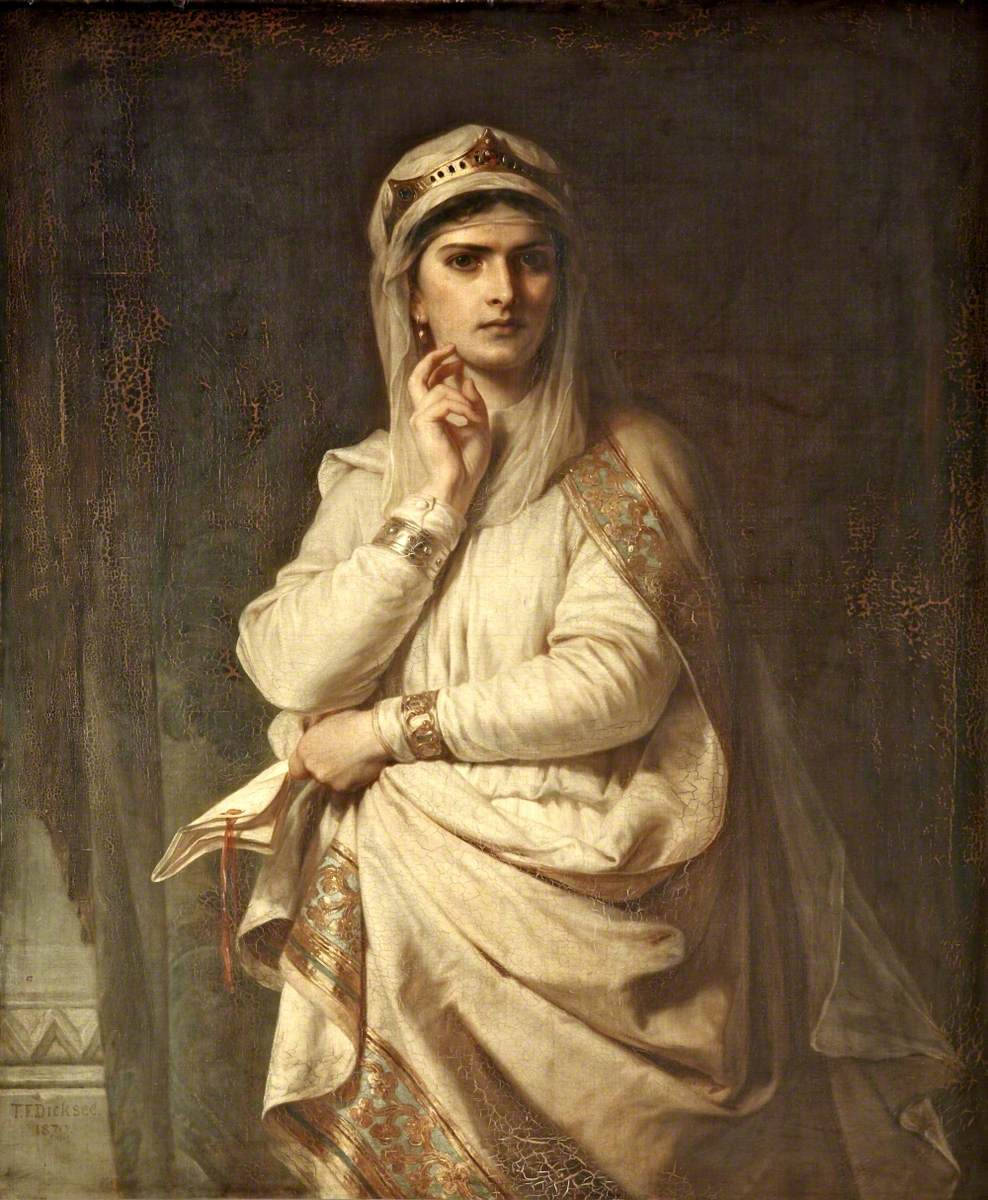
Ideal Portrait of Lady Macbeth, 1870, Walker Art Gallery, Liverpool, England

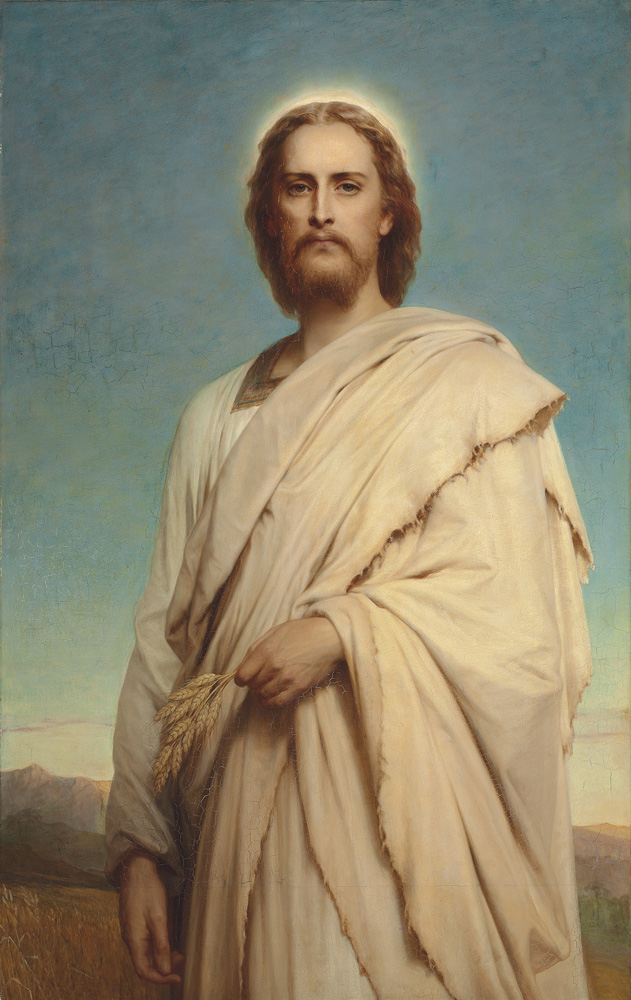
Christ of the Cornfield, 1883

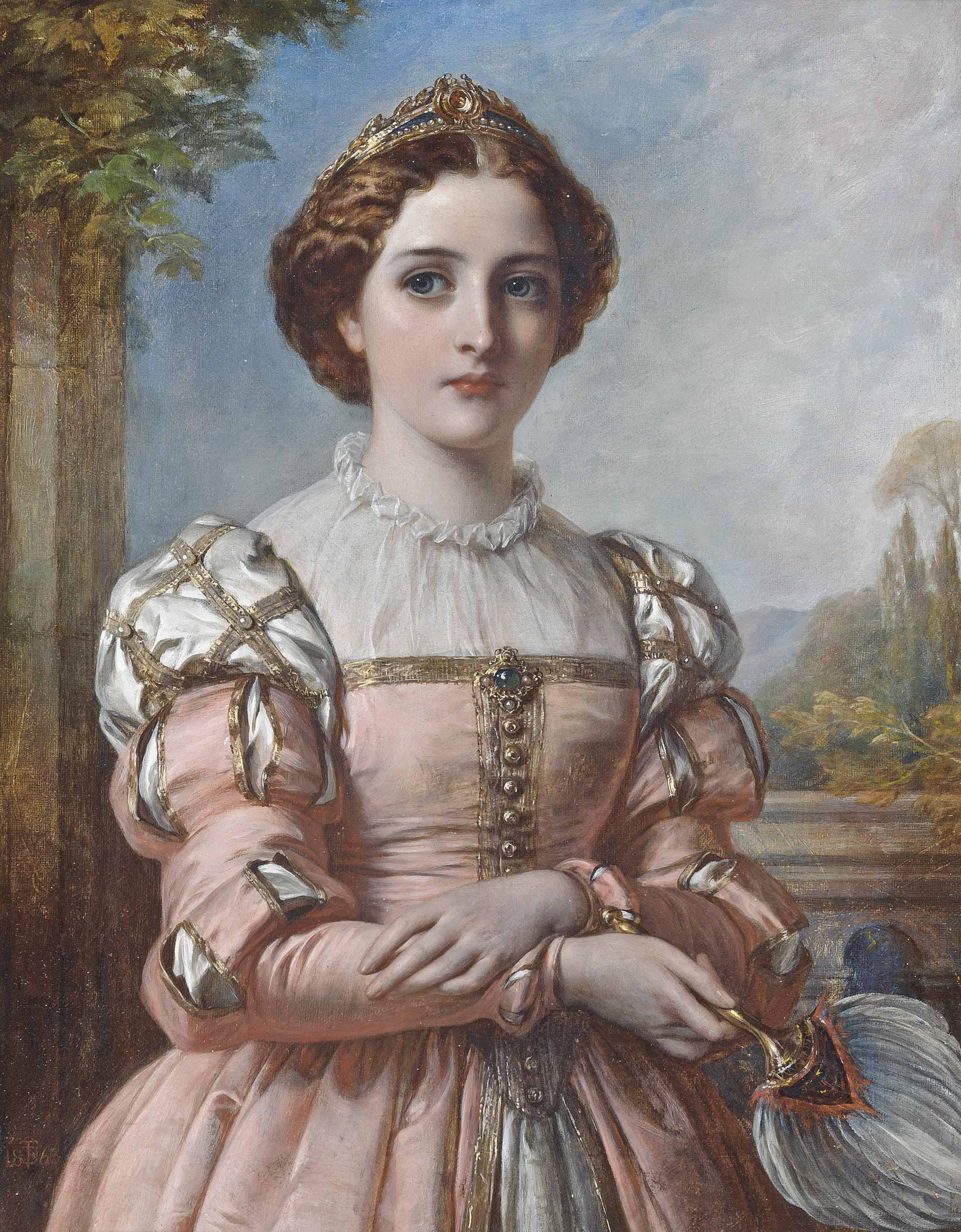
Beatrice, 1883
