= Frank Dicksee =

English Victorian painter and illustrator (1853–1928)

Sir Frank Dicksee KCVO PRA
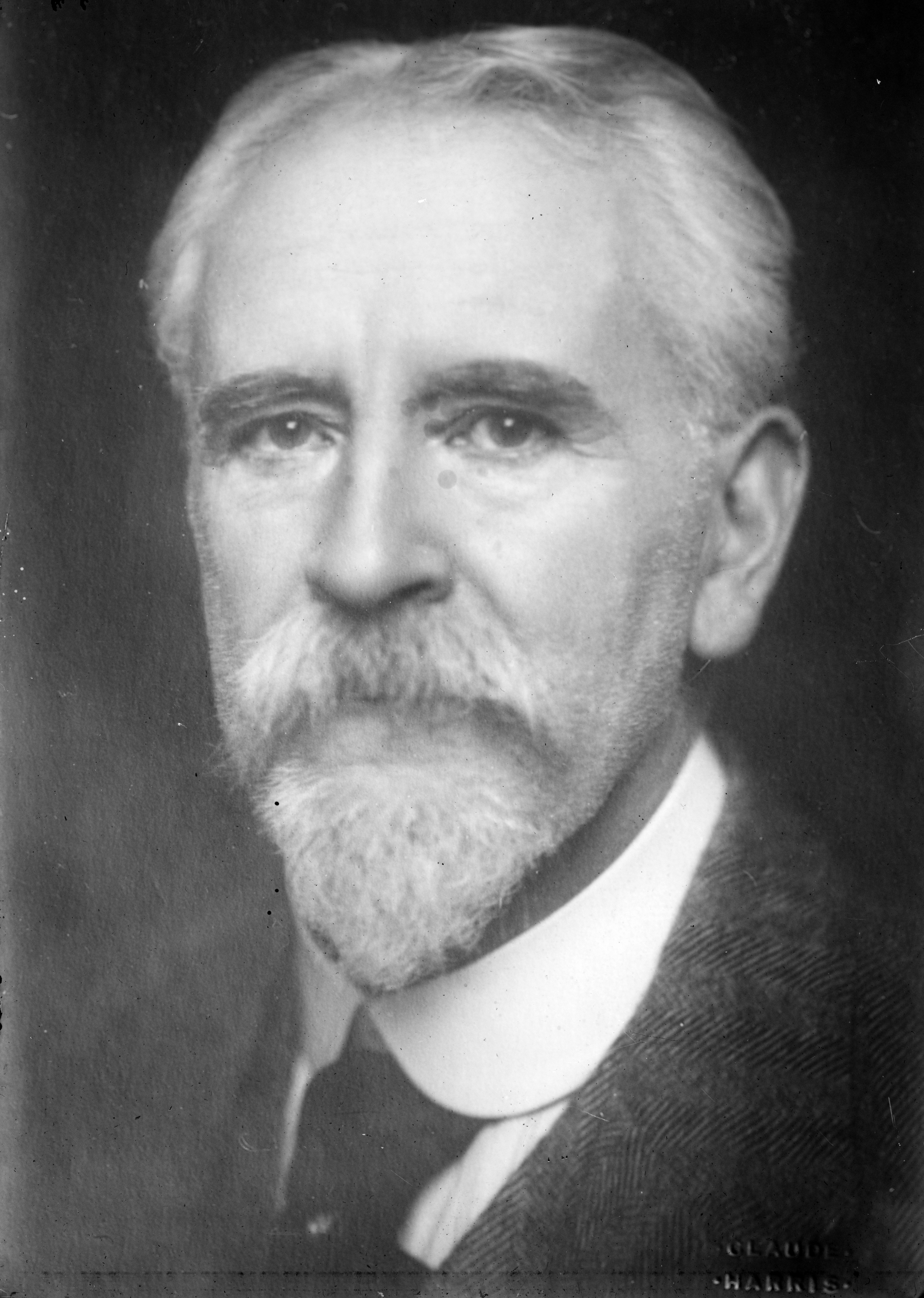
- Frank Bernard Dicksee
- Born: 27 November 1853; London, England, UK
- Died: 17 October 1928 (aged 74); London, England, UK

Sir Francis Bernard Dicksee KCVO PRA (27 November 1853 – 17 October 1928) was an English Victorian painter and illustrator, best known for his pictures of dramatic literary, historical, and legendary scenes. He also was a noted painter of portraits of fashionable women, which helped to bring him success in his own time.

== Life ==
Dicksee's father, Thomas Dicksee, was a painter who taught Frank as well as his sister Margaret from a young age. The family lived in Fitzroy Square, Bloomsbury. Dicksee enrolled in the Royal Academy Schools in 1870 and achieved early success. He was elected to the academy in 1891 and became its president in 1924.

He was knighted in 1925, and appointed a Knight Commander of the Royal Victorian Order (KCVO) by King George V in the 1927 Birthday Honours. In 1921 Dicksee exhibited at the first exhibition of the Society of Graphic Art in London.

Dicksee painted The Funeral of a Viking (1893; Manchester Art Gallery), which was donated in 1928 by Arthur Burton in memory of his mother to the Corporation of Manchester. Victorian critics gave it both positive and negative reviews, for its perfection as a showpiece and for its dramatic and somewhat staged setting, respectively. The painting was used by Swedish Viking/Black metal band Bathory for the cover of their 1990 album, Hammerheart.

A book on Frank Dicksee's life and work with a full catalogue of his known paintings and drawings by Simon Toll was published by Antique Collector's Club in 2016.

== Gallery ==
Frank Dicksee's works

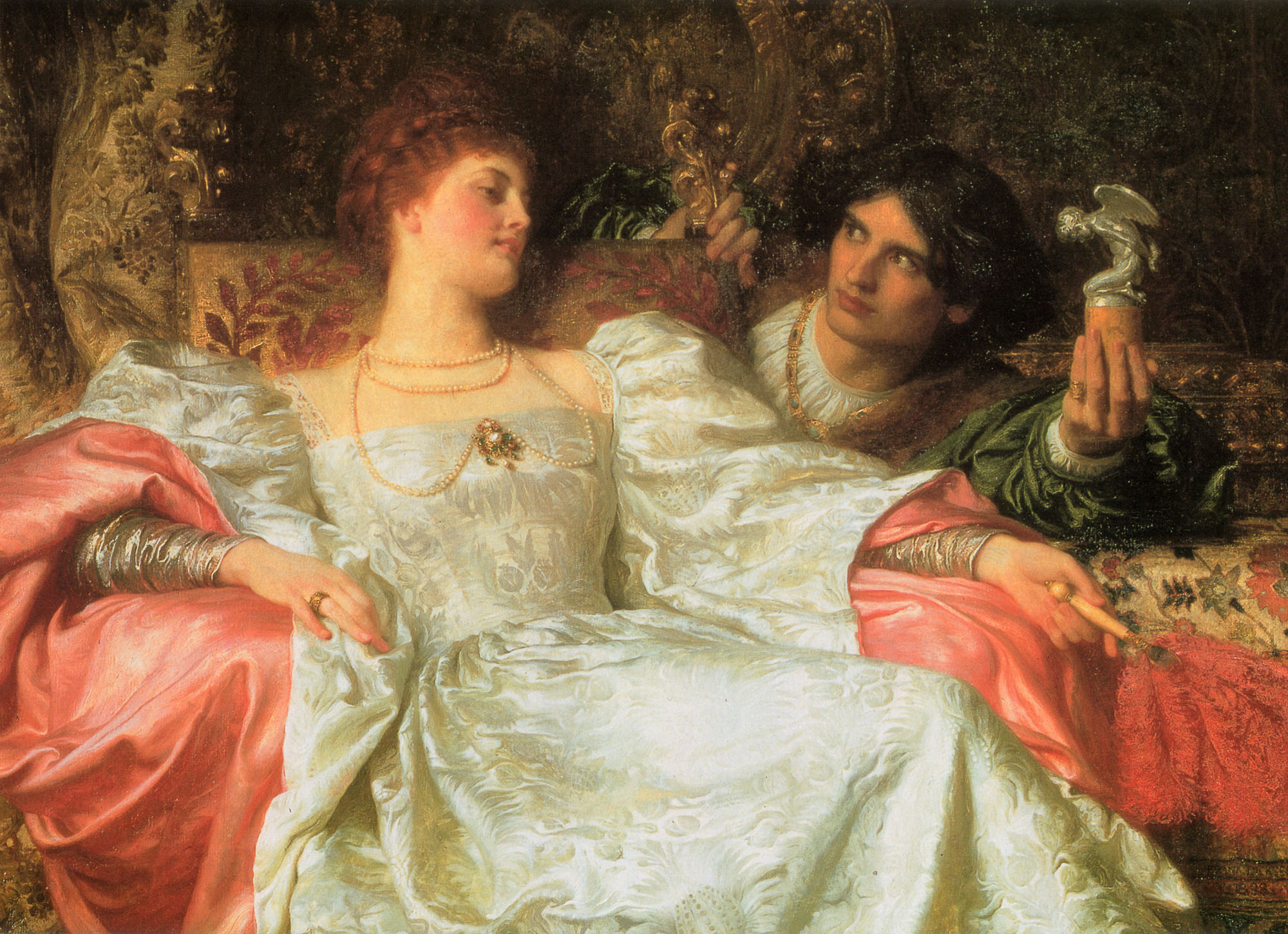
An Offering

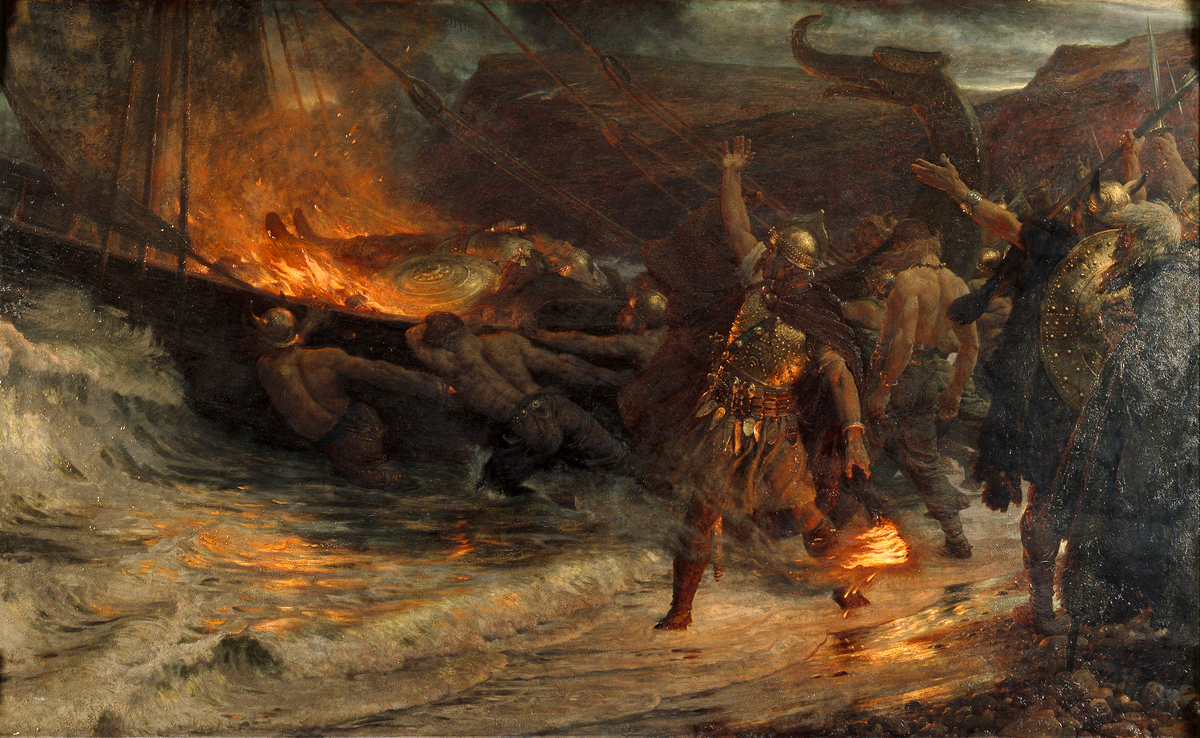
The Funeral of a Viking, 1893

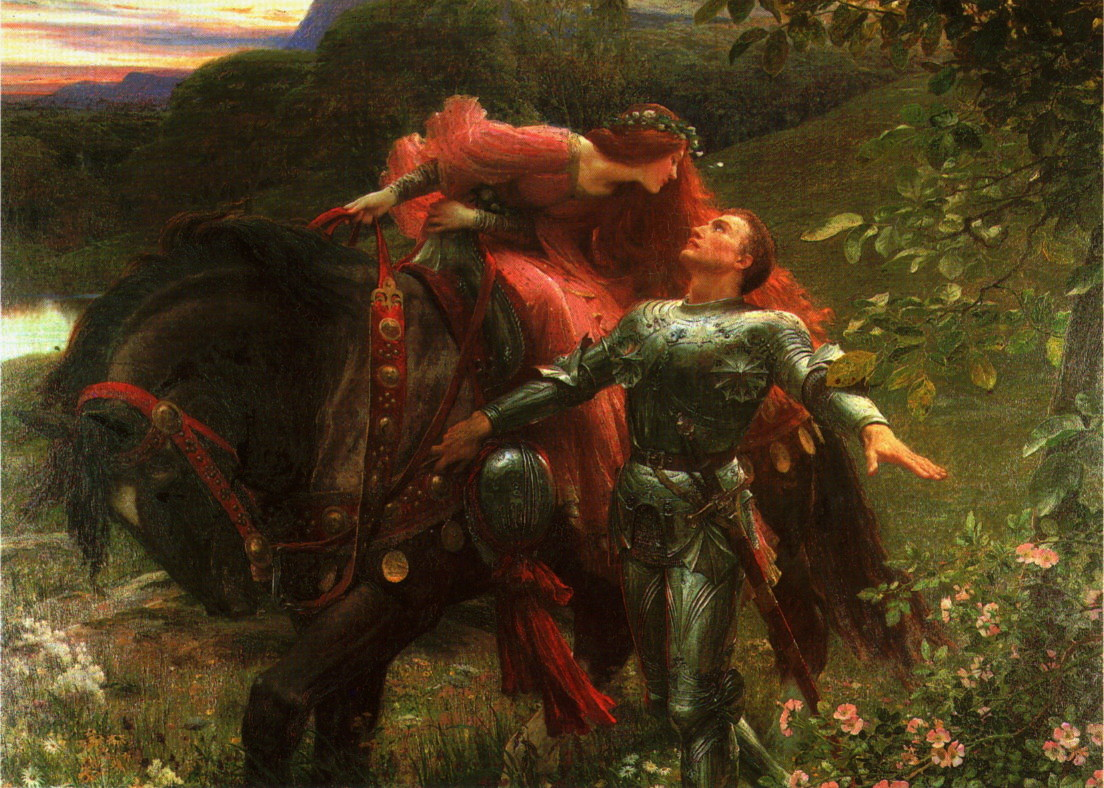
La Belle Dame sans Merci, 1902

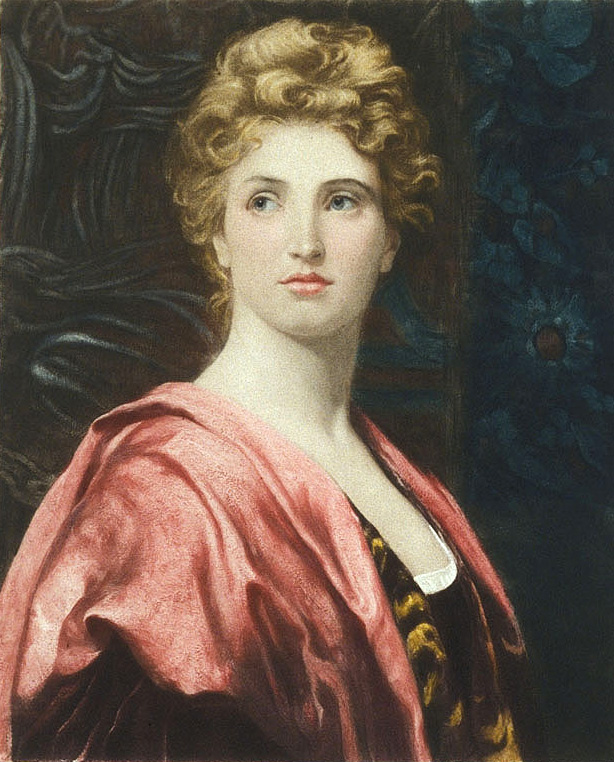
Beatrice, 1888

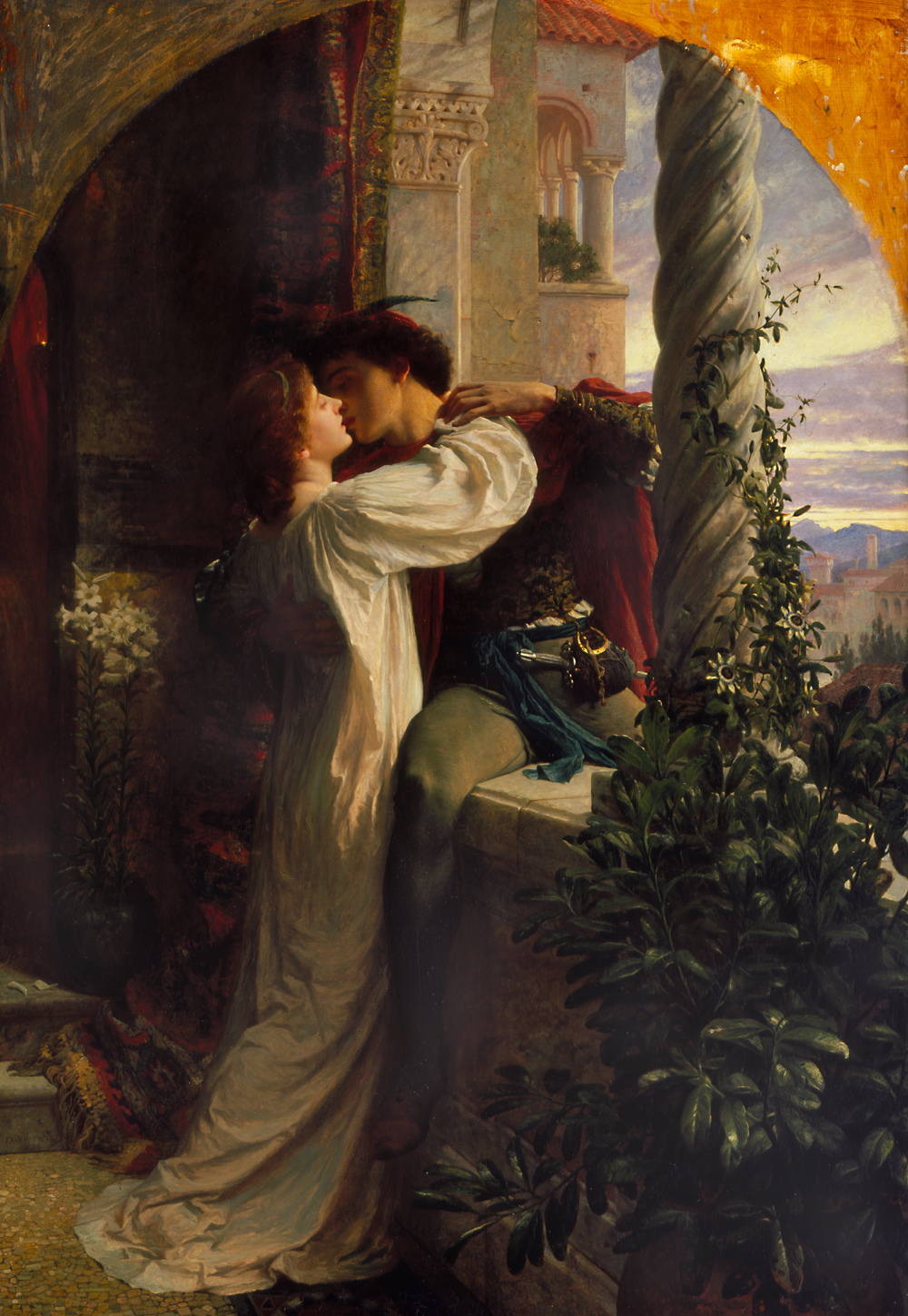
Romeo and Juliet, 1884

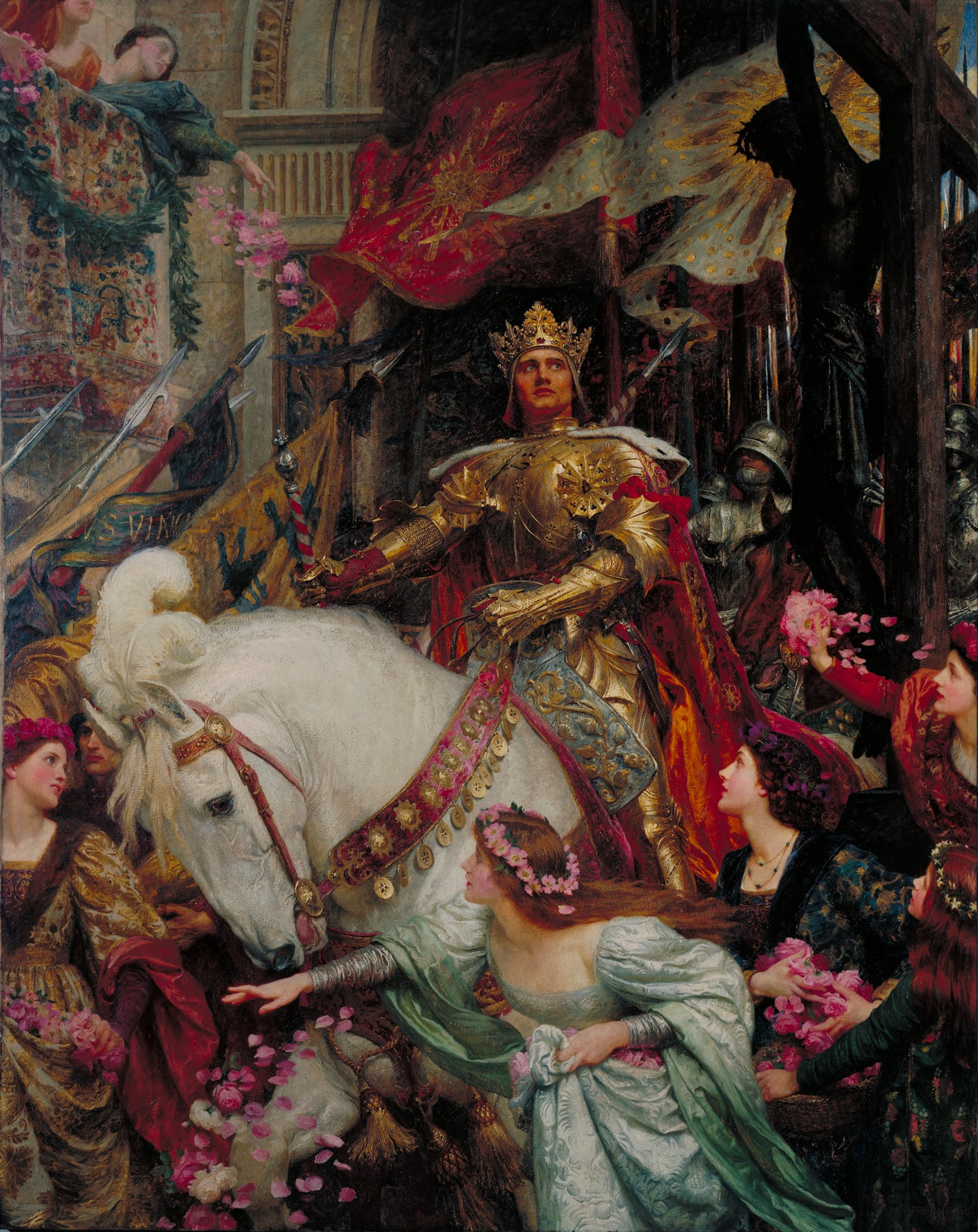
The Two Crowns, 1900

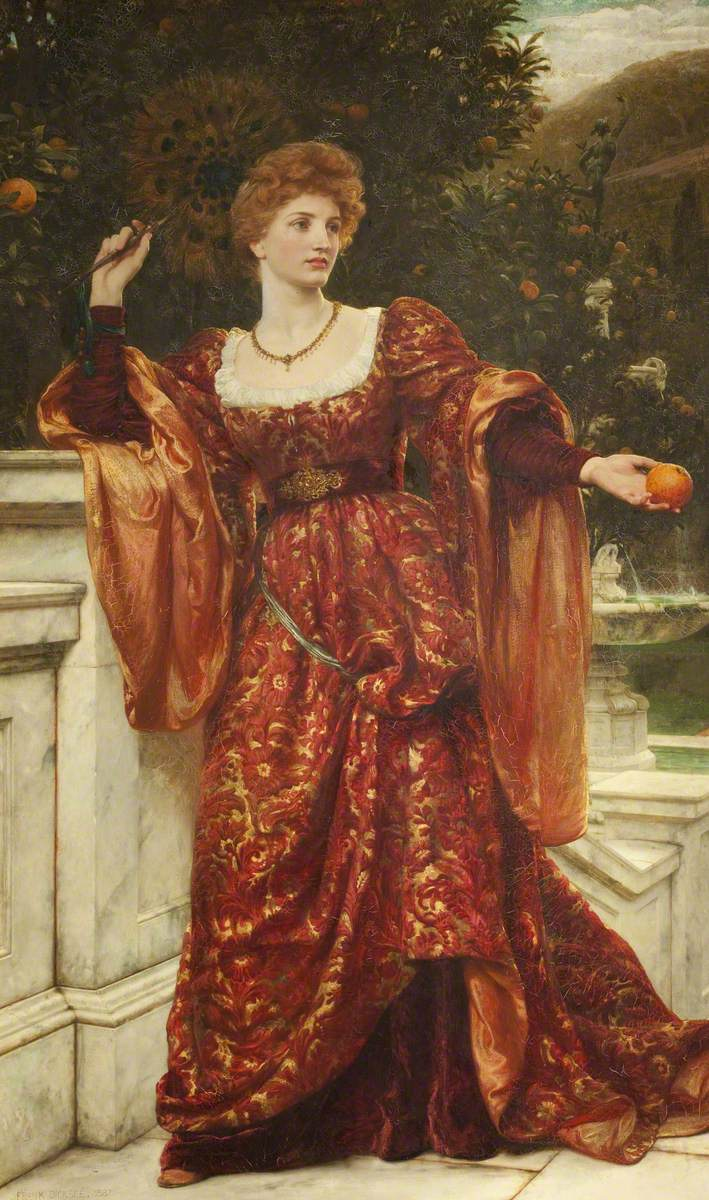
Hesperia, 1887

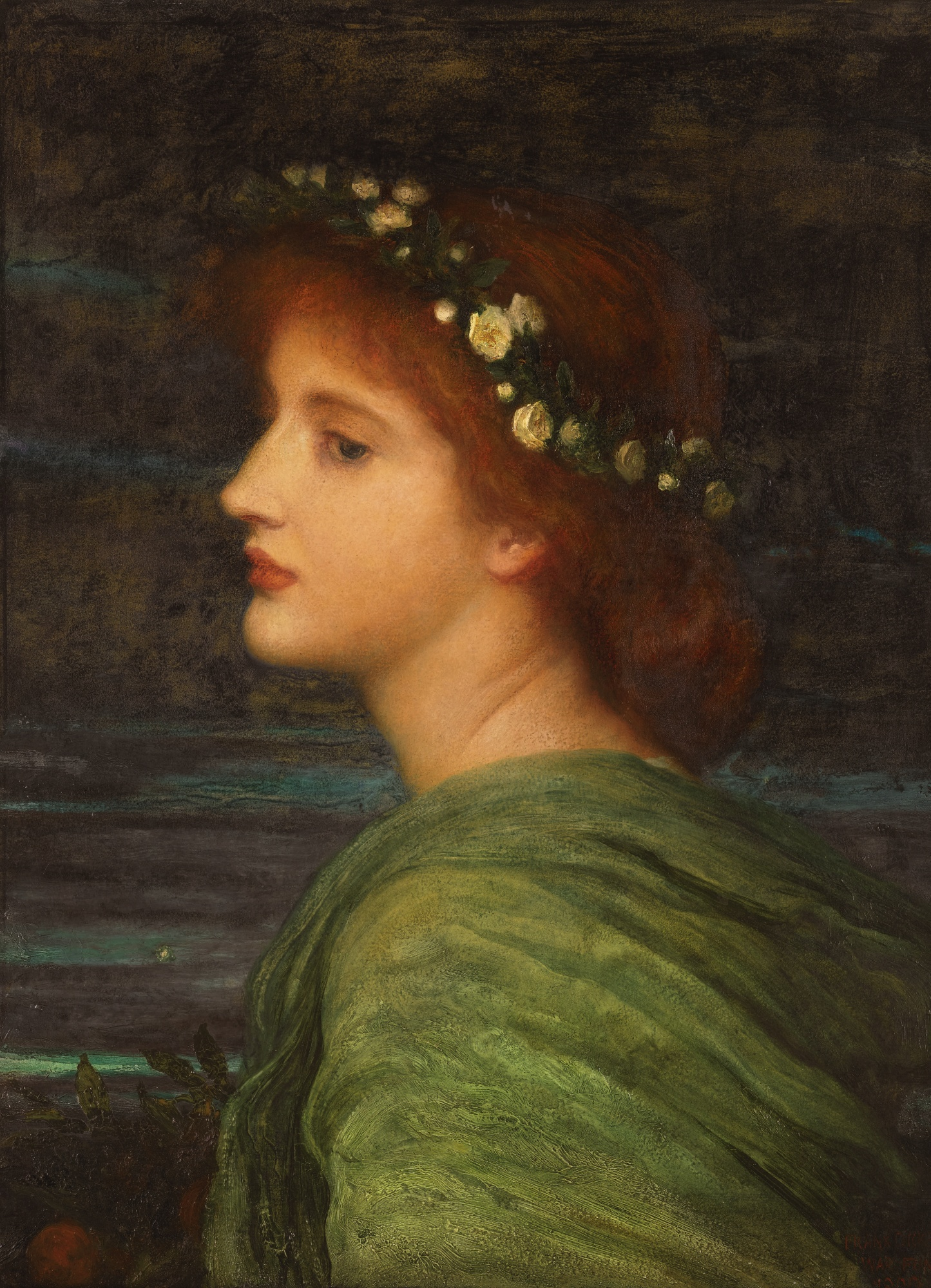
Stella, 1900

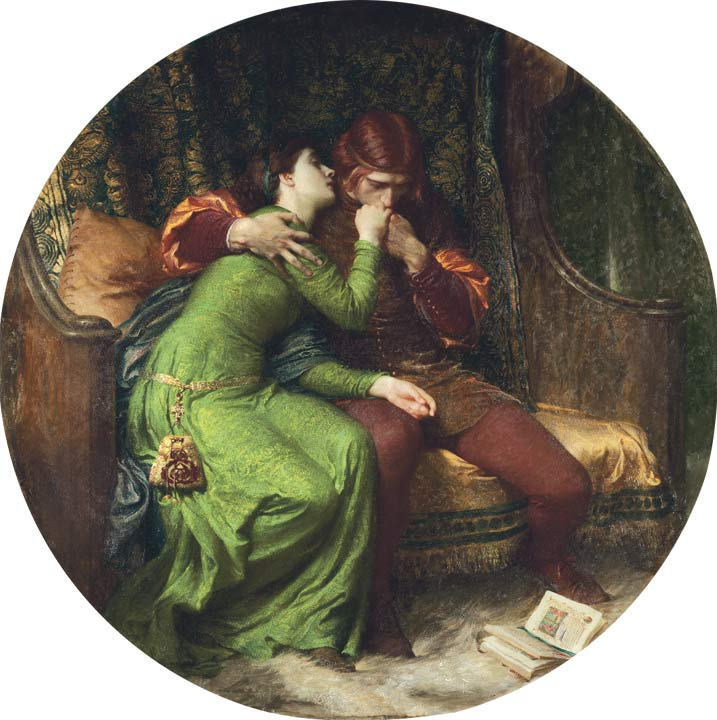
Paolo and Francesca, 1894

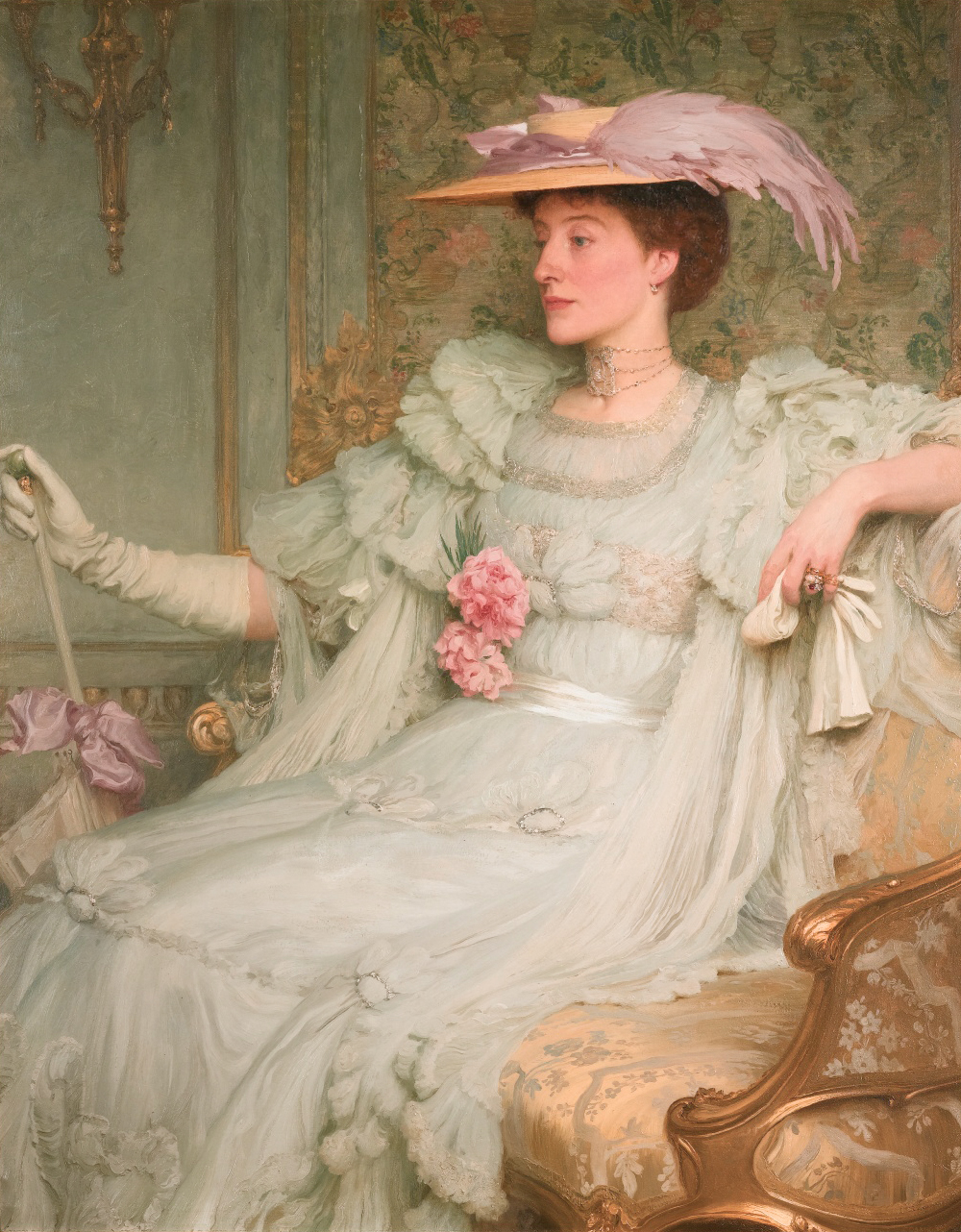
Lady Hillingdon, 1905

Portrait of Marie Clothilde Guinness, 1912

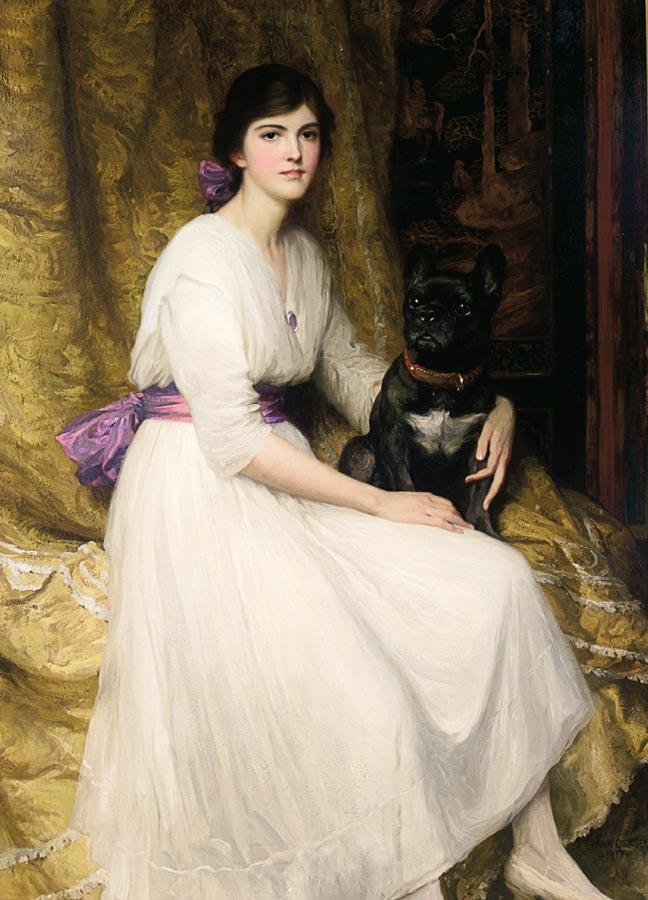
Portrait of the Artist's Niece, Dorothy, 1917

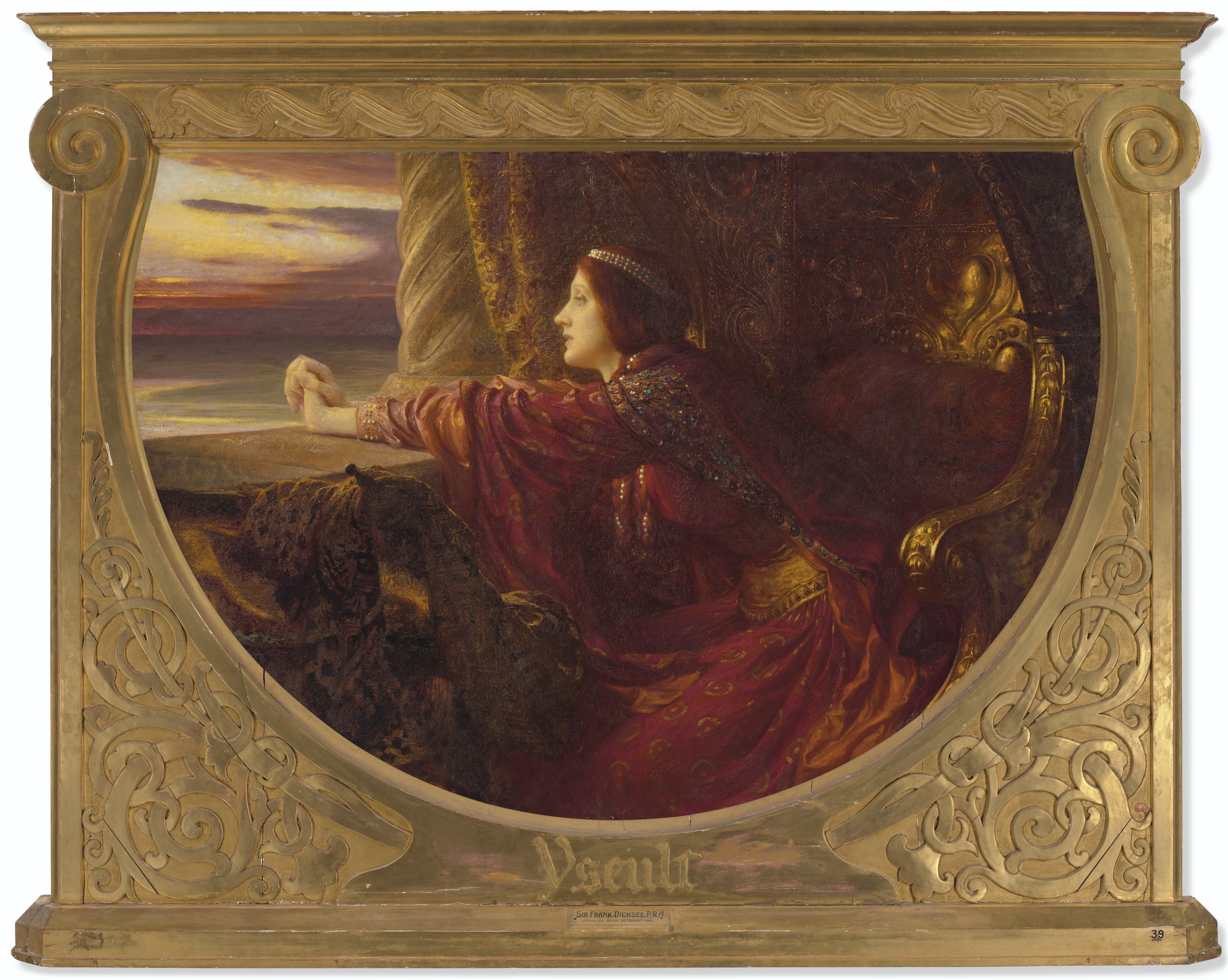
Yseult, 1901

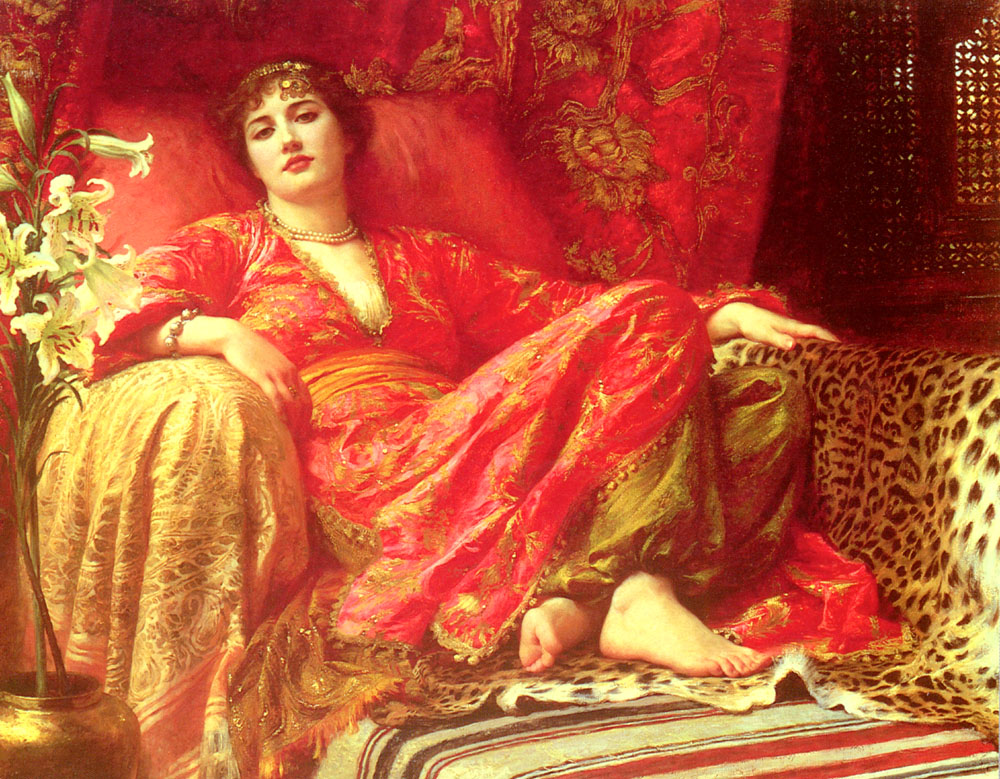
Passion, 1892

== See also ==
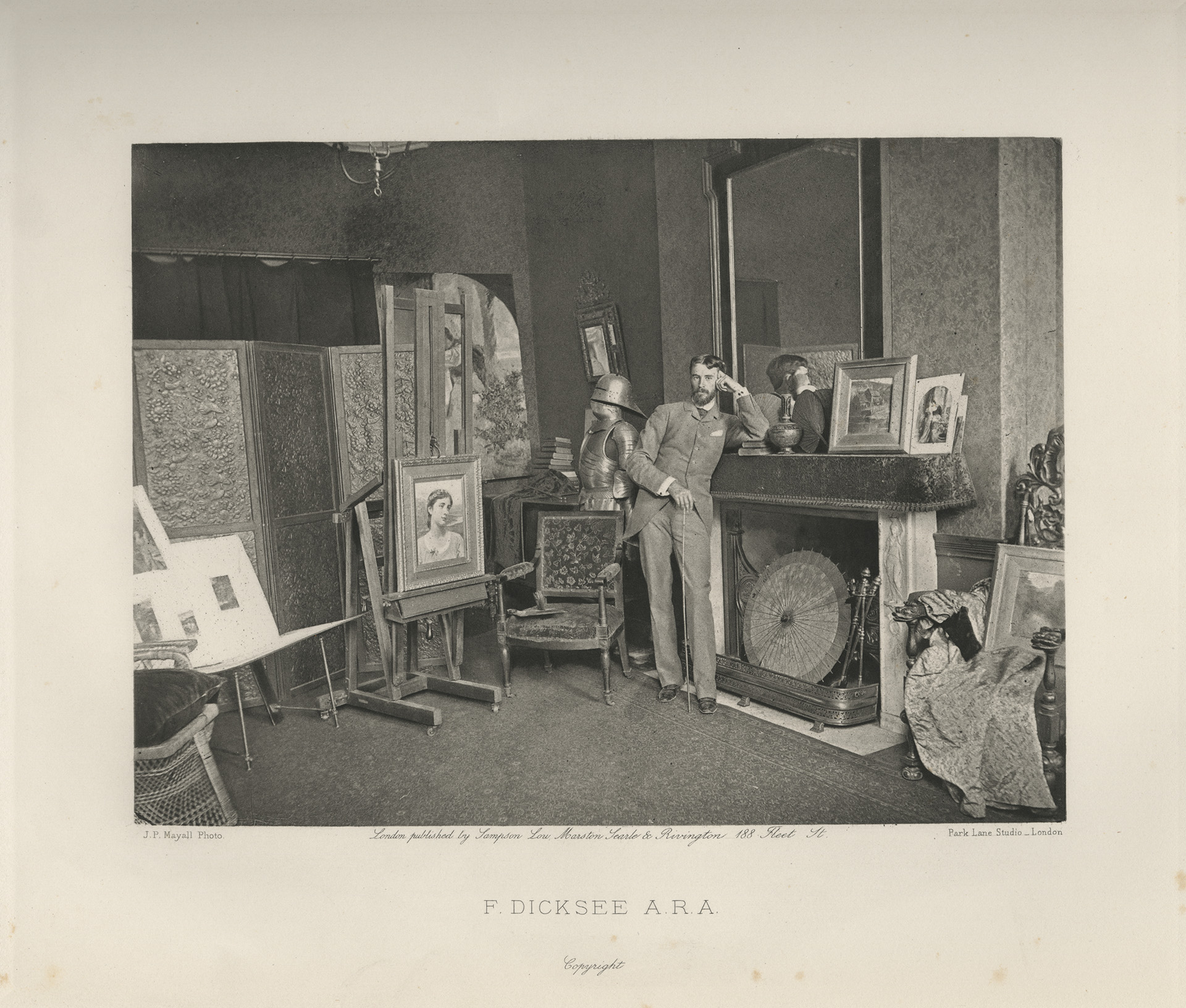
Dicksee by J. P. Mayall

- "La Belle Dame sans Merci"

Cultural offices
Preceded by Sir Aston Webb	President of the Royal Academy; 1924–1928	Succeeded by Sir William Llewellyn
