= 1923 in art =

Events from the year 1923 in art.

== Events ==
- March 20 – The Arts Club of Chicago hosts the opening of Pablo Picasso's first United States show, Original Drawings by Pablo Picasso.
- May 8 – Göteborgs Konsthall opens as the art gallery for the Gothenburg Exhibition.
- Publication of The Art Spirit by Robert Henri.
- English industrialist and collector Samuel Courtauld acquires the first painting by Paul Cézanne to be purchased for a British collection, Still life with Plaster Cupid (c.1894).
- Chaïm Soutine sells sixty of his paintings from a Paris showing to the American art collector Albert C. Barnes and begins his series of paintings of beef carcasses.
- A joint exhibition with his mother, Suzanne Valadon, at the Galerie Bernheim-Jeune in Paris brings the paintings of Maurice Utrillo to prominence.
- East London Group forms as an amateur art club in the East End of London.
- Freer Gallery of Art opens in Washington, D.C. as the first Smithsonian museum dedicated to the fine arts.
- Remington Art Memorial established in Ogdensburg, New York.
- Harwood Museum of Art established in Taos, New Mexico.
- Beaux Arts Gallery established in London by Frederick and Helen Lessore.

== Awards ==
- Archibald Prize: W B McInnes – Portrait of a Lady

== Works ==
- Max Beckmann – Dance in Baden-Baden
- George Bellows – Dempsey and Firpo
- Pierre Bonnard - La Cote D'azur
- Constantin Brâncuși – Bird in Space (sculpture; first version)
- Felice Casorati – Meriggio (Noon)
- Tamara de Lempicka – Les Deux amies
- Robert Delaunay – Portrait of Tristan Tzara
- Marcel Duchamp – The Bride Stripped Bare By Her Bachelors, Even (The Large Glass) (completed)
- Max Ernst – Pietà or Revolution by Night
- M. C. Escher – Dolphins (woodcut)
- George Grosz – Ecce Homo (portfolio of lithographs)
- Harold Harvey – My Kitchen
- Auguste Herbin – Bowls Players
- Marguerite Huré – Stained glass windows at Église Notre-Dame du Raincy
- Wassily Kandinsky – On White II
- Ernst Ludwig Kirchner – The Sleigh Ride
- John Lavery
  - The Jockeys' Dressing Room at Ascot
  - The Red Rose
- Sir Bertram Mackennal
  - Phoebus Driving the Horses of the Sun (Australia House, London)
  - Mother Courage (war memorial, Caledonian Club, London)
  - Here I Am, male nude for Eton College War Memorial (now National Gallery of Victoria, Australia)
- Henri Matisse – Odalisque with Raised Arms
- Mikhail Nesterov – Girl by the Pool
- William Orpen – To the Unknown British Soldier in France (first finished state)
- Pablo Picasso
  - The Pipes of Pan
  - Paulo on a Donkey
- Man Ray – Object to Be Destroyed (first version - destroyed 1957)
- Gerrit Rietveld – Red and Blue Chair (colours added in De Stijl style at about this date)
- Stanley Royle – Sheffield from Wincobank Wood
- John Singer Sargent – Sir Philip Sassoon
- Stanley Spencer – The Betrayal
- Lorado Taft – The Recording Angel (sculpture, Waupun, Wisconsin)
- Suzanne Valadon – Blue Room
- World War I Memorial (Berwick, Pennsylvania)
- Yokoyama Taikan – Metempsychosis (生々流転, Seisei ruten, "The Wheel of Life", Nihonga scroll painting)

== Births ==
- January 16 – Keith Shackleton, English painter and television host (d. 2015)
- February 10 – Shirley Jaffe, American-born abstract painter and sculptor (d. 2016)
- March 9 – André Courrèges, French fashion designer (d. 2016)
- April 8 – George Fisher, American political cartoonist (d. 2003)
- April 24 – Cordelia Oliver, Scottish journalist, painter and art critic (d. 2009)
- May 3 – Norman Thelwell, English cartoonist (d. 2004)
- May 15 – Richard Avedon, American photographer (d. 2004)
- May 22 – Max Velthuijs, Dutch painter, illustrator and author (d. 2005)
- May 27 – Inge Morath, Austrian photographer (d. 2002)
- May 31 – Ellsworth Kelly, American artist (d. 2015)
- June 3 – June Newton, Australian-born photographer (d. 2021)
- June 24 – Marc Riboud, French photographer (d. 2016)
- June 25 – Sam Francis, American painter and printmaker (d. 1994)
- July 12 – Paul Jenkins, American abstract expressionist painter (d. 2012)
- July 28 – Patrick George, English painter (d. 2016)
- September 13 – Edouard Boubat, French photographer (d. 1999)
- September 23 – Osuitok Ipeelee, Canadian Inuk sculptor (d. 2005)
- October 7 – Jean-Paul Riopelle, Canadian painter and sculptor (d. 2002)
- October 27 – Roy Lichtenstein, American pop artist (d. 1997)
- October 28 – David Aronson, Lithuanian-American painter (d. 2015)
- November 15 – Miriam Schapiro, Canadian-American feminist artist (d. 2015)
- December 1 – Morris (born Maurice De Bevere), Belgian cartoonist (d. 2001)
- December 13 – Antoni Tàpies, Spanish painter (d. 2012)
- date unknown – François Ozenda, French painter (d. 1976)

== Deaths ==
- January 12 – Marc Ferrez, Brazilian photographer (b. 1843)
- January 31 – Eligiusz Niewiadomski, Polish modernist painter, art critic and assassin (b. 1869)
- March 22 – Benjamin Williams Leader, English landscape painter (b. 1831)
- April 15 – Aleksander Sochaczewski, Polish painter (b. 1843)
- April 17 – Jan Kotěra, Czech artist, architect and designer (b. 1871)
- May 29 – Adolf Oberländer, German caricaturist (b. 1845)
- June 15 – Joseph B. Davol, American marine painter (b. 1864)
- June 21 – Edward Clark Potter, American sculptor (b. 1857)
- July 23 – Willy Gretor, Danish-born painter and art dealer (b. 1868)
- August 2/3 – Jacoba van Heemskerck, Dutch painter and graphic artist (b. 1876)
- August 5 – Candace Wheeler, American designer (b. 1827)
- October 2 – John Wilson Bengough, Canadian cartoonist (b. 1851)
- October 19 – Eleanor Norcross, American painter (b. 1854)
- November 2 – Stevan Aleksić, Serbian painter (b. 1876)
- November 27 – Penleigh Boyd, Australian landscape painter (b. 1890)
- December 13 – Théophile Steinlen, Swiss/French painter (b. 1859)
- date unknown – Edwin Romanzo Elmer, American painter (b. 1850)

== See also ==
- 1923 in fine arts of the Soviet Union
