= 1922 in art =

Events from the year 1922 in art.

== Events ==
- February 1 – Akron Art Institute opens in Ohio.
- February 10–17 – Modern Art Week (Semana de Arte Moderna) at the Theatro Municipal, São Paulo, marks the start of Modernism in Brazil.
- March 5 – Release of influential German silent vampire film Nosferatu with production design by Albin Grau.
- April 30 – The official Salon of 1922 held by the Société des Artistes Français at the Grand Palais in Paris opens
- May 1 – The Royal Academy Exhibition of 1922 opens at Burlington House in London
- November 1 – The Salon d'Automne of 1922 takes place at the Grand Palais in Paris
- December 16
  - Gabriel Narutowicz, sworn on December 11 as first president of the Second Polish Republic, is assassinated by right-wing modernist painter and art critic Eligiusz Niewiadomski at the Zachęta art gallery in Warsaw.
  - Lady Lever Art Gallery opens in Port Sunlight, England.
- December 20 – Antigone by Jean Cocteau appears on the stage of the Théâtre de l'Atelier in the Montmartre district of Paris, with settings by Pablo Picasso, music by Arthur Honegger and costumes by Gabrielle Chanel. There are some protests by Dadaists.
- Perm State Art Gallery in the Soviet Union established in a former Orthodox cathedral.
- Max Beerbohm's collection of caricatures, Rossetti and His Circle, is published in London.
- Fernando Álvarez de Sotomayor y Zaragoza, court painter to Alfonso XIII of Spain, is appointed director of the Museo del Prado in Madrid.
- Painter Annie Swynnerton becomes the first woman elected as an Associate of the Royal Academy of Arts in London.
- German psychiatrist Hans Prinzhorn publishes Bildnerei der Geisteskranken (Artistry of the Mentally Ill).

== Awards ==
- Archibald Prize: W B McInnes – Professor Harrison Moore
- Newbery Medal – Rene Paul Chambellan

== Works ==
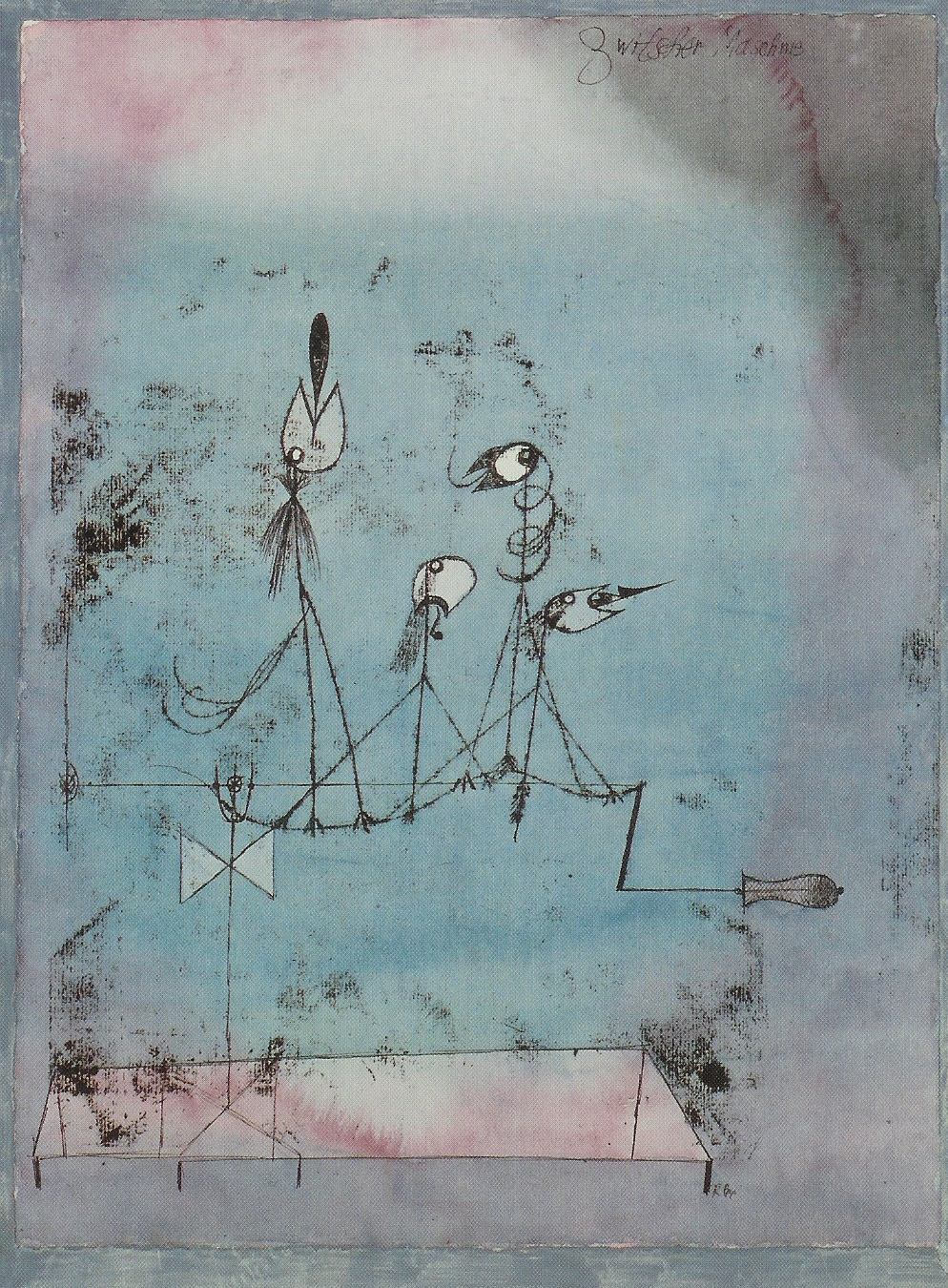
Paul Klee – Twittering Machine (MOMA)

- Max Beckmann – The Iron Footbridge
- Alvar Cawén – Sokea soittoniekka (Blind Musician)
- Jean Charlot – The Massacre of the Templo Mayor (mural, Antiguo Colegio de San Ildefonso, Mexico City)
- Salvador Dalí – Cabaret Scene
- Giorgio de Chirico – The Prodigal Son (Il figliol prodigo)
- Otto Dix – Lustmord ("Lust Murder", watercolor)
- Lydia Field Emmet – Harriet Lancashire White and Her Children
- Mark Gertler – Queen of Sheba
- J. W. Godward
  - Contemplation
  - Nu Sur la Plage
- Basil Gotto – The Fighting Newfoundlander
- Juan Gris – Le Pierrot
- Charles Keck – Lifting the Veil of Ignorance
- Paul Klee – Twittering Machine
- George Washington Lambert – Anzac, the landing, 1915
- John Lavery – Michael Collins (Love of Ireland)
- Max Liebermann – Albert Einstein
- L. S. Lowry – A Manufacturing Town
- Edward McCartan – Dream Lady (Eugene Field Memorial, Chicago)
- Dugald Sutherland MacColl – On the Terrace
- Sydney March
  - Bromley War Memorial (London)
  - Lancaster Monument (The Angel of Death, East Sheen Cemetery, London)
- André Masson – Pedestal Table in the Studio
- Joan Miró – The Farm
- Alfred Munnings – Kilkenny Horse Fair
- Charles Henry Niehaus – Orpheus with the Awkward Foot
- William Orpen
  - Portrait of Roland Knoedler
  - To the Unknown British Soldier in France
- Maxfield Parrish – Daybreak
- Pablo Picasso – Two Women Running on the Beach (The Race)
- Charles Sheeler – Pertaining to Yachts and Yachting
- John Singer Sargent - General Officers of World War I
- Sophie Taeuber-Arp – Oval Composition with Abstract Motifs

== Births ==
=== January to June ===
- January 1 – Jerry Robinson, American illustrator (d. 2011)
- January 8 – Jan Nieuwenhuys, Dutch painter (d. 1986)
- January 11 – William Turnbull, Scottish-born sculptor (d. 2012)
- January 17 – Robert De Niro, Sr., American abstract expressionist painter (d. 1993)
- January 23 – Leon Golub, American painter (d. 2004)
- March 10 – Kiyoshi Yamashita, Japanese outsider artist (d. 1971)
- March 27 – Jules Olitski, American abstract painter, printmaker, and sculptor (d. 2007)
- March 28 – Grace Hartigan, American Abstract Expressionist painter (d. 2008)
- April 22 – Richard Diebenkorn, American painter (d. 1993)
- April 24 – Richard Hamilton, English painter and collage artist (d. 2011)
- May 7 – Joe O'Donnell, American photographer (d. 2007)
- May 15 – Hedi Turki, Tunisian abstract painter (d. 2019)
- June 22 – Bill Blass, American fashion designer (d. 2002)

=== July to December ===
- July 3 – Corneille Guillaume Beverloo, "Corneille", Dutch painter (d. 2010)
- July 25 – Fred Yates, English artist (d. 2008)
- August 1 – Paul Fitzgerald, Australian painter (d. 2017)
- August 8 – Rudi Gernreich, Austrian American fashion designer (d. 1985)
- September 3 – Steffan Danielsen, Faroese painter (d. 1976)
- September 9 – Pauline Baynes, English book illustrator (d. 2008)
- October 3 – John Craxton, English painter (d. 2009)
- October 6 – Ljubinka Jovanović, Serbian painter living and working in Paris and Belgrade (d. 2015)
- November 26 – Charles M. Schulz, American cartoonist and comics artist (Peanuts) (d. 2000)
- December 8 – Lucian Freud, German-born British painter and printmaker (d. 2011)
- December 17 – Aart van den IJssel, Dutch sculptor (d. 1983)
- December 31 – Theodoros Stamos, Greek American abstract expressionist painter (d.1997)

== Deaths ==
- January 23 – René Beeh, German painter and draughtsman from Alsace (b. 1886)
- February – Algernon Graves, English art historian (b. 1845)
- February 3 – John Butler Yeats, Irish painter (b. 1839)
- February 5 – Paul Durand-Ruel, French art dealer, patron of the Impressionists (b. 1831)
- February 19 – Karl Isakson, Swedish artist (b. 1878)
- March 16 – Reinhold Lepsius, German painter (b. 1857)
- May 15 – Leslie Ward ("Spy"), English cartoonist (b. 1851)
- June 22 – Étienne Terrus, French painter (b. 1857)
- August 22 - Thomas Brock, English sculptor and medalist (b. 1847)
- August – Robert Bateman, English painter, illustrator, sculptor and architect (b. 1842)
- September 1 – Edmund Leighton, English historical genre painter (b. 1852)
- September 5 – Georgette Agutte, French painter (b. 1867)
- September 8 – Léon Bonnat, French painter (b. 1833)
- October 18 – August Gaul, German sculptor (b. 1869)
- December 13 – John William Godward, English neo-Classicist painter (b. 1861) (suicide)
- December 15 – Sir Sydney Prior Hall, English portraitist and illustrator (b. 1842)
- date unknown
  - Milly Childers, English painter (b. 1866)
  - Marie-Hortense Fiquet, French model and wife of Paul Cézanne (b. 1850)
  - Jean Baptiste Guth, French watercolor portraitist (b. 1855)

== See also ==
- 1922 in fine arts of the Soviet Union
