= World War I Memorial =

World War I Memorial may refer to:

== United States ==
- District of Columbia War Memorial, on the National Mall
- National World War I Memorial (Washington, D.C.), in Pershing Park
- World War I Memorial (Norfolk, Connecticut)
- World War I Memorial (Boston), Massachusetts
- National World War I Museum and Memorial, Kansas City, Missouri
- World War I Memorial (Atlantic City, New Jersey)
- World War I Memorial (Salem, Oregon)
- World War I Memorial (Berwick, Pennsylvania)
- World War I Memorial (East Providence, Rhode Island)
- World War I Memorial (Salt Lake City) or The Pagoda, Utah

== Other countries ==
- World War I Memorial (Tiruchirappalli), Tamil Nadu, India

== See also ==
- World War I memorials
