= 1997 in art =

Events from the year 1997 in art.

== Events ==
- January 27 – It is revealed that French museums have nearly 2,000 pieces of art that had been stolen by Nazis.
- February 22 – Gustav Klimt's Portrait of a Lady (overpainted 1917 on Portrait of a Young Lady) is stolen from the Galleria d'arte moderna Ricci Oddi in Piacenza, Italy. It is recovered from a hiding place in the exterior of the building in December 2019.
- March 6 – Pablo Picasso's Tête de Femme is stolen from the Lefevre Gallery in London's Mayfair by an armed robber. It is recovered a week later.
- April 27 – Andrew Cunanan murders Jeffrey Trail, beginning a murder spree that will last until July and end with the murder of fashion designer Gianni Versace.
- September 8 – Marcus Harvey's controversial painting of Myra Hindley goes on display at the Royal Academy of Art in London and is vandalised twice, by two different artists, on the opening day.
- October 18 – Guggenheim Museum Bilbao, designed by Frank Gehry, is opened.
- December 2 – Is Painting Dead?, a discussion on ITV in the UK following this year's Turner Prize award, becomes notorious for artist Tracey Emin appearing drunk and storming off.

=== Full date unknown ===
- Puppy by Jeff Koons is moved from Sydney Harbour to the Guggenheim Museum Bilbao.
- Robert Colescott becomes the first African-American to represent the United States in a solo exhibition at the Venice Biennial.
- Istanbul Contemporary Art Museum is established by conceptual artist Genco Gulan in Turkey as an art project.
- Patricia Martín conceives La Colección Jumex in Mexico City.

== Exhibitions ==
- Sensation opens at the Royal Academy of Art in London.
- Kate and Helen Storey's Primitive Streak opens at the Institute of Contemporary Arts in London.
- Documenta X opens in Kassel.
- October 29 until February 28, 1998 - Jackie Winsor: Sculpture at MoMA PS1 in Long Island City, Queens, New York City, New York.

== Awards ==
- Archibald Prize – Nigel Thomson, Barbara Blackman
- John Moores Painting Prize - Dan Hays for "Harmony in Green"
- Schock Prize in Visual Arts – Torsten Andersson
- Turner Prize – Gillian Wearing

-The Venice Biennial-

- The Lion d'or (Golden Lion) for Lifetime Achievement: Emilio Vedova (Italy), Agnes Martin (USA)
- The Lion d'or for Best Pavilion: France exhibiting the work of Fabrice Hyber

== Artworks ==
- Matthew Barney - The Erich Weiss Suite
- Norman Bluhm - Ode to Apollo
- Louise Bourgeois – Eye Benches I, II and III (Seattle)
- Maurizio Cattelan – Turisti (installation, first version)
- Thornton Dial - The Bridge dedicated to Congressman John Lewis at John Lewis Plaza in Freedom Park in Atlanta, Georgia
- Lucian Freud – Eight Months Gone
- Zenos Frudakis – Statue of Ellis Arnall (Atlanta)
- Antony Gormley – Another Place (sculpture)
- Rodney Graham – Vexation Island (film loop)
- Roni Horn - Untitled (Flannery)
- Philip Jackson
  - Gurkha Memorial, London
  - Raoul Wallenberg Monument, London
- Larry Kirkland – Garden Wreath (installation, Portland, Oregon)
- Gabriel Koren - El-Hajj Malik Shabazz, Malcolm X placed at the Audubon Ballroom in Manhattan, New York City
- Sarah Lucas – Bunny Gets Snookered (installation, including Pauline Bunny)
- Ron Mueck – Dead Dad, Angel, Big Baby II and III, Man in a Sheet and Mask (Self Portrait) (sculptures)
- Odd Nerdrum
  - The Savior of Painting
  - Self-Portrait in Golden Cape
- Cornelia Parker
  - Mass (Colder Darker Matter) (installation)
  - The Negative of Whispers (sculpture of found material)
  - Pornographic Drawings
- Martin Puryear – Bearing Witness (sculpture, Washington, D.C.)
- Richard Serra - Snake (completed)
- Gillian Wearing – 10–16 (video)

== Films ==
- The Dog of Flanders: The Movie

== Deaths ==
=== January to June ===
- January 23 – Jeremy Maas, English art dealer and historian of Victorian painting (b. 1928).
- January 25 – Dan Barry, American cartoonist (b. 1923)
- February 2 – Theodoros Stamos, Greek American abstract expressionist painter (b.1922).
- March 7 – Martin Kippenberger, German artist (b.1953).
- March 11 – Sam Golden, paint maker (b.1915).
- March 15 – Victor Vasarely, Hungarian-French artist (b.1906).
- March 19 – Willem de Kooning, Dutch born American abstract expressionist painter (b.1904).
- March 31 – Nandor Glid, Yugoslav and Serbian sculptor (b.1924).
- April 16 – Roland Topor, French illustrator, painter, writer and filmmaker (b.1938).
- April 20 – Jean Louis, French costume designer (b.1907).
- April 22 – Reg Gammon, English painter and illustrator (b.1894)
- May 23 – James Lee Byars, American artist (b.1932).

=== July to December ===
- July 15 – Gianni Versace, Italian fashion designer, murdered (b. 1946; murdered)
- July 16 – Dora Maar, French photographer, poet and painter, lover of Pablo Picasso (b. 1907)
- August 4 – Tom Eckersley, English poster artist (b. 1914)
- September 6 – Jean-Pierre Sudre, French photographer (b. 1921)
- September 29 – Roy Lichtenstein, American pop artist (b. 1923)
- October 22 – Leonid Amalrik, Russian animator and animation director (b. 1905)
- October 23 – Claire Falkenstein, American sculptor and painter (b. 1908)
- November 26 - Philip Berman, art collector, philanthropist, and co-founder of the Philip and Muriel Berman Museum at Ursinus College in Collegeville, Pennsylvania (b. 1915
- December 16 – Lillian Disney, American artist and wife of Walt Disney (b. 1899)

=== Full date unknown ===
- Jean Pierre Capron, French painter (b.1921).
