= Royal Academy Exhibition of 1923 =

1923 art exhibition in London

My Kitchen by Harold Harvey

The Royal Academy Exhibition of 1923 was the hundred and fifty fifth annual Summer Exhibition of the British Royal Academy of Arts which was held at Burlington House in London's Piccadilly from 7 May to 11 August 1923. It attracted 164,000 visitors.

One of the most talked about works on display was William Orpen's To the Unknown British Soldier in France which commemorated the The Unknown Warrior, buried in Westminster Abbey to honour all those killed in the First World War who had never been identified. However concerns were raised about the composition and the two figures on either side. Orpen made alterations before it was finally accepted by the Imperial War Museum. Orpen had been a notable war artist on the Western Front. Orpen also exhibited portrait paintings of a number of figures including Lord Glenavy.

His fellow Irish artist John Lavery displayed several portraits including one of W. T. Cosgrave the leader of the Irish Free State and one of James Craig, the first Prime Minister of Northern Ireland while The Red Rose featured his wife Hazel Lavery. The Anglo-American artist James Jebusa Shannon posthumously exhibited a joint portrait of the Japanese naval attaché Shimazu Tadashige and his wife.

Alfred Munnings showed his Impressionististic Kilkenny Horse Fair which he later presented to Royal Academy as his diploma work. Munnings also displayed My Horse is My Friend. Maurice Greiffenhagen also submitted his diploma work The Message, a scene of the biblical Annunciation. Algernon Talmage's Midsummer Day, Dedham is a landscape painting depicting Dedham in Constable Country. Philip Connard displayed Kensington Gardens. Bernard Gribble exhibited Nelson's First Prize, a scene from the life of Horatio Nelson, which was acquired by The Admiralty for Dartmouth Naval College.

== Gallery ==
A Provençal Fountain by Henry Herbert La Thangue

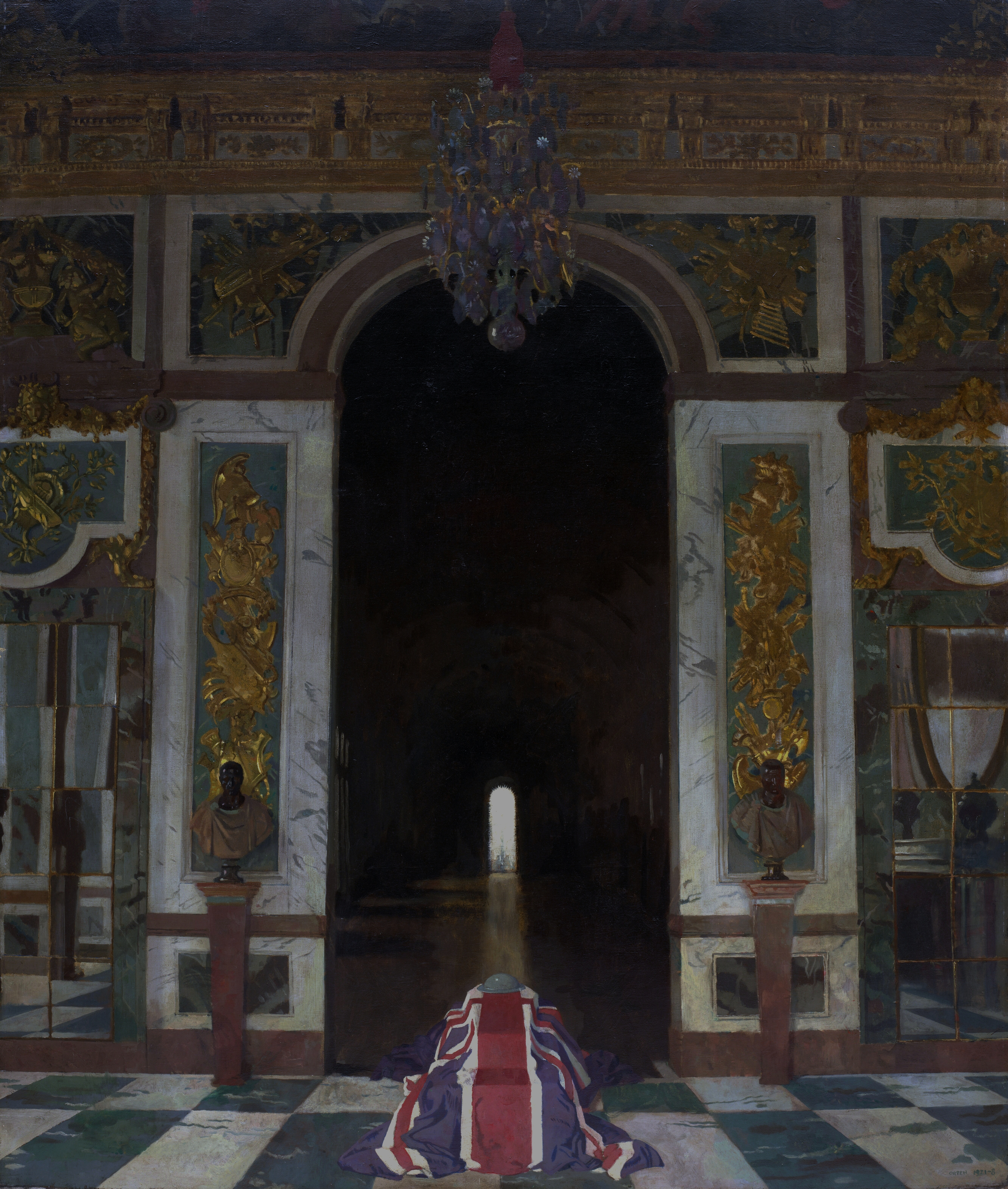
To the Unknown British Soldier in France by William Orpen

The Little Dancer by Glyn Philpot

On Paul Hill by Stanhope Forbes

Florist and Fruiterer by Stanhope Forbes

Market Jew, Thursday by Stanhope Forbes

The White House by Stanhope Forbes

The Road, Winter Morning by George Clausen

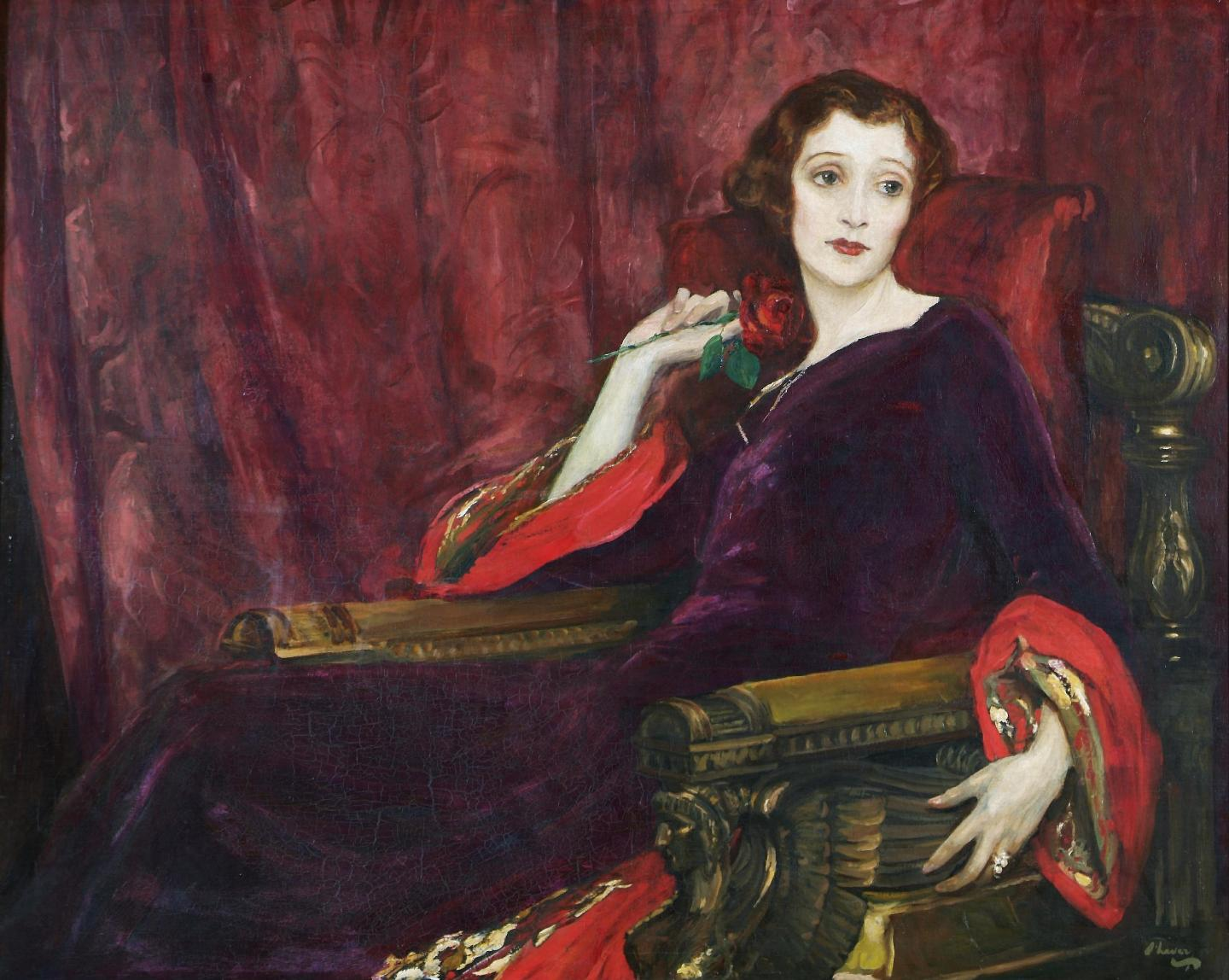
The Red Rose by John Lavery

Sisters by Wilfrid de Glehn

Chimeras by Charles Ricketts

The Trojan Women by Charles Ricketts

Orpheus and Euridice by Charles Ricketts

Pillar Roses by Joseph Farquharson

The Ivy, The Oak and The Bonnie Birken Tree by David Murray

The Women Going into the Sepulchre by Robert Anning Bell

The Moon Maiden by Frank Dicksee

King Charles Castle, Salcombe by Lamorna Birch

The Little Maid by Frank Gascoigne Heath

The Watch Tower by John Arnesby Brown

Montagna Mia by Annie Swynnerton

Mount Canaille, Cassis by Mark Fisher

The Willow Pond by Charles Haslewood Shannon

Penelope by Glyn Philpot

The Message by Maurice Greiffenhagen

The Lesson by Marianne Stokes

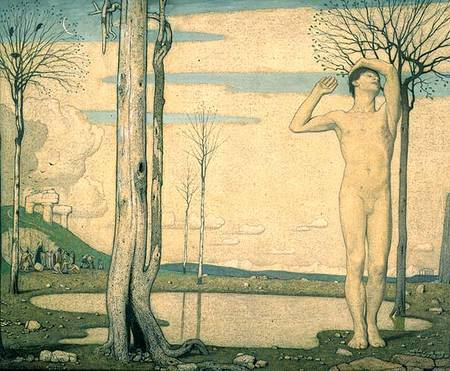
The Youth by Frederick Cayley Robinson

The Porch of the Old Ashmolean, Oxford by William Logsdail

The Terrier Man of the South Oxfordshire Hunt by William Logsdail

Miss Pearl Hood by Maurice Greiffenhagen

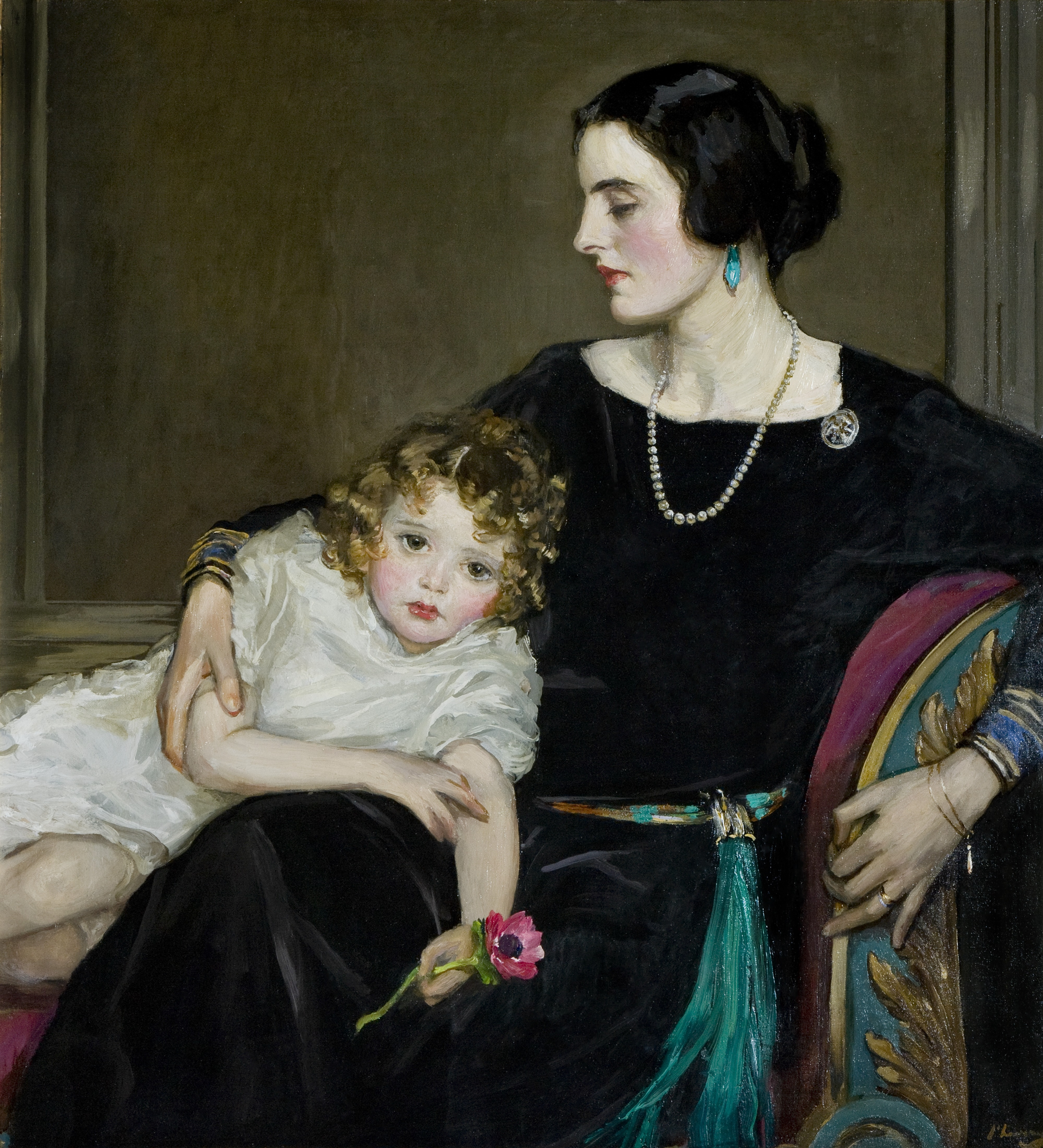
Portrait of Mrs Forbes-Sempill and Anne Moira by John Lavery

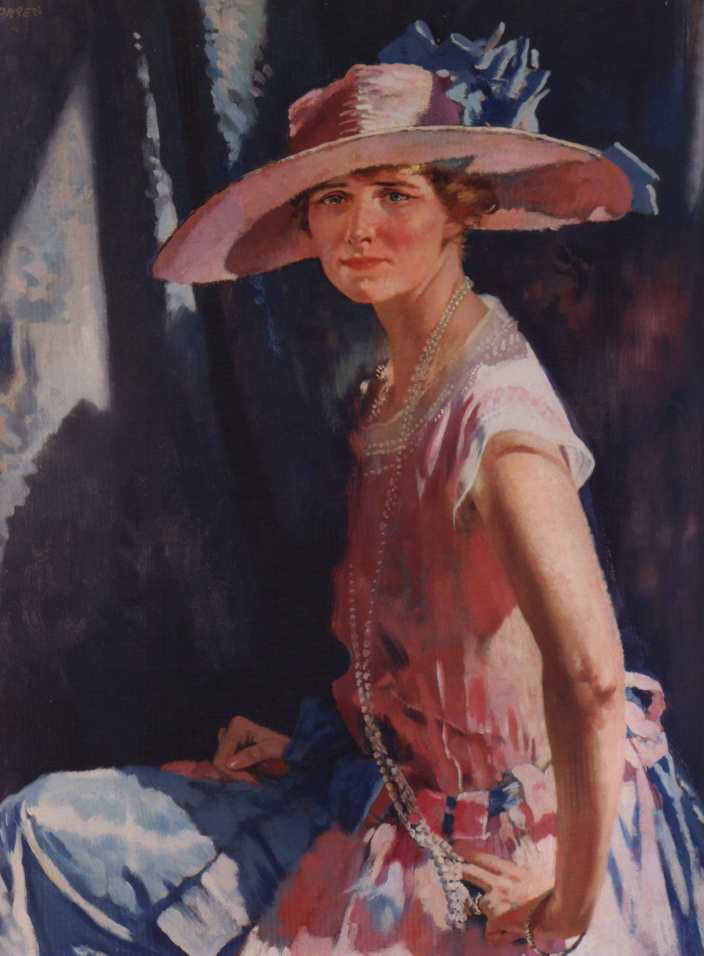
Portrait of Susan Vanderpoel Clark by William Orpen

Portrait of James Craig by John Lavery

Portrait of W. T. Cosgrave by John Lavery

Portrait of Sir Frederick Banbury by John Collier

Portrait of John William Simpson by Arthur Stockdale Cope

Portrait of the Duke of Rutland by Richard Jack

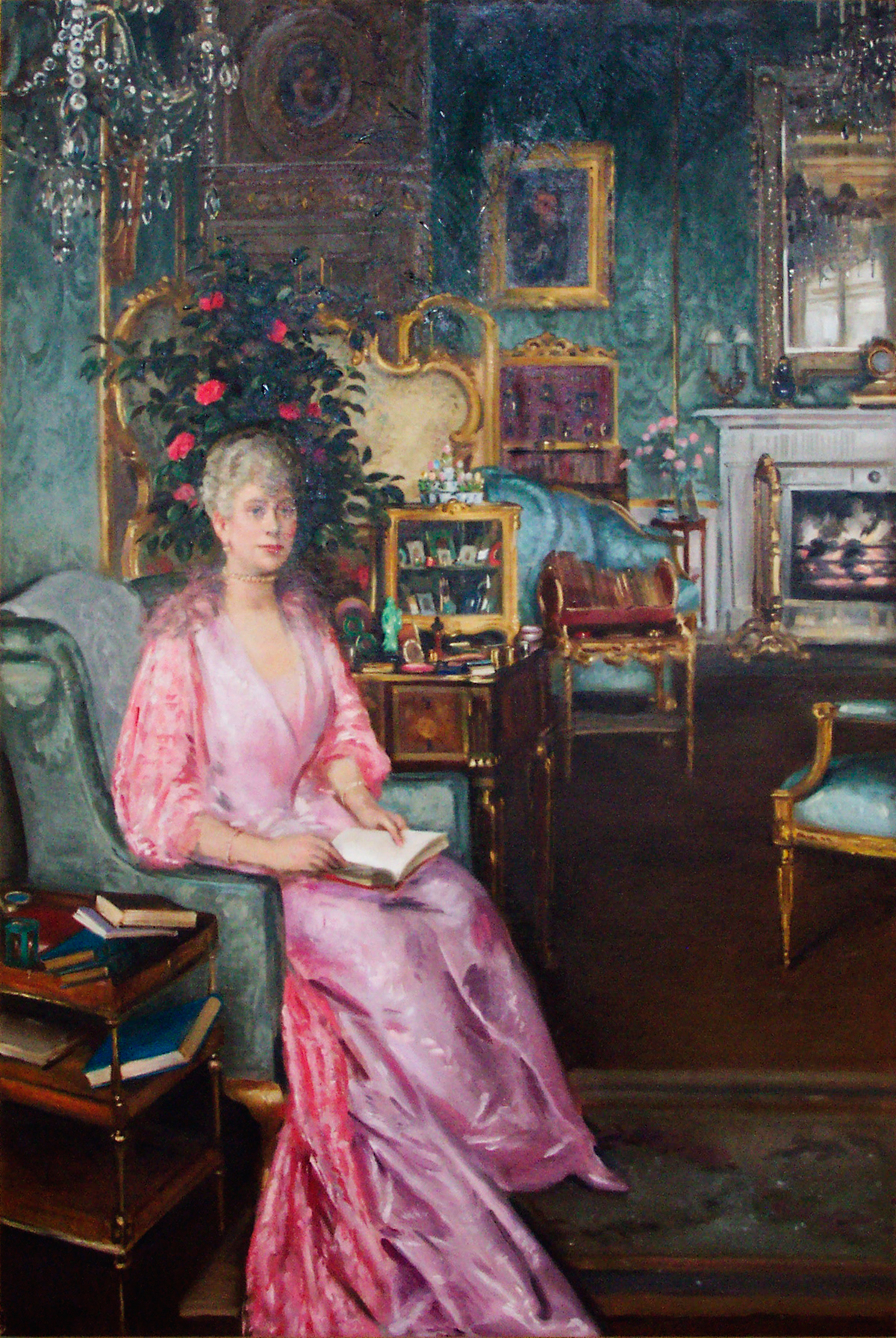
Portrait of Mary of Teck by William Bruce Ellis Ranken

Portrait of the Duke of Northumberland by Hugh De Twenebrokes Glazebrook

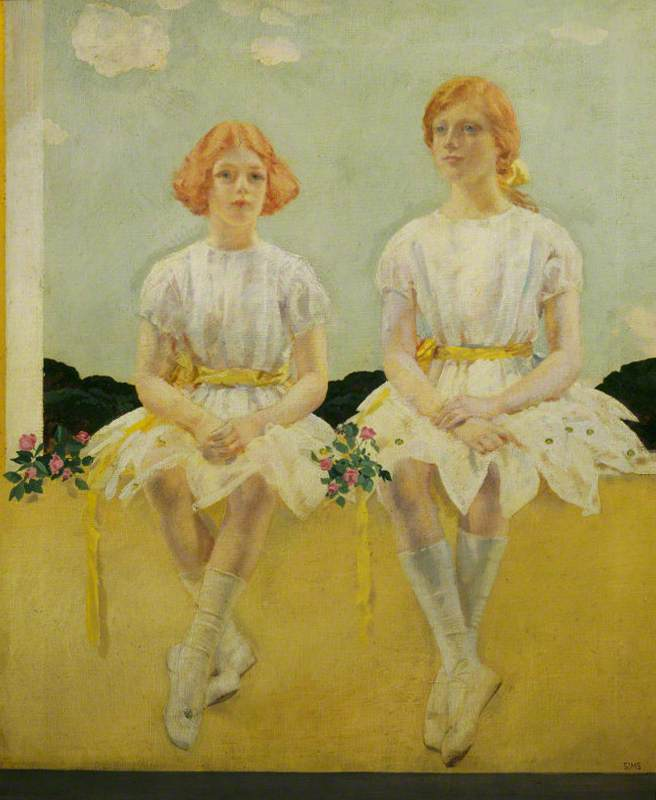
The Daughters of Winston Churchill by Charles Sims

Portrait of Edward Henry Busk by John Singer Sargent

Portrait of John Struthers by Maurice Greiffenhagen

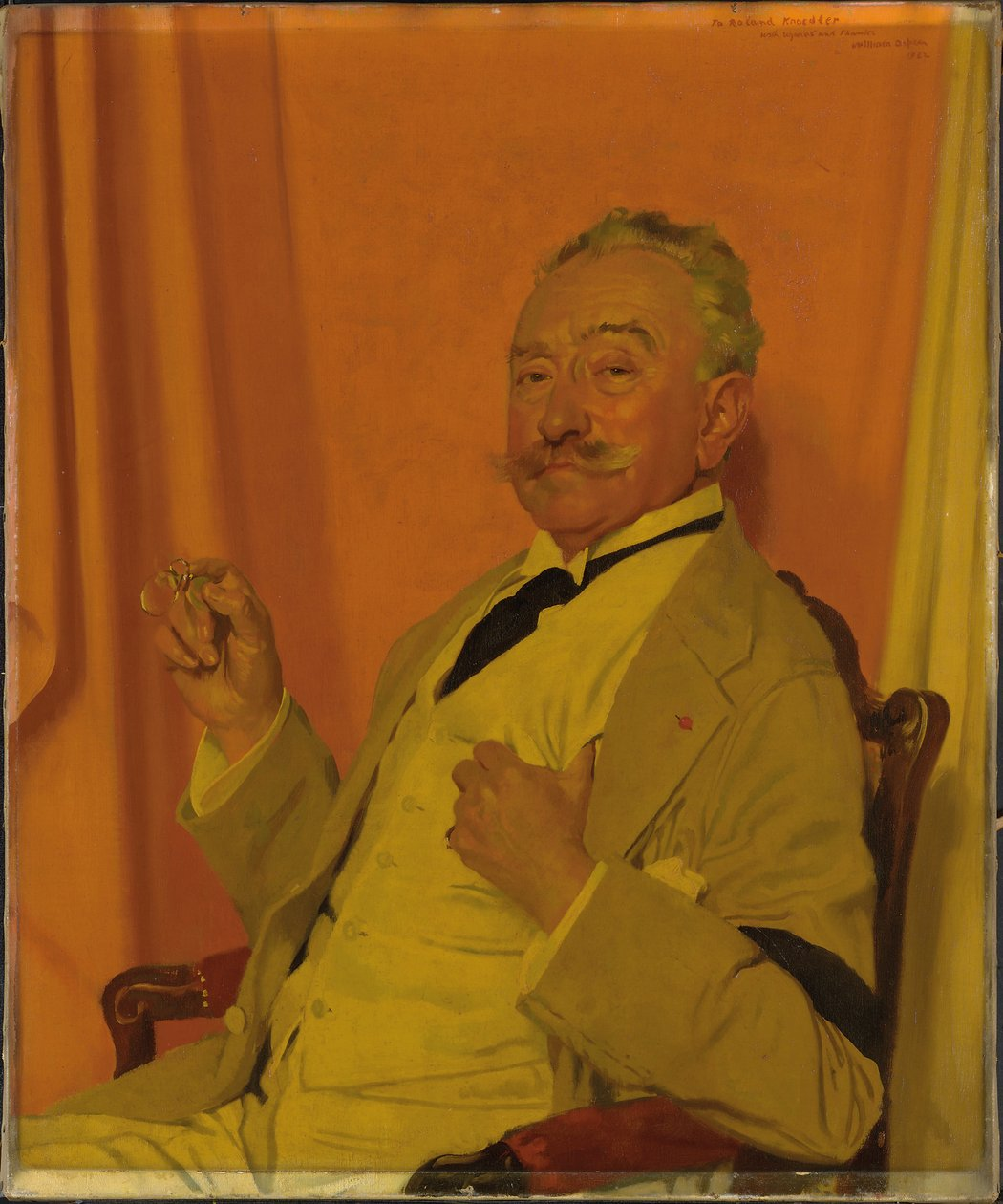
Portrait of Roland Knoedler by William Orpen

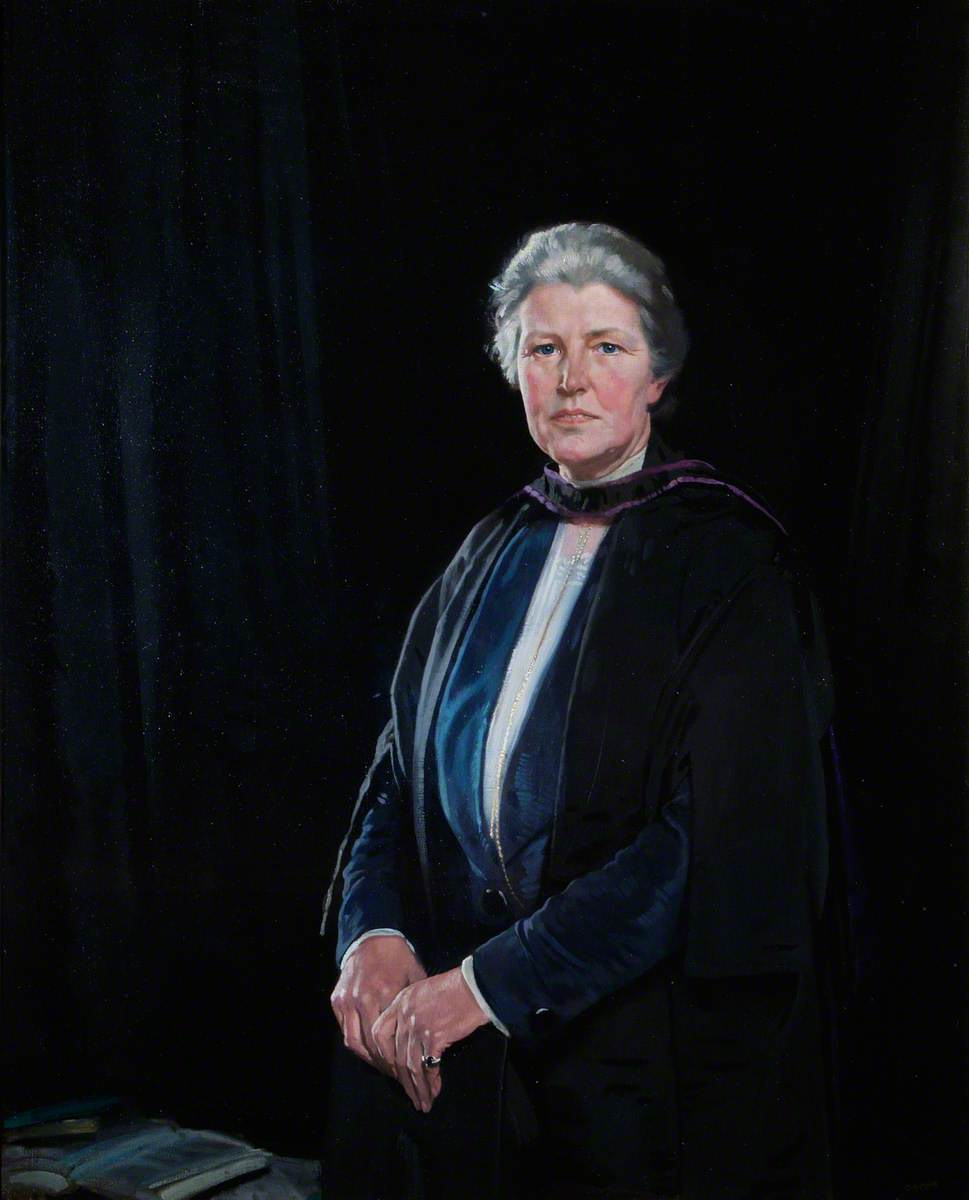
Portrait of Louisa Aldrich-Blake by William Orpen

Portrait of James Stevenson by Solomon Joseph Solomon

Portrait of Lady Stella Stevenson by Solomon Joseph Solomon

Portrait of Elizabeth Bowes-Lyon by John St Helier Lander

== See also ==
- Salon of 1923, held in Paris the same year

== Bibliography ==
- Goodman, Jean. AJ: The Life of Alfred Munnings. Erskine Press, 2019.
- McKonkey, Kenneth. Sir John Lavery. Canongate Press, 1993.
- Spalding, Frances. The Real and the Romantic: English Art Between Two World Wars Thames and Hudson, 2022.
- Upstone, Robert & Jenkins, David Fraser. William Orpen: Politics, Sex & Death. Philip Wilson, 2005.
