= Bearing Witness =

Bearing Witness may refer to:

- Bearing Witness (2005 film), a documentary by Barbara Kopple
- Bearing Witness to the October 7th Massacre, a compilation of footage produced by the IDF Spokesperson's Unit
- Bearing Witness (sculpture), an outdoor sculpture in Washington, D.C.
- "Bearing Witness", a 2007 song by Collective Soul from the album Afterwords
