= Pipes of Pan (disambiguation) =

Pan flute or pan pipe is an ancient musical instrument.

Pipes of pan may also refer to:

- The Pipes of Pan, a poem by Adrian Ross, set to music by Edward Elgar.
- The Pipes of Pan, a collection of verse by poet Bliss Carman
- The Pipes o' Pan, a 1914 silent drama film
- The Pipes of Pan (film), a 1923 British film directed by Cecil Hepworth
- The Pipes of Pan (painting), a painting during Pablo Picasso's neoclassical period
- Brian Jones Presents the Pipes of Pan at Joujouka, an album produced by Brian Jones
