= Aquis Submersus =

Painting by Max Ernst

- Artist: Max Ernst
- Year: 1919
- Medium: Oil on canvas
- Dimensions: 54 cm × 43.8 cm (21.26 in × 17.24 in)
- Location: Städelsches Kunstinstitut und Städtische Galerie, Frankfurt

Aquis Submersus (Latin for Drowned in the Waters) is an oil on canvas painting by the German dadaist and surrealist Max Ernst, created in 1919. Influenced by the Italian metaphysical art it is one of Ernst's earliest works showing surrealistic accents. It is held at the Städel Museum, in Frankfurt.

The painting depicts a swimming pool surrounded by buildings. The sense of dimension is unclear. The features of the buildings appear to be hand-drawn. The buildings leave shadows against the sky like a wall. Hanging in the sky is a clock that reflects on the water as a moon. In the pool, the picture shows a possibly female or childish body in an upside-down position with only the waist and legs above the water level. The person appears to be diving or is drowning. In the foreground is an armless statue-like figure that appears to have been made out of clay, throwing a shadow in the direction of the pool, similar to another shadow originating from outside the picture. The person looks away from the pool and bears a handlebar mustache resembling that of Ernst's father, but also has features which could be interpreted as female.

The painting carries the same name as a famous novella Aquis submersus by Theodor Storm, published in 1876, which influenced Ernst creating his painting.

== Sources ==
- The Guardian – Analysis of Pietà or Revolution by Night that describes Ernst's father.
