= Gertrude Harvey =

British artist (1879-1966)

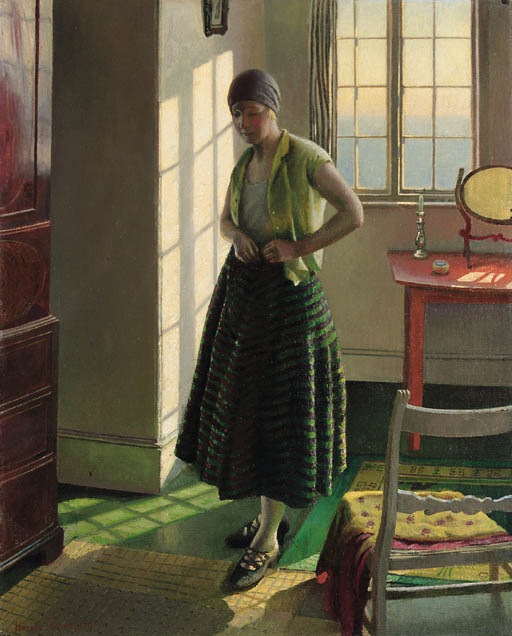
- Born: Gertrude Bodinnar; 1879; Cornwall, United Kingdom
- Died: 1966 (aged 86–87); St Just, Cornwall
- Known for: Painting
- Spouse: Harold Harvey

Gertrude Harvey (née Bodinnar, 1879–1966) was a British artist who was an active member of the Newlyn School of artists and a regular exhibitor at the Royal Academy.

== Biography ==
Gertrude Harvey was the eighth of the ten children born to Ann Crews Bodinnar, née Curnow, and her husband John Matthews Bodinnar, a cooper. Her maternal grandfather, William Curnow, was a market gardener and a notable botanist. Harvey acted as a model for students at the Forbes School of Painting in Newlyn and through the social scene associated with the School met Harold Harvey for whom she also modelled. The couple married in, or around, 1911 and set up home at Maen Cottage in Newlyn. Through modeling, Gertrude Harvey became fascinated by art and by the working methods of the artists based in Newlyn. Among those she modelled for were Laura Knight, Harold Knight and Ruth Simpson. Largely self-taught she became an accomplished artist in her own right, mainly painting still lifes, flowers and landscapes. Initially, Harvey exhibited and sold her oil paintings and other works through the local Newlyn Art Gallery but throughout the 1920s and 1930s exhibited in various London galleries. One of her London exhibitions, with a catalogue introduction by George Bernard Shaw, was a sell-out with every painting being purchased. As well as taking part in joint exhibitions with her husband, notably at the Leicester Galleries in 1918 and 1920, Harvey also exhibited works at the Royal Academy. Between 1930 and 1949, Harvey had twenty works selected for Royal Academy exhibitions. From 1945 to 1949 she was regular exhibitor with the St Ives Society of Artists.

After Harold Harvey died in 1941, Gertrude Harvey continued living at Maen Cottage until 1960, when she moved into a nursing home in St Just.
