= The Red Prince Mare =

Painting by Alfred Munnings

- Artist: Alfred Munnings
- Year: 1921
- Type: Oil on canvas, genre painting
- Dimensions: 101.6 cm × 152.4 cm (40.0 in × 60.0 in)
- Location: Private collection

The Red Prince Mare is a 1921 oil painting by the British artist Alfred Munnings. It depicts the mare Rosemary which belonged to his wife Violet, being saddled for a point-to-point race in England. The painting was displayed at the Salon of 1922 in Paris where it was awarded a gold medal. The picture was originally bought for a thousand guineas by Helen Hay Whitney and was later inherited by her son John Hay Whitney. In 2004 it was auctioned by Sotheby's in New York for $7.84 million, a record for a work by Munnings.

== Bibliography ==
- Baillio, Joseph. Alfred J. Munnings: Images of the Turf and Field. Wildenstein and Company, 1983.
- Cormack, Malcolm. Country Pursuits: British, American, and French Sporting Art from the Mellon Collections in the Virginia Museum Of Fine Arts. Virginia Museum of Fine Arts, 2007.
- Goodman, Jean. AJ: The Life of Alfred Munnings. Erskine Press, 2019.
