= Merry-Go-Round (Gertler painting) =

Painting by Mark Gertler

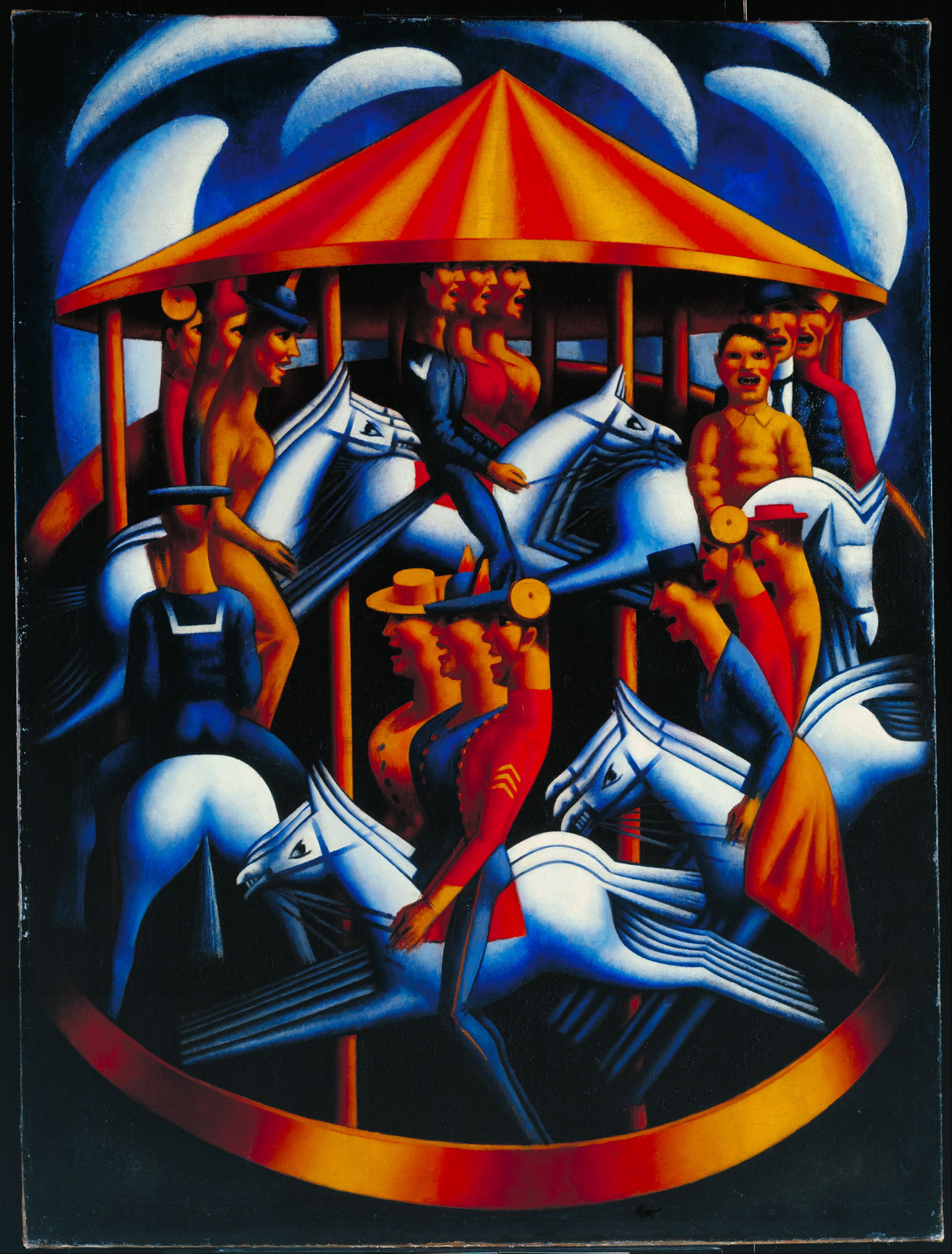
Mark Gertler, Merry-Go-Round, 1916. Tate Britain.

Merry-Go-Round is a large oil on canvas painting made by Mark Gertler in September 1916, when he was 24 years old. It is perhaps his most famous work, and depicts men and women (many in uniform) on a merry-go-round ride. The painting (and another 1915 painting entitled Swing Boats, now lost) may have been inspired by a ride at the annual fair on Hampstead Heath. The painting is now held in Tate Britain.

== Background ==
Gertler moved to Hampstead in north London in late 1914. A letter written by Gertler's friend D. H. Lawrence in September 1915 mentions wounded soldiers in uniforms enjoying the rowdy entertainment at the fair. Another letter by Lawrence in 1916 describes the painting as "the best modern picture I have seen: I think it is great and true".

The work in progress is mentioned in a letter sent by Gertler to Lytton Strachey in May 1916: "I am working very hard on a large and very unsaleable picture of Merry-Go-Round."

== Painting ==
The painting measures 189.2 × 142.2 centimetres (74.5 × 56.0 in). It depicts sixteen figures travelling on horseback around a fairground carousel, arranged in five groups of three plus a singleton. The figures resemble dolls, becoming abstracted into blocks of bright colours, with open mouths as if they are screaming. Some are in military uniforms and others in civilian clothes. The work takes inspiration from the Vorticist and Futurist works of David Bomberg and Christopher Nevinson.

== Reception ==
The painting was included in the London Group exhibition at the Mansard Gallery in April/May 1917 for the 6th exhibition of the group. It was interpreted as a deliberately "modern" and decorative work at the time, but is now seen as Gertler's visceral reaction to – and protest against – the First World War, perhaps triggered by the possibility that Gertler could be conscripted into the British Army. Gertler was a conscientious objector.

Expanding on the theme of war, the painting may represent the threefold colours of wholeness and balance in our Thinking, Feeling and Willing – within a human being. The four sets of people too suggest the balance between the masculine and feminine aspects within us; whilst the individual sailor is presented as the true unknown, unseen and rather elusive higher self. The continuous merry-go-round search for balance through the battle of suffering – as a strangely joyful part of the human Life.

Gertler was working on a sculpture version of Merry-Go-Round in 1916. The painting remained unsold during Gertler's lifetime. After his suicide in 1939 it was acquired by Leicester Galleries, who gave it to the Ben Uri Art Society in 1945. The Tate Gallery bought it from the Ben Uri Art Society in 1984.

== Legacy ==
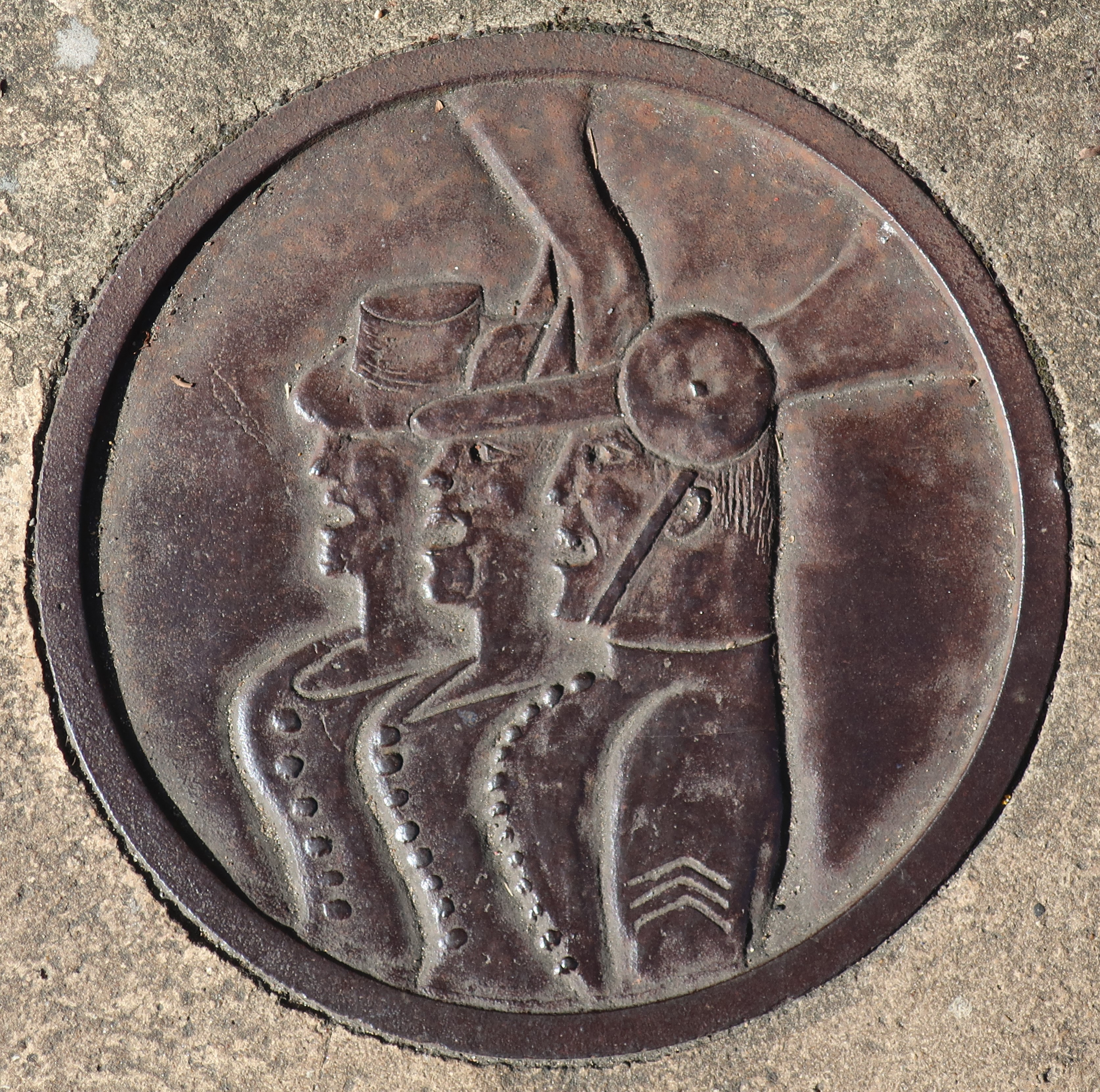
Roundel by Keith Bowler in Elder Street, Spitalfields, inspired by Merry-Go-Round

Merry-Go-Round inspired a scene in Joan Littlewood's 1963 stage musical Oh, What a Lovely War!, and in the 1969 film adaptation directed by Richard Attenborough.

A cast-iron roundel (or mock coal hole cover) depicting a detail from Merry-Go-Round is set into the pavement in front of Gertler's former home and studio at 32 Elder Street, Spitalfields, London. It was installed in 1995, and is one of a series of such roundels created by sculptor Keith Bowler to celebrate Spitalfields heritage.
