= Mark Gertler (artist) =

British artist (1891 - 1939)

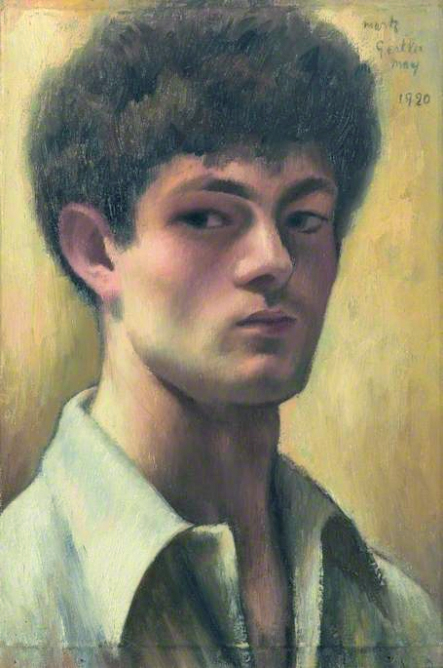
- Self-portrait (1920)
- Born: Marks Gertler; 9 December 1891; Spitalfields, London, England
- Died: 23 June 1939 (aged 47); Highgate, London, England
- Education: Regent Street Polytechnic; Slade School of Art
- Known for: Portrait painting
- Spouse: Marjorie Greatorex Hodgkinson

Mark Gertler (born Marks Gertler; 9 December 1891 – 23 June 1939) was a British painter of figure subjects, portraits and still-life.

His early life and his relationship with Dora Carrington were the inspiration for Gilbert Cannan's novel Mendel. The characters of Loerke in D. H. Lawrence's Women in Love, and Gombauld in Aldous Huxley's Crome Yellow were based on him.

== Early life ==
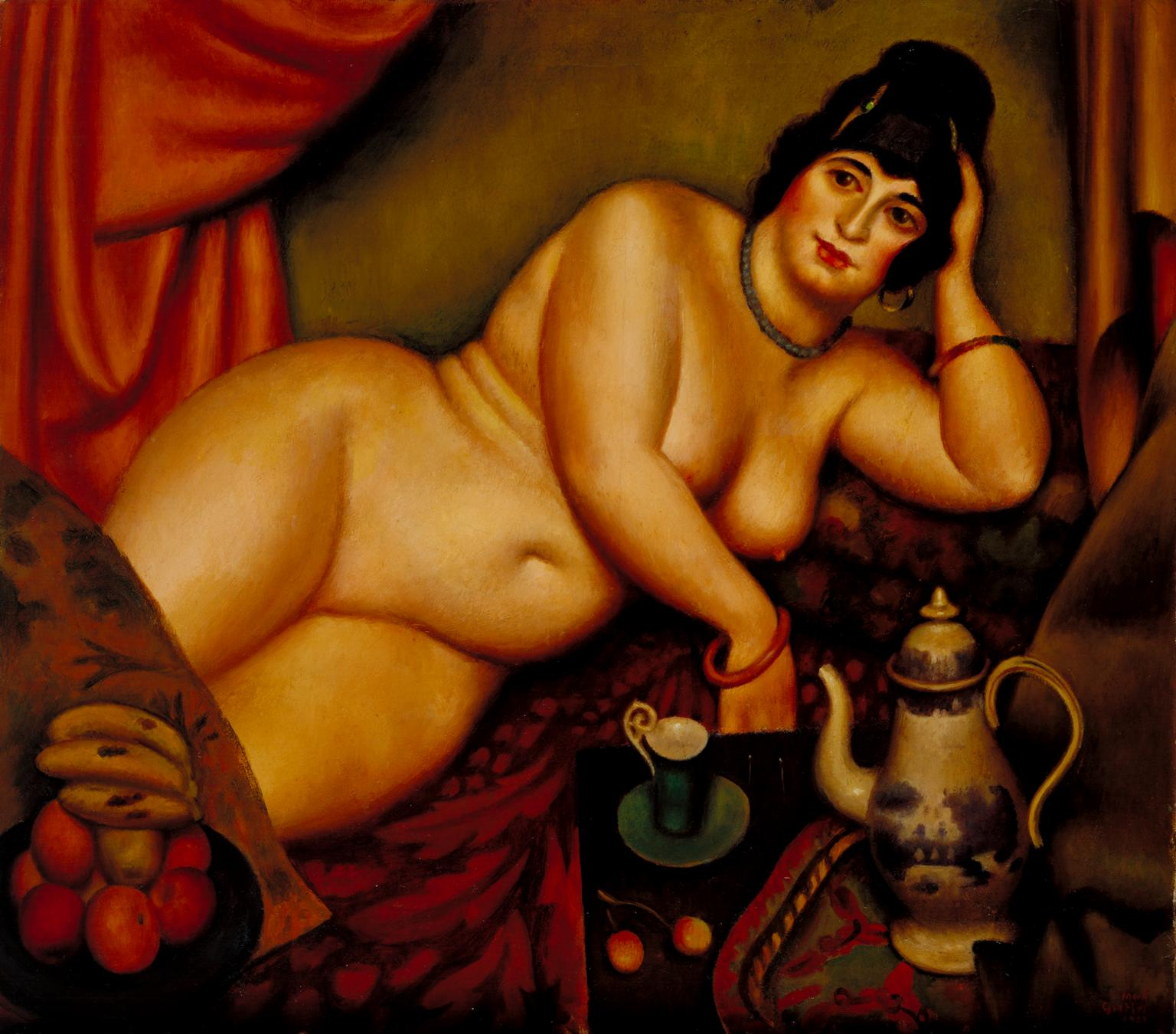
Queen of Sheba, 1922

Marks Gertler was born on 9 December 1891 in Spitalfields, London, the youngest child of Polish Jewish immigrants, Louis Gertler and Kate "Golda" Berenbaum. He had four older siblings: Deborah (b. 1881), Harry (b. 1882), Sophie (b. 1883) and Jacob "Jack" (b. 1886).

In 1892 his parents took the family to his mother's native city in Austrian Poland, Przemyśl, where they worked as innkeepers. Although Louis was popular with his customers, mainly Austrian soldiers, the inn was a failure. One night without telling anyone, Louis simply left for America (c.1893) in search of work. He eventually sent word to Golda telling her that once he was settled she was to bring the children to live with him there. However, this venture also failed and his family never joined him in America.

Instead Louis returned to Britain, and his family joined him in London in 1896, when Marks' forename was anglicised as "Mark".

From an early age, Gertler showed signs of a great talent for drawing. On leaving school in 1906, he enrolled in art classes at Regent Street Polytechnic. Due to his family's poverty, he was forced to drop out after a year, and in December 1907, he began working as an apprentice at Clayton & Bell, a stained glass company. He disliked his work there and rarely spoke of it in later years. While there, he attended evening classes at the Polytechnic. In 1908, Gertler was placed third in a national art competition and it inspired him to apply for a scholarship from the Jewish Education Aid Society (JEAS) to resume his studies as an artist. The application was successful. Upon the advice of the prominent Jewish artist William Rothenstein, he enrolled at the Slade School of Art in London in 1908. During the four years he spent at the Slade, Gertler was a contemporary of Paul Nash, Edward Wadsworth, C. R. W. Nevinson, Sir Stanley Spencer, Isaac Rosenberg, and Morris Goldstein, among others.

During his time at the Slade, Gertler met the painter Dora Carrington, whom he pursued relentlessly for many years. They had a brief sexual relationship during the years of the First World War. His obsessive love for Carrington is detailed in his published letters (see bibliography below) and in Sarah MacDougall's book Mark Gertler. It is also represented in the feature film Carrington (1995). His love for Carrington was unrequited, and she spent most of her life living with the homosexual author Lytton Strachey, with whom she was deeply in love. Carrington's unconventional relationship with Strachey, of whom Gertler was extremely jealous, and her eventual marriage to Ralph Partridge, destroyed her equally complex relationship with Gertler. He had been so distraught when he learned of Carrington's marriage that he tried to purchase a revolver and threatened to commit suicide.

== Career ==
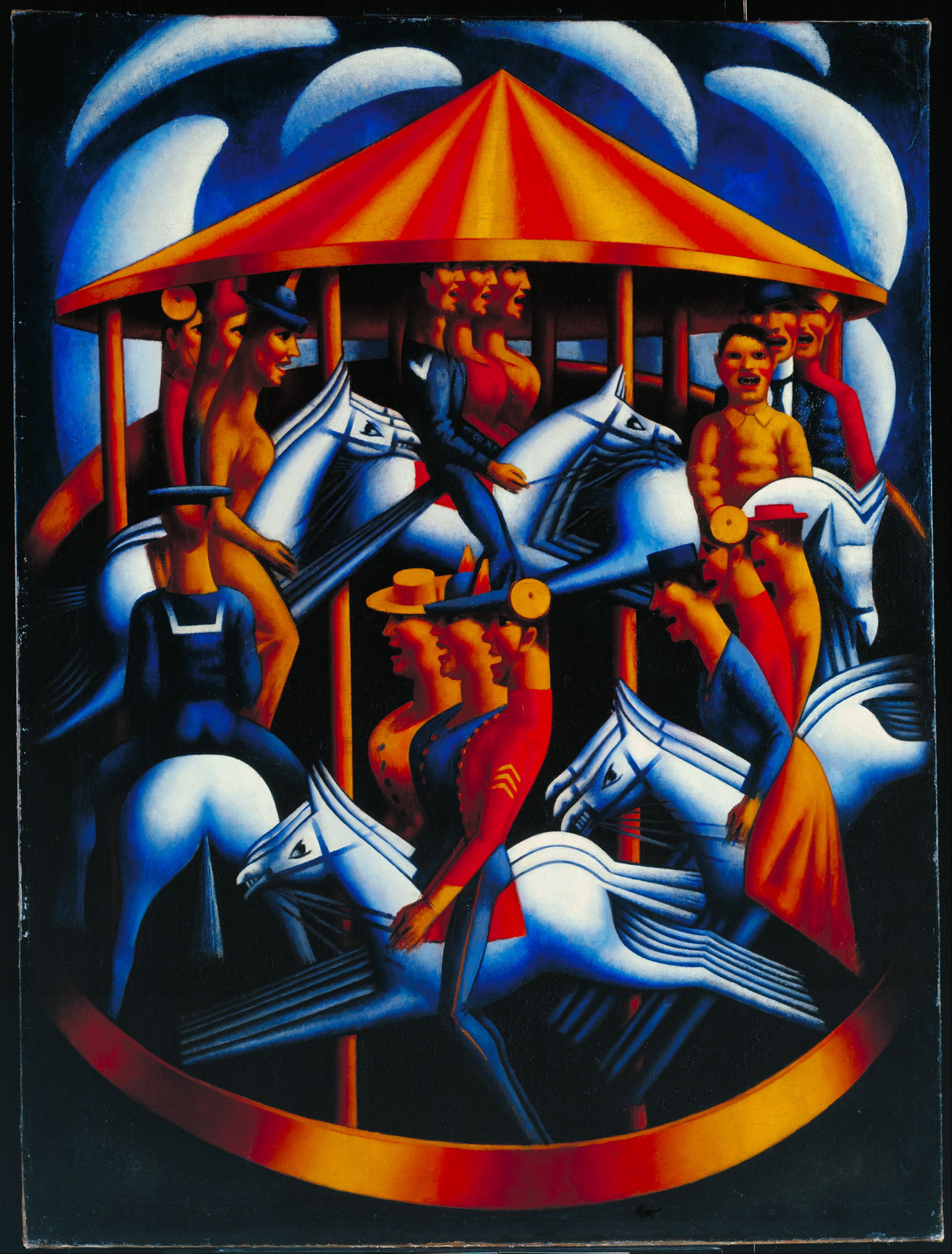
Merry-Go-Round, 1916

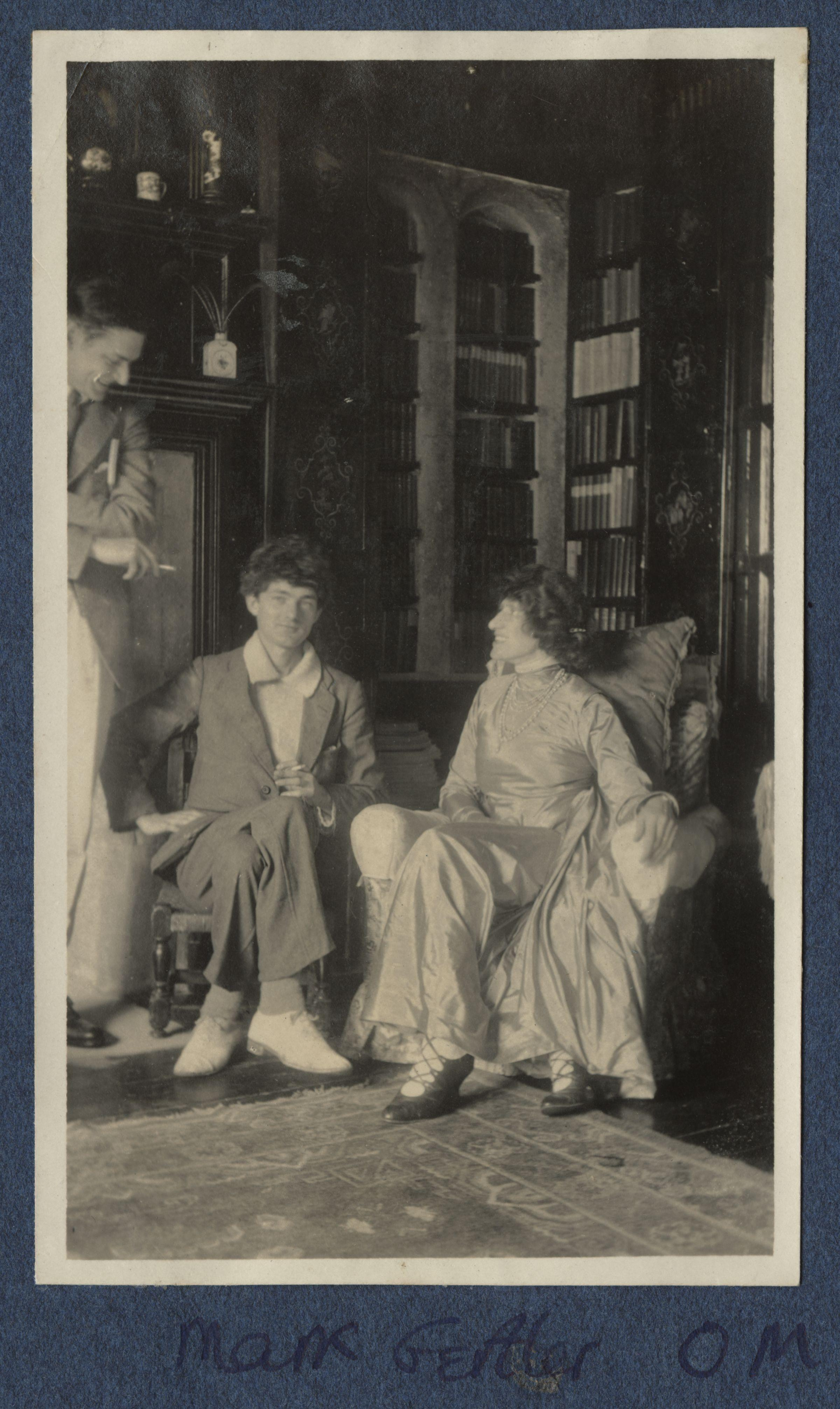
Mark Gertler with T. S. Eliot (left) and his patron Lady Ottoline Morrell

Gertler's patron was Lady Ottoline Morrell, through whom he became acquainted with the Bloomsbury Group. She introduced him to Walter Sickert, the nominal leader of the Camden Town Group. Gertler was soon enjoying success as a painter of society portraits, but his temperamental manner and devotion to advancing his work according to his own vision led to increasing personal frustration and the alienation of potential sitters and buyers. As a result, he struggled frequently with poverty.

In 1914, the art collector Edward Marsh became Gertler's patron. The relationship between the two men proved a difficult one as Gertler felt that the system of patronage and the circle in which he moved were in direct conflict with his sense of self. In 1916, as World War I dragged on, Gertler ended the relationship due to his pacifism and conscientious objection (Marsh was secretary to Winston Churchill and patron to some of the war poets). Gertler's major painting Merry-Go-Round was created in the midst of the war years and was described by D. H. Lawrence as "the best modern picture I have seen".

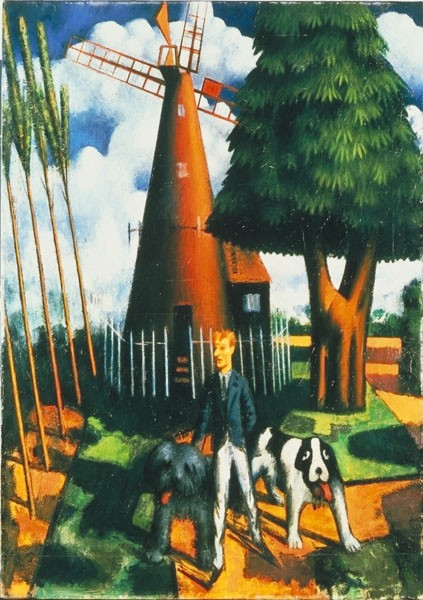
Gilbert Cannan at his Mill, 1916

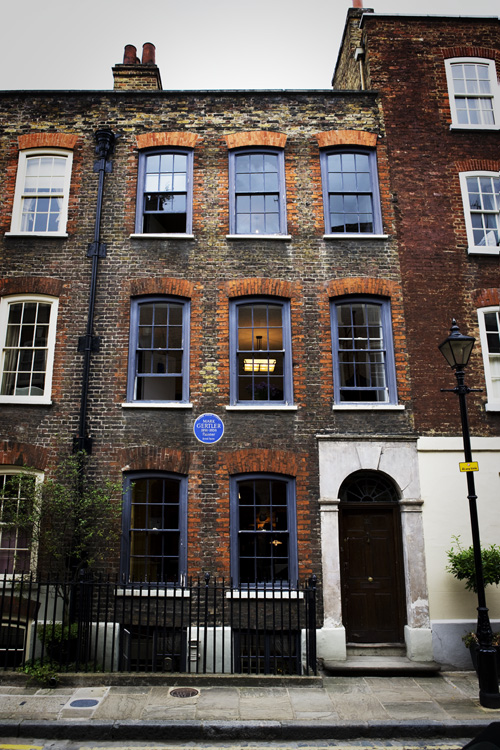
Gertler's former home at 32 Elder Street, Spitalfields, marked with a blue plaque in 1975 by the Greater London Council

In 1913, Gertler met the author and poet Gilbert Cannan, who later described him as "a small passionate man with green eyes". Cannan invited Gertler to stay with him and his wife Mary at their Mill House in Cholesbury, and the two men became friends. Gertler lived there on and off during 1915–1916, and he painted Gilbert Cannan at his Mill (now on view in the Ashmolean Museum in Oxford). The picture depicts Cannan outside the Mill with his two dogs. The black and white one, Luath, had been the inspiration for the dog Nana in the stage production of J. M. Barrie's Peter Pan. It was Cannan who was responsible for introducing Lady Ottoline Morrell to Gertler's paintings and encouraging her to support his work. Cannan closely based the young Jewish character of his 1916 novel Mendel on Gertler's early life, including his infatuation and affair with fellow artist Dora Carrington. This relationship remained unfulfilled as Carrington spurned his numerous advances and instead declared her love for Lytton Strachey. The friendship of Cannan and Gertler waned after 1916, largely because of Cannan's increasingly unstable behaviour.

Virginia Woolf recorded her impressions of Gertler after he came to visit her and her husband in Sussex in September 1918:

"Good God, what an egoist!" We have been talking about Gertler to Gertler for some 30 hours; it is like putting a microscope to your eye. One molehill is wonderfully clear; the surrounding world ceases to exist. But he is a forcible young man; if limited, able & respectable within those limits; as hard as a cricket ball; & as tightly rounded & stuffed in at the edges. We discussed—well, it always came back to Gertler. "I have a very peculiar character ... I am not like any other artist ... My picture would not have those blank spaces ... I don't see that, because in my case I have a sense which other people don't have ... I saw in a moment what she had never dreamt of seeing ..." & so on. And if you do slip a little away, he watches very jealously, from his own point of view, & somehow tricks you back again. He hoards an insatiable vanity. I suspect the truth to be that he is very anxious for the good opinion of people like ourselves, & would immensely like to be thought well of by Duncan [Grant], Vanessa [Bell] & Roger [Fry]. His triumphs have been too cheap so far. However this is honestly outspoken, & as I say, he has power & intelligence, & will, one sees, paint good interesting pictures, though some rupture of the brain would have to take place before he could be a painter.

Gertler's later works developed a sometimes very harsh edge, influenced by his increasing ill health. In 1920, he was diagnosed with tuberculosis, which forced him to enter a sanatorium on a number of occasions during the 1920s and 1930s. Two of Gertler's close friends, D. H. Lawrence and Katherine Mansfield, succumbed to the disease.

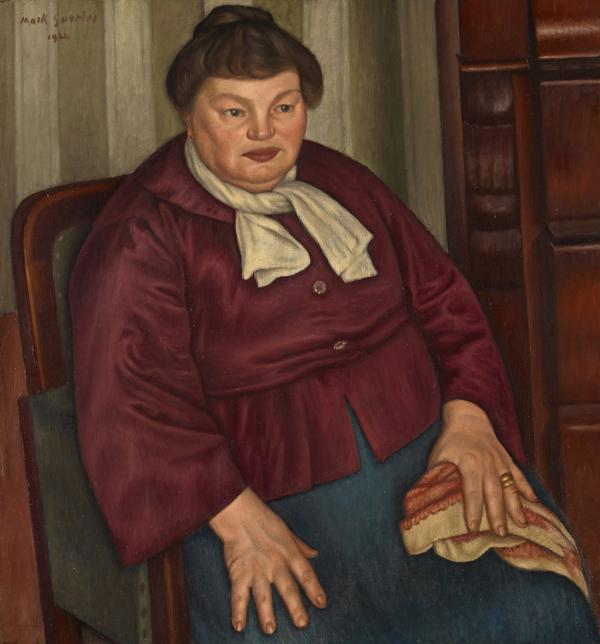
Gertler's portrait of his mother, Kate "Golda" Berenbaum Gertler, 1924

In 1930, Gertler married Marjorie Greatorex Hodgkinson, which resulted in the birth of a son, Luke Gertler, in 1932. The marriage was often difficult, punctuated by the frequent ill health of both, and with Gertler often suffering from the same feelings of constraint that destroyed his relationships with a number of friends and patrons.

During the 1930s, he became a part-time teacher at the Westminster School of Art in order to supplement his intermittent income from painting. He also undertook commercial work, including a series of posters for the Empire Marketing Board. A still-life design by him of a fruit bowl was among the winning entries in the 1933 Famous Artists competition run by Cadbury's for a series of chocolate box designs and which were displayed at the Leicester Galleries in London.

Gertler gassed himself in his studio at 5, Grove Terrace, Highgate, on 23 June 1939, having attempted suicide on at least one occasion in 1936. He was suffering from increasing financial difficulties, his wife had recently left him, he had held a critically derided exhibition at the Lefevre Gallery, he was still depressed over the death of his mother and Carrington's own suicide (both in 1932), and he was filled with fear over the imminent world war. He was buried at Willesden Jewish Cemetery.

He left a modest estate, valued at only £361, the administration of which was granted to his ex-wife, now remarried, Marjorie Greatorex Kostenz.

== Legacy ==
Gertler's obituary in The Times described his death as "a serious loss to British art. Opinions of his work are likely to vary", it conceded, "but it is safe to say that a considered list of the half-dozen most important painters under fifty working in England would include him". Gertler's paintings are held in numerous public art collections, including in the Glasgow Museums. In June 2015 his 1912 painting The Violinist was auctioned for £542,500 at Christie's, London, a record for the sale of his work.

Gertler's former house and studio in Elder Street, Spitalfields, bears a blue plaque erected by the Greater London Council in 1975. Set into the pavement in front of it is a cast-iron roundel created by sculptor Keith Bowler in 1995, depicting a detail from Gertler's Merry-Go-Round.

== Sources ==
- Bell, Anne Olivier, ed. (1977). The Diary of Virginia Woolf, Vol. I: 1915–1919. Hogarth / Harcourt Brace Jovanovich.
- Boulton, James T; Robertson, Andrew, eds. (2002). The Letters of D. H. Lawrence Parts 1 and 2: October 1916-June 1921 Pts.1 & 2: Volume 3. The Letters of D. H. Lawrence 8 Volume Set in 9 Paperback Pieces. Vol. 3. CUP. ISBN 978-0521006941. "{ii} 515; painted 'the best modern picture' DHL had seen [9 Oct 1916]"
- Carrington, Noel, ed. (1965). Mark Gertler: Selected Letters. with an introduction by Quentin Bell. Hart-Davis.
- Farr, Diana (1978). Gilbert Cannan: A Georgian Prodigy. Chatto & Windus. ISBN 978-0701122454.
- Haycock, David Boyd (2009). A Crisis of Brilliance: Five Young British Artists and the Great War. Old Street. ISBN 978-1905847846.
- Katz, Agi, ed. (1982). Mark Gertler: The Early and the Late Years (exhibition catalogue). Ben Uri Art Society.
- MacDougall, Sarah (2002). Mark Gertler. London: John Murray. ISBN 978-0719557996.
- MacDougall, Sarah (2008) [2004]. "Gertler, Mark (1891–1939)". Oxford Dictionary of National Biography (online ed.). Oxford University Press. doi:10.1093/ref:odnb/33379. (Subscription, Wikipedia Library access or UK public library membership required.)
- Maddra, Sam; Meacock, Joanna; Pearson, Lisa, eds. (2013). Glasgow Museums (Oil Paintings in Public Owner). Public Catalogue Foundation. ISBN 978-1904931812.
- Stevens, Micheline (2016). A biographical study of the early beneficiaries: The Jewish Education Aid Society (PDF) (PhD thesis). U Southampton.
- Woodeson, John (1971). Mark Gertler, 1891–1939 (exhibition catalogue). Colchester: The Minories.
- Woodeson, John (1972). Mark Gertler: biography of a painter, 1891–1939. London: Sidgwick and Jackson. ISBN 978-0283978319.
