= Queen of Sheba (painting) =

Painting by Mark Gertler

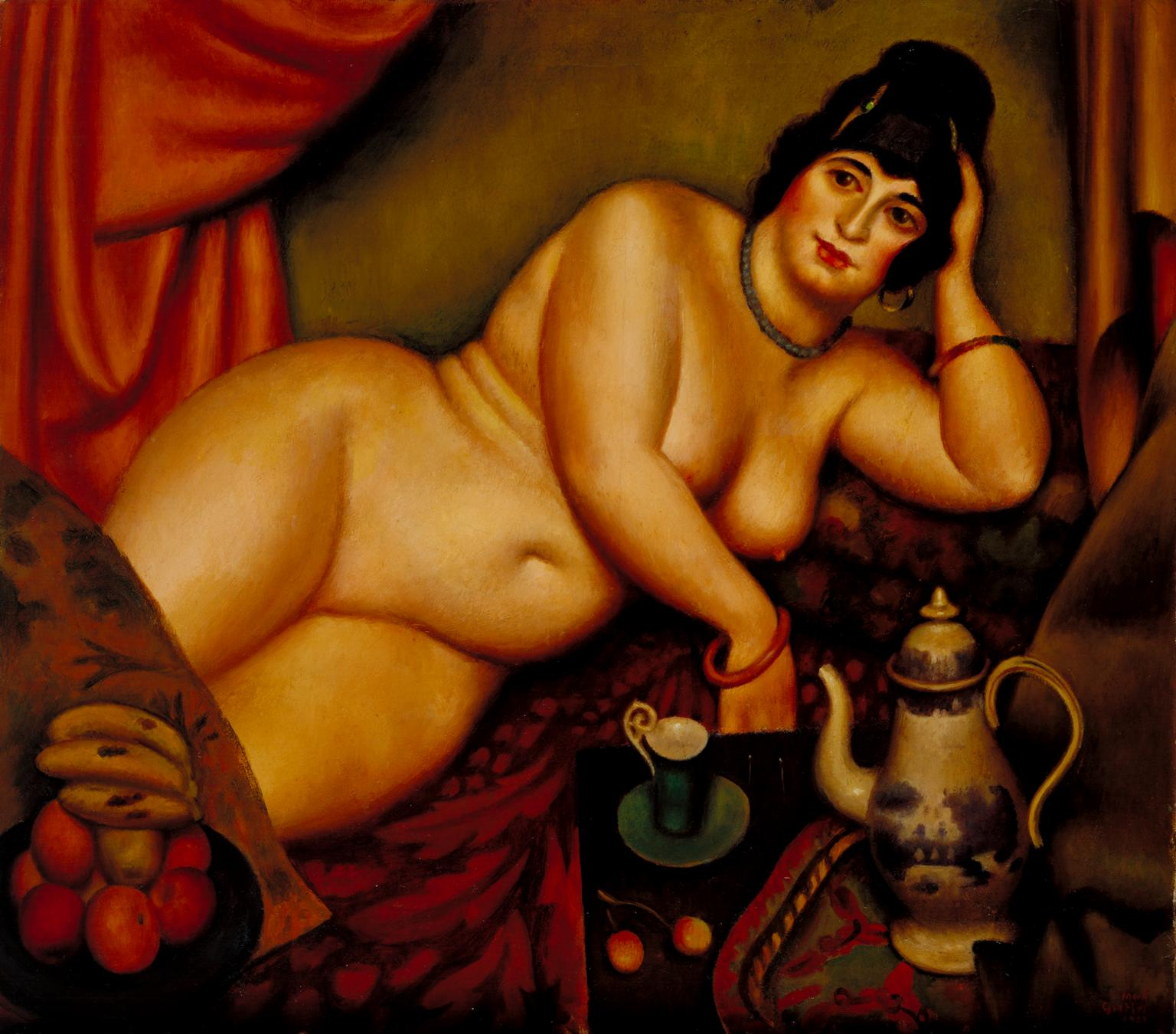
- Artist: Mark Gertler
- Year: 1922
- Type: Oil on canvas, nude art
- Dimensions: 94 cm × 107 cm (37 in × 42 in)
- Location: Tate Britain, London

Queen of Sheba is a 1922 oil painting by the British artist Mark Gertler. It depicts a nude woman. The title refers to the biblical Queen of Sheba, but has no clear connection to the painting other than providing a "grand historical lineage".

Gertler grew up in the East End of London and developed a reputation as a leading British modernist. However, after 1916 he showed a greater interest in the pre-Cubist period and this work reflects his admiration for Pierre-Auguste Renoir. The painting was displayed at an exhibition of the London Group in autumn 1922, where it was considered the "star of the show". The painting was purchased by the Tate Gallery in 1963, and is now in the collection of Tate Britain.

== Bibliography ==
- Corbett, David Peters. The Modernity of English Art, 1914–30. Manchester University Press, 1997.
- Keene, Alice. The Two Mr. Smiths; The Life and Work of Sir Matthew Smith, 1879–1959. Lund Humphries, 1995.
- Morphet, Richard. British Painting, 1910–1945. Tate Gallery Publications, 1967.
- Wolff, Janet. AngloModern: Painting and Modernity in Britain and the United States. Cornell University Press, 2003.
