= Salon of 1922 =

1922 art exhibition in Paris

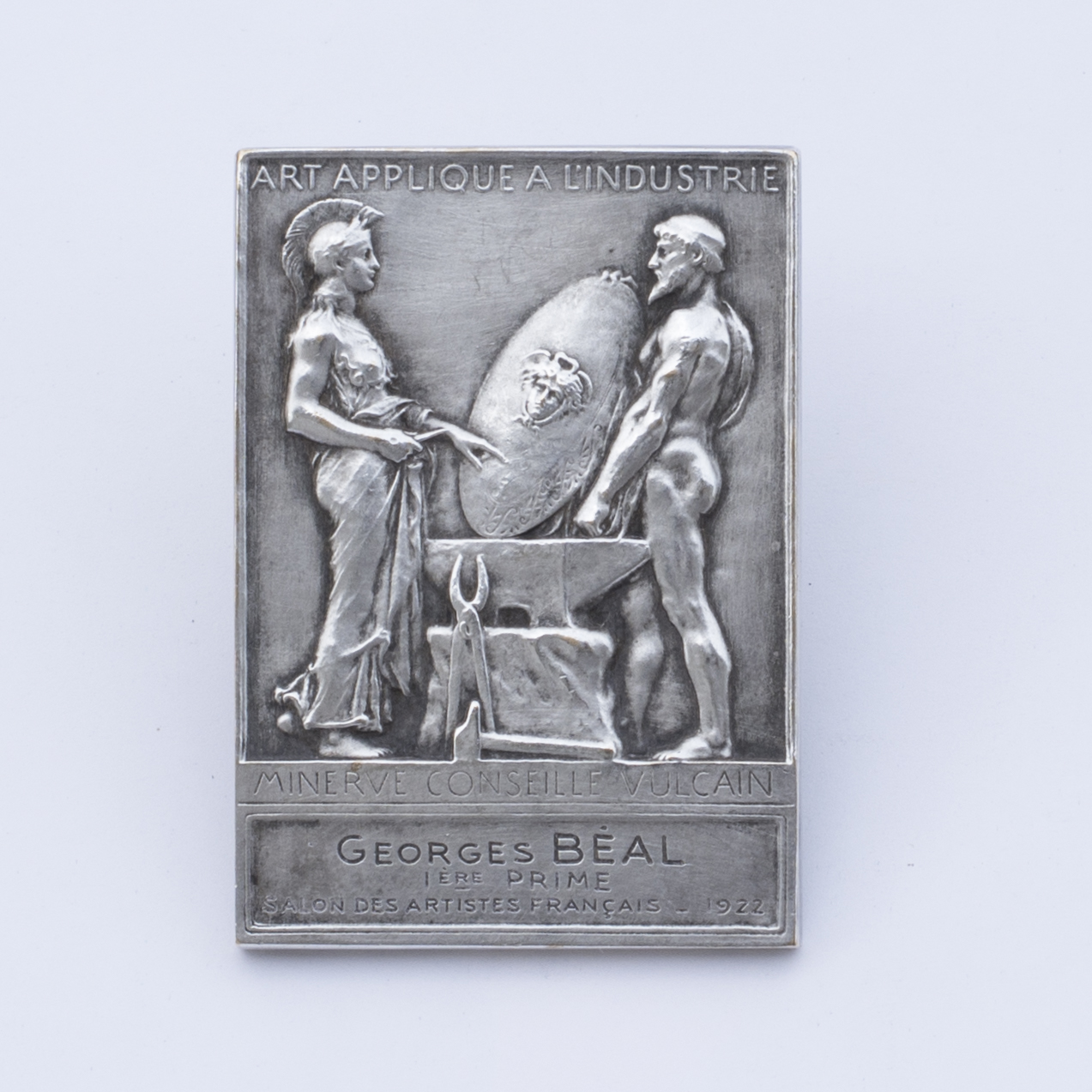
Silver medal awarded at the Salon

Official catalogue for the Salon

The Salon of 1922 was an art exhibition held at the Grand Palais in Paris between 30 April and 30 June 1922. It was organised by the Société des Artistes Français which in 1881 had replaced the Academy of Fine Arts as the organiser of the Salon whose history stretched back to 1667. It was the 135th edition of the official Salon. Since 1890 the Salon had been split following the establishment of the Société Nationale des Beaux-Arts, a breakaway rival organisation who also staged their own 1922 Salon. The Salon d'Automne, which featured more Modernist works, took place later in the year.

Many of the sculpture displays were commissioned war memorials commemorating the fallen of the First World War. The British artist Alfred Munnings was awarded a gold medal for his horseracing picture The Red Prince Mare which had sold for a thousand guineas the previous year.

== See also ==
- Royal Academy Exhibition of 1922, held at Burlington House in London

== Bibliography ==
- Sherman, Daniel J. The Construction of Memory in Interwar France. University of Chicago Press, 1999.
