= Bearing Witness (sculpture) =

1997 sculpture by Martin Puryear

- Artist: Martin Puryear
- Year: 1997
- Type: Sculpture
- Location: Washington, D.C., United States; 38.893635°N 77.029887°W

Bearing Witness is an outdoor 1997 sculpture by Martin Puryear, installed outside the Ronald Reagan Building and International Trade Center in Washington, D.C., in the United States. Twenty plus years after its construction the sculpture follows the characteristic style of Puryear and remains standing with minimal maintenance twenty plus years after its construction. The meaning of the sculpture is left up to interpretation, although many observers read into the inspirations Puryear may have had when designing the work.

== Design, installation, and maintenance ==
Constructed in 1997 for the Reagan Building following the GSA’s standard of spending 1% of a buildings construction budget commissioning an artwork, the sculpture stands forty feet tall and weighs an estimated 20,000 pounds. It cost one million dollars when commissioned, and remains the most expensive GSA commissioned artwork in D.C. It is constructed out of separate bronze sheets formed into a large vertical structure with one flat side and the other with a large bulb curve. The bronze sheets are held together by rivets into an interior, stainless steel armature. This structure is the result of a partnership between Puryear and a Rhode island based shipbuilding company which he worked with to construct the sculpture. At over twenty years old, the sculpture has required some light maintenance in order to conserve it. In a maintenance process conducted by the McKay Lodge Conservation team, a resin coating is applied to the several feet at the bottom of the sculpture, and a wax coating over the entire surface.

== Artist ==
Martin Puryear is a D.C. born artist known for his various abstract sculptures. Although his general expertise lies in woodworking, the all metal form of the sculpture “Bearing Witness” is one of a few that diverge from this background, such as his all brick sculpture “by Way of Africa”. Despite the change in medium, the sculpture still bears the abstract and minimalistic style that characterizes Puryear’s work, intentionally designing his sculptures to avoid forcing a rigid narrative on the audience. While leaving it open to interpretation, Puryear has confirmed some of the intent behind his sculpture, purposely selecting the location and orienting the sculpture outward from the Reagan Center. Mindful of the political and government setting the sculpture would be placed into, Puryear has commented the orientation facing away from the building represents how within a democracy “people talk back to the government”.

== Reception ==
Despite its size and prominent location “Bearing Witness” has been the focus of minimal criticism, aside from general criticism over the extensive costs of GSA funded artwork. It is colloquially referred to as “the thumb” by locals, and is the site of occasional concerts, art “jams”, and food tabling. Many observers connect the form of the sculpture to that of a head, or possibly a fang mask, which inspired many of Puryear’s other artworks. Art critic David Levi-Strauss makes the claim that the sculpture is inspired by the head of Puryear’s daughter, Sasha.

== See also ==
- 1997 in art
- List of public art in Washington, D.C., Ward 6
