= The Prodigal Son (Giorgio de Chirico) =

Painting by Giorgio de Chirico

- Il figliol prodigo (Italian)
- Artist: Giorgio de Chirico
- Year: 1922
- Medium: Tempera on canvas
- Dimensions: 87 cm × 59 cm (34 in × 23 in)
- Location: Museo del Novecento, Milan

The Prodigal Son (Italian: Il figliol prodigo) is a painting by the Greek-born Italian artist Giorgio de Chirico. It is painted in tempera on canvas and was completed in 1922 as de Chirico was in transition from the Metaphysical style of his earlier works to the neoclassicism he essayed in the 1920s. The biblical subject matter is interpreted by de Chirico as a stone effigy of a father placing his hand on the shoulder of a mannequin representing the son. The dimensions of the painting are 87 by 59 centimeters. It is housed at Museo del Novecento, Milan, Italy.
