= The Savior of Painting =

1997 painting by Odd Nerdrum

- Artist: Odd Nerdrum
- Year: 1997
- Medium: Oil on canvas
- Dimensions: 258 cm × 202 cm (102 in × 80 in)
- Location: Private collection

The Savior of Painting is a 1997 painting by the Norwegian artist Odd Nerdrum. It is also known as Self-Portrait as the Prophet of Painting. It depicts Nerdrum in a golden robe, standing barefoot under the evening sky, with a paintbrush in his right hand and a palette in his left.

Nerdrum has described the painting as "kitsch in its purest form", making a distinction between kitsch, which always is seriously intended, and camp, which is ironic.

== Creation ==
The painting was made at Røvik gård in Stavern. The model was Arne Aakermann, whose height and posture were similar to Nerdrum's. Aakermann modeled for two hours every day during three months in the summer of 1997. The custom-made robe was also used in Nerdrum's 1997 painting Self-Portrait in Golden Cape, where the artist is depicted with an erected penis. The model was however not the same in the two paintings.

== Reception ==
Reviewing a 1999 exhibition of Nerdrum's self-portraits in New York City, Ken Johnson of The New York Times wrote that the paintings overall only succeeded to "envelop the artist in a stale aura of quasi-Rembrandtian soulfulness". One exception was "Self-Portrait as the Prophet of Painting, in which the artist appears life-size in a floor-length, pearl-studded golden robe, brush and palette in his hands, against a romantically barren rocky shore and a twilit sky. In this goofy, over-the-top image, Mr. Nerdrum seems to be having some fun with his own self-glorifying predilections."

In 2012, it was selected by the magazine American Artist as one of "7 important paintings of our time". The magazine described it as "boldly presumptuous" and "one of few paintings in Nerdrum's oeuvre devoid of tension, angst, or torment. That is because the artist portrayed here is triumphant—he has overcome the accusations and criticism of his public and stands confidently poised to save art from its so-called imminent doom."
