= Kilkenny Horse Fair =

Painting by Alfred Munnings

- Artist: Alfred Munnings
- Year: 1922
- Type: Oil on canvas, genre painting
- Dimensions: 64.3 cm × 76.9 cm (25.3 in × 30.3 in)
- Location: Royal Academy, London

Kilkenny Horse Fair is a 1922 oil painting by the British artist Alfred Munnings. It depicts a horse fair in County Kilkenny. It is painted in the British impressionist style the Suffolk-born Munnings was noted for. Munnnings displayed the painting at the Royal Academy Exhibition of 1923 at Burlington House in London. When Munnings was elected to full membership of the Royal Academy in 1925 he was required to submit a diploma work and presented this. It was displayed again at the Royal Academy Exhibition of 1926. Munnings also produced another, very different version in 1922 which features St Mary's Cathedral in Kilkenny city in the background.

== Bibliography ==
- Goodman, Jean. AJ: The Life of Alfred Munnings. Erskine Press, 2019.
- McGrath, Mary & Griffith, Joan C. The Irish Draught Horse: A History. Collins, 2005.
