= Portrait of Roland Knoedler =

Painting by William Orpen

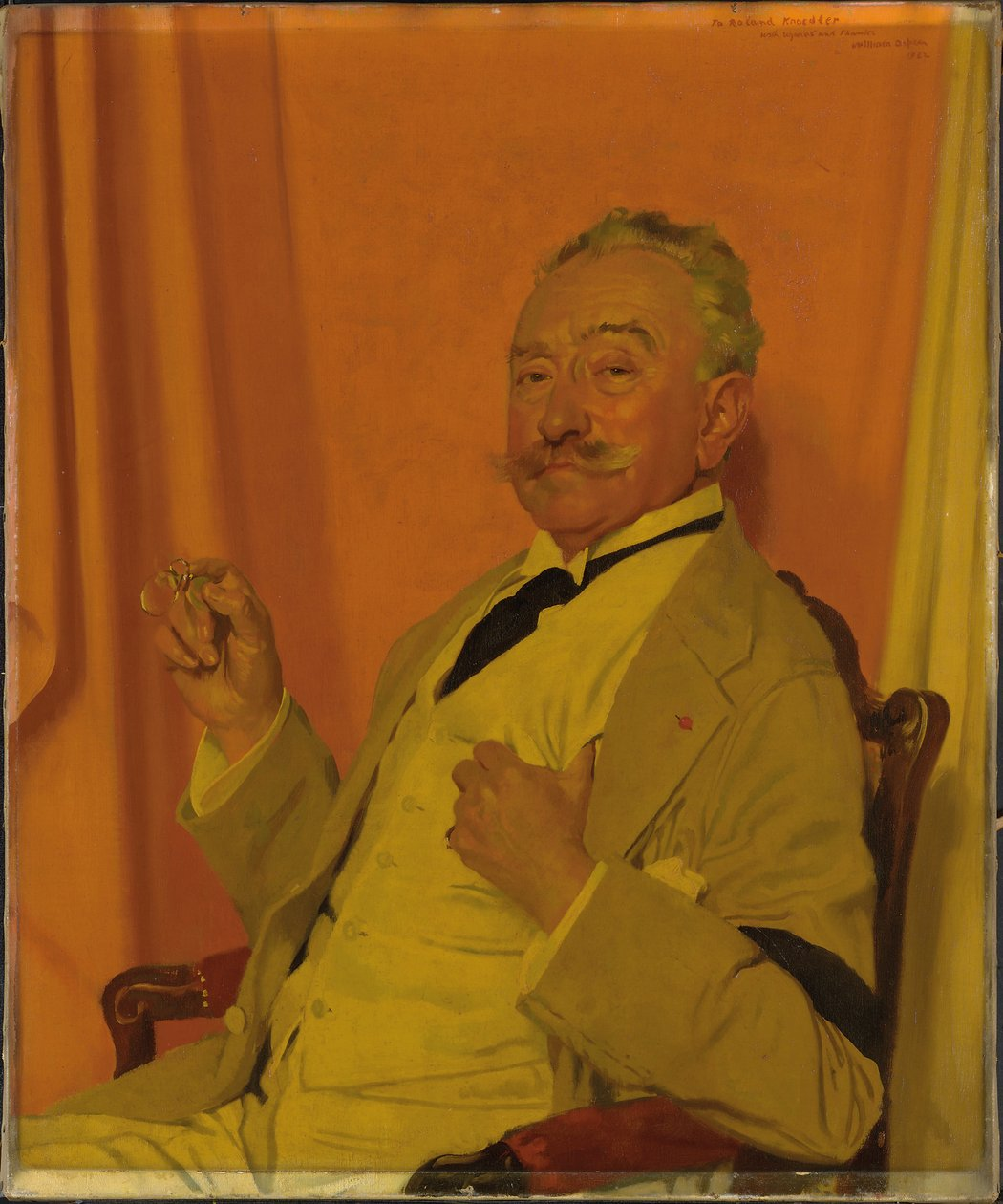
- Artist: William Orpen
- Year: 1922
- Type: Oil on canvas, portrait painting
- Dimensions: 91.4 cm × 76.8 cm (36.0 in × 30.2 in)
- Location: Private collection

Portrait of Roland Knoedler is a 1922 portrait painting by the Irish artist William Orpen. It depicts the American Roland Knoedler, a prominent figure in the art world. He headed the New York-based art dealership Knoedler as it expanded to become a major force in the international art market. Orpen presents Knoedler as a dapper figure om a striking yellow-dominated composition holding a pair of pince-nez. Knoelder's connection with the artist stretched back to 1910 when the company had bought a self-portrait by Orpen. The painting was displayed at the Royal Academy Exhibition of 1923 held at Burlington House in London. It was auctioned by Christie's for £215,000 in 2005.

== See also ==
- List of paintings by William Orpen

== Bibliography ==
- Arnold, Bruce. Orpen: Mirror to an Age. Jonathan Cape, 1981.
- Upstone, Robert & Jenkins, David Fraser. William Orpen: Politics, Sex & Death. Philip Wilson, 2005.
