= The Red Rose (painting) =

Painting by John Lavery

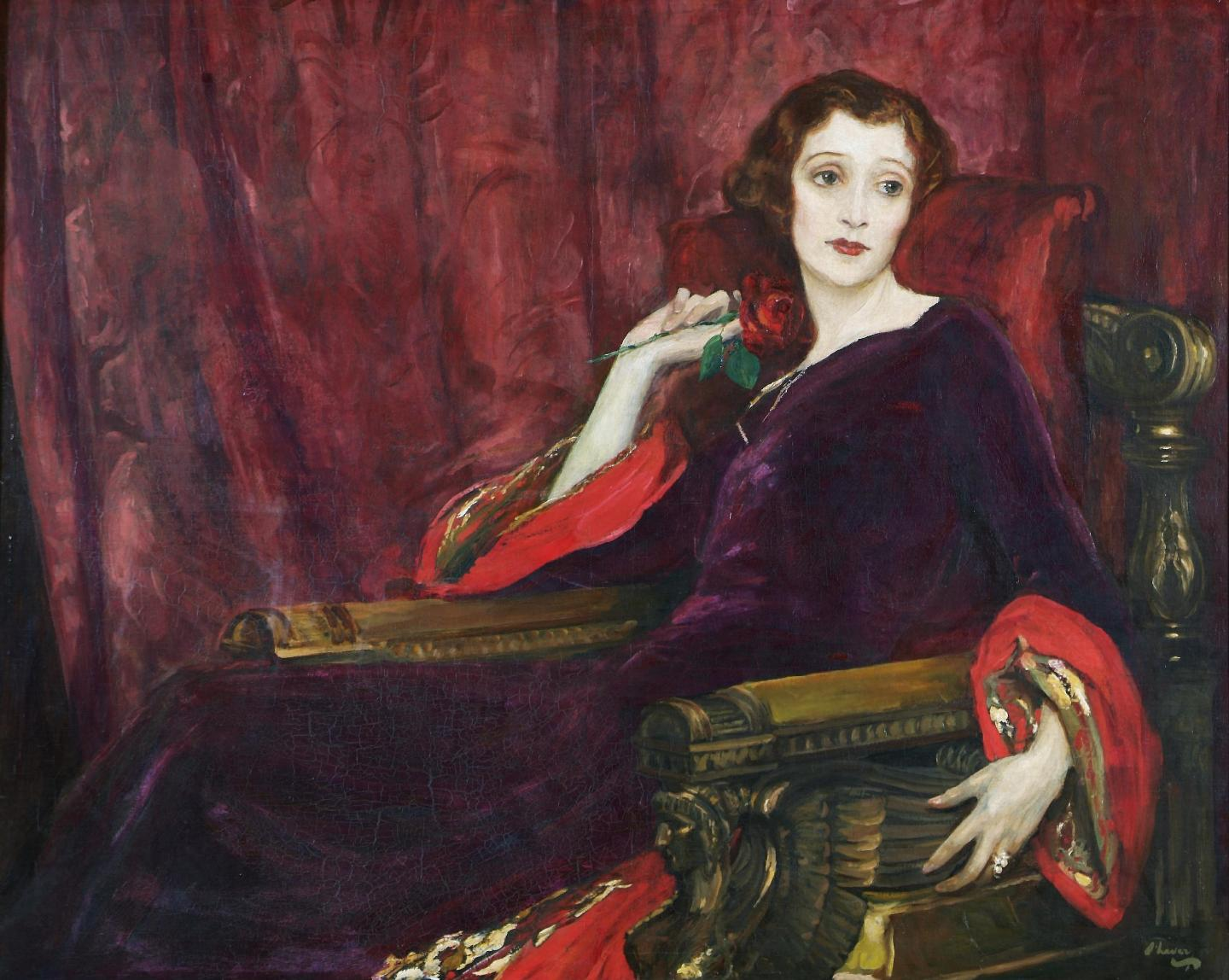
- Artist: John Lavery
- Year: 1923
- Type: Oil on canvas, portrait painting
- Dimensions: 102.3 cm × 128 cm (40.3 in × 50 in)
- Location: Crawford Art Gallery, Cork

The Red Rose is a 1923 oil painting by the Irish artist John Lavery. It depicts the artist's wife Hazel Lavery seated clutching a red rose. The American Hazel Lavery was a notable figure in London society and also served as the model for the figure on banknotes for the Irish Free State.

The Belfast-born Lavery had come to fame as part of the Glasgow Boys and became a leading figure in the British Impressionist movement He had served as a war artist during the First World War and was knighted in 191l8. The painting was displayed at the Royal Academy Exhibition of 1923 held at Burlington House in London. It is now owned by the Crawford Art Gallery in Cork which acquired it in 1925. The canvas was reused and painted over from an earlier vertical portrait.

== Bibliography ==
- McConkey, Kenneth. Sir John Lavery. Canongate Press, 1993.
- McCoole, Sinéad. Hazel: A Life of Lady Lavery 1880-1935. Lilliput Press, 2015.
