= Edwin Romanzo Elmer =

American painter

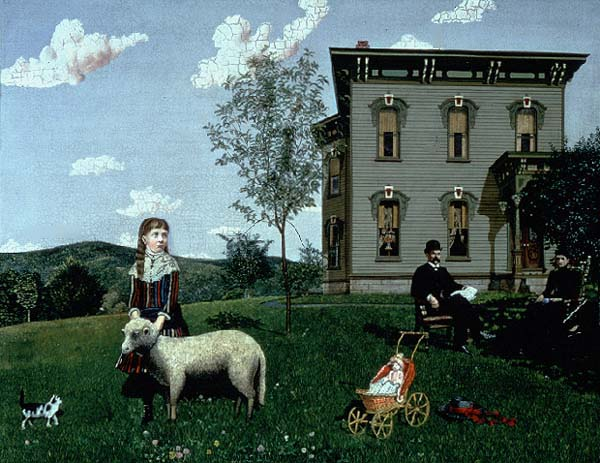
Edwin Romanzo Elmer, Mourning Picture (1890. Smith College Museum of Art, Northampton, MA)

Edwin Romanzo Elmer (1850–1923) was an American artist who painted portraits, genre and still life scenes. He was also an inventor of a machine for braiding horsewhips.

Spending most of his life in Ashfield, Massachusetts, Elmer is best known for his painting Mourning Picture. This 1890 family portrait depicts the artist, his wife, and their daughter Effie who had died shortly before it was painted. The painting is noted for its crisp detail and contrast between the mourning family, who sit in relative darkness, and the dead daughter, who is bathed in sunlight. It was first displayed in a local post office in 1890. A niece of the artist donated the painting as a bequest to the Smith College Museum of Art, where it now resides.

The poet Adrienne Rich wrote a poem about Mourning Picture from the deceased daughter's point of view.
