= My Kitchen (painting) =

Painting by Harold Harvey

- Artist: Harold Harvey
- Year: 1923
- Type: Oil on canvas, genre painting
- Dimensions: 100.5 cm × 75.5 cm (39.6 in × 29.7 in)
- Location: Gallery Oldham, Greater Manchester

My Kitchen is a 1923 oil painting by the British artist Harold Harvey. A genre painting it depicts the interior of a domestic kitchen with a variety of objects including a lobster. Harvey was a key member of the Newlyn School of artists, based in Cornwall. The painting was displayed at the Royal Academy Exhibition of 1923 held at Burlington House in London. It was acquired the following year by Oldham Museum and Art Gallery, purchased directly from the artist.

== Bibliography ==
- Fox, Caroline & Greenacre, Francis. Painting in Newlyn, 1880-1930. Barbican Art Gallery, 1985.
- Jenkins, Adrian & Whittle, Stephen. Creative Tension: British Art, 1900–1950. Paul Holberton, 2005.
- McConkey, Kenneth. Impressionism in Britain. Yale University Press, 1995.
- McConkey, Kenneth, Risdon, Peter & Sheppard, Pauline. Harold Harvey: Painter of Cornwall. Sansom & Company, 2001.
