= World War I Memorial (Tiruchirappalli) =

World War I Memorial in Tiruchirappalli

- Tiruchirappalli Municipal Corporation
- For soldiers from Trichinopoly who died during World War I
- Unveiled: 1919
- Location: 10.8155°N 78.6967°E; Opposite Gandhi Market, Tiruchirappalli
- Commemorated: 41

World War I Memorial, located opposite to Gandhi Market, Tiruchirappalli in the state of Tamil Nadu, India, is a war memorial dedicated to the soldiers of Trichinopoly.

== History ==
About 302 soldiers from Trichinopoly participated in World War I as a part of British Indian Army, of which 41 died during the course of war. In remembrance of those soldiers, the then government erected a memorial with a huge clock in it.

== Maintenance ==
The memorial which was also popularly known as "Clock Tower", was languishing without much maintenance. During the mean time, about 25 traders, including Burmese refugees, put up their shop and began to occupy the spaces around the memorial, which left unchecked became as hindrance in viewing and visiting the memorial. After many years of wait, on 27 February 2013 the city corporation decided to revamp the structure after persistent demands from Ex–servicemen personnels and other service organisation to cancel the licence and demolish the shops (excluding the ones run by Burmese refugees) and other structures around the memorial.

== See also ==
- India Gate
