= The Pipes of Pan (painting) =

Painting by Pablo Picasso

- Artist: Pablo Picasso
- Year: 1923
- Medium: Oil-on-canvas
- Dimensions: 205 cm × 174 cm (81 in × 69 in)
- Location: Musée Picasso, Paris

The Pipes of Pan (French: La flûte de Pan) is an oil-on-canvas by Spanish artist Pablo Picasso. Painted in 1923 during Picasso's classical period, the painting depicts two statuesque men of mythological origins. Frequently acknowledged to be his cornerstone work during this era, the painting makes use of a large canvas and a classical color palette that are acutely reminiscent of the ancient world. The subjects which Picasso chooses to explore within this work– male Greek youth, musical pipes, as well as the Mediterranean setting– all hark back to classical ancient art.

== Background ==
This work was painted at the crux of Picasso's classical period from 1919 to 1929, in which he was greatly intrigued by classical art. At the time that he had painted The Pipes of Pan, Picasso was traveling extensively in Italy, and consequently drew inspiration for this painting in the Greco-Roman art he found there. His admiration for such is evident in the pensive and motionless way he portrays his subjects, as well as the tactile yet unembellished background. Additionally, the subjects themselves are Greek by nature– the pipes held by the figure on the right are a clear reference to the pipes of Pan, the personified Greek god of “life in the periphery”– who essentially functions as the embodiment of peripheral attitude (free-ranging, and lustful but frustrated) and pastoral life. The setting of the painting, too, is evidently Mediterranean by its sunny blue background.

== Controversy ==
There has been controversy regarding the "true nature" of the picture's subject. At the time of its painting, Picasso, who was deep into his fascination with classical art, met Sara Murphy in 1921. She was a beautiful and wealthy American expatriate who became flirtatiously involved with Picasso, their relations leading all the way up to the conception of this painting. Infrared photographs of The Pipes of Pan taken in the 1990s revealed an initial composition that included four total figures. Many art scholars believe that one figure was to be Venus, depicted as Sara, and that another figure was to be Mars, depicted as Picasso. However, a possible reason why this initial idea was scrapped was because Picasso's infatuation came to a head– perhaps Sara rejected him, and so he erased her from the painting composition.
