= Pietà or Revolution by Night =

Painting by Max Ernst

- Artist: Max Ernst
- Year: 1923
- Medium: Oil on canvas
- Dimensions: 116.2 cm × 88.9 cm (45 3/4 in × 35 in)
- Location: Tate Gallery; London

Pietà or Revolution by Night (Pietà ou La révolution la nuit) (1923) is a painting by German surrealist and Dadaist Max Ernst. Since 1981 it has been part of the collection of the Tate Gallery in London.

The painting is interpreted as symbolic of the turbulent relationship between the artist and his father, as an amateur painter and staunch Catholic. In the painting, Ernst replaces the classic image of the Virgin Mary holding the crucified body of Jesus (pietà) with his father as Mary and the artist himself as Jesus. The expressions on both faces are blank as though in a state of sleepwalking.

In the background drawn on a wall is a man with a bandaged head ascending a flight of stairs. A profile on the work in the British newspaper The Guardian indicates the figure could represent either Sigmund Freud or the French poet Guillaume Apollinaire, who suffered a head wound during World War I.

Pietà or Revolution by Night is an example of the early period of the surrealist movement. Its title reflects the revolutionary sentiments of the movement, and in particular of its founder, André Breton. This image is notable for its combination of heavily textured surfaces and sharp, hand-drawn outlines.

== Sources ==
- The Guardian
- The Tate Gallery
