= Harold Harvey (artist) =

English painter

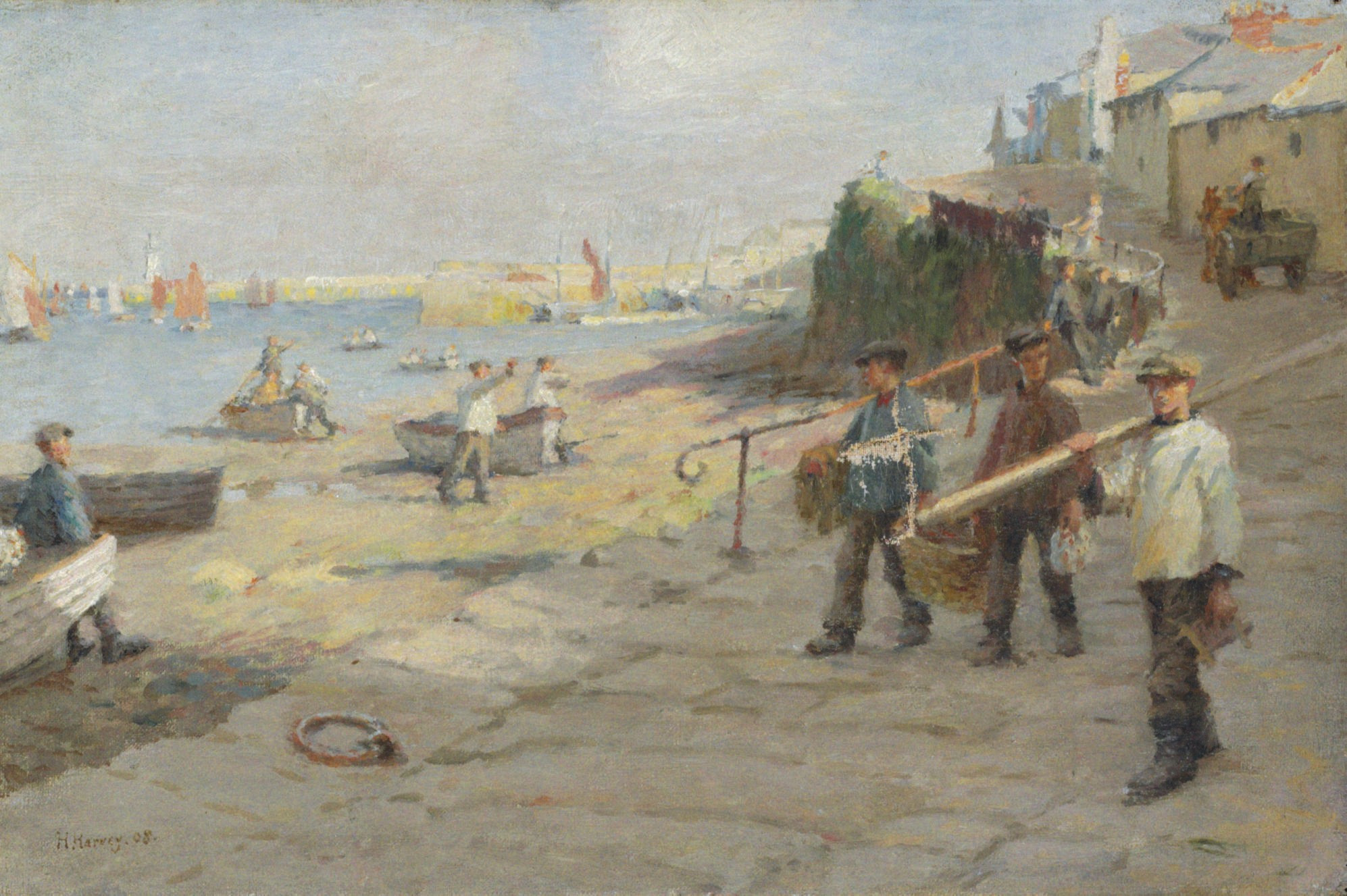
- The Old Slip, Newlyn; by Harold Harvey
- Born: Harold Charles Francis Harvey; 20 May 1874; Penzance, Cornwall
- Died: 19 May 1941 (aged 66); Newlyn, Cornwall
- Education: Penzance School of Arts; Académie Julian; Académie Delécluse; Académie Colarossi
- Known for: Painter
- Spouse(s): Gertrude Harvey, née Bodinnar (1879–1966)
- Patrons: Norman Garstin

Harold Harvey (1874–1941) was a Newlyn School painter who painted scenes of working-class Cornish fishermen, farmers and miners and Cornish landscapes. He was born in Penzance and trained at the Penzance School of Arts under Norman Garstin and the Académie Julian in Paris (1894–1896).

== Private life ==
Harold Charles Francis Harvey was born to Mary Bellringer Harvey and Francis McFarland Harvey on 20 May 1874 in Penzance. His father was a bank clerk. During his youth, he was home schooled. From 1894 to 1896, he studied art at the Académie Julian in Paris under Norman Garstin. In 1896, he studied at both the Académie Delécluse and the Académie Colarossi.

Prior to 1911, Harvey lived in Penzance. In 1911, Harvey married fellow artist Gertrude Bodinnar. They first met when Gertrude posed for Harvey. She discovered that she had artistic talent and became an artist in her own right in a wide range of visual and textile arts. The married couple lived in Newlyn at Maen Cottage. Friends of the Harveys included Laura Knight, Harold Knight, Annie Walke, and Father Bernard Walke of St Hilary Church.

Late in his life, he converted to Catholicism. He died in Newlyn on 19 May 1941 and was buried in Penzance at the St Clare Cemetery. Gertrude lived in their cottage until 1960 when she moved into a St Just nursing home. She died six years later.

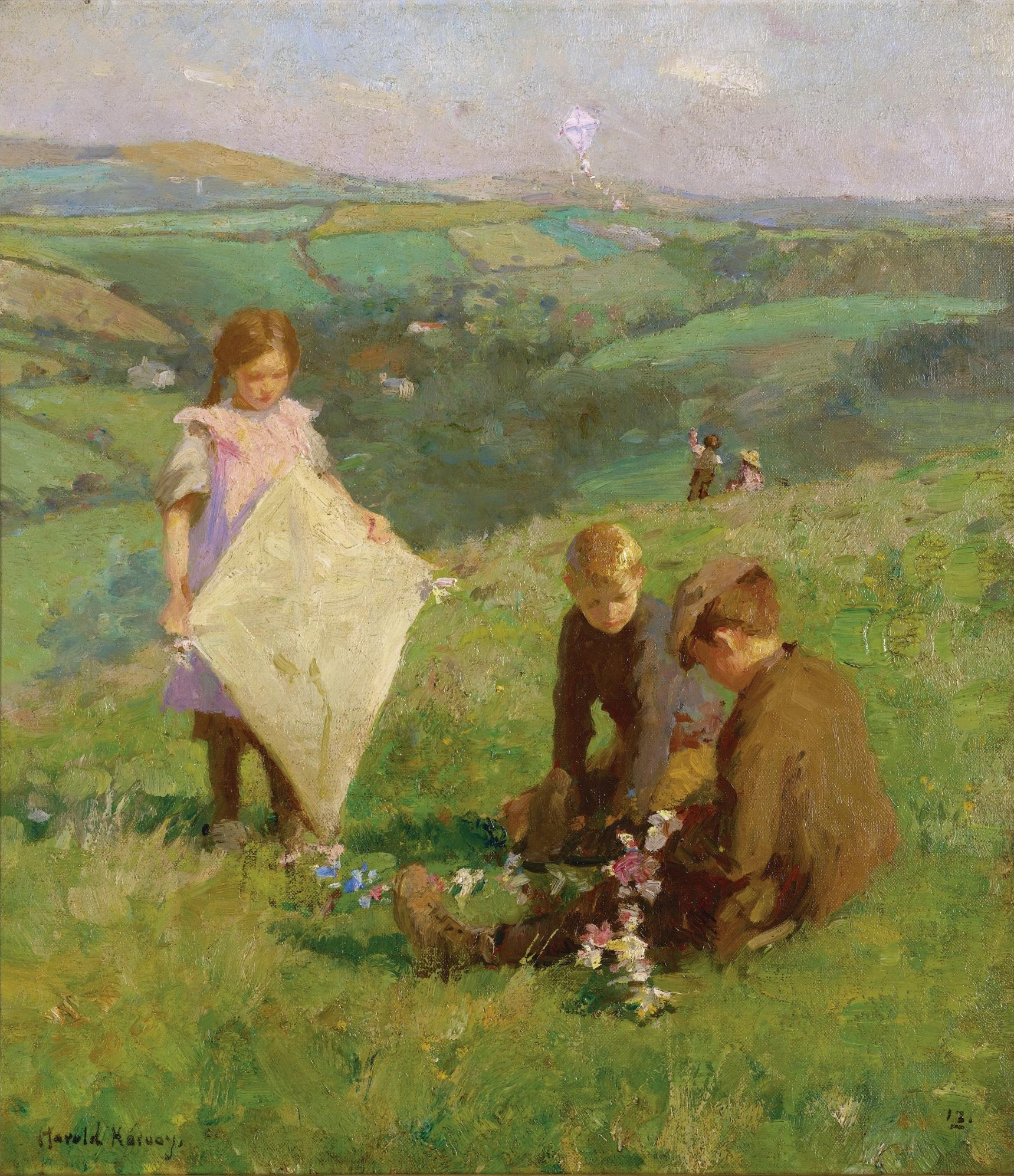
Pioneer of Aerial Navigation, 1913

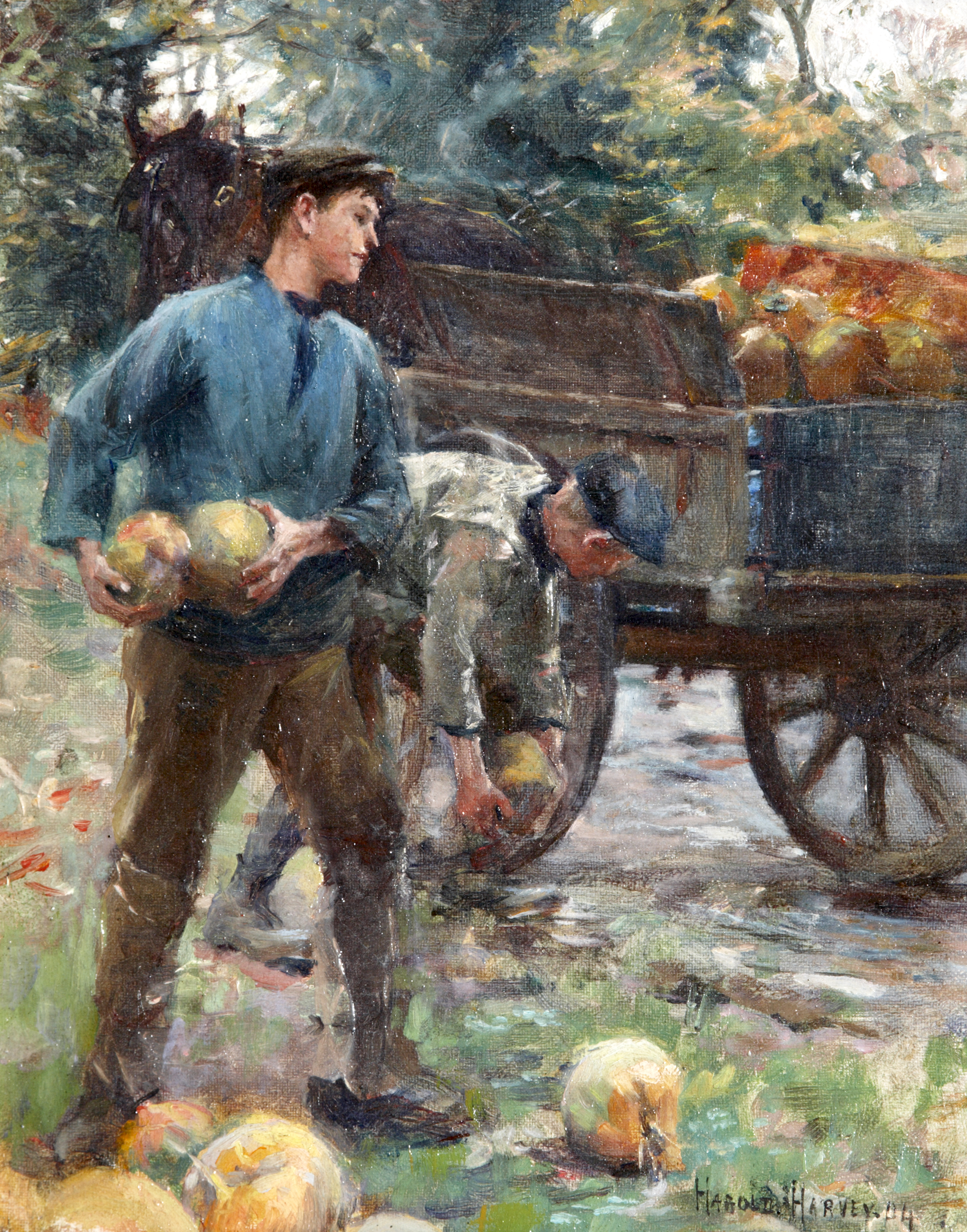
The Mangolds by Harold Harvey, 1904. From the University of Exeter's Fine Art Collection.

== Career ==
After completing his schooling in Paris, Harvey returned to Penzance and began working with Norman Garstin. His works included landscapes and life settings of his native Cornwall, religious themes and interiors. He used oil and watercolour paints.

From 1909 to 1913, he was an Associate of the Royal Cambrian Academy of Art, Conwy and, in 1910, he was a member of the South Wales Art Society. From about 1910 and into the early 1930s, he was a member of the Newlyn Society of Artists, particularly with artists from the Lamorna valley.

In 1920, Harvey and his best friend Ernest Procter established the Harvey-Procter School in Newlyn, Cornwall.

== Selected works ==
Name	Year	Image	Comments
My Kitchen	1923		
A Summer Night	1941 or before		
A view of Paul Newlyn Cornwall	1941 or before		
Three Boys	1904		From the University of Exeter's Fine Art Collection
Gertrude in an Interior	1929		
St Just Tin Miners			The work is in the permanent collection of the Royal Cornwall Museum.
Study for The Top of the Bus	1941 or before		
Supper Time	1909		
The Blackberry Harvest	1941 or before		
The Lady Wheal Reeth Tin Mine	1934		
The Letter	1937		
The Red Silk Shawl	1932		
The Stream in Winter	1933		
Two Young Girls with a Butterfly	1929		
Unloading the Boats, Newlyn Harbour	1906		
The Mangolds	1904		From the University of Exeter's Fine Art Collection

== Exhibitions ==
His work was exhibited starting in 1895 as follows:

- In Whitechapel, other locations in Britain, Pittsburgh and Venice
- 1895 - Newlyn Art Gallery
- 1899 - Newlyn Art Gallery
- 1909 - Newlyn Art Gallery - he had his first gallery sale
- 1913 - Mendoza Gallery, London
- 1914 - Newlyn Art Gallery
- 1918 - Leicester Galleries, London - with Gertrude
- 1920 - Leicester Galleries, London - with Gertrude
- 1921 - Newlyn Art Gallery
- 1921-1941 - Royal Academy
- 1924-1928 - Newlyn Art Gallery
- 1924 - Oldham Municipal Gallery Spring Exhibition
- 1927 - Leicester Galleries, London
- 1932 - Barbizon House, London
- 1937 - Bristol
- 1939 - Bristol

Posthumous exhibitions:

- 1979 - Artists of the Newlyn School, Part 1
- 1985 - Artists of the Newlyn School, Part 2
- 1987 - Looking West, Newlyn Art Gallery and Royal Cambrian Academy
- 1989 - A Century of Art in Cornwall 1889–1989, Truro, CCC Centennial
- 1992 - Artists from Cornwall, 1992 Royal West of England Academy, Bristol
