= World War I Memorial (Berwick, Pennsylvania) =

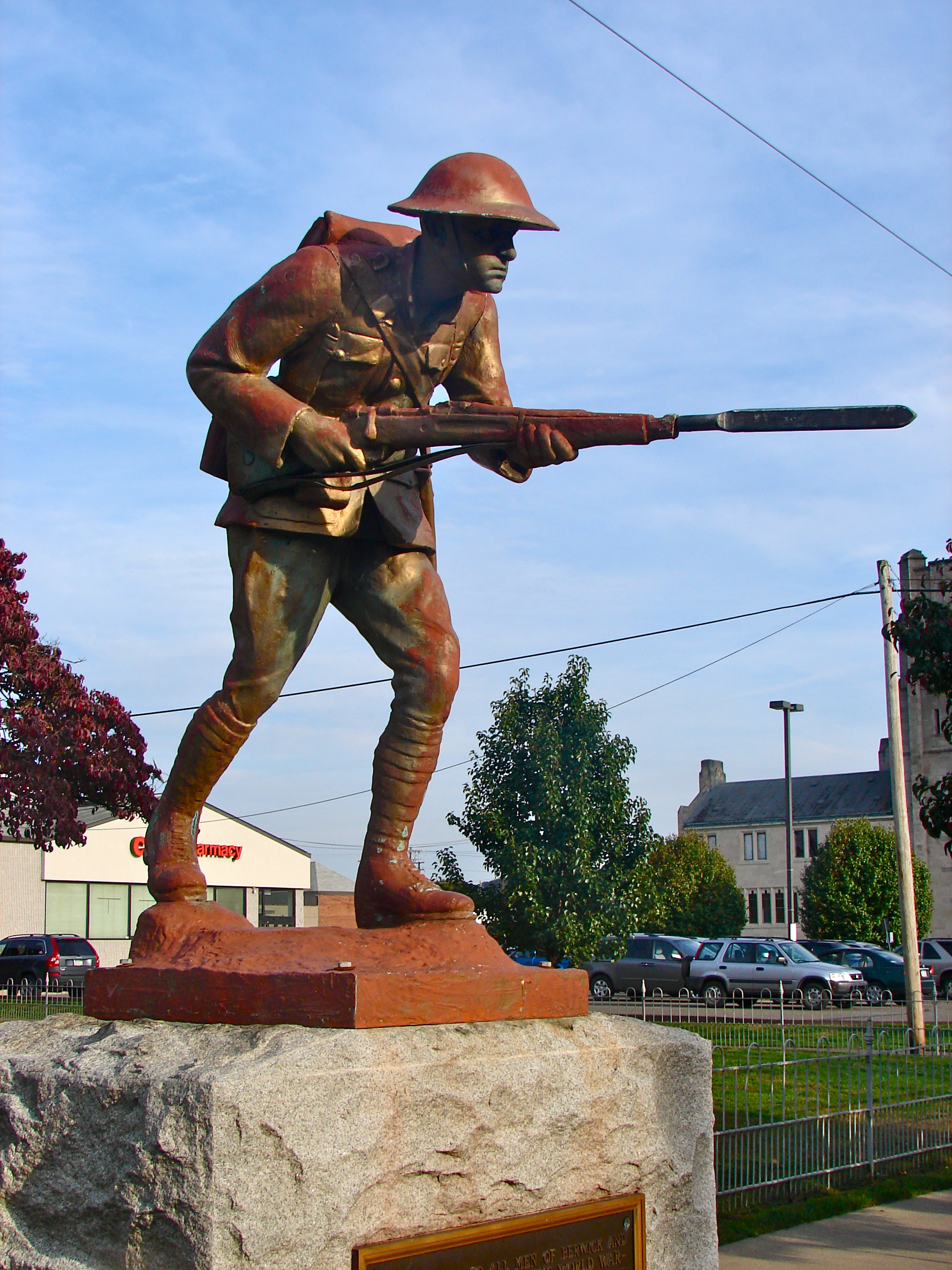

- Year: 1923
- Location: Berwick, Pennsylvania, United States; 41°3′27″N 76°14′7″W

The World War I Memorial is a bronze sculpture, in Berwick, Pennsylvania.

The inscription reads:
(Bronze plaque on front of base:)

DEDICATED TO ALL MEN OF BERWICK AND

VICINITY WHO FOUGHT IN THE WORLD WAR
-TO THOSE WHO FOUGHT AND LIVED, AND THOSE
WHO FOUGHT AND DIED; TO THOSE WHO GAVE
MUCH, AND THOSE WHO GAVE ALL.

1914 IN MEMORIUM(sic) 1918

(list of names)
ERECTED BY THE MOSES VAN CAMPEN CHAPTER DAR 1923.
