= Roses in a Glass Vase =

Painting by Henri Fantin-Latour

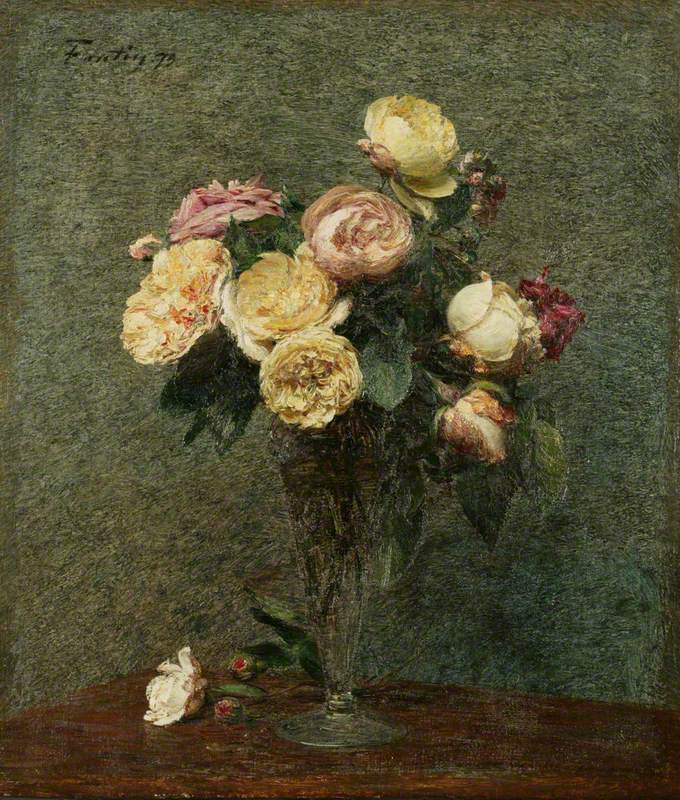
- Artist: Henri Fantin-Latour
- Year: 1879
- Type: oil painting
- Dimensions: 68 cm × 53 cm (27 in × 21 in)
- Location: Manchester Art Gallery; Manchester

Roses in a Glass Vase is an oil-on-canvas painting by French artist Henri Fantin-Latour, executed in 1879. The painting has the dimensions of 68 by 53 cm, and is signed and dated at the top left. It is held at the Manchester Art Gallery.

== Description and analysis ==
The canvas depicts yellow, white, pink and red roses in a narrow glass vase on a wooden table. A small stem with a white rose and two pink buds are extended on the left. The background is dark green and textured. Some flowers seem to have been cut prematurely, while others are collapsing.

Fantin-Latour painted many still lifes of roses, which can now be seen in several museums around the world. He was inspired by the Flemish masters of the 17th century and the silent atmosphere of the still lives of fellow French painter Jean-Baptiste-Siméon Chardin.

== Provenance ==
This painting was bequeathed to the Manchester Art Gallery by Mr and Mrs Assheton-Bennett in 1979.
