= The Corner of the Table =

Painting by Henri Fantin-Latour

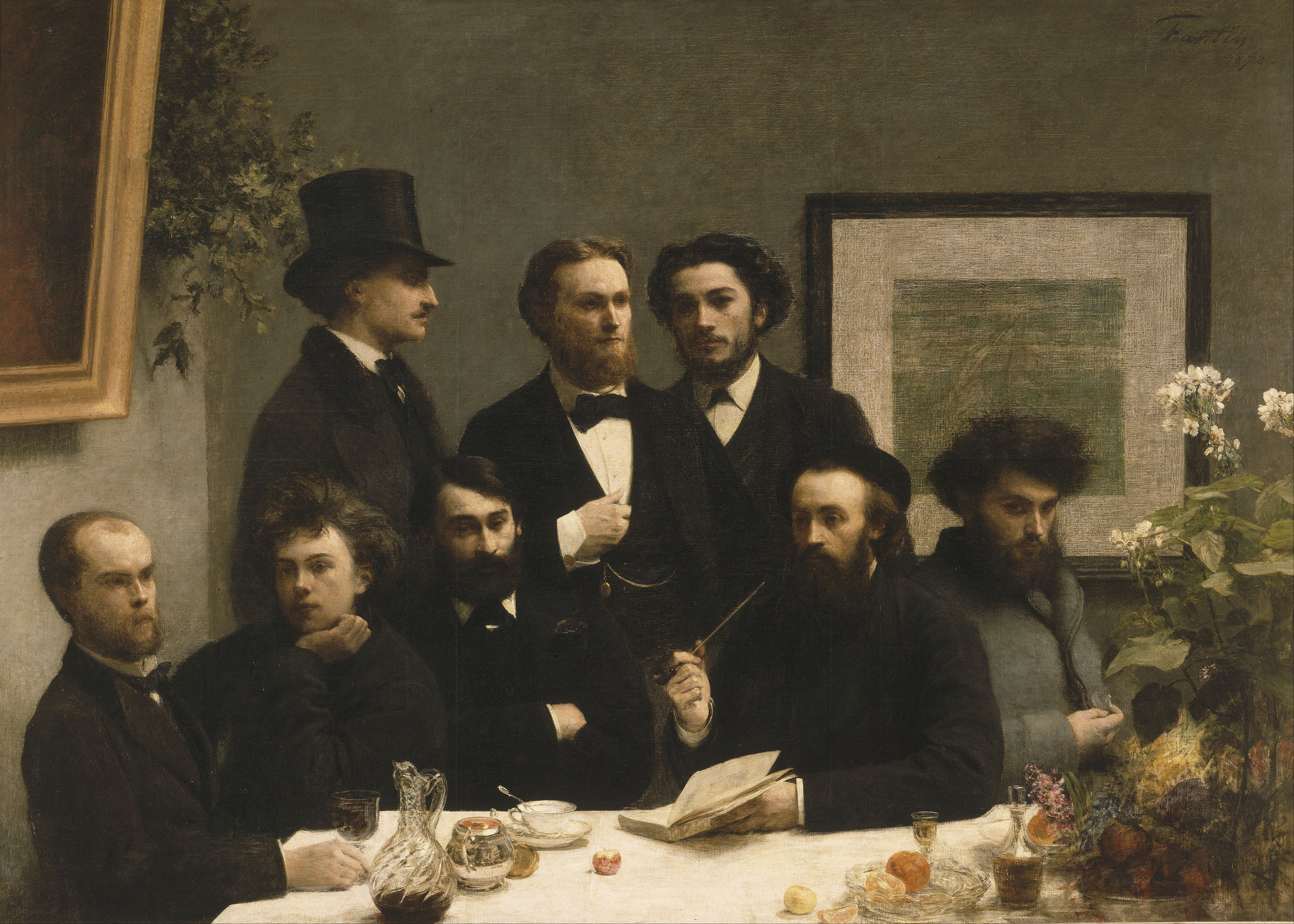
- Artist: Henri Fantin-Latour
- Year: 1872
- Medium: oil on canvas
- Dimensions: 160 cm × 225 cm (63 in × 89 in)
- Location: Musée d'Orsay, Paris

The Corner of the Table is an oil-on-canvas painting by French artist Henri Fantin-Latour, created in 1872. It was exhibited at the 1872 Salon. It is held at the Musée d'Orsay, in Paris.

== History ==
This painting was the third in a series of four "group portraits" created by the artist. The first two, Homage to Delacroix (1864) and A Studio at Les Batignolles (1870), reunited the painters that he admired; the fourth, Autour du Piano (1885), brought together the musicians.

Fantin-Latour's initial project was to create a painting where he would pay tribute to the poet Charles Baudelaire, in a similar way to what he had done to the painter Eugène Delacroix in a previous painting in 1864. He planned to bring together several personalities from the literary world around a portrait of the poet of Les Fleurs du Mal, at the occasion of his 50th birthday. It was his friend Edmond Maître who helped Fantin-Latour to contact several renowned poets, among them Albert Mérat, Paul Verlaine, and Arthur Rimbaud. Baudelaire's editor, Poulet-Malassis even had the idea to invite Leconte de Lisle, Théodore de Banville, and even Victor Hugo, but these personalities refused to pose. There are two sketches of this painting that Fantin-Latour had titled Le Repas.

== Characters ==
This group portrait therefore presents the poets that attended the dinners held at the Vilains Bonshommes, which Edmond Maître had presented to Fantin-Latour. Absent is Albert Mérat, who refused to pose with Rimbaud after an incident that occurred during the dinner of March 2, 1872, when the young poet allegedely interrupted a reading of Jean Aicard and forced the poets to take him out by force.

The group is depicted at the end of a meal, around a table. The painting shows, seated, from left to right, Paul Verlaine, Arthur Rimbaud, Léon Valade, Ernest d'Hervilly, and Camille Pelletan. Standing, from left to right, there are Pierre Elzéar, Émile Blémont, and Jean Aicard. A vase with flowers, in the foreground, at the right, stands for the absent poet, Albert Mérat.

== Description ==
In the foreground, on a white tablecloth at the edge of a table, are a fruit bowl, a carafe filled with wine and a bouquet of flowers on the right, another almost empty carafe on the left, scattered small colored fruits, a coffee cup, its saucer and its spoon. In the background, the group of characters, five of whom are seated and three standing, stand out with their black clothes, except for the one on the right in gray, and their detailed faces. They are placed against the gray background of the decor, occupied by a corner with two walls where two framed paintings are hung; the one on the right is seen from the front, and the one on the left is seen incompletely and from the side; the flowering branches of a plant occupy the top of the corner of the walls and hide the edge.

The characters adopt various poses: a long pipe in one hand; holding an open book; the hand in the waistcoat, above a pocket watch; in profile, wearing a top hat; the chin resting in one hand at the end of a leaning arm; disheveled hair, the right hand holding an empty glass; arms crossed... All the people depicted in the painting are dressed in black except for Camille Pelletan who is in grey.

Fantin-Latour's portrait of Rimbaud is, along with the photo taken by Étienne Carjat, the most famous and reproduced representation of the poet.

== Provenance ==
The painting was sold to the English market, and then bought back by Émile Blémont, who donated it to the Louvre in 1910. Since 1986, it is held at the Musée d'Orsay, in Paris.

== Cultural references ==
The painting was the subject of a fictionalized story by Claude Chevreuil, Un Coin de Table (2010).

It was chosen by Michel Butor for his book Le Musée imaginaire de Michel Butor: 105 œuvres décisives de la peinture occidentale (2019), a selection of a group of 105 "decisive works" of the western painting.
