= Victoria Dubourg =

French painter

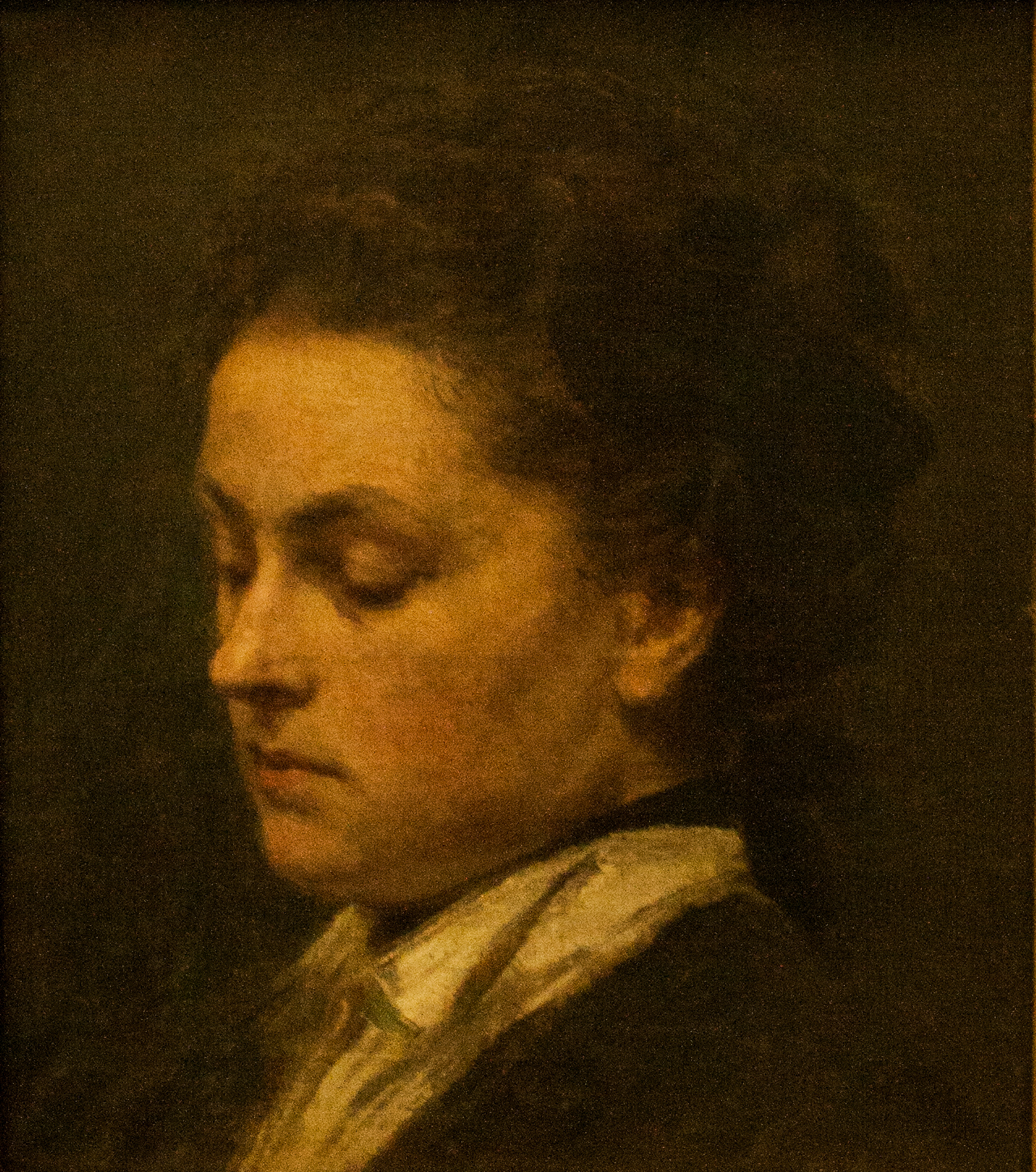
- Portrait of Victoria by her husband
- Born: 1 December 1840; Paris, France
- Died: 30 September 1926 (aged 85); Buré, Orne, France

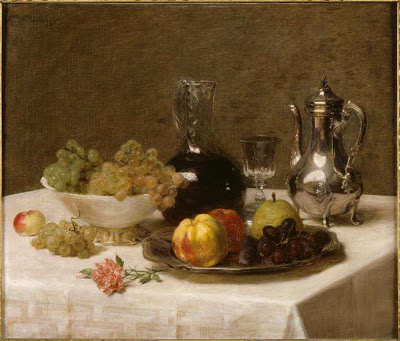
Victoria Dubourg Fantin-Latour, Still-Life, 1884. Oil on canvas, 20 1/4 x 24 1/4 in. Musée de Grenoble

Victoria Dubourg, V Dubourg, or Victoria Fantin-Latour (1 December 1840 – 30 September 1926) was a French portrait and still life painter in France during the Impressionist period and the cultural flowering of the Belle Époque period that was a reaction to the former.

Dubourg was born in Paris and trained with artist Fanny Chéron While there, she met the painter Henri Fantin-Latour, whom she married in 1876 and after which she collaborated with, on his floral paintings. Dubourg has been critiqued incorrectly by some as an artist whose work lacks originality, alleged to simply have reproduced the styles of her husband, however, a careful review of her early work shows that Dubourg began producing still life paintings two years prior to meeting Fantin-Latour and that her paintings had been admitted for exhibition at eight salons prior to her marriage, signifiying her acceptance as an established painter in a very competitive art milieu. Her painting A Basket of Flowers was included in the 1905 book Women Painters of the World.

== Biography ==
Dubourg was born in 1840 and her parents recognized their relationship to her when they married in 1843. She had one sister, Charlotte Dubourg (1850–1921). Dubourg's maternal family was originally from Orne. Her mother Françoise was born in Sées, where her parents lived. Her father Philippe Bienvenu had lived in Buré and bequeathed Dubourg the house located at a place called "La Croix" upon his death on March 28, 1878. Henri Fantin-Latour represents the Dubourg family as very bereaved after the loss of the old man. The Dubourg family had lived for a few years in Frankfurt where Victor Dubourg trained in medicine after teaching Letters.

Born and educated in Paris, Dubourg was trained by painter Fanny Chéron (born 1830), a woman originally from Mortagne who opened a workshop for young girls. A music lover and pianist, Dubourg also studied painting and copied the major works of artists such as Willem Kalf at the Louvre. There, she met Henri Fantin-Latour, who also was painting copies of works in the collection. He painted his first portrait of Dubourg in 1873. They married in 1876.

Victoria Dubourg's early works displayed popular styles of that time, including a 1870 portrait of her sister, Charlotte. However, after exhibiting portraits in the late 1860s, she began to diverge from these styles, beginning to create still-lives of fruit and flowers at a time when the styles of the Belle Époque period became fashionable. Her husband died in 1904. After that time, a description of Victoria's paintings notes a supple, freer brushstroke and that her colors became more vibrant, as seen in her 1908 painting, Chrysanthemums.

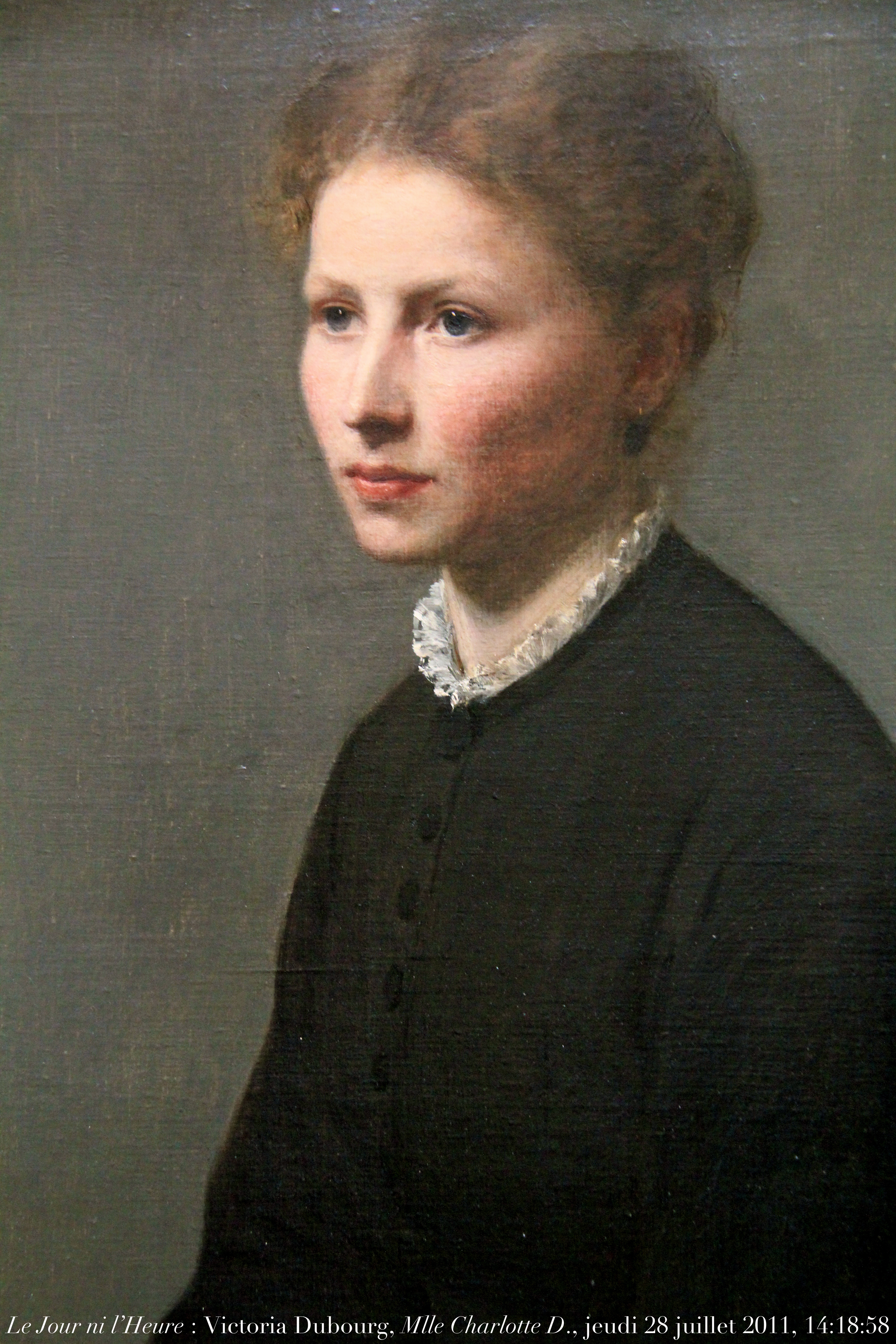
Portrait of Charlotte Dubourg (1870) by her sister Victoria Dubourg - musée de Grenoble

She is part of the circle of painters that included Édouard Manet, Berthe Morisot, and Edgar Degas and signed her early work simply as "V Dubourg". During her marriage, Dubourg and Fantin-Latour lived at rue de l'Université n°19 in Paris, in the building where Marie and Félix Bracquemond had lived. Dubourg and her husband exhibited in the competitive and invitational Paris salons as well as both being invited to become members of the Royal Academy in London, exhibiting at the academy shows.

Beginning in 1869, Victoria Dubourg exhibited by invitation at the Salon in Paris, at the Salon of French artists, and at the Royal Academy in London. In Paris, she was awarded an honorable mention in 1894 and a medal in 1895. She was named Chevalier of the Legion of Honor in 1920.

She also collaborated on her husband's floral paintings and following his death in 1904, she organized a major retrospective of his work. She devoted several years to the development of a catalogue raisonné for his work, to the detriment of her own work.

In 1921, she bequeathed a photographic body of her husband's work to the Museum of Grenoble, given that he was a native of the city.

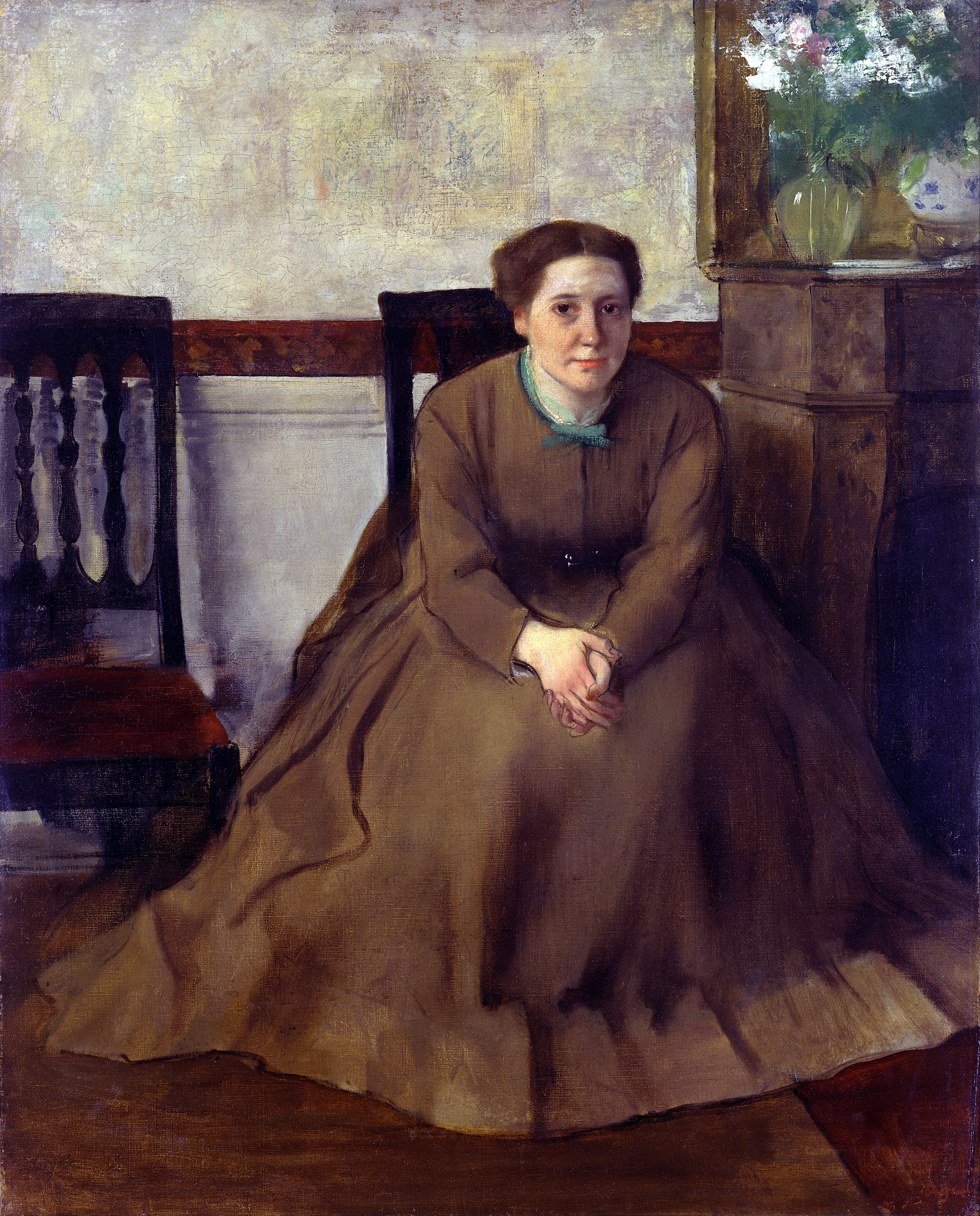
Portrait of Victoria by Edgar Degas

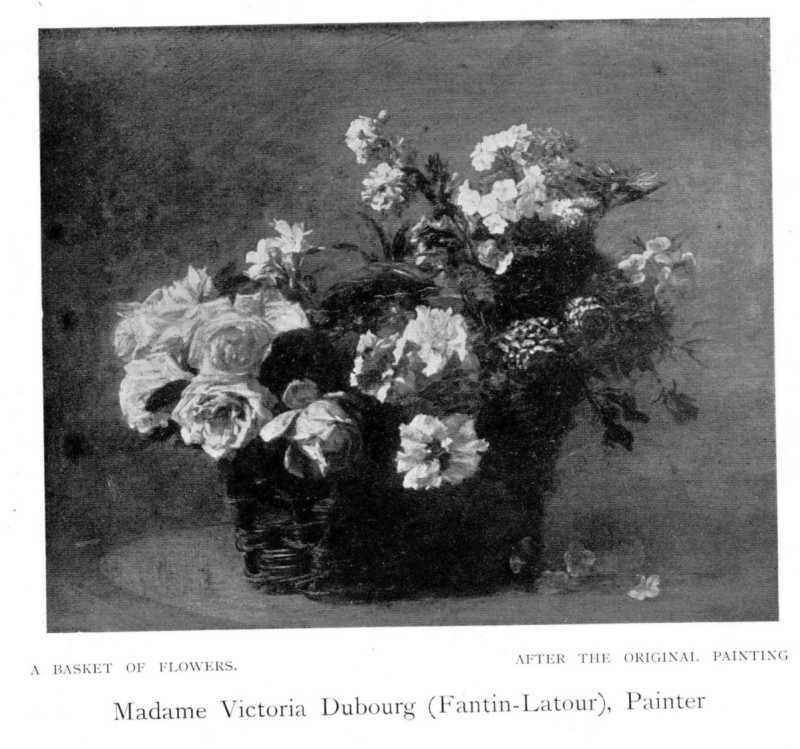
A Basket of Flowers by Victoria Dubourg

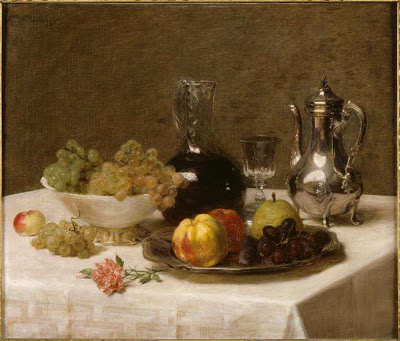
Still-life by Victoria Dubourg

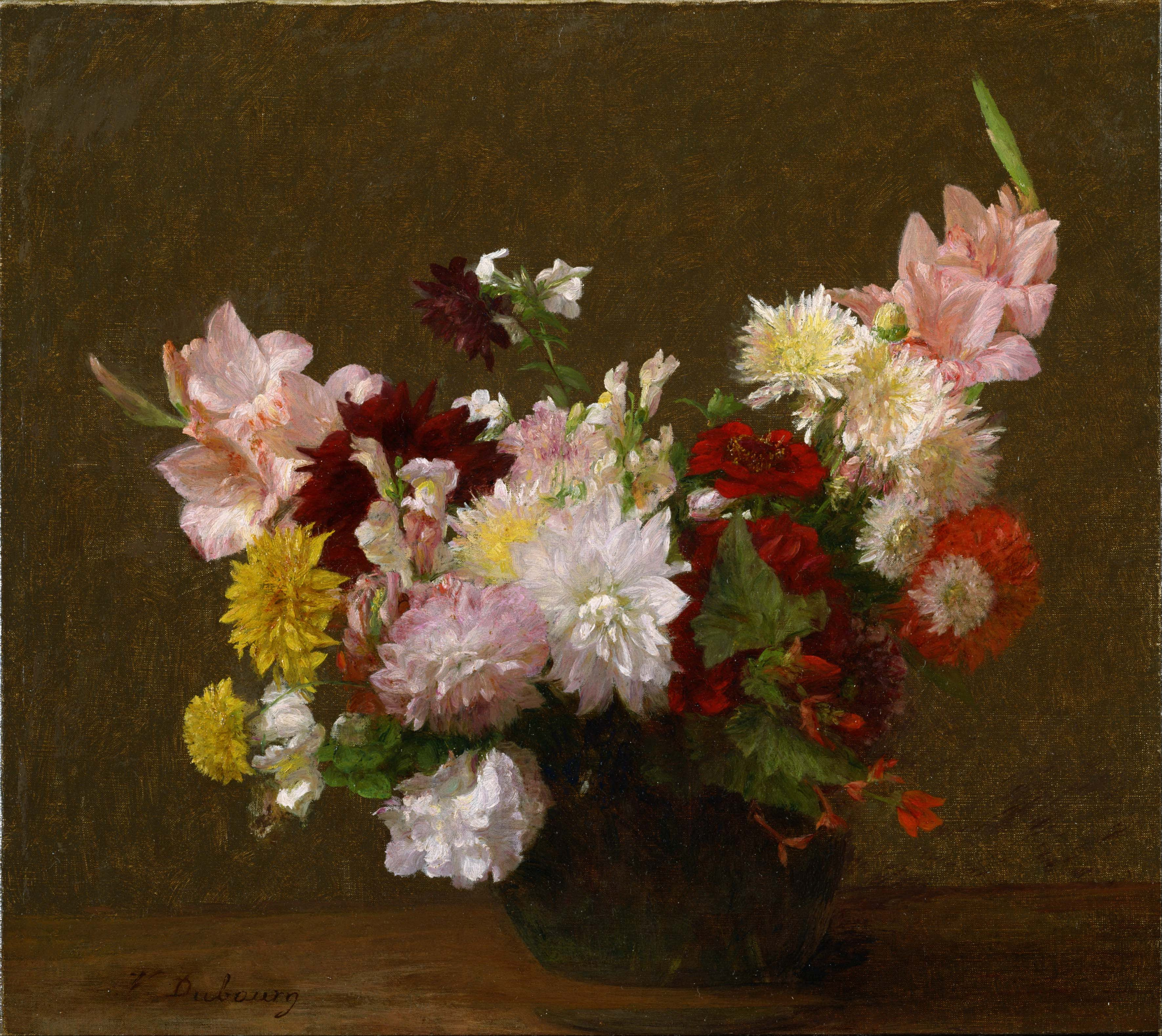
Flowers by Victoria Dubourg Fantin-Latour

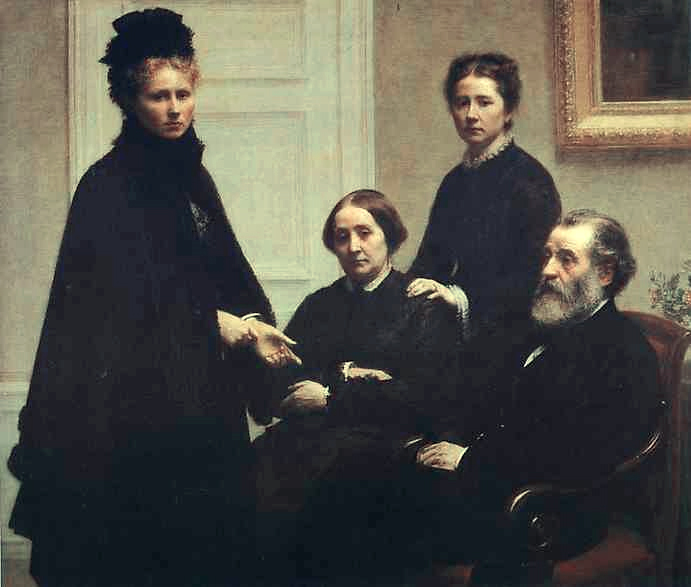
The Dubourg Family (1878) by Henri Fantin-Latour, Musée d'Orsay, Paris
