= Self-Portrait (Fantin-Latour) =

Painting by Henri Fantin-Latour

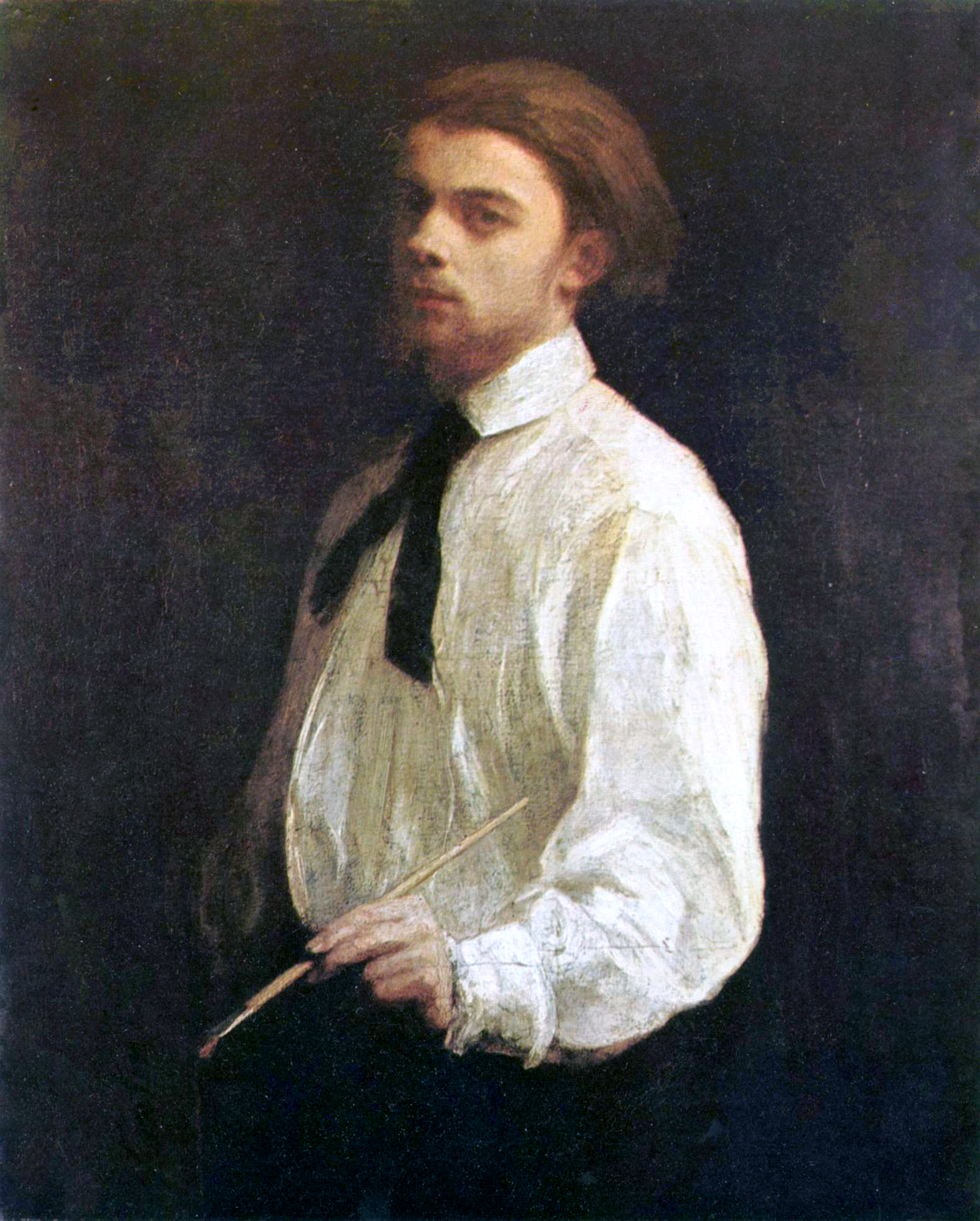
- Artist: Henri Fantin-Latour
- Year: 1859
- Medium: Oil on canvas
- Dimensions: 101 cm × 83.5 cm (40 in × 32.9 in)
- Location: Museum of Grenoble; Grenoble

Self-Portrait or Portrait of the Artist Aged 23 is an oil on canvas self portrait by the French painter Henri Fantin-Latour, from 1859. It is held at the Museum of Grenoble.

It shows the artist in a white shirt against a black background, with a paintbrush in his left hand, looking directly at the viewer. It was his first submission to the Paris Salon but was not accepted. In 1901, the painter offered it to the Museum of Grenoble, where it still hangs.
