= Henri Fantin-Latour =

French painter (1836–1904)

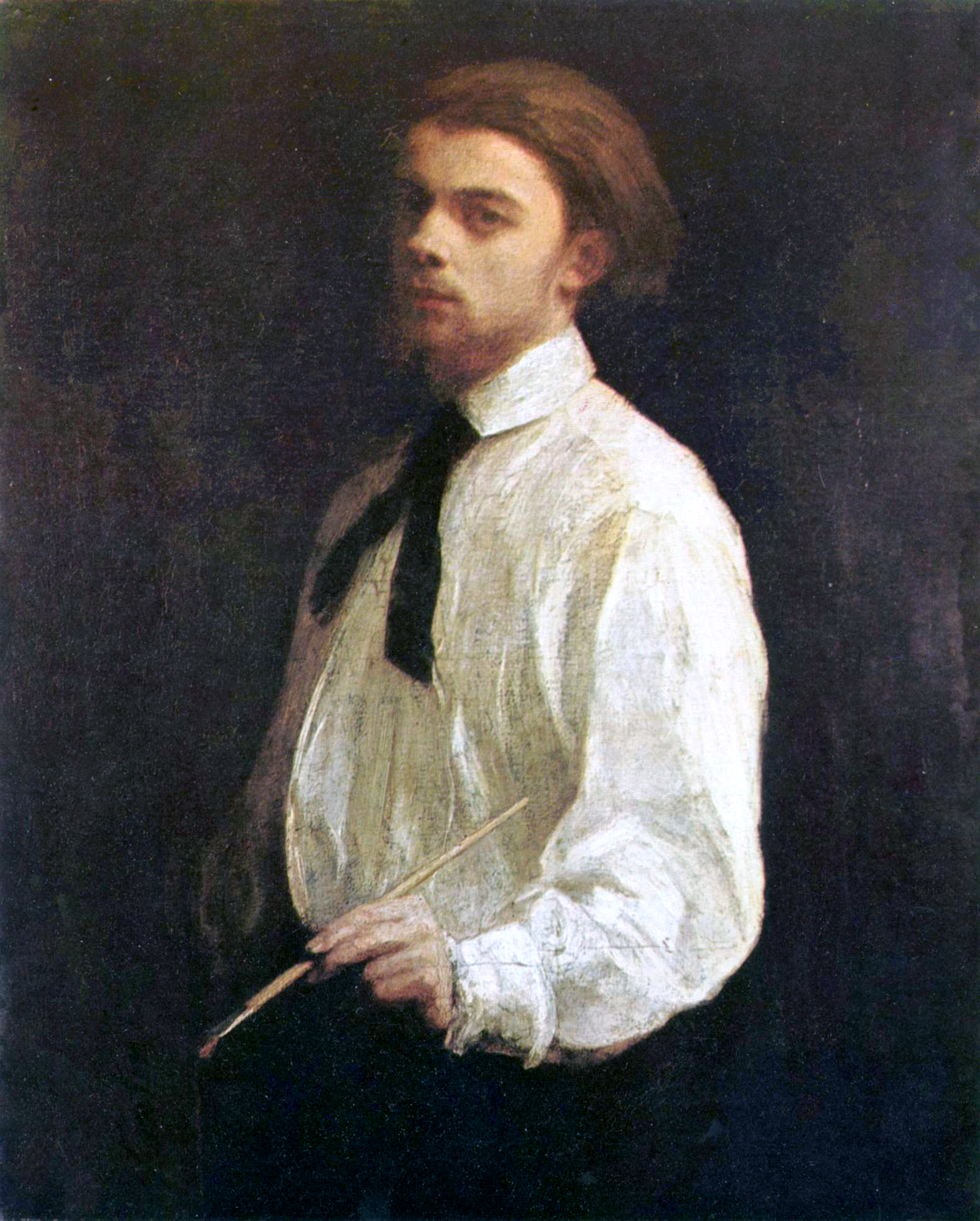
- Self-portrait (1859), Museum of Grenoble
- Born: 14 January 1836; Grenoble, France
- Died: 25 August 1904 (aged 68); Buré, France
- Resting place: Cimetière du Montparnasse
- Education: École des Beaux-Arts
- Movement: Realism, symbolism
- Spouse: Victoria Dubourg

Ignace Henri Jean Theodore Fantin-Latour (French pronunciation: [ɑ̃ʁi fɑ̃tɛ̃ latuʁ]; 14 January 1836 – 25 August 1904) was a French painter and lithographer best known for his flower paintings and group portraits of Parisian artists and writers.

== Early life ==
Born in Grenoble, Isère, Ignace Henri Jean Théodore Fantin-Latour first had drawing lessons with his father Théodore Fantin-Latour (1805–1875), who was a painter. In 1850 he moved to Paris where he enrolled in the small Paris School of Drawing, where he studied with Louis-Alexandre Péron and Horace Lecoq de Boisbaudran, an innovative and non-traditional instructor who developed his own teaching method based on painting and drawing from memory.

He entered the École des Beaux-Arts of Paris in 1854, with Edgar Degas, Alphonse Legros and Jean-Charles Cazin as classmates. After studying there, he spent long time copying the works of the old masters in the Musée du Louvre. Although Fantin-Latour befriended several of the young artists who would later be associated with Impressionism, including Whistler and Manet, his own work remained conservative in style.

In 1861, he briefly frequented the studio of Gustave Courbet. A painting from this period represents him with the painter and caricaturist Oulevay.

At the start of his career, between 1854 and 1861, he produced a large number of self-portraits in chalk, charcoal and oil. He had one of them refused at the Salon of 1859. He participated again with La Liseuse in 1861.

A member of the so-called Cénacle des Batignolles, or group of 1863, from where Impressionism originated, he was, according to Gustave Kahn, a kind of the link between their painters and romantic painting.

In 1862, one of his still lifes was exhibited at the Royal Academy in London. It was the first of a long series, for thereafter he presented several almost every year and which invariably occupied a prominent place in the exhibition building. During his third trip to England, from July to October 1864, he once again painted still lifes there. He had commercial success.

== The 1860s and his still lifes ==
Encouraged by American painter James McNeill Whistler (1834–1903), whom he met in 1858 at the Louvre, he made several stays in London from 1859 to 1881. In the 1860s, he cultivated the genre of the still life, who would play a capital role in his career. Fantin-Latour would find recognition in England for his compositions of flowers and fruits, at a time when French Impressionist painting was still not very widely there. It was said that his still lifes were "practically unknown in France during his lifetime". Thanks to Whistler he met his brother-in-law Francis Seymour Haden and the engraver Edwin Edwards, and it was in London that he learned engraving.

His decision to make still lifes may seem surprising at the time of Impressionism, however, the choice of such a subject wasn't innocent. In the hierarchy of genres enacted by the Academy of Fine Arts since the 17th century, the still life of fruit or flowers was considered a minor category. By ignoring any literary, religious or historical context, supposed to confer value and nobility on the work, he adopted the opposite stance of academicism. Edwin and Ruth Edwards, his English patrons and merchants, recommended that he always used simple vases and table tops in order to exhibit his great talent in rendering texture and color.

Fantin-Latour still lifes were also very appreciated in the Netherlands at his time. At the Living Masters Exhibition in Amsterdam, in 1889, one of his still lifes with roses sold by 2,000 guilders, a considerable sum back then. Dutch art dealers from Amsterdam regularly sold works by Fantin-Latour well into the 1930s. Many of these works would end in Dutch museums such as the Rijksmuseum, in Amsterdam, and the Kröller-Müller Museum, in Otterlo.

== Artistic universe ==
After his first Salon submissions were rejected in 1859, Fantin-Latour began exhibiting with his friend Édouard Manet and the future Impressionists Pierre-Auguste Renoir and Claude Monet. In 1865, he wrote to Edwin Edwards : “We form a group and make noise because there are many painters and one is easily forgotten. When we come together... we grow in numbers and become more adventurous. I thought it could last, it was my mistake”.

In 1867, he was also one of the nine members of the Japanese Jinglar Society, along with Carolus-Duran, who painted his portrait twice in 1861, and the ceramists Bracquemond and Solon, who they met at dinner in the Japanese style. “One always felt when approaching him, a small feeling of fear, because of these rough manners which the artists of his generation often affected as inseparable from a noble independence,” said Jacques-Émile Blanche, a painter friend of the following generation.

Fantin-Latour renovated the collective portraiture with paintings that served as large manifestos: Homage to Delacroix (1864); A Studio at Les Batignolles (1870), a tribute to Manet; The Corner of the Table (1872), a homage to the Parnassian poets, including Paul Verlaine and Arthur Rimbaud; and Around the Piano (1885), a tribute to musicians and musicologists of his time.

In A Studio at Les Batignolles, Manet is depicted at the center in the act of painting, surrounded by several important painters and writers, including Pierre-Auguste Renoir, Zacharie Astruc, Emile Zola, Frédéric Bazille and Claude Monet. This canvas testifies to the links he maintained with the artistic and literary avant-garde of the time and to Manet in particular; it also seems to be an echo of Zola's opinion of Manet: "Around the painter reviled by the public, a common front has been created of painters and writers claiming him as a master".

In addition to his realistic paintings, Fantin-Latour created imaginative lithographs inspired by the music of some of the great classical composers. In 1876, Fantin-Latour attended a performance of the Ring cycle at Bayreuth, which he found particularly moving. He later published lithographs inspired by Richard Wagner in La revue wagnérienne, which helped solidify his reputation among Paris' avant-garde as an anti-naturalist painter.

In 1876, Fantin-Latour married a fellow painter, Victoria Dubourg, whom he met when both were copying the same painting at the Louvre. He spent his summers on the country estate of his wife's family at Buré, Orne in Lower Normandy, where he died on 25 August 1904.

Like many painters of his time, he became interested in photography, taking pictures for his work. He was also a big collector of erotic photographs; his estate lists more than 1,400 which are kept in the Museum of Grenoble.

He was interred in the Cimetière du Montparnasse, Paris, France.

== Legacy ==
Marcel Proust mentions Fantin-Latour's work in In Search of Lost Time:

"Many young women's hands would be incapable of doing what I see there," said the Prince, pointing to Mme de Villeparisis's unfinished watercolours. And he asked her whether she had seen the flower painting by Fantin-Latour which had recently been exhibited. (The Guermantes Way)

His first major UK gallery exhibition in 40 years took place at the Bowes Museum in April 2011. Musée du Luxembourg presented a retrospective exhibition of his work in 2016–2017 entitled "À fleur de peau".

A reproduction of the painting A Basket of Roses was used as the cover of New Order's album Power, Corruption & Lies by Peter Saville in 1983.

Nine artworks by Fantin-Latour are listed concerning their Nazi-era provenance on the Lost Art Foundation website.

== Gallery ==
Flower paintings

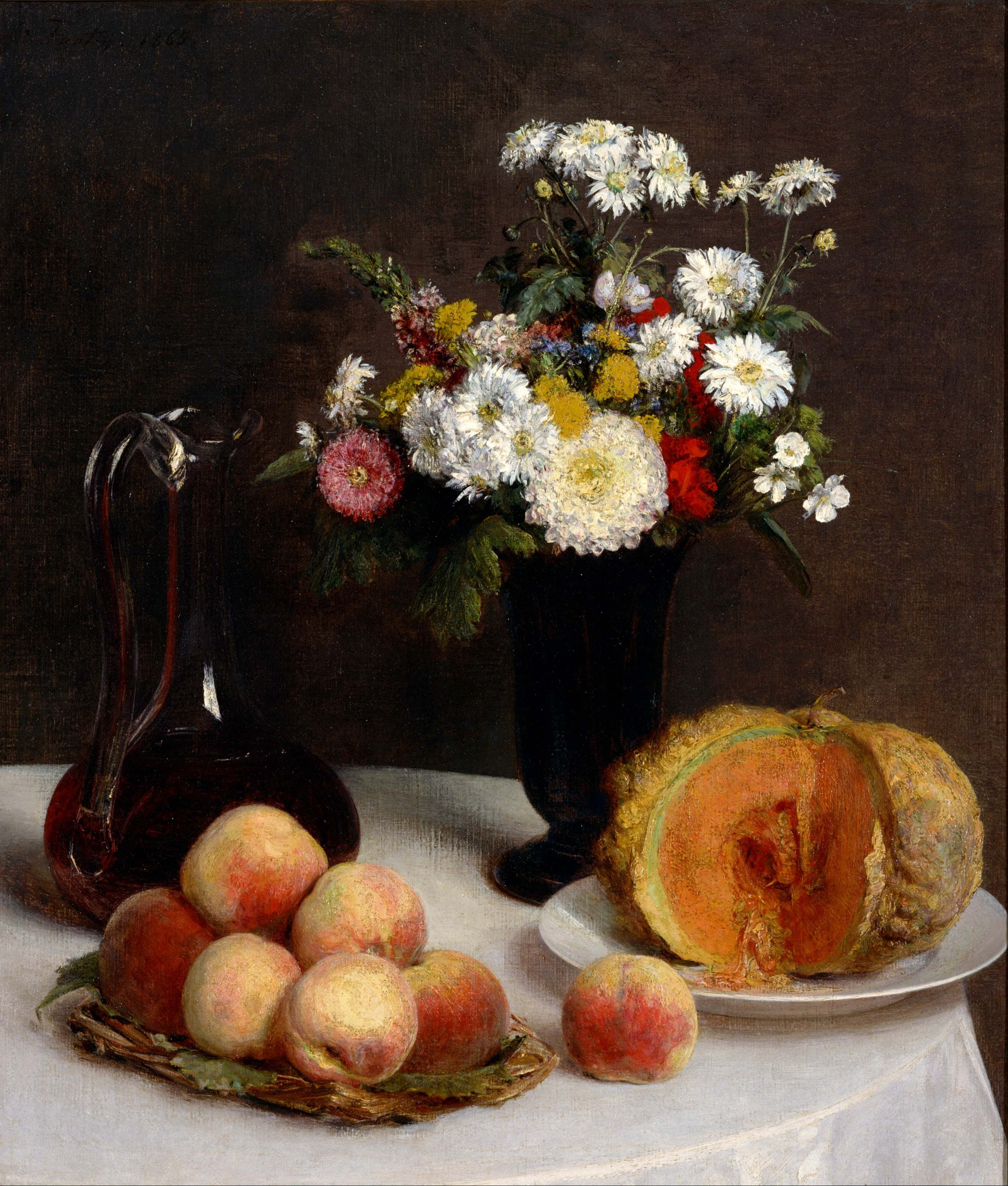
Still Life with a Carafe, Flowers and Fruit (1865)

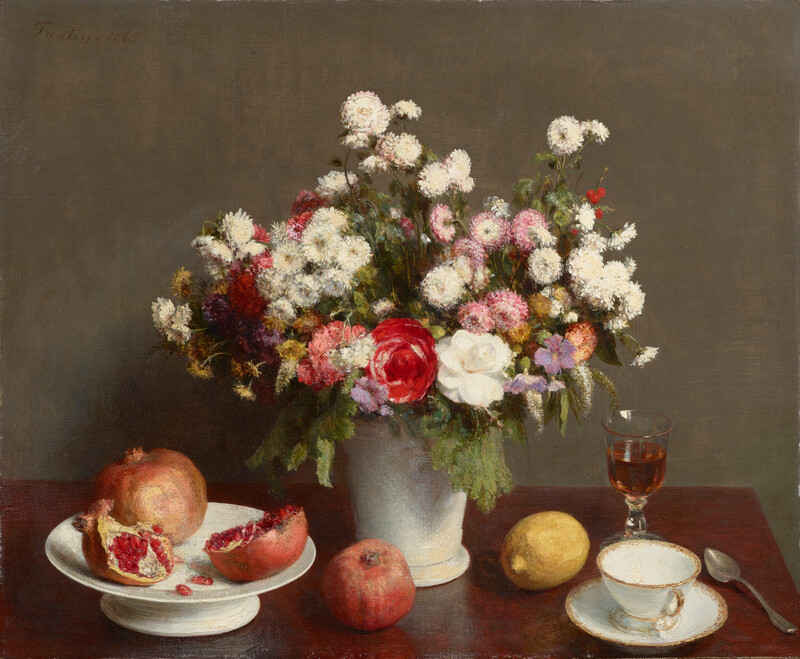
Still Life with Flowers, Fruits, Wineglass and a Tea Cup (1865)

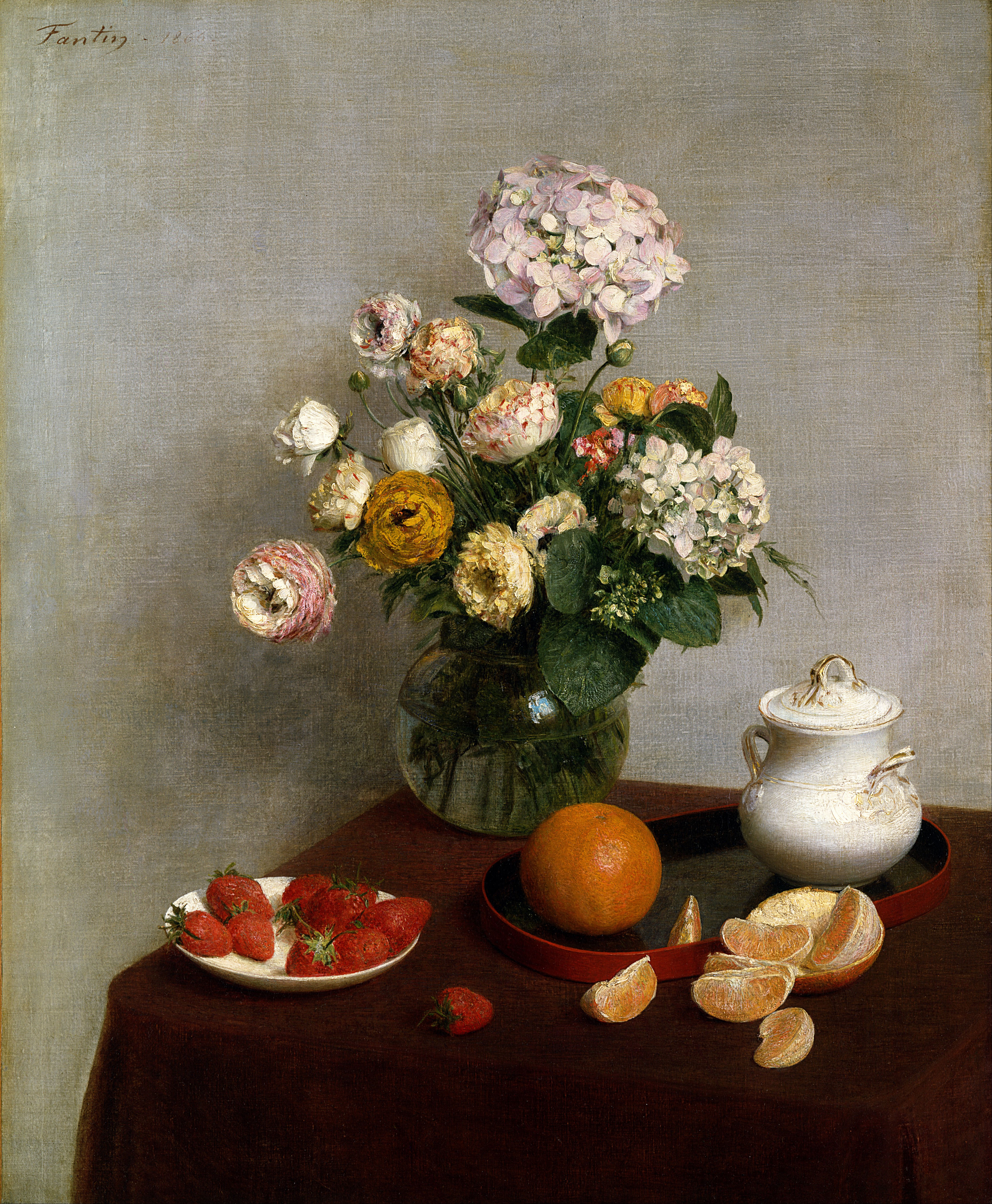
Flowers and Fruit (1866)

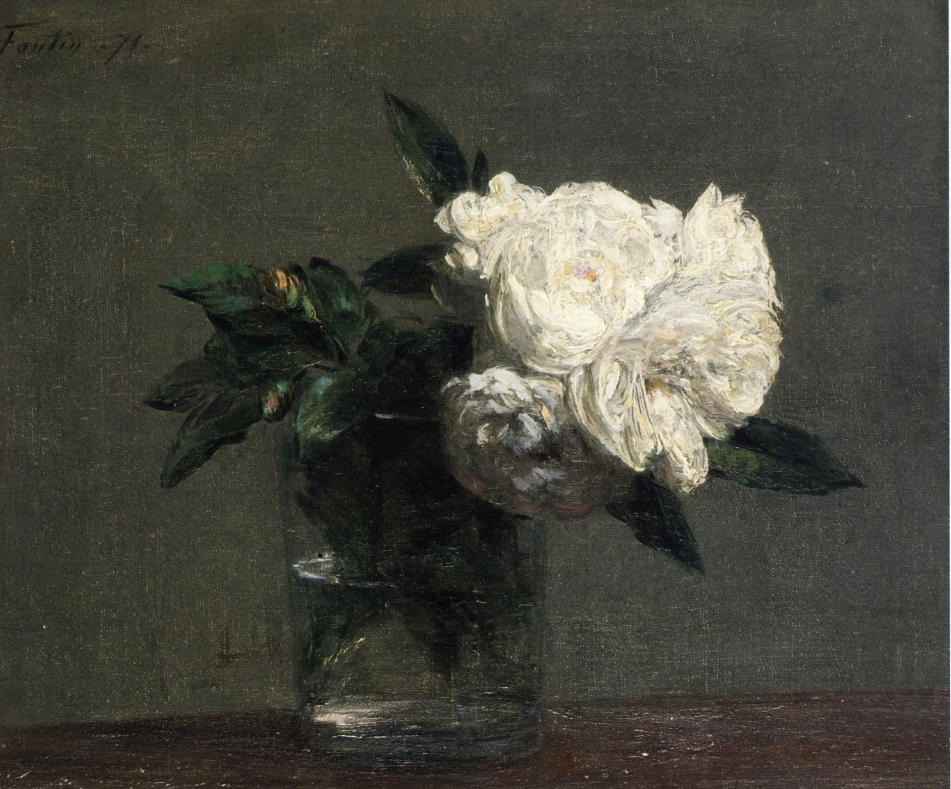
White Roses (1871)

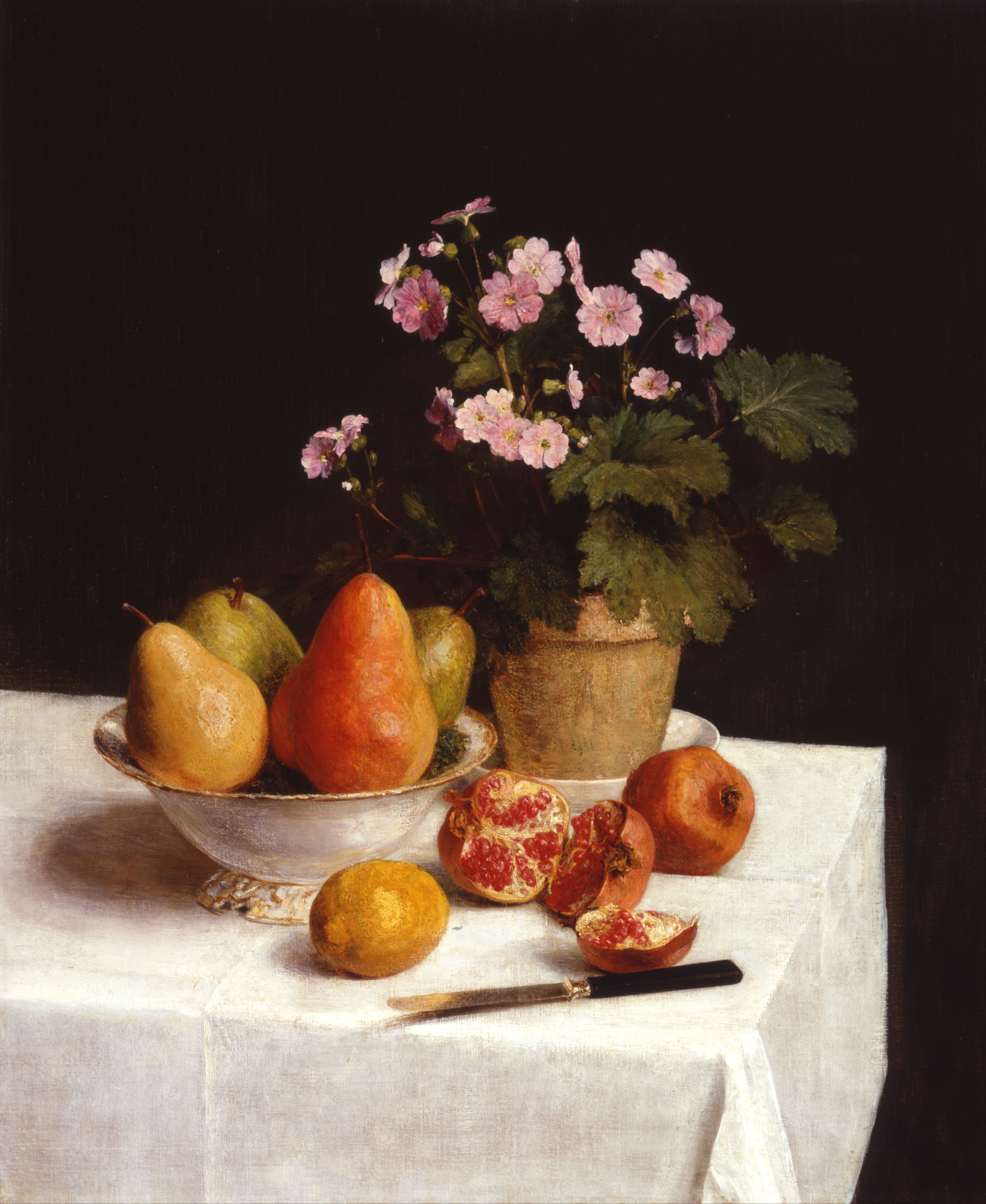
Still Life, primroses, pears and promenates (1873)

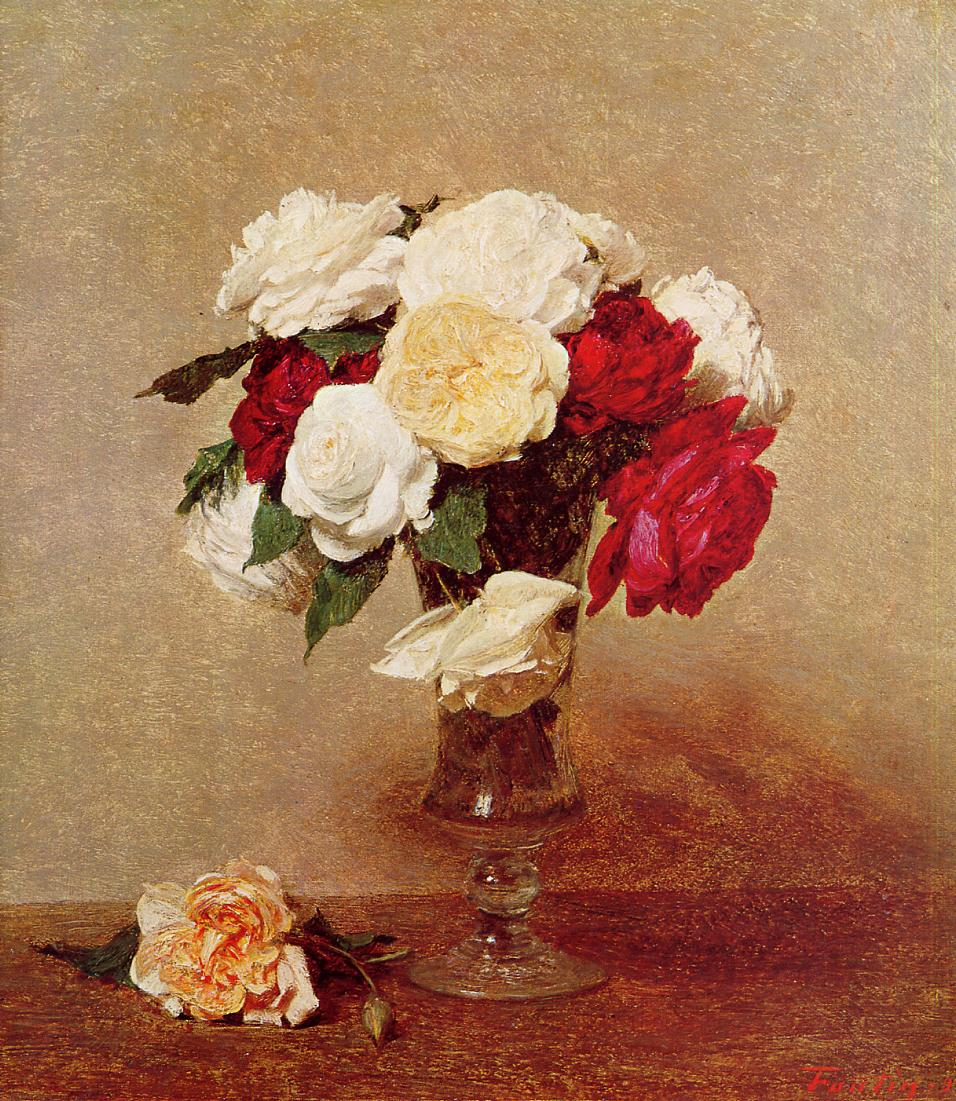
Vase of Roses (1875)

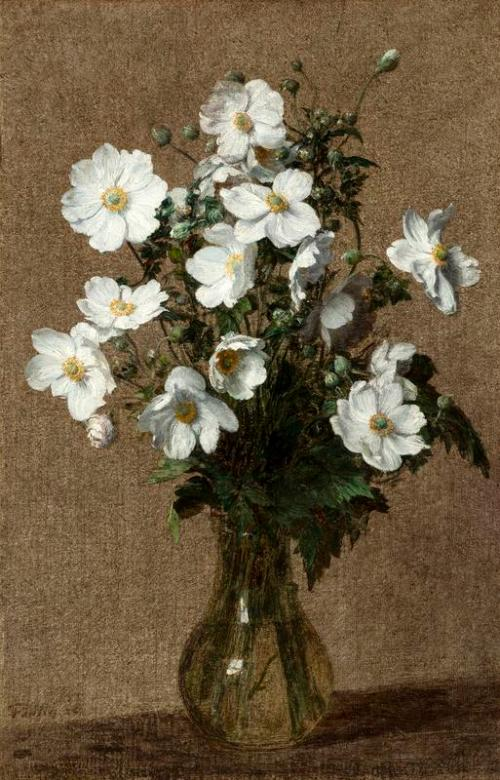
Japanese Anemones (1884)

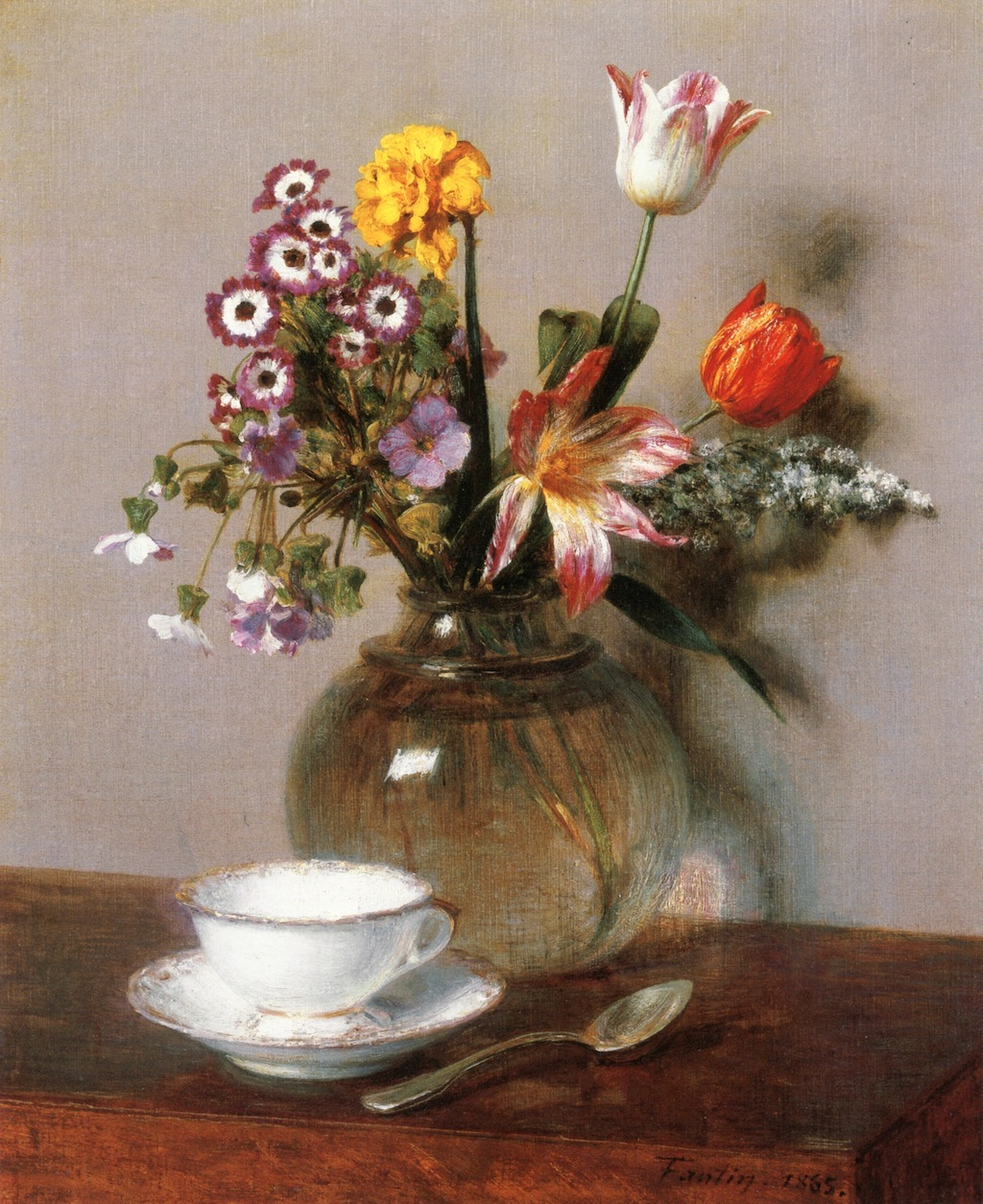
Vase of Flowers with a Coffee Cup (1885)

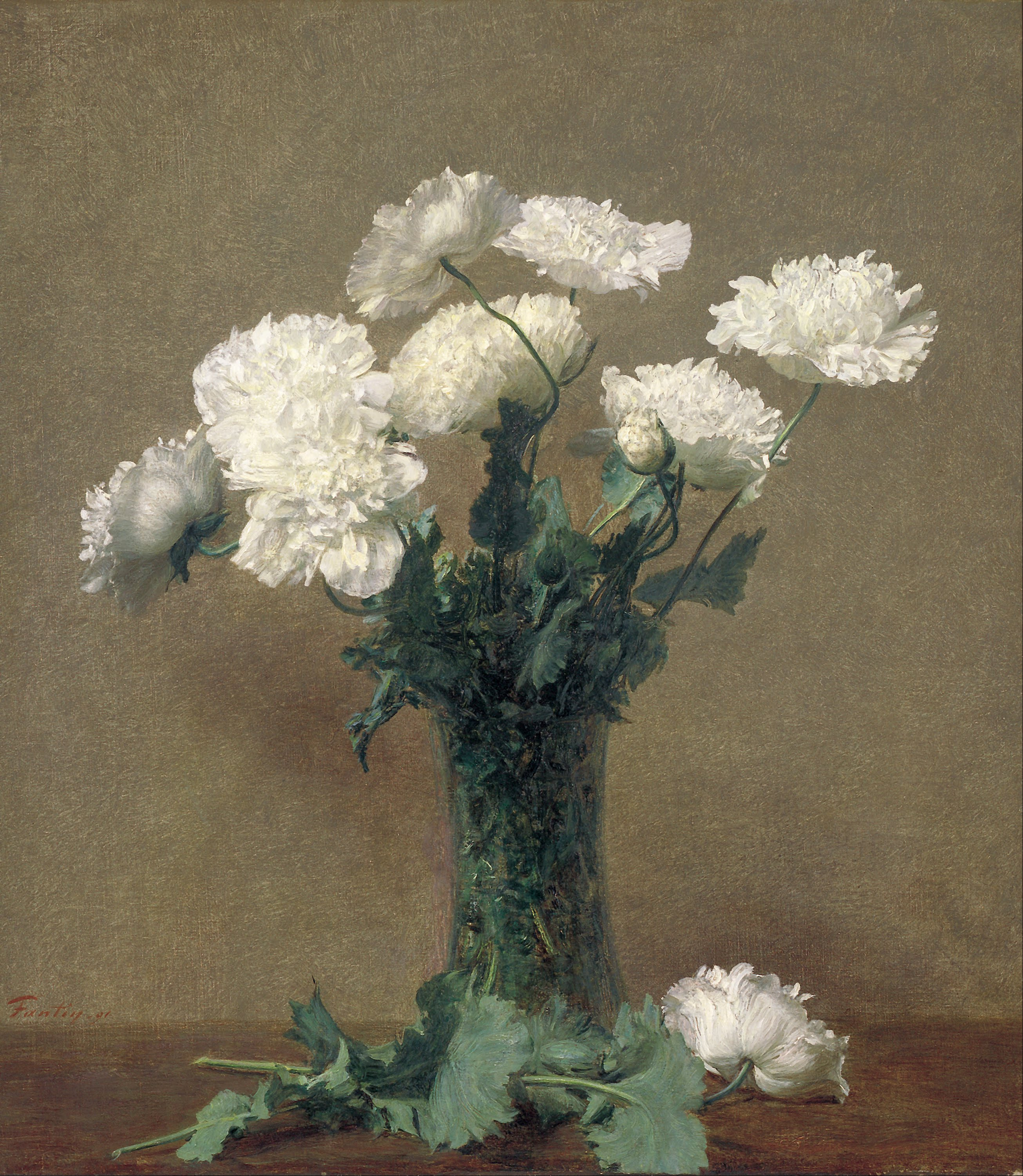
Peonies (1891)

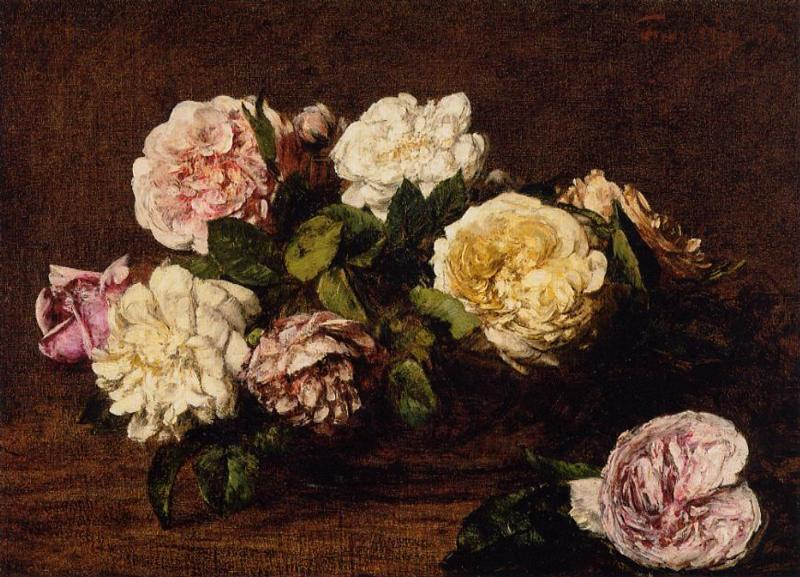
Roses

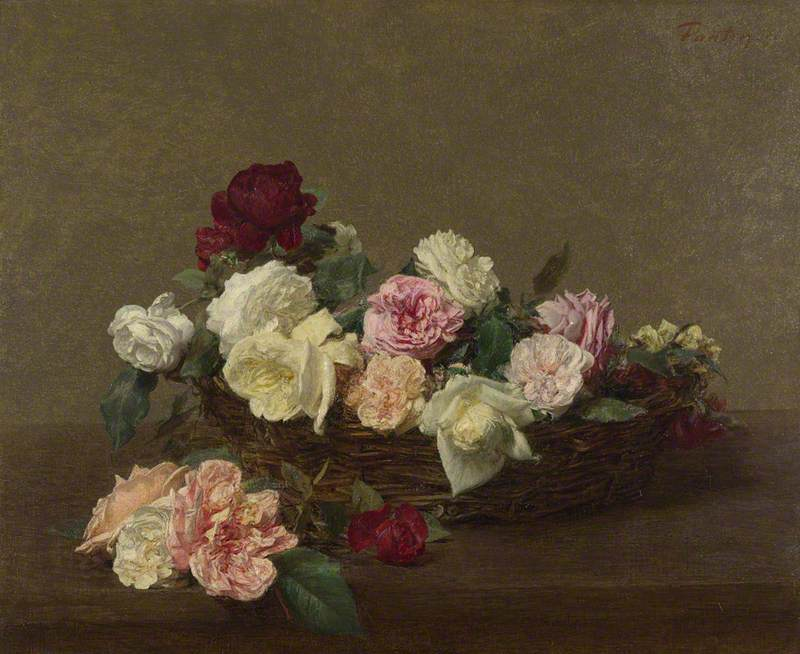
A Basket of Roses (1890)

Other still lifes

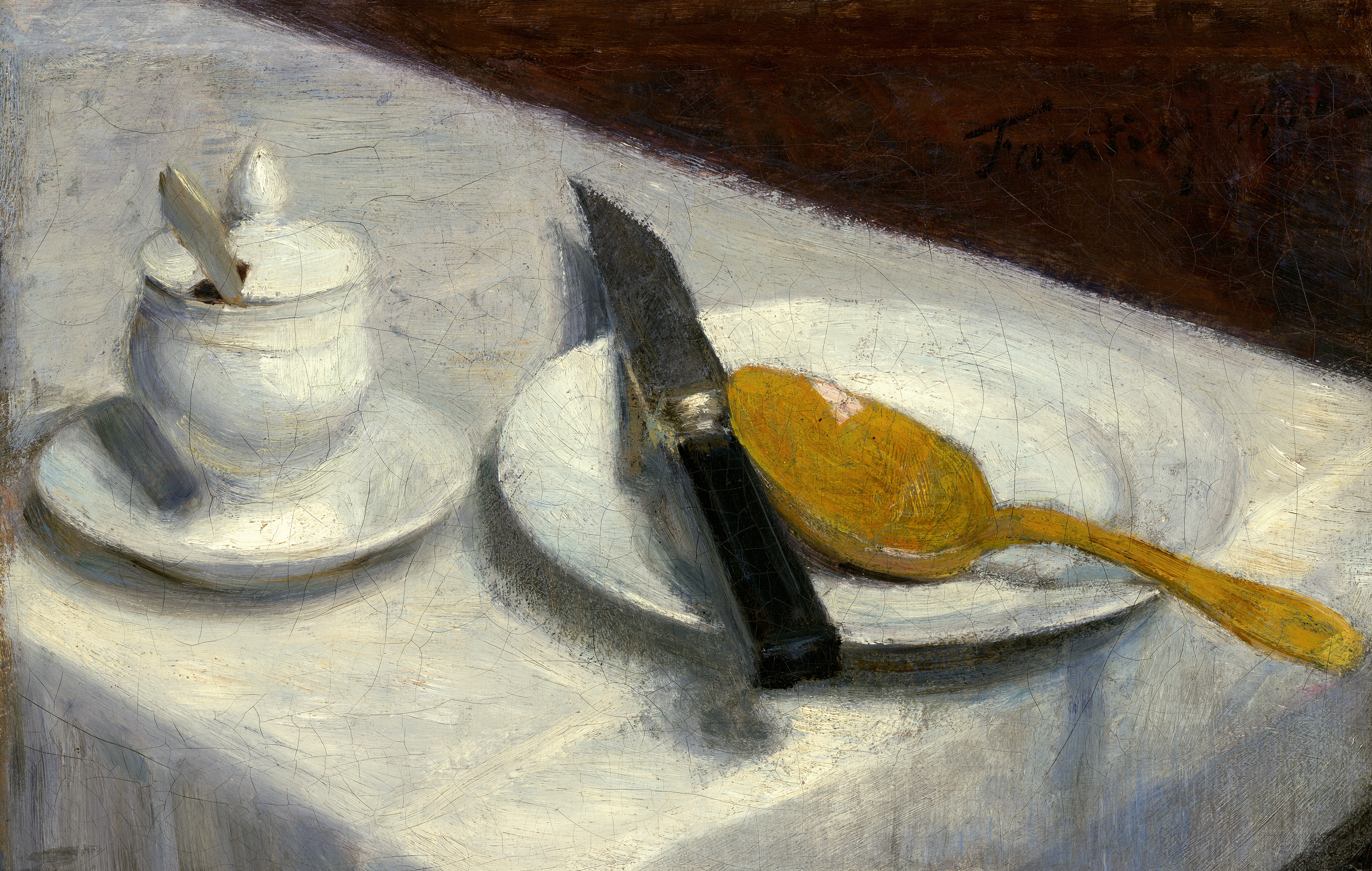
Still Life with Mustard Pot (1860), National Gallery of Art

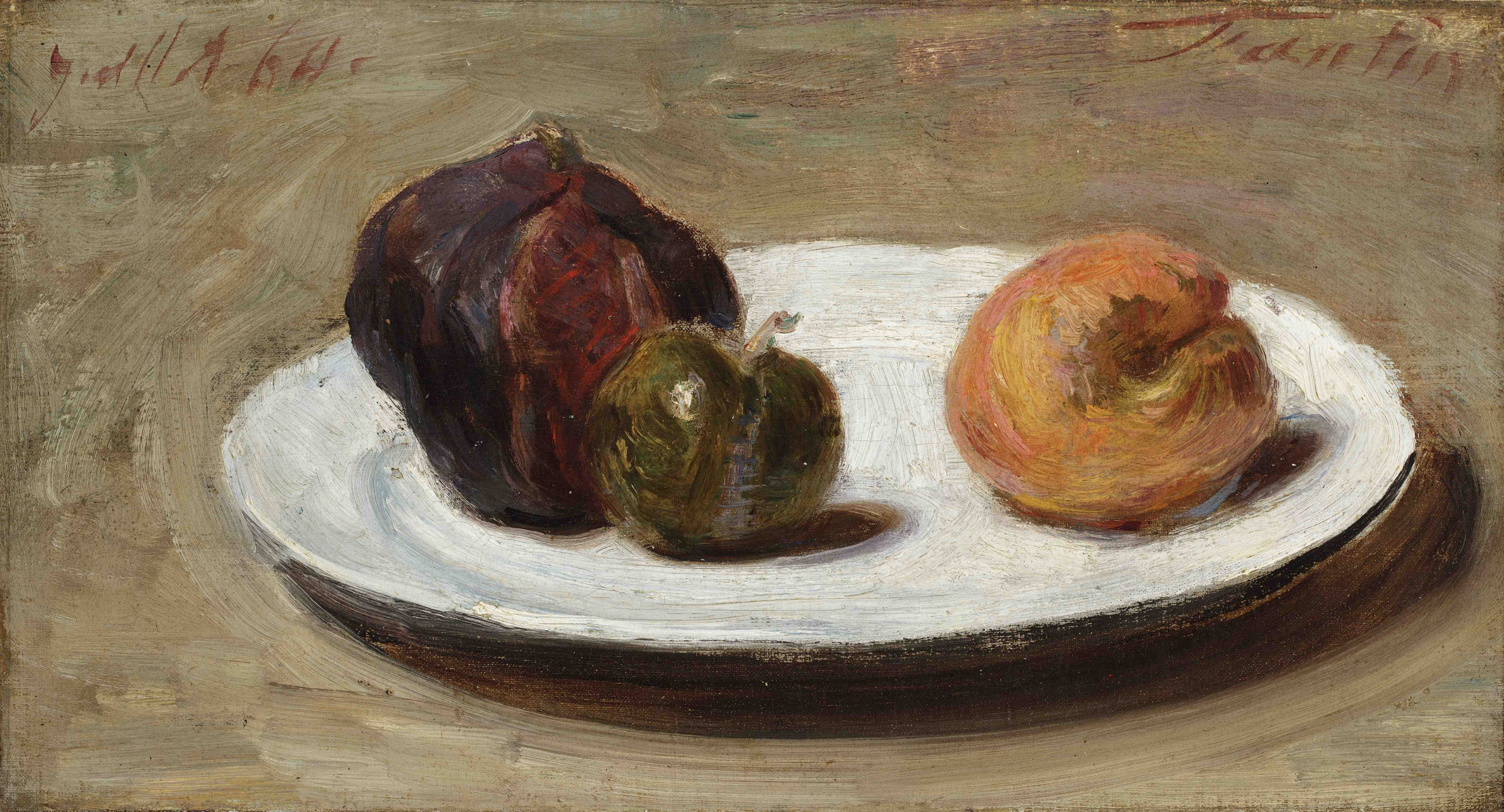
Figues, Reine-Claude et abricot (1864), Mougins Museum of Classical Art

Portraits and allegorical paintings

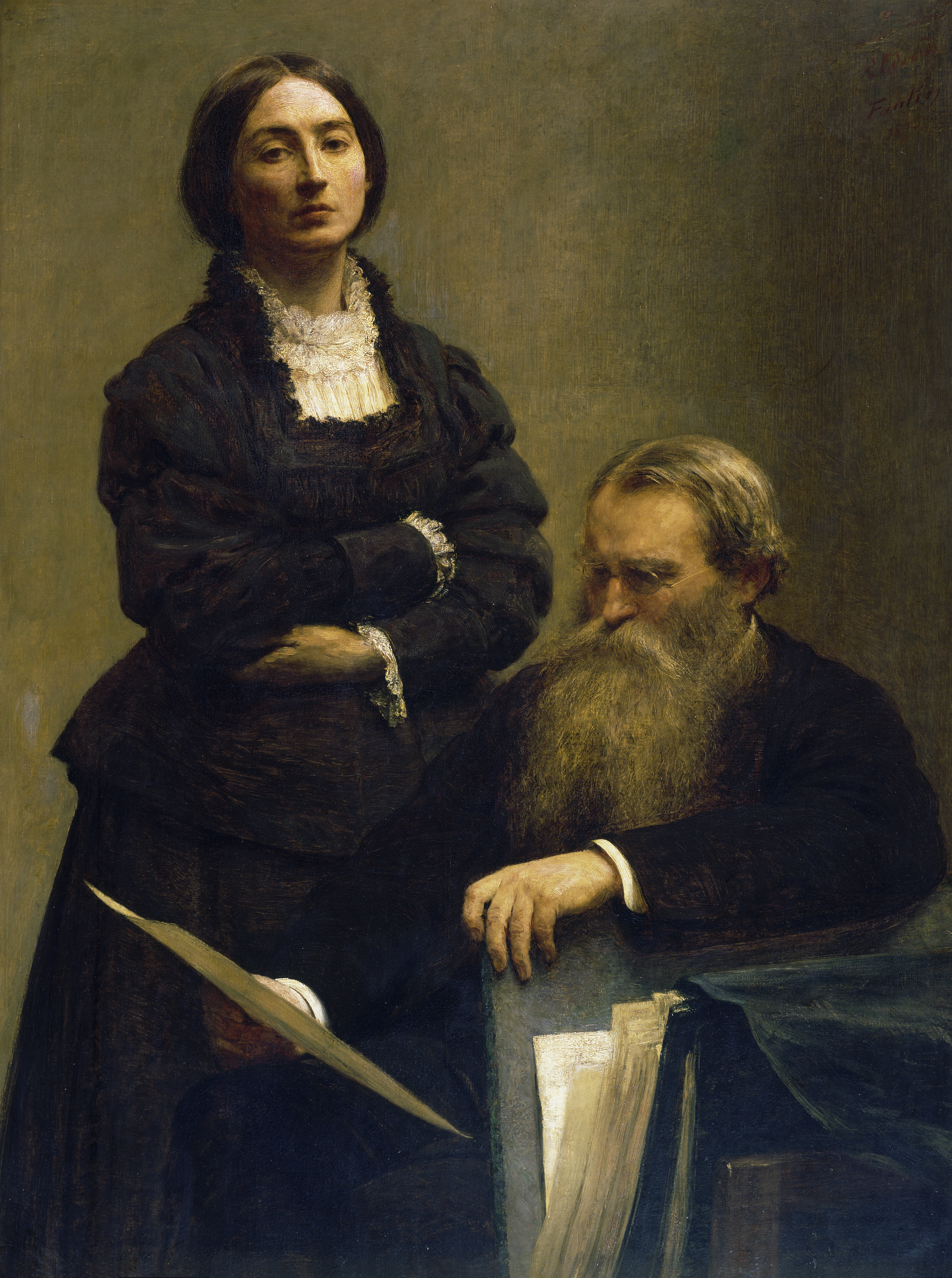
Mr. and Mrs. Edwards (1875), Tate Gallery

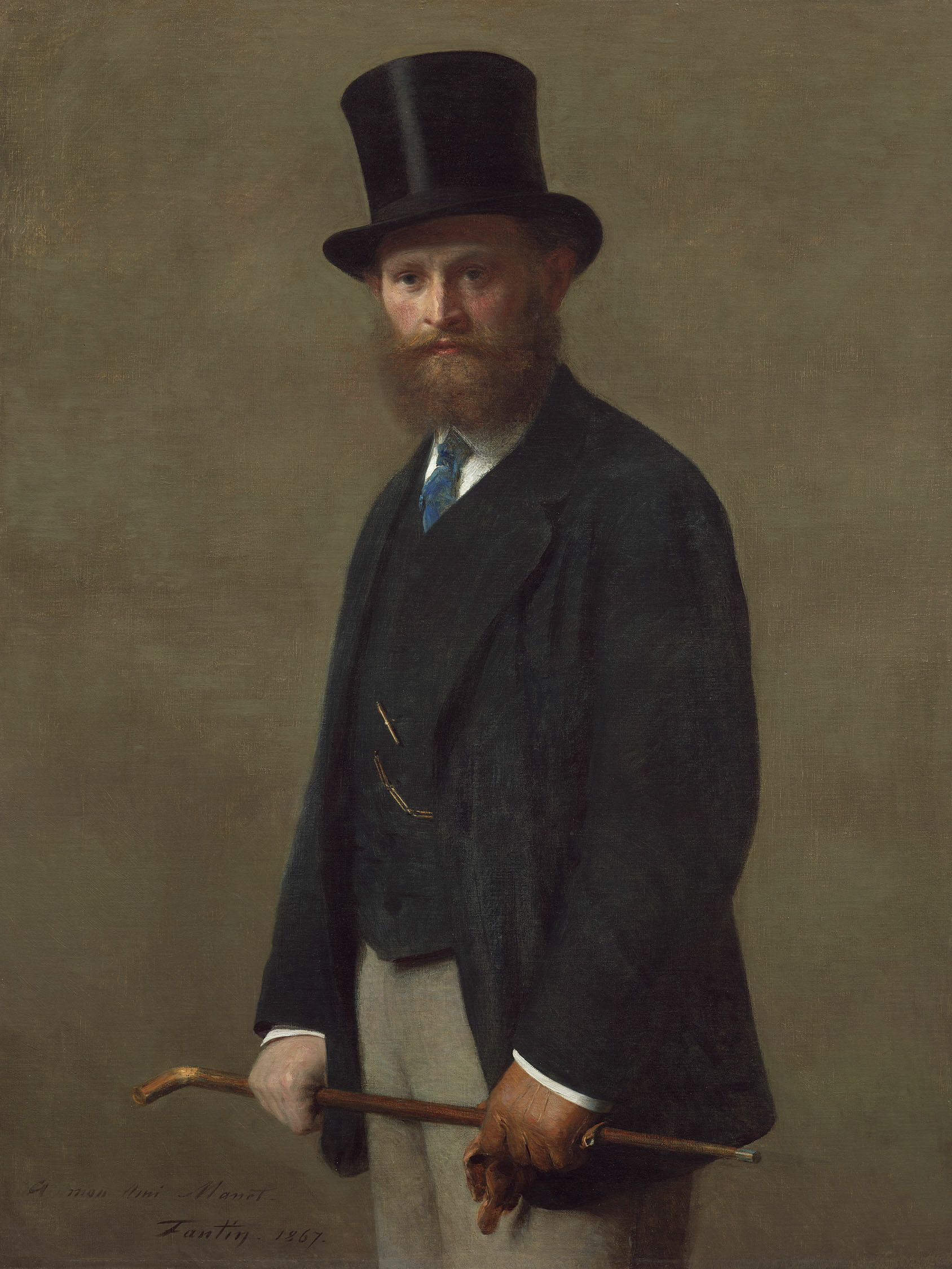
Édouard Manet (1867), Art Institute of Chicago

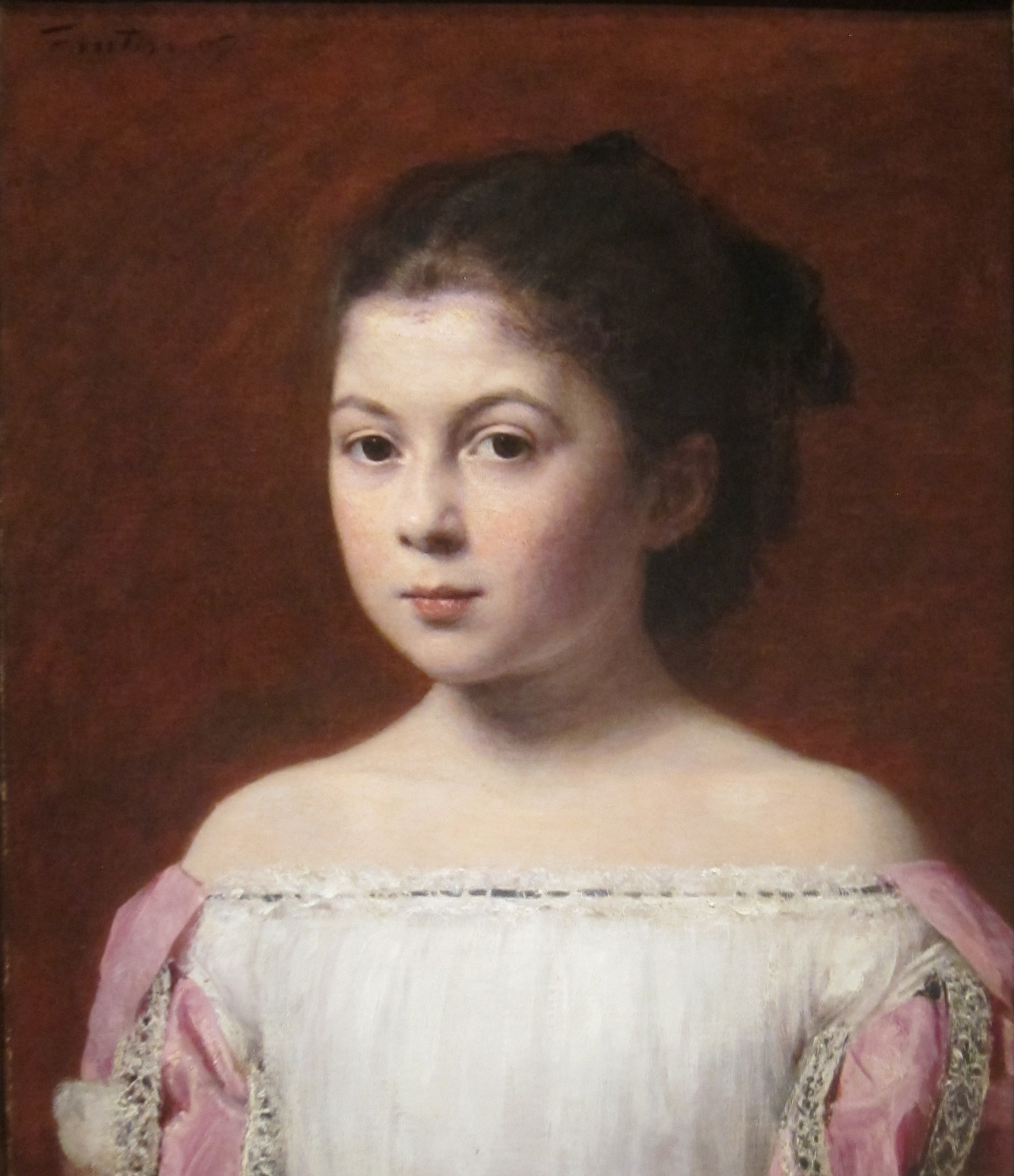
Marie-Yolande de Fitz-James (1867)

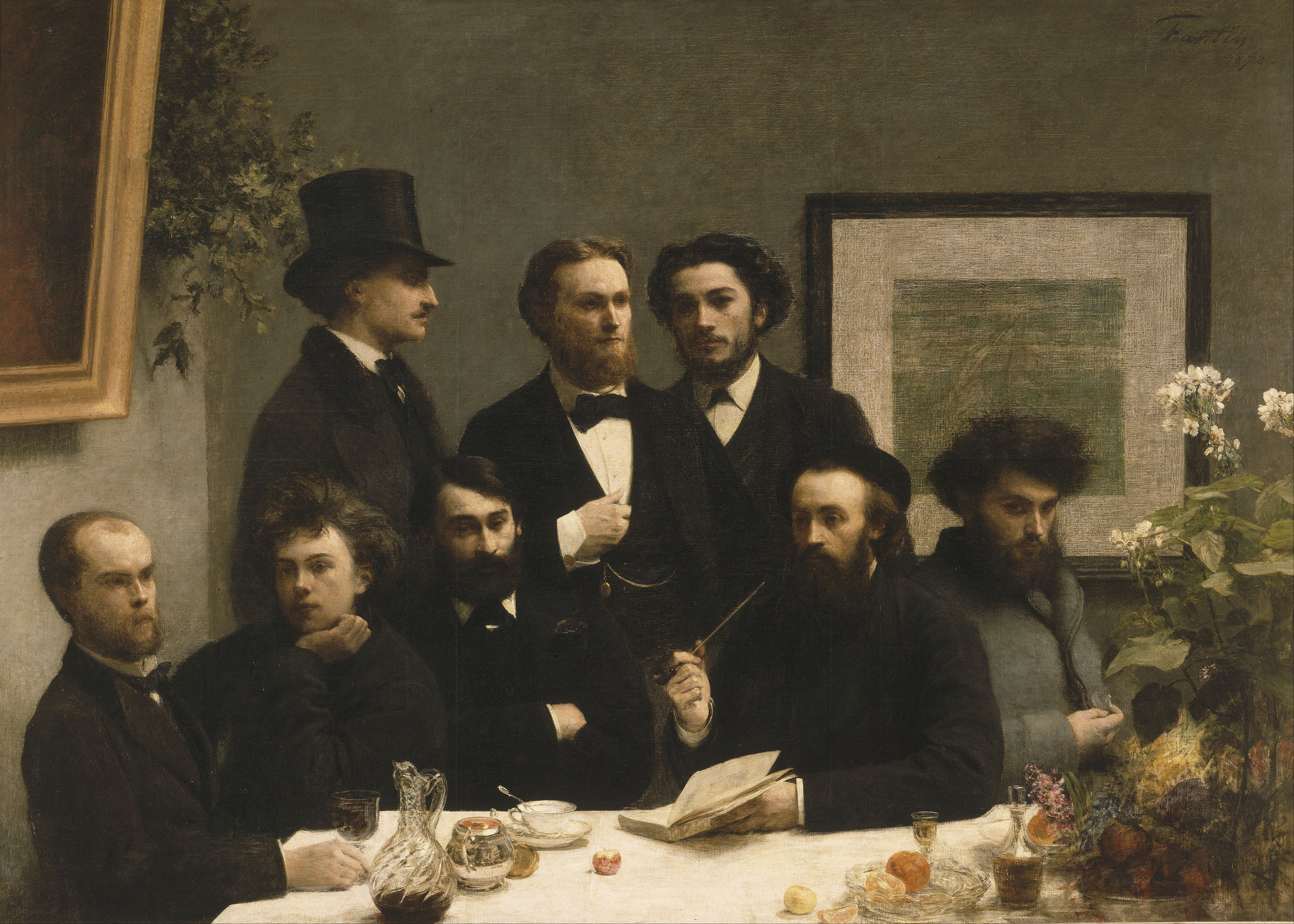
The Corner of the Table (1872)

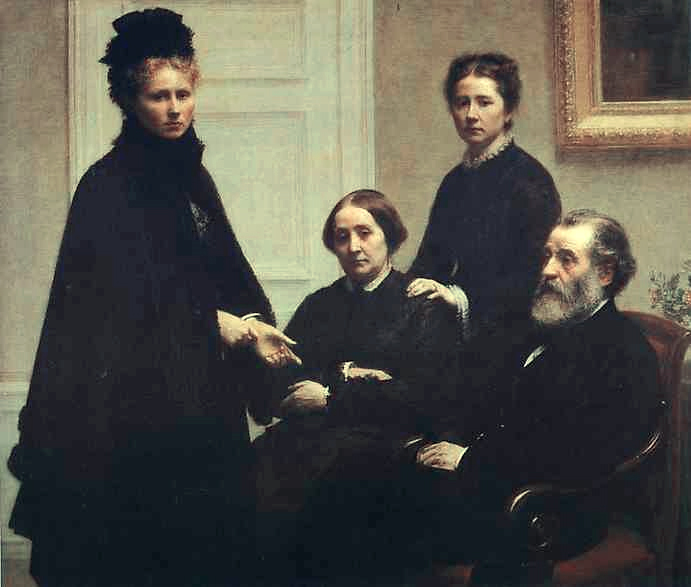
Dubourg Family (1878), Musée d'Orsay

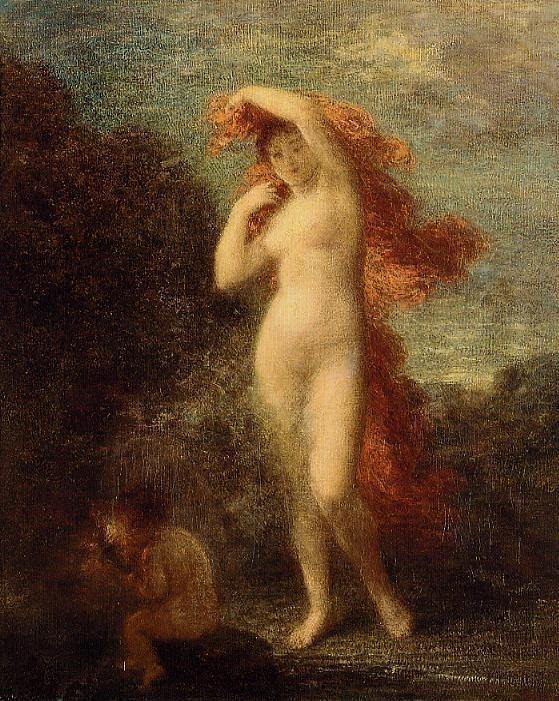
Venus and Cupid (1867)

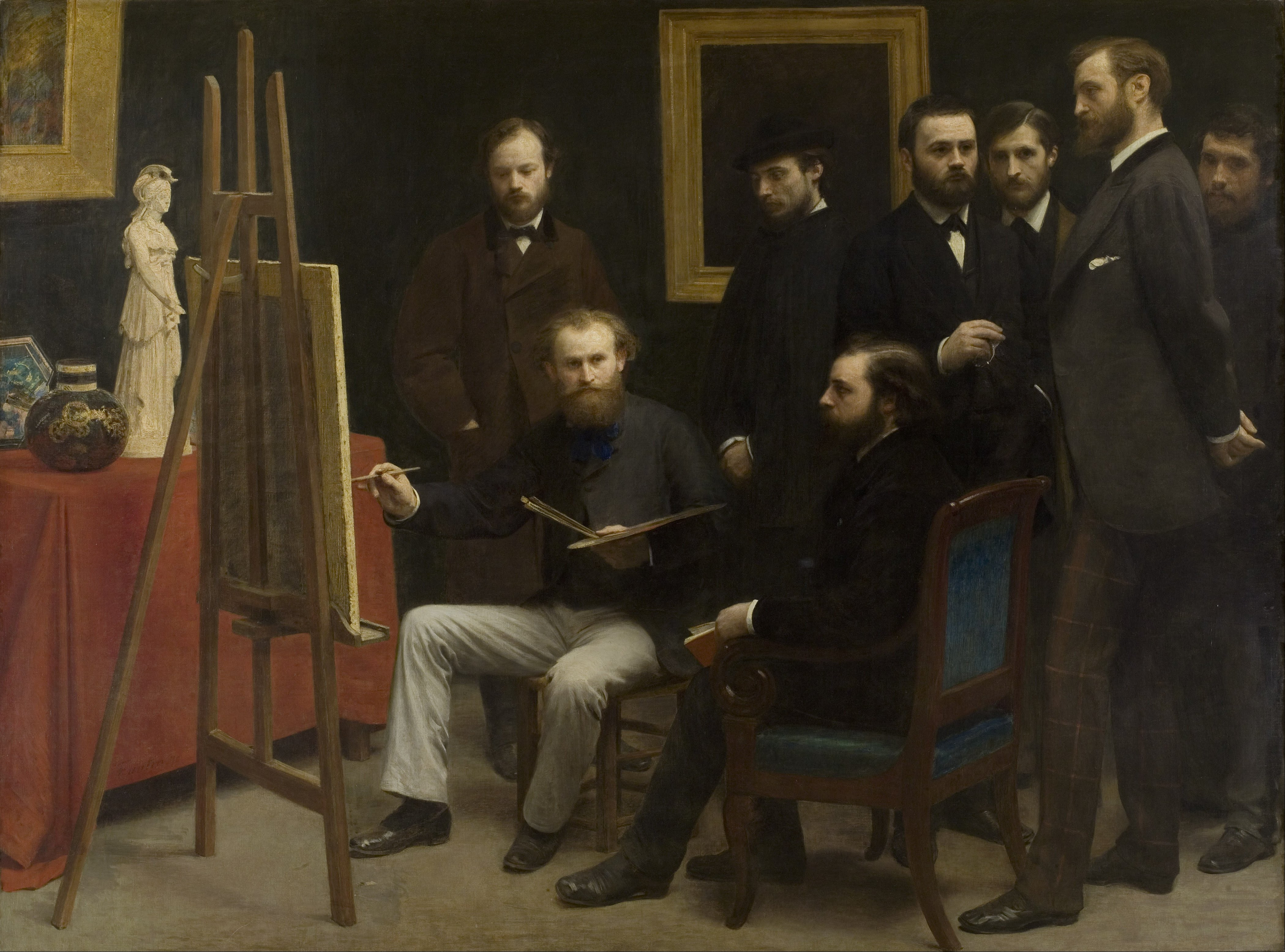
A Studio at Les Batignolles (1870)

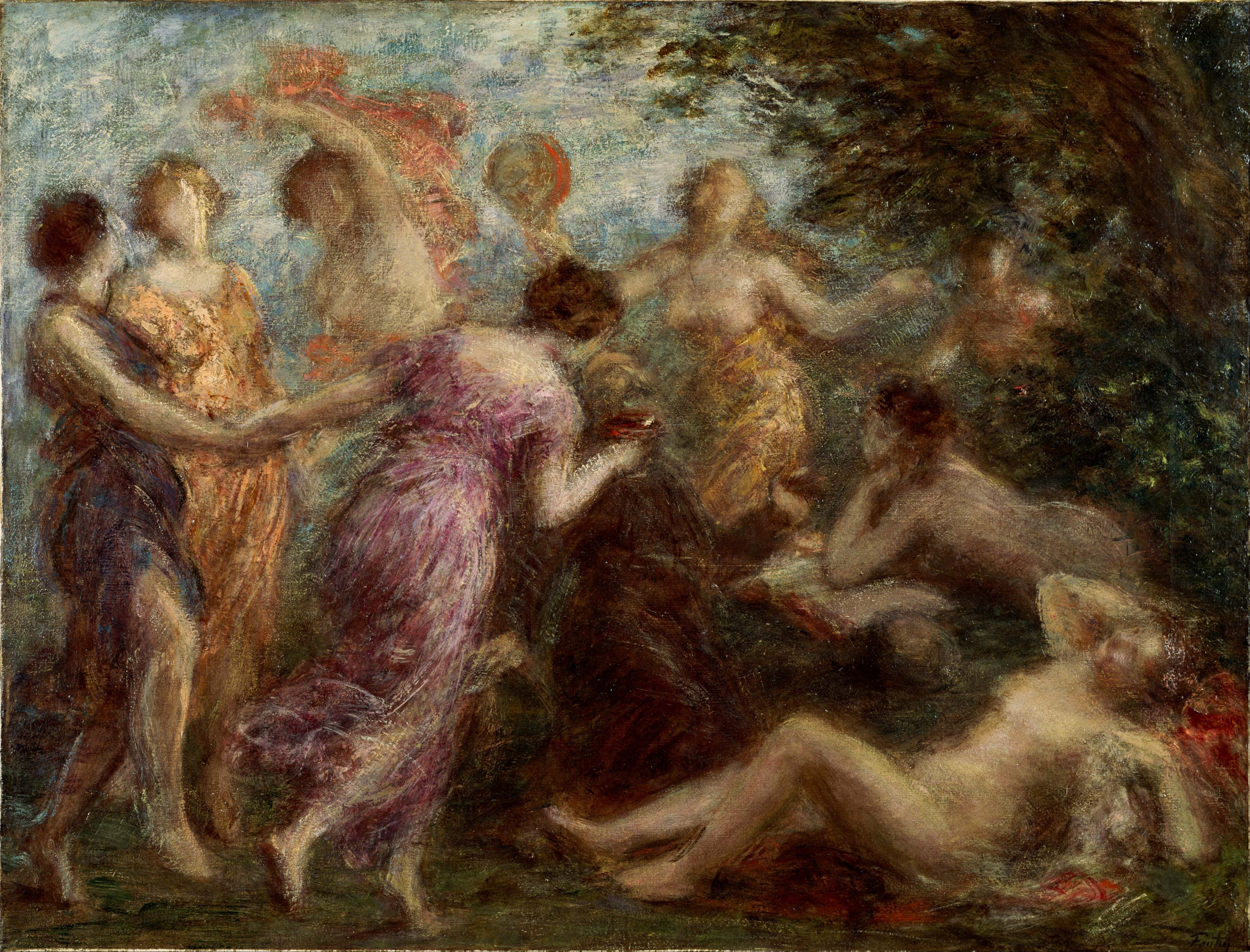
The Temptation of St. Anthony

La Lecture (1877), Musée des Beaux-Arts de Lyon

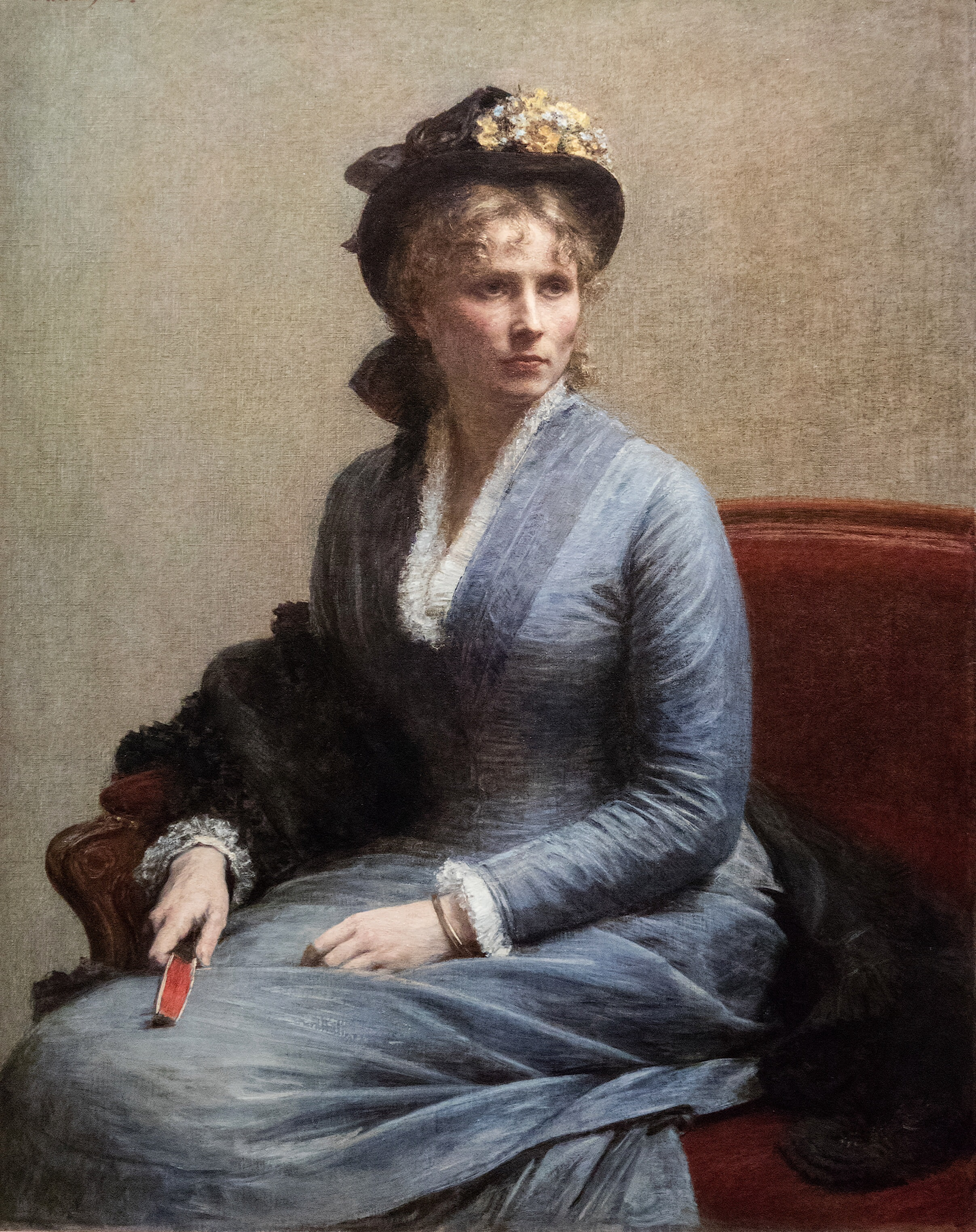
Portrait of Charlotte Dubourg (1882), Paris, musée d'Orsay

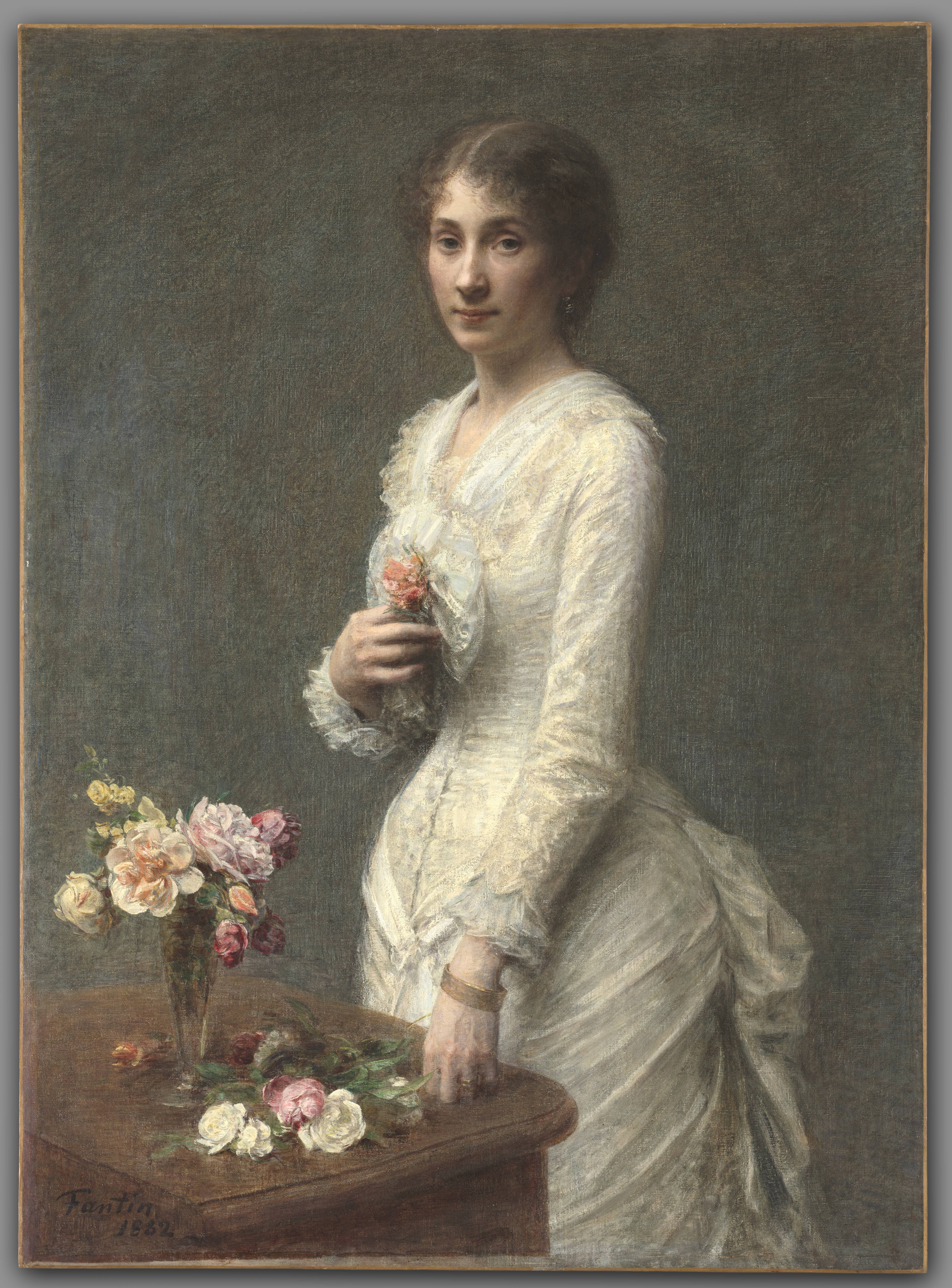
Madame Lerolle (1882)

Portrait of Madame Léon Maître (1882), Brooklyn Museum

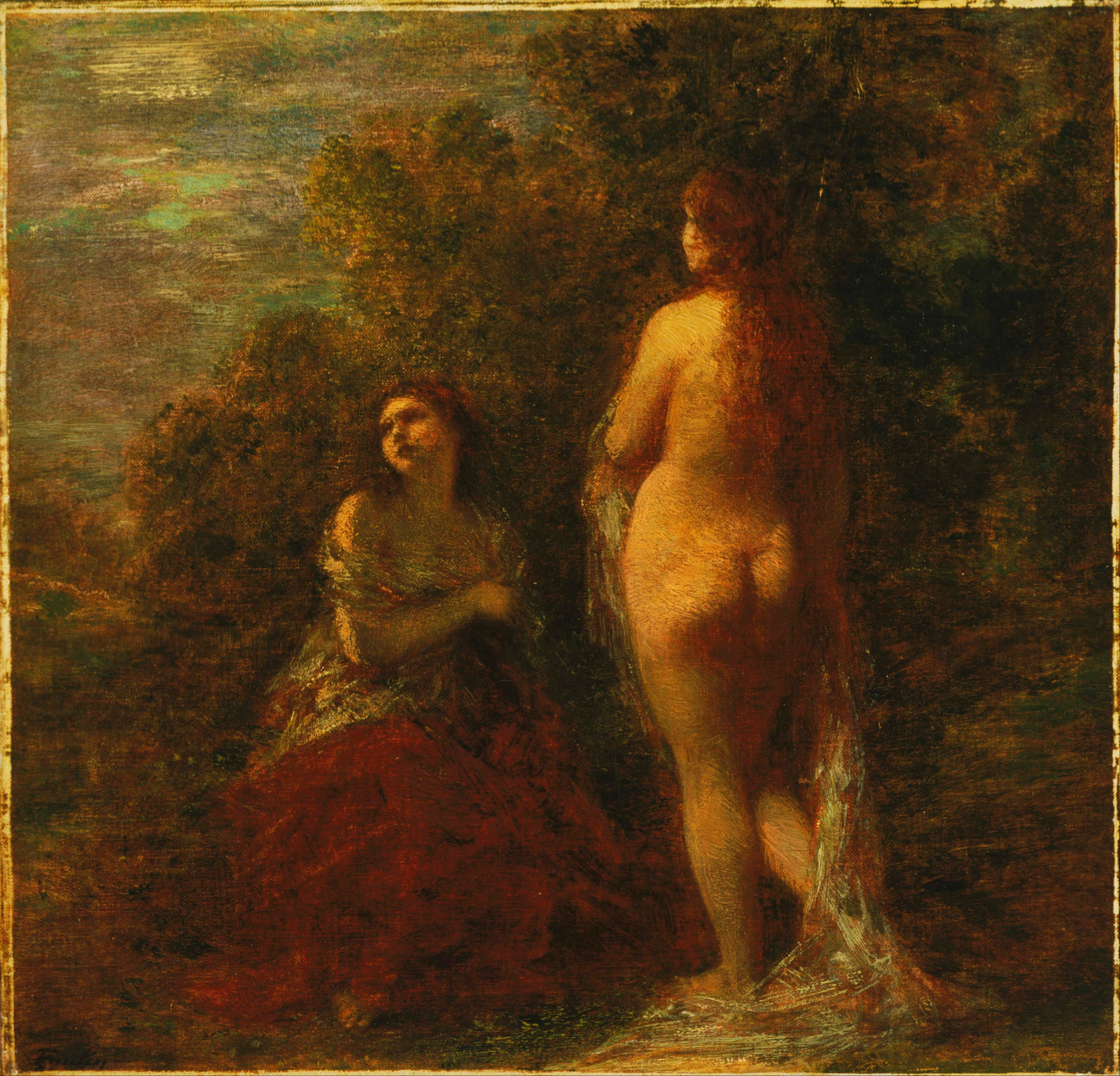
Dawn (c. 1883)

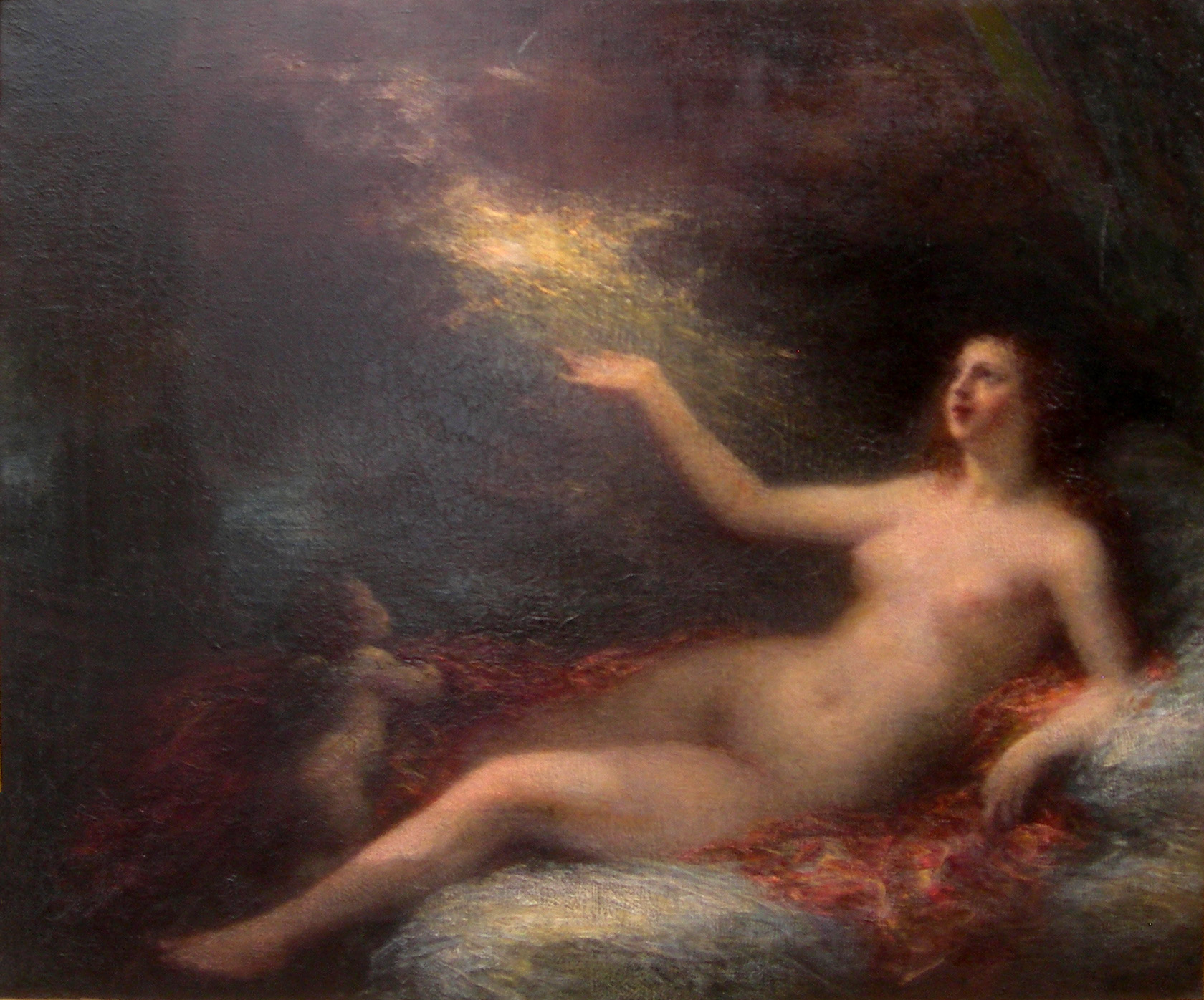
Danae

Sonia (1890), National Gallery of Art

Self-portraits

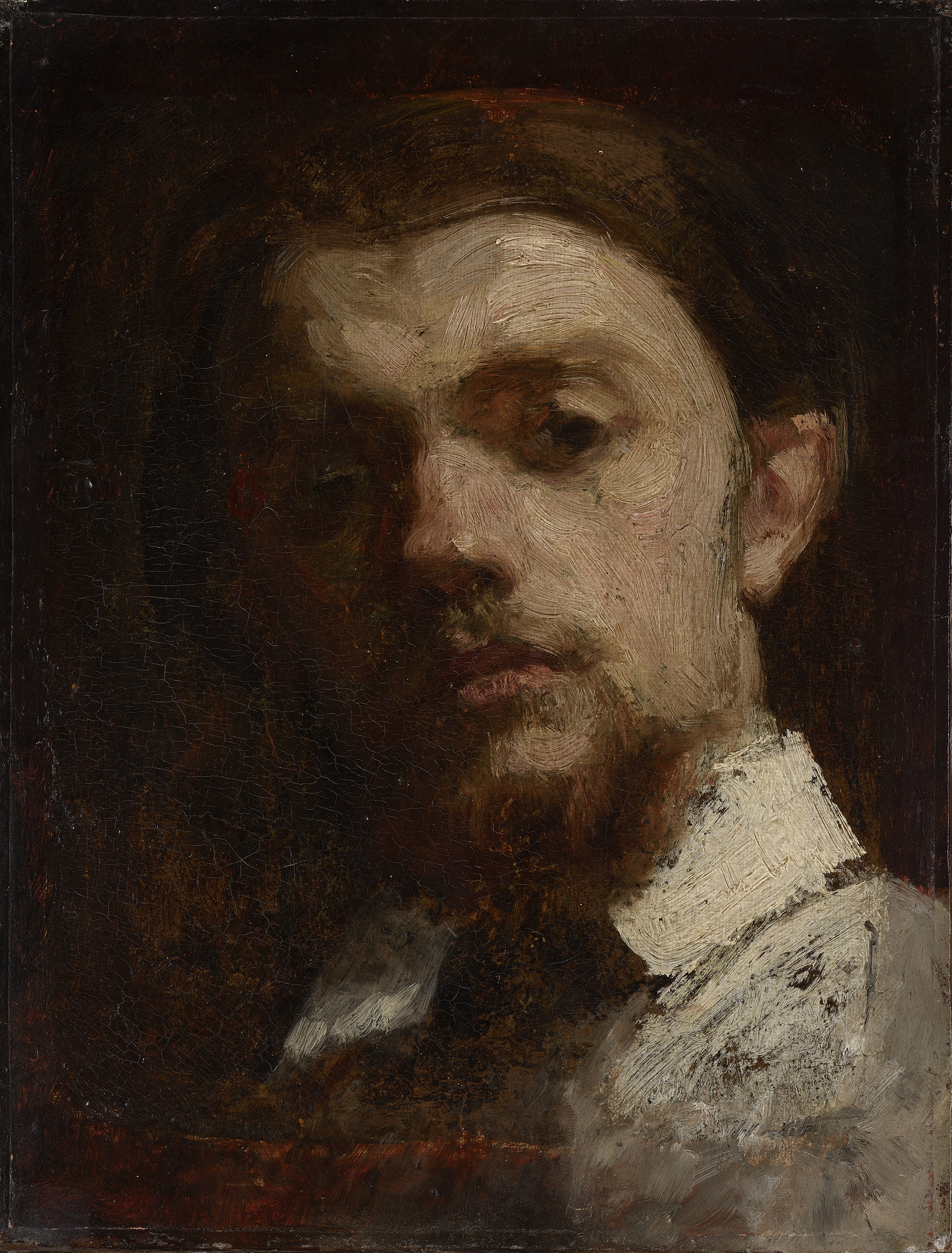
Self-portrait (1859)

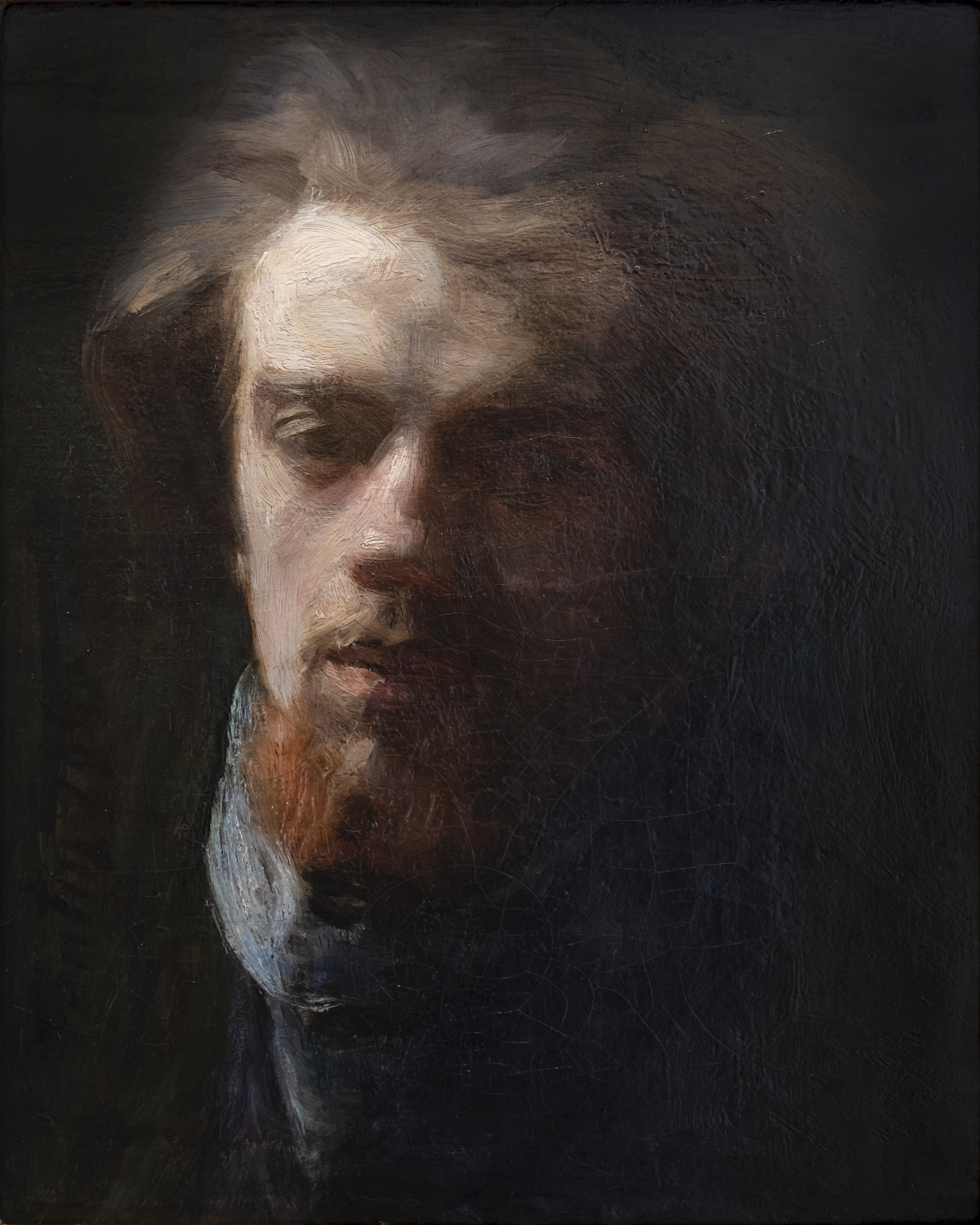
Self-portrait (1860)

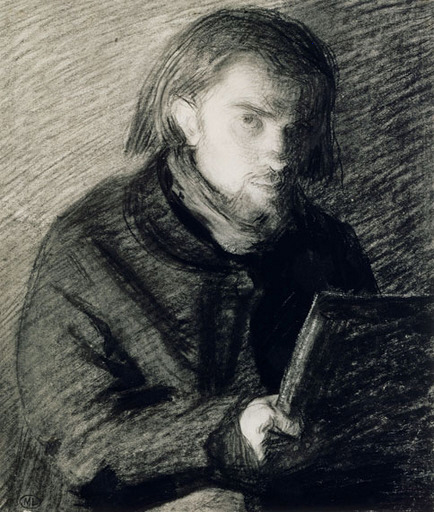
Self-Portrait, pencil, charcoal, and whitening (1860)

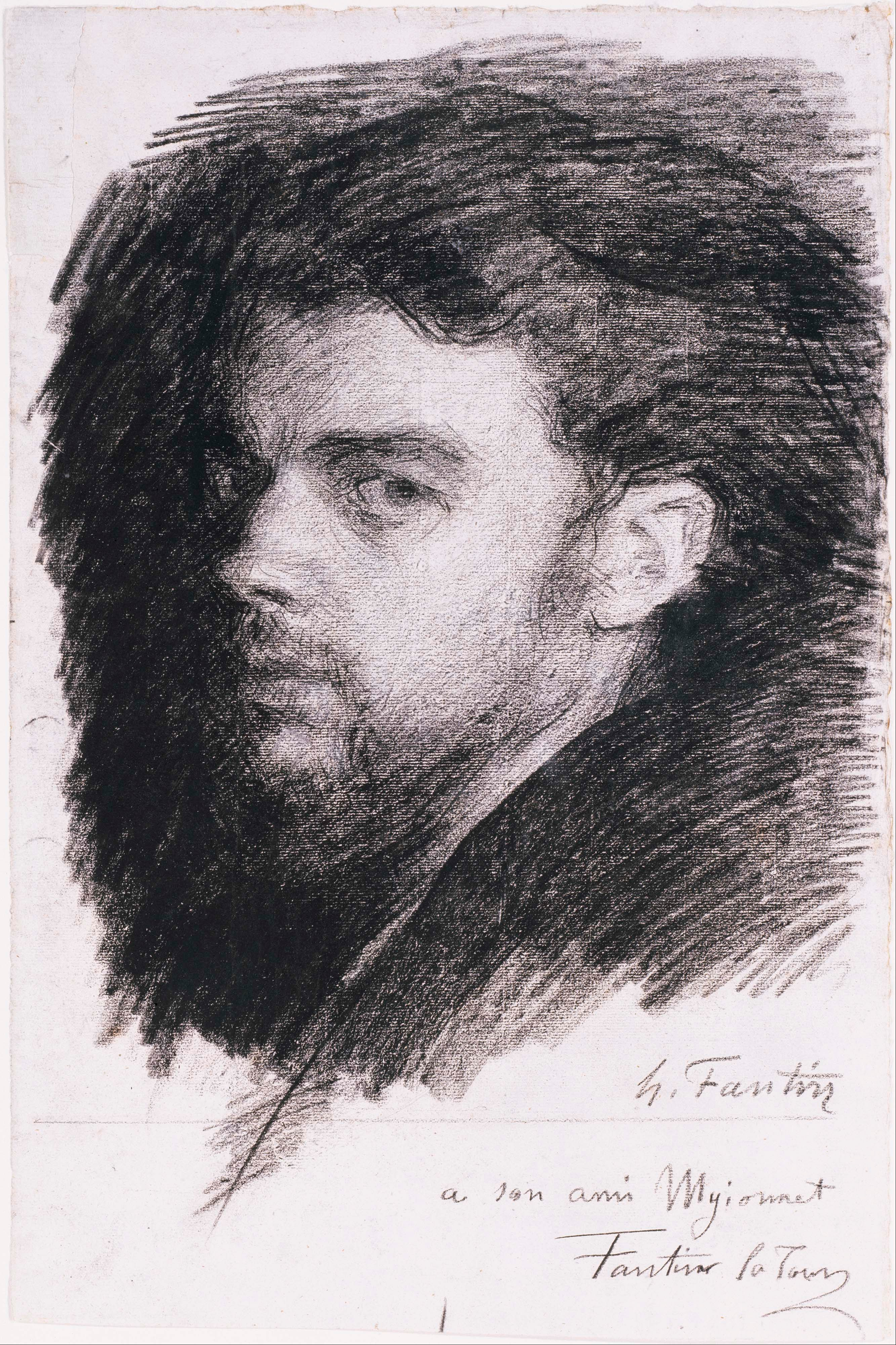
Self-Portrait (1861)

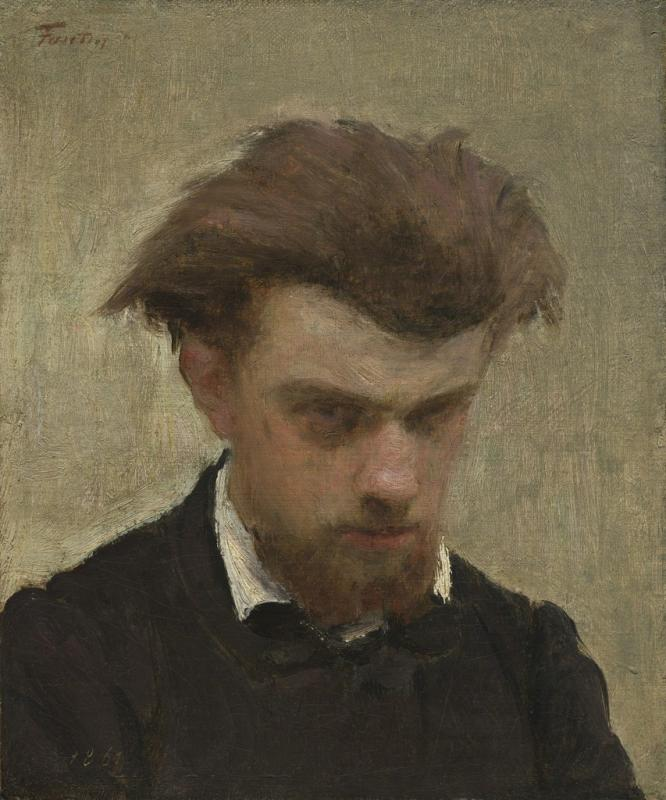
Self-portrait (1861)

== Public collections ==
- Aberdeen Art Gallery (Scotland)
- Armand Hammer Museum of Art (California)
- Art Gallery of New South Wales (Sydney, Australia)
- Art Gallery of the University of Rochester (New York)
- Art Institute of Chicago
- Arthur Ross Gallery (University of Pennsylvania)
- Ashmolean Museum (University of Oxford)
- Birmingham Museums & Art Gallery (UK)
- Bowes Museum (County Durham, England)
- Bristol Museum & Art Gallery (UK)
- British Museum
- Brooklyn Museum
- Carnegie Museum of Art (Pittsburgh, Pennsylvania)
- Clark Art Institute (Williamstown, Massachusetts)
- Cleveland Museum of Art
- Dallas Museum of Art
- Detroit Institute of Arts
- Dixon Gallery and Gardens (Tennessee)
- Fine Arts Museums of San Francisco
- Fitzwilliam Museum (University of Cambridge)
- Fondation Bemberg Museum (Toulouse, France)
- Foundation E.G. Bührle (Zürich)
- Hammer Museum
- Harvard University Art Museums
- Hermitage Museum
- Honolulu Museum of Art
- Indiana University Art Museum
- J. Paul Getty Museum
- Kröller-Müller Museum (Otterlo, Netherlands)
- Lady Lever Art Gallery (UK)
- La Piscine (Roubaix, France)
- Los Angeles County Museum of Art
- MacKenzie Art Gallery (Regina, Saskatchewan)
- Manchester City Art Gallery (UK)
- Metropolitan Museum of Art
- Montreal Museum of Fine Arts, (Canada)
- Museum of Grenoble (France)
- Museum of Modern Art
- Musée de Picardie (Amiens, France)
- Musée des Beaux-Arts de Bordeaux (France)
- Musée des Beaux-Arts de Lyon (France)
- Musée des beaux-arts de Pau (Pau, France)
- Musée des Beaux-Arts (Reims, France)
- Museum Geelvinck (Amsterdam, Netherlands)
- Musée des Beaux-Arts de Rouen (France)
- Musée d'Orsay (Paris)
- Musée du Louvre (Paris)
- Musée des Ursulines (Mâcon, France)
- Museo Nacional de Bellas Artes (Buenos Aires, Argentina)
- Museu Calouste Gulbenkian (Lisbon)
- Museum of Fine Arts, Boston
- National Gallery of Art (Washington D.C.)
- National Gallery of Canada
- National Gallery, London
- National Museum Cardiff
- Nelson-Atkins Museum of Art (Kansas City, Missouri)
- Norton Simon Museum (Pasadena, California)
- Old Jail Art Center (Albany, Texas)
- Philadelphia Museum of Art
- Rijksmuseum (Amsterdam)
- Saint Louis Art Museum
- San Diego Museum of Art
- Smart Museum of Art (University of Chicago)
- Tate Gallery (London)
- Thyssen-Bornemisza Museum
- Toledo Museum of Art (Ohio)
- Université de Liège Collections (Belgium)
- University of Michigan Museum of Art (Ann Arbor)
- Van Gogh Museum
- Victoria and Albert Museum
- Virginia Museum of Fine Arts
- Wadsworth Atheneum (Hartford)
- Winnipeg Art Gallery
