= Albert de Balleroy =

French painter

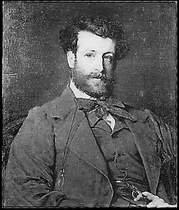
- Born: Albert Felix Justin de la Cour de Balleroy; 15 August 1828; Igé, Orne, France
- Died: 19 August 1872 (aged 44); Hameau de Baudicourt, Sonchamp, Yvelines, Île-de-France, France
- Known for: Painter, peintre-graveur
- Movement: Animalier

Comte Albert Felix Justin de la Cour de Balleroy (15 August 1828 – 19 August 1872) was a French painter, etcher and parliamentarian.

== Biography ==
Both a painter and an etcher, Balleroy specialised in depicting subjects related to hunting. Le Cerf à l'hallali (The Deer at the Hunting Cry) may now be found at the Musée des Beaux-Arts de Caen Le Débuché (Breaking Cover) is at the Victoria and Albert Museum in London, England.

His large canvases often depicted packs of hounds; four hunting scenes are found in the dining room of the Château de Balleroy, and another in the dining room of the Chateau d'Auteuil in Oise.

A friend of Édouard Manet, with whom he shared a studio on the rue Lavoisier in Paris in 1856 — an arrangement which ended after the dramatic episode of the suicide of Alexandre, the model for the painting Le Gamin à la toque rouge — Balleroy was also a regular visitor to the house of commandant Hippolyte Lejosne.

Manet represented him in his work Music in the Tuileries, as did Henri Fantin-Latour in his Homage to Delacroix which depicted ten artists of the new generation grouped around a self-portrait of the master Eugène Delacroix, carrying on the flag of modernity.

From 1853 to 1870, Albert de Balleroy regularly exhibited at the Salon, showing pack-hound hunting and animal scenes, at the same time demonstrating his skills as a portrait artist.

In 1871, Balleroy was elected a member of the National Assembly, representing Calvados.

Château de Balleroy, the family's historic residence that was returned in 1827, was visited by Marcel Proust for whom it served as inspiration for the home of the Guermantes family in his In Search of Lost Time; the writer included Albert de Balleroy in the book through the character of the late Guermantes, who was a lover of hunting paintings.

== Bibliography ==
- Monneret, Sophie (1987). Robert Laffont (ed.). L'Impressionnisme et son époque [Impressionism and its era] (in French). Vol. 2. Paris. ISBN 2-221-05412-1.
- "Albert de Balleroy", in Robert and Cougny, Dictionnaire des parlementaires français, 1889

== Gallery ==
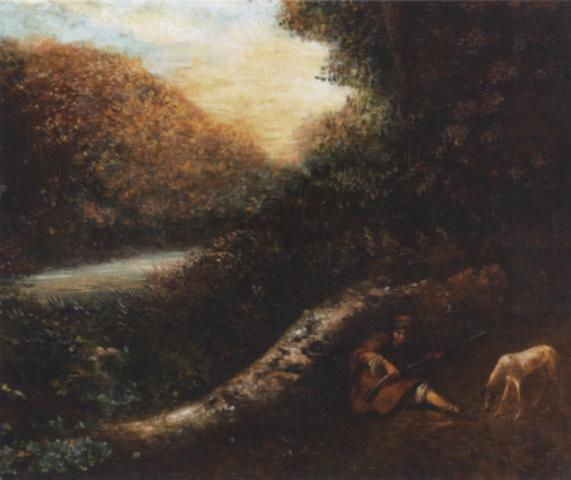
The Hunt by Albert de Balleroy

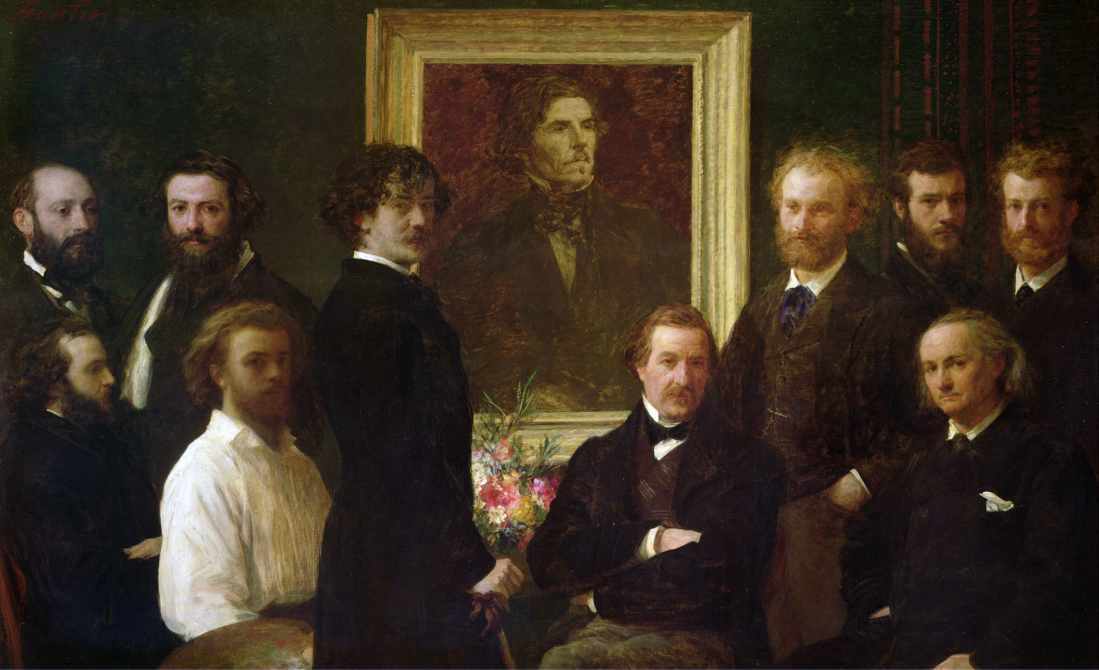
Homage to Delacroix, 1864, by Henri Fantin-Latour, showing Balleroy in the background on the right, behind Charles Baudelaire.

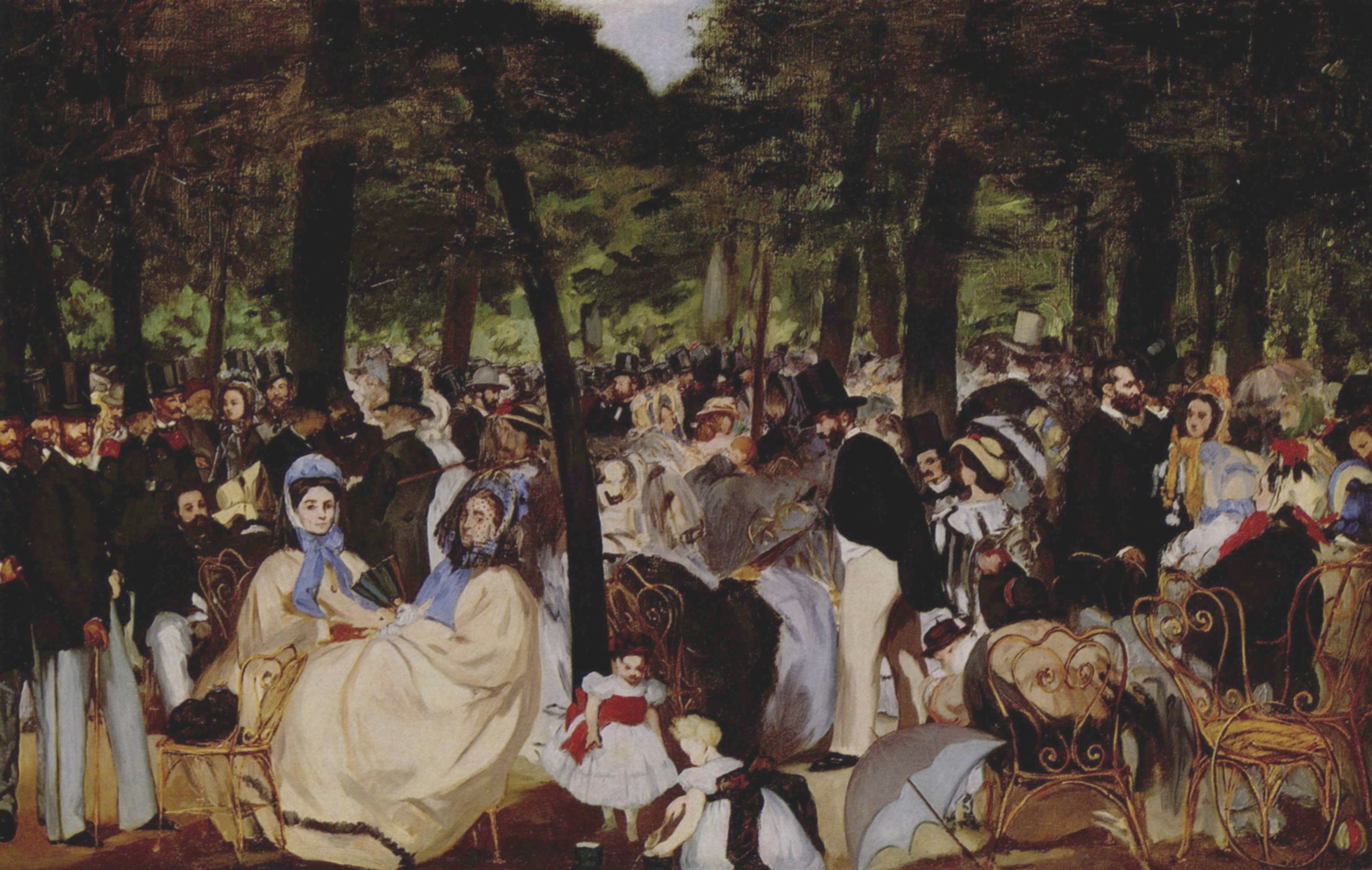
Music in the Tuileries, 1862, by Édouard Manet where Balleroy is shown seated
