= Portrait of Earl Haig =

Painting by William Orpen

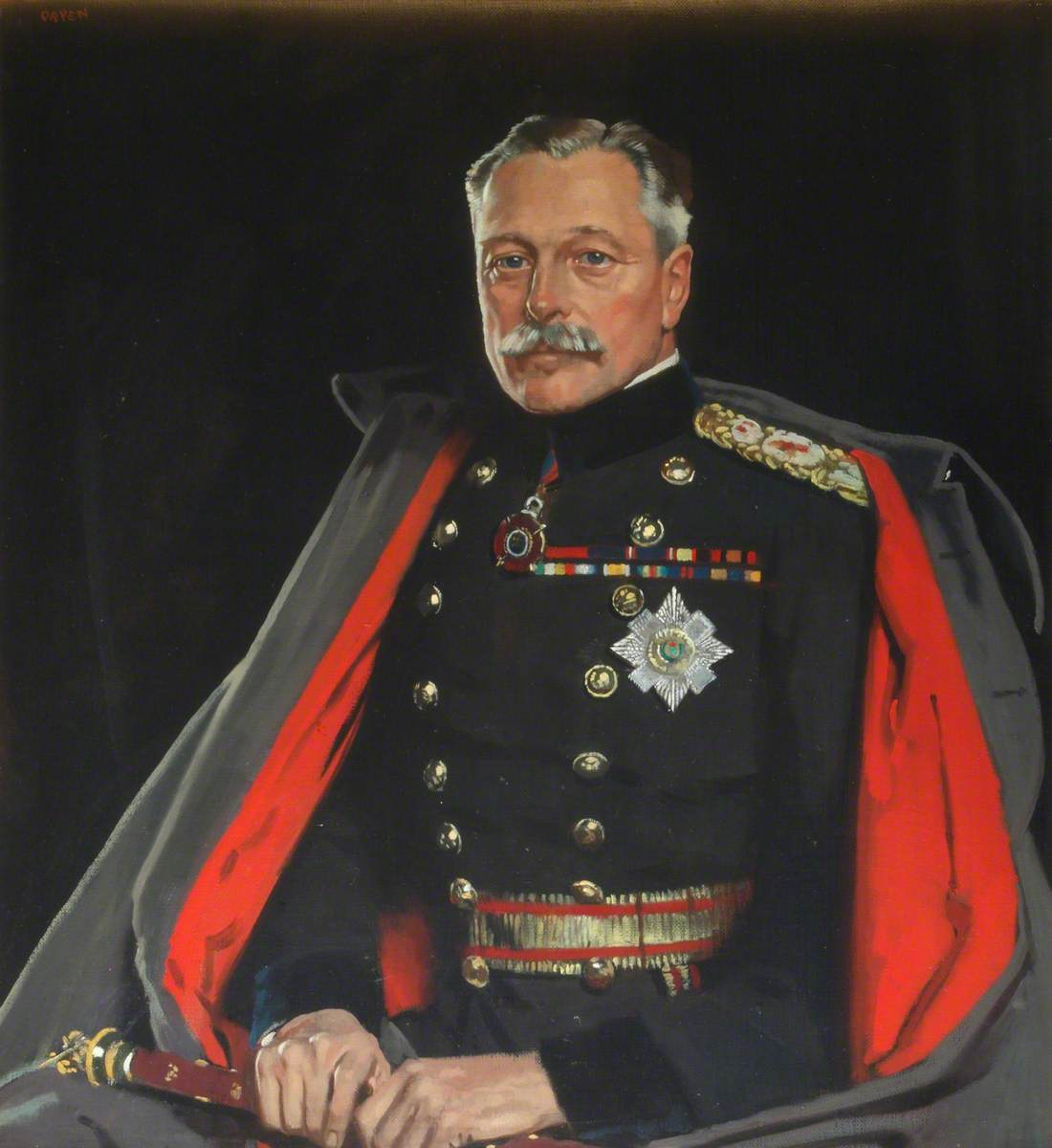
- Artist: William Orpen
- Year: 1921
- Type: Oil on canvas, portrait painting
- Dimensions: 120 cm × 110 cm (47 in × 43 in)
- Location: Brasenose College, Oxford

Portrait of Earl Haig is a 1921 portrait painting by the Irish artist William Orpen. It depicts Field Marshal Douglas Haig, 1st Earl Haig, known for his command of the British Army on the Western Front during the First World War. Orpen had served as a war artist in France and in 1917 had produced a portrait of Haig at his headquarters at Montreuil-sur-Mer, now in the Imperial War Museum. They two men friends until Haig's death in 1928.

The painting was displayed at the Royal Academy Exhibition of 1921 held at Burlington House in London. In 1922 it was acquired by Brasenose College in Oxford, which Haig had attended.

== See also ==
- List of paintings by William Orpen

== Bibliography ==
- Arnold, Bruce. Orpen: Mirror to an Age. Jonathan Cape, 1981.
- Crook, Mordaunt J. Brasenose: The Biography of an Oxford College. Oxford University Press, 2008.
- Upstone, Robert & Jenkins, David Fraser. William Orpen: Politics, Sex & Death. Philip Wilson, 2005.
- Walsh, Michael J.K (ed.) The Great War and the British Empire: Culture and Society. Taylor & Francis, 2016.
- Warner, Philip. Field Marshal Earl Haig. Bodley Head, 1991.
