= Château de Balleroy =

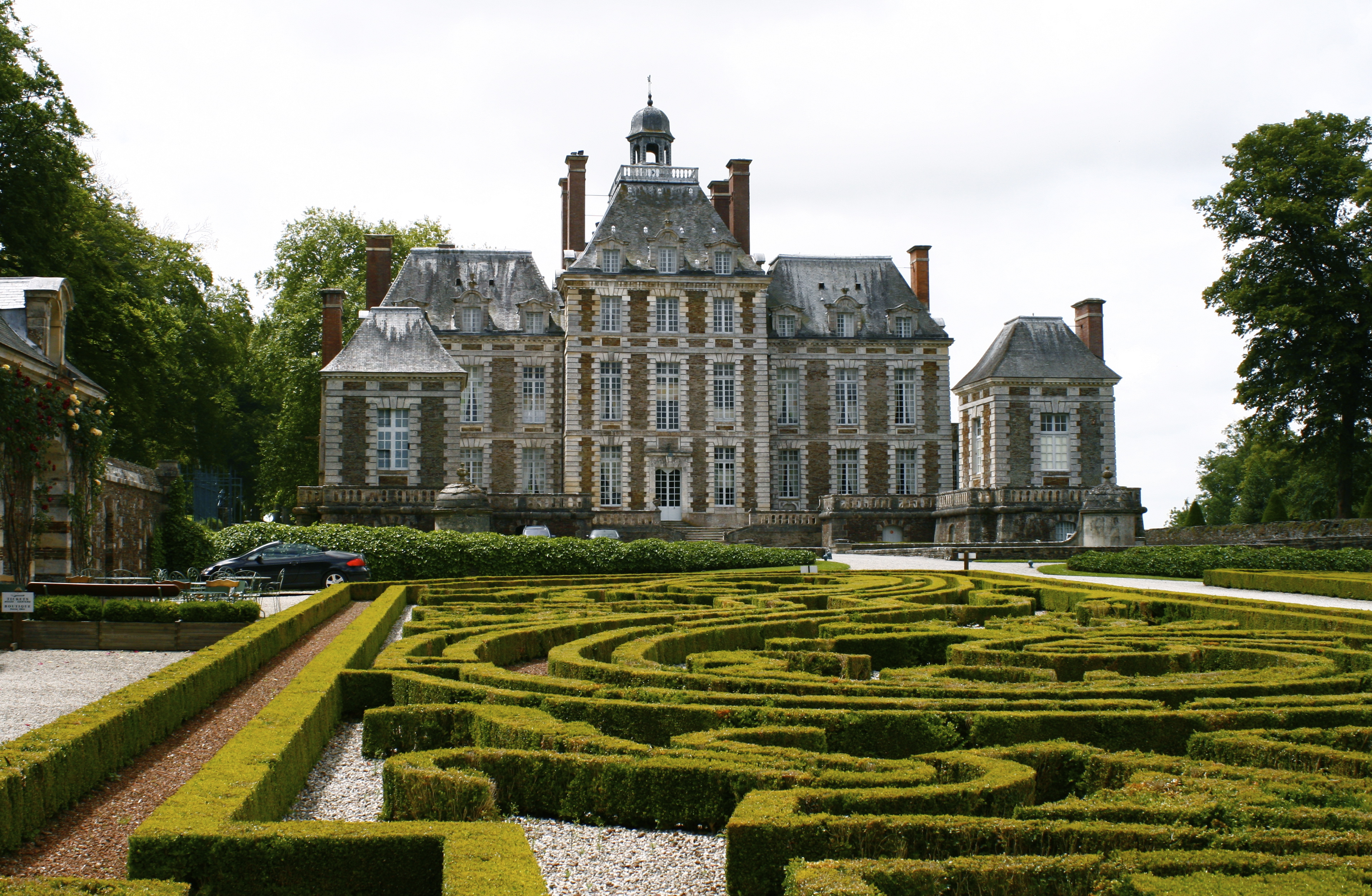
- The facade and box hedge maze.
- Interactive map of the Château de Balleroy area

General information
- Location: Calvados, Balleroy, Basse-Normandie, Normandy, France
- Coordinates: 49.1792°N 0.8430°W
- Construction started: 17th C
- Construction stopped: 17th C
- Owner: Jean de Choisy (original)

Website
- http://www.chateau-balleroy.fr/en/

The Château de Balleroy (French pronunciation: [ʃato də baləʁwa]) is a seventeenth-century château in Balleroy, Normandy.

== Outlook ==
The fief of Balleroy, near the forest and abbey of Cerisy, was acquired on April 1, 1600 by Jean de Choisy, wine supplier at the court of Henry IV.

The castle was built from 1626 to 1636 by his son, Jean II de Choisy who became State Councilor and chancellor of Gaston, Duke of Orléans, brother of Louis XIII, who hired architect François Mansart from 1634 for the reconstruction of the château de Blois.

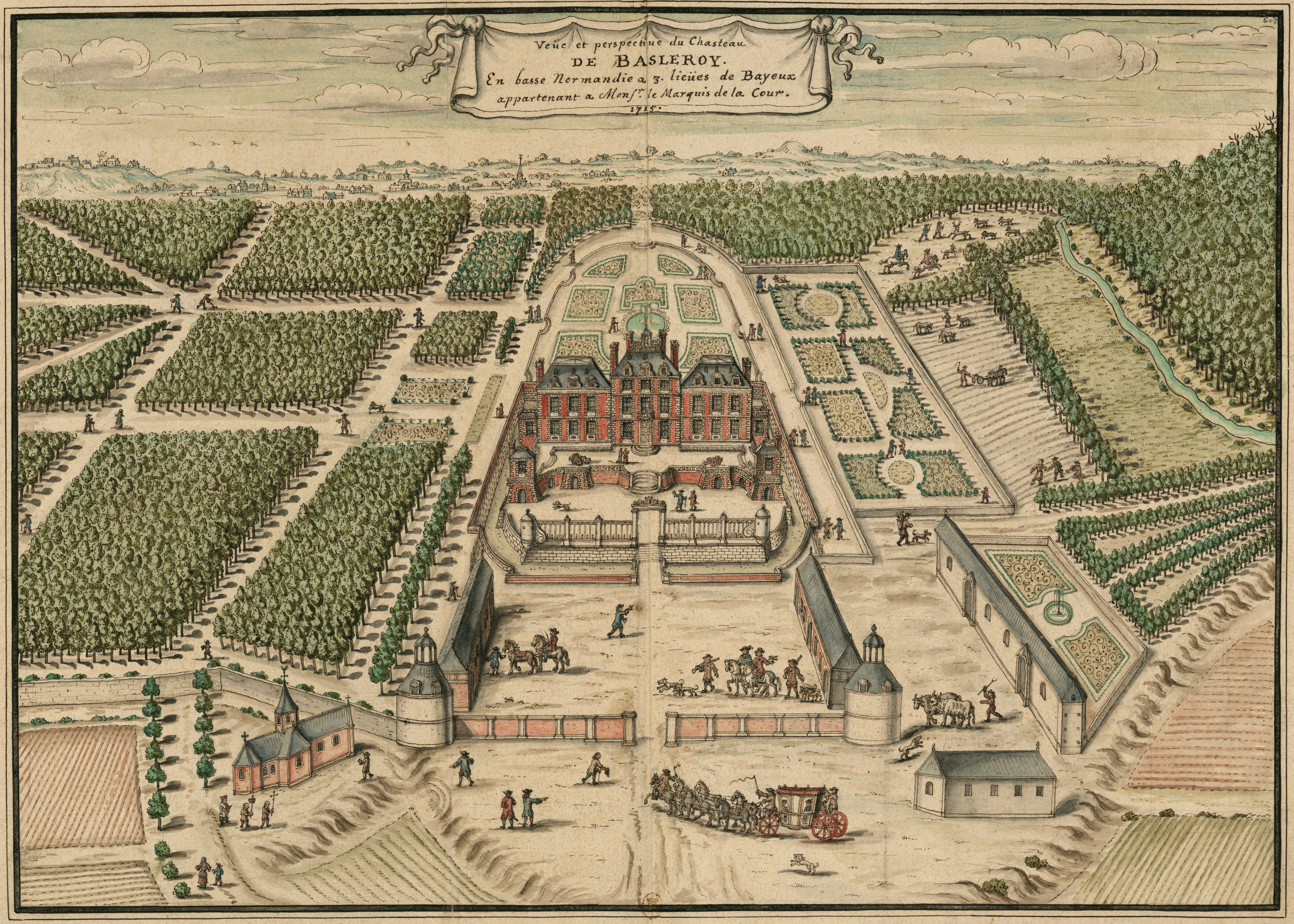
1715 perspective, by Louis Boudan

=== An architectural Louis XIII chef d'œuvre ===
The architect François Mansart, who had already drafted the plans of the château de Berny, a remodeled dwelling for chancellor Pierre Brûlart de Sillery (1624-1625), came frequently to Balleroy from 1632 to 1634 and consigned the old plans of the former castle and village, that were shifted and laid around a main axis to enable a view on road, avenue or honorary path, moderate slope, cour d'honneur framed by two square, long, low, common pavillons, covering floors of boxwood scrollwork, and a terrace surrounded by a balustrade.

A modern œuvre, which marks a turning point in the history of French architecture.

Built in bricks, schist and pierre de Caen, the castle has a central pavillon topped by a roof lantern flanked by two lower buildings. The others are set around the gardens draughted by André Le Nôtre.

The interior of the castle offers a grand salon remarkable for its paintings of Pierre Mignard : Le Char du Soleil, portraits of Louis XIII and the family of his son Louis XIV, wanted by Mme de Choisy.

The jardin à la française is made up of low boxwood hedges and a flanked terrasse of two pavillons. The castle dominates the river Drôme.

The garden is cited by Philippe Thébaud among the 300 prettiest gardens in France.

The castle is ranked as a monument historique since January 18, 1951 in France.

=== Balloon Museum ===
One of the pavilions hosts the Ballons museum, by Malcolm Forbes, which contains documents on the Montgolfier brothers.

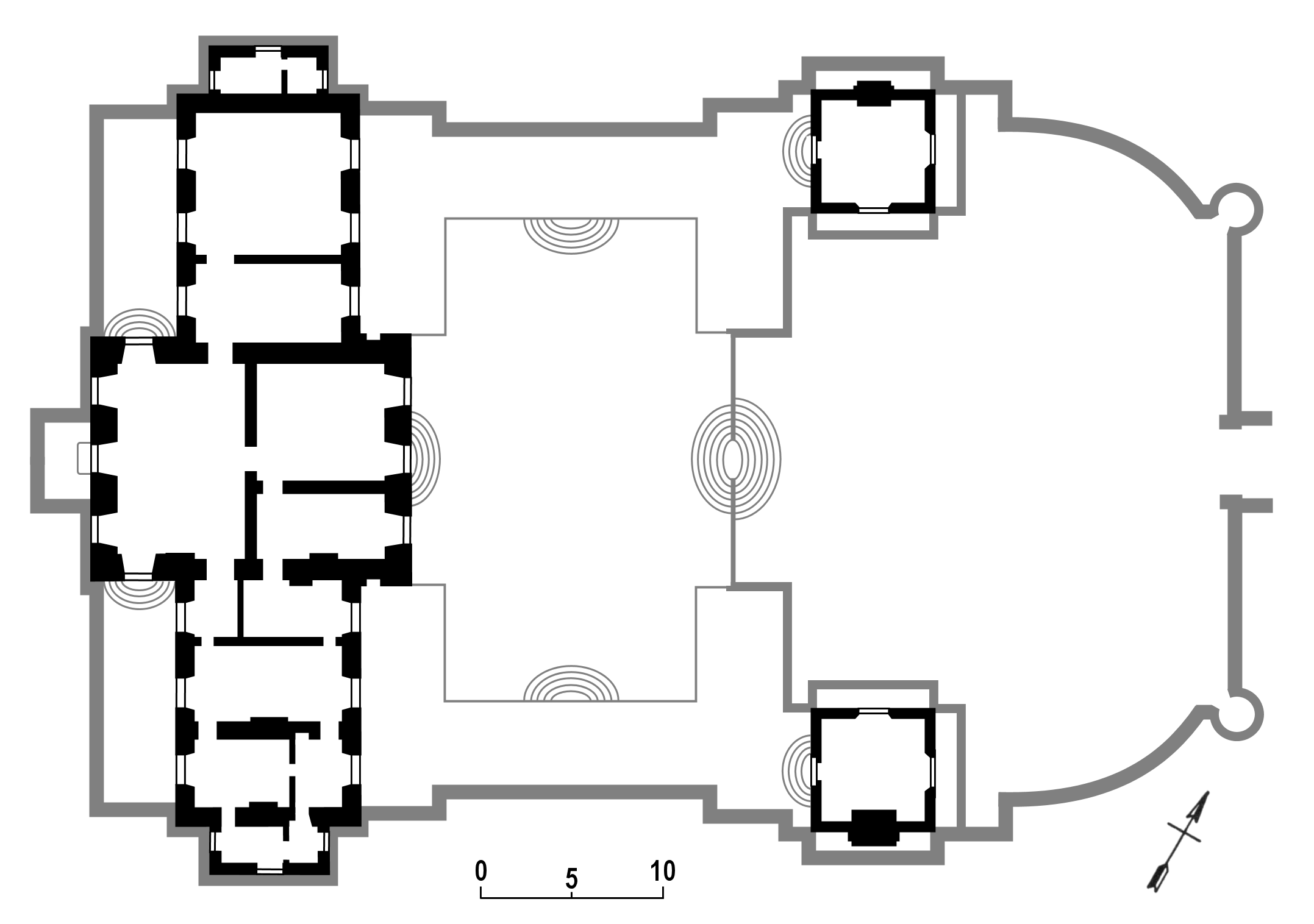
Draughts

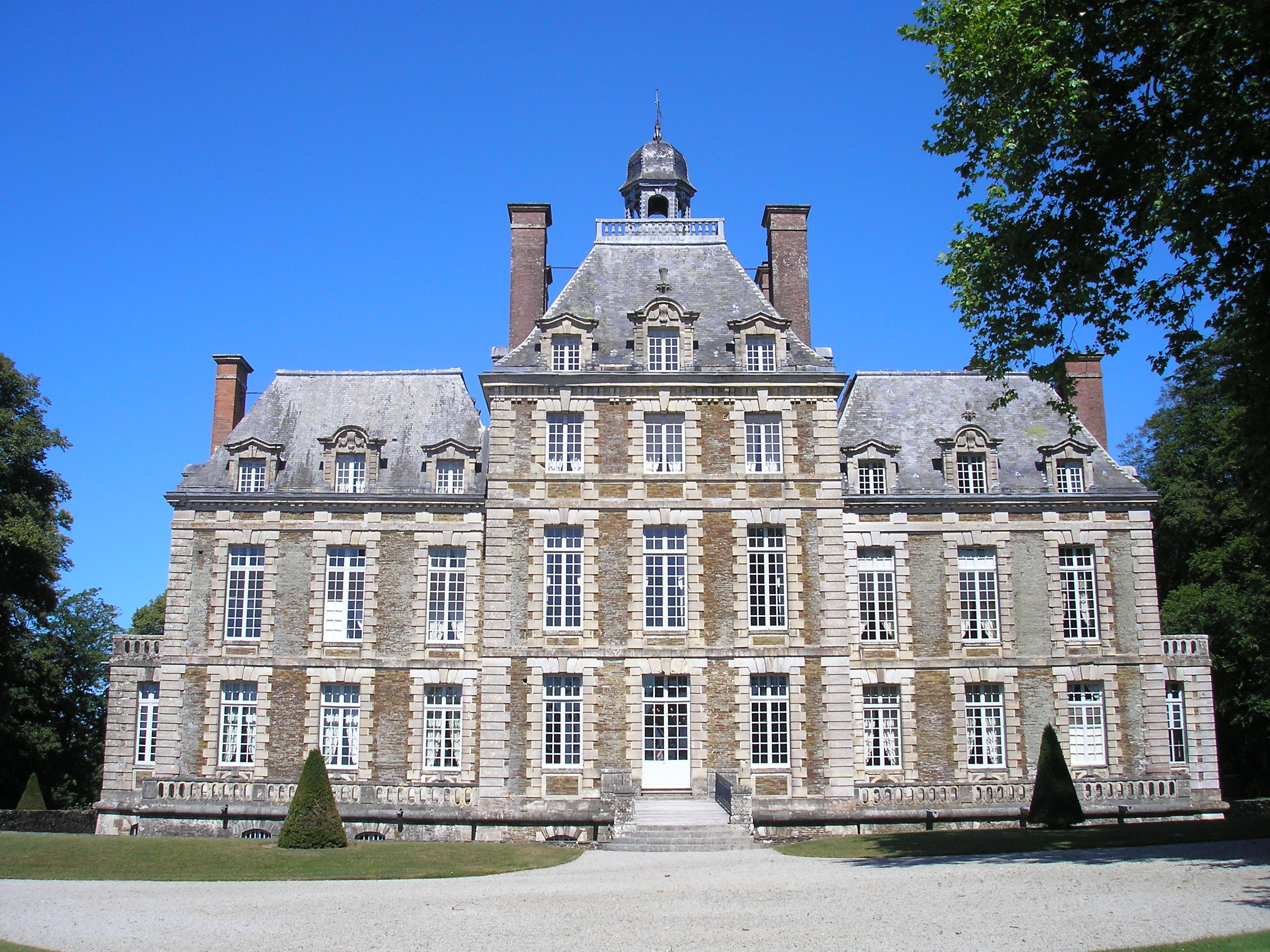
West side

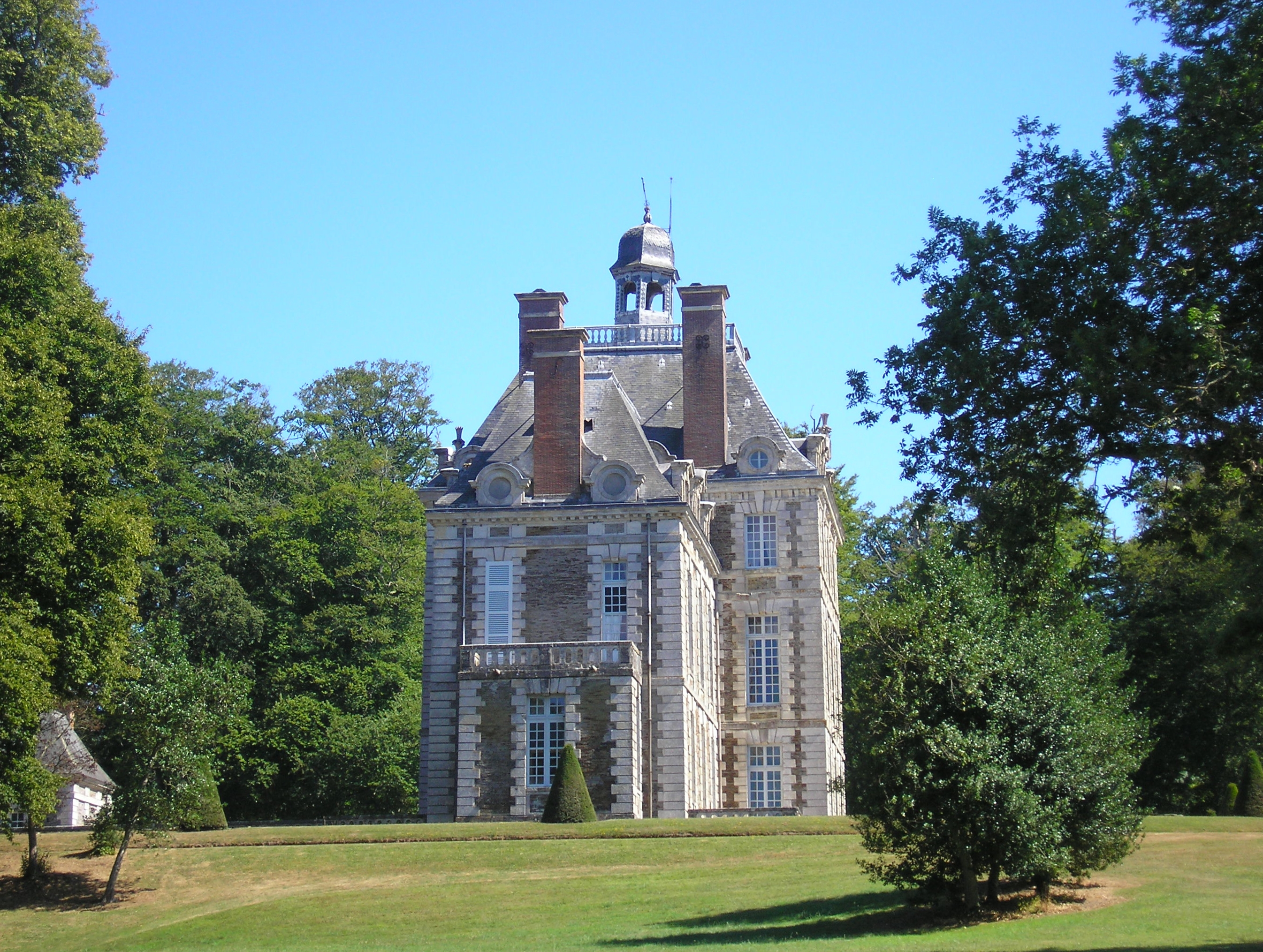
North side

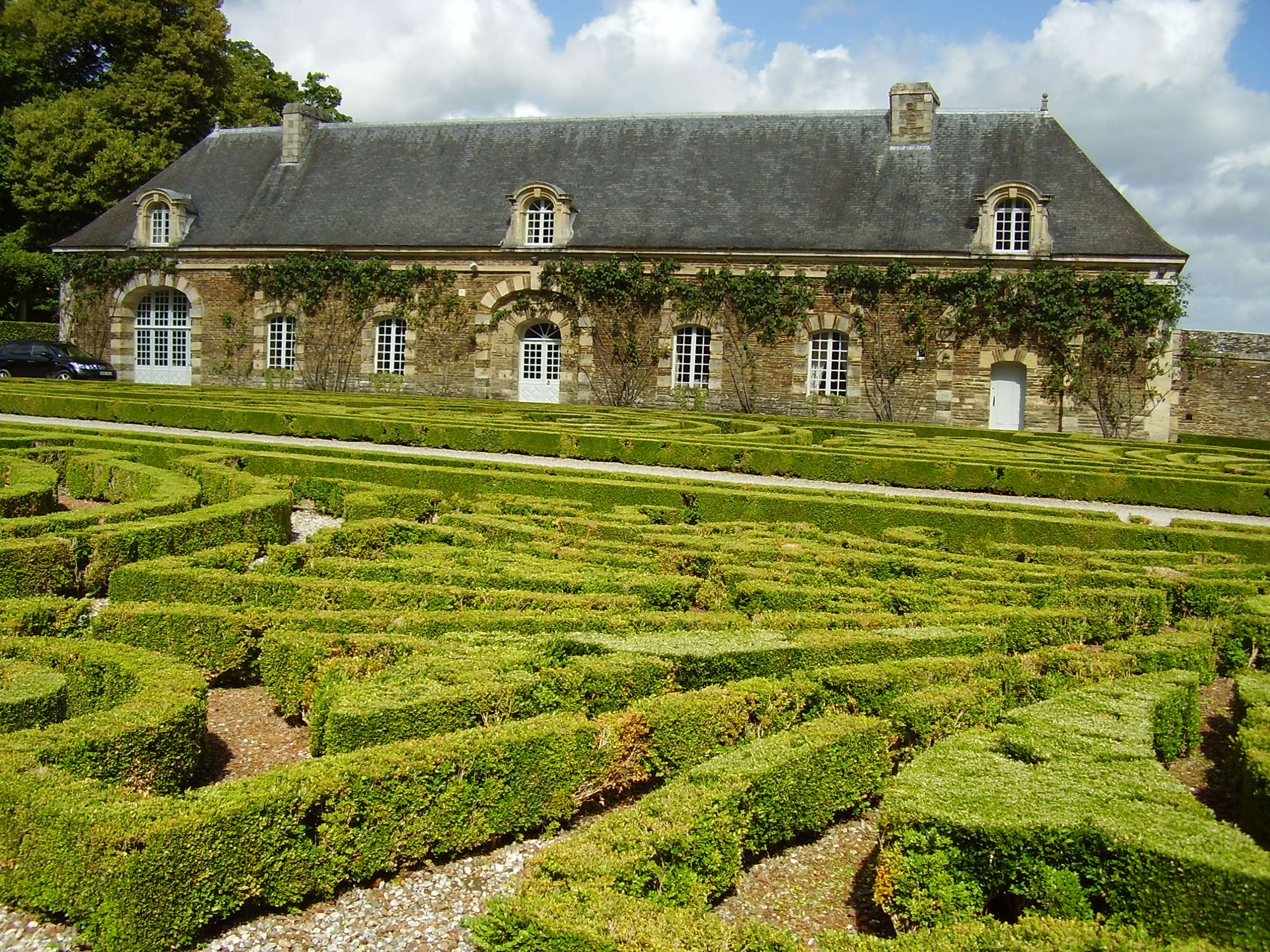
The commons and le jardin à la française

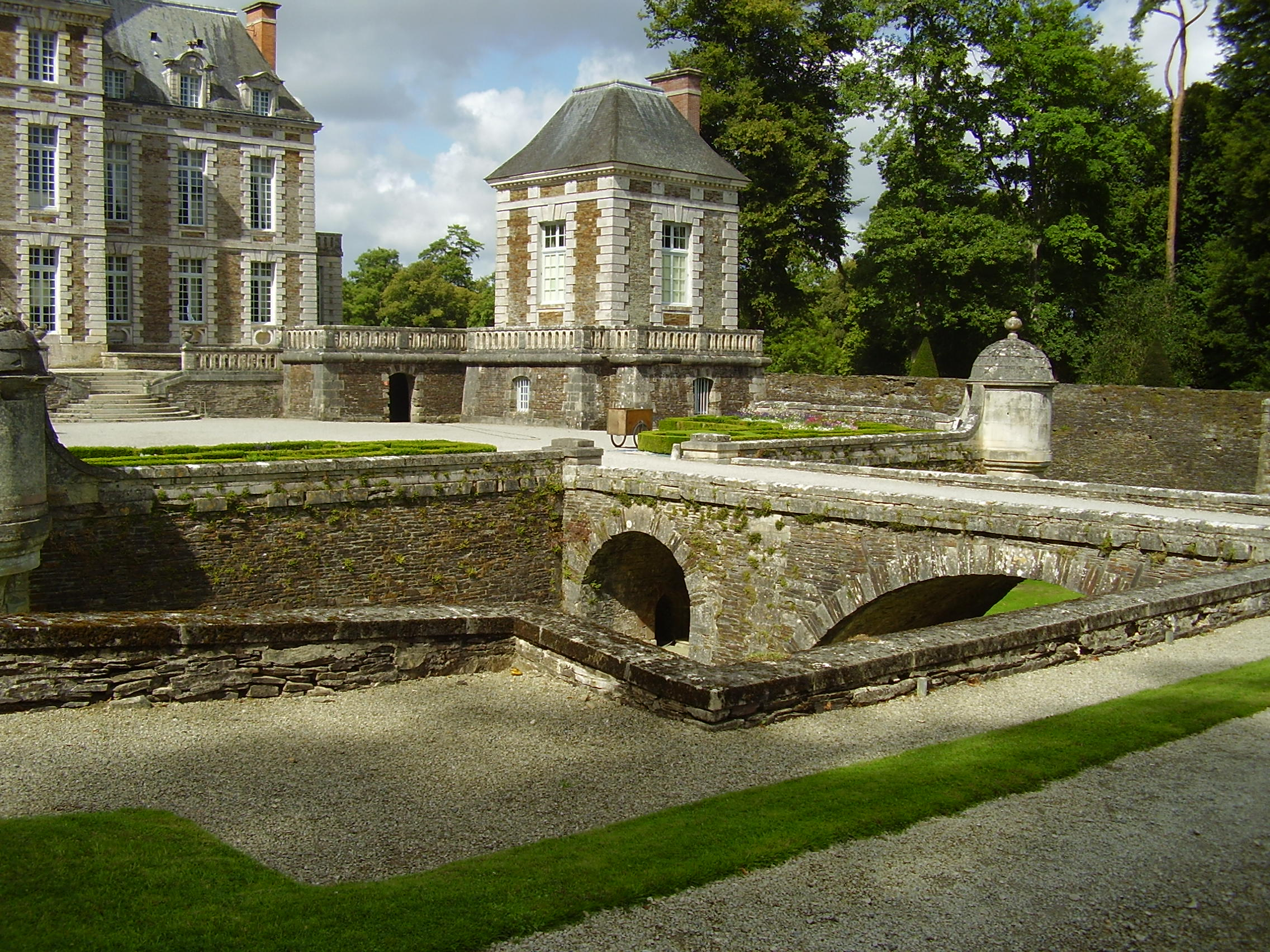
Moats

=== Occupants ===
The most well-known of the family is Francois-Timoléon (1644-1724), 4th and last son of Jean III de Choisy, travestied by his mother when young — until the age of 18 —, to court Anne of Austria and introduce him to the entourage of her younger son, Philippe of Orléans, of which he became a young gaming companion; as an abbot, he left famous Mémoires pour servir l'histoire de Louis XIV (1737); he was sent as an ambassador to the King of Siam in view of a conversion to Catholicism; in 1698, he sold Balleroy to the princesse d'Harcourt, born Françoise de Blacas.

In 1704, the Balleroy land became a marquisat, to the benefit of one of his cousins.

After the death of the two sons of la Cour de Balleroy during the French Revolution, their grandson only took possession in 1827 and remained the property of the inheritors till it was bought in 1970-1971 by American businessman and publisher of Forbes magazine Malcolm Forbes.

The current owner is American philanthropist Roy T. Eddleman.

Among the renowned inhabitants were Albert de Balleroy (Albert Félix Justin de la Cour de Balleroy), 19th century animal painter, friend of Édouard Manet and the groupe des Batignolles; for of his tableaux representing hunting scenes deck the castle living room. Empress Eugénie possessed one of his œuvres.

Marcel Proust visited the Château along with Paul Helleu, a visit that may have provided part of the inspiration for the "Château de Guermantes" in In Search of Lost Time.
