= A Peace Conference at the Quai d'Orsay =

Painting by William Orpen

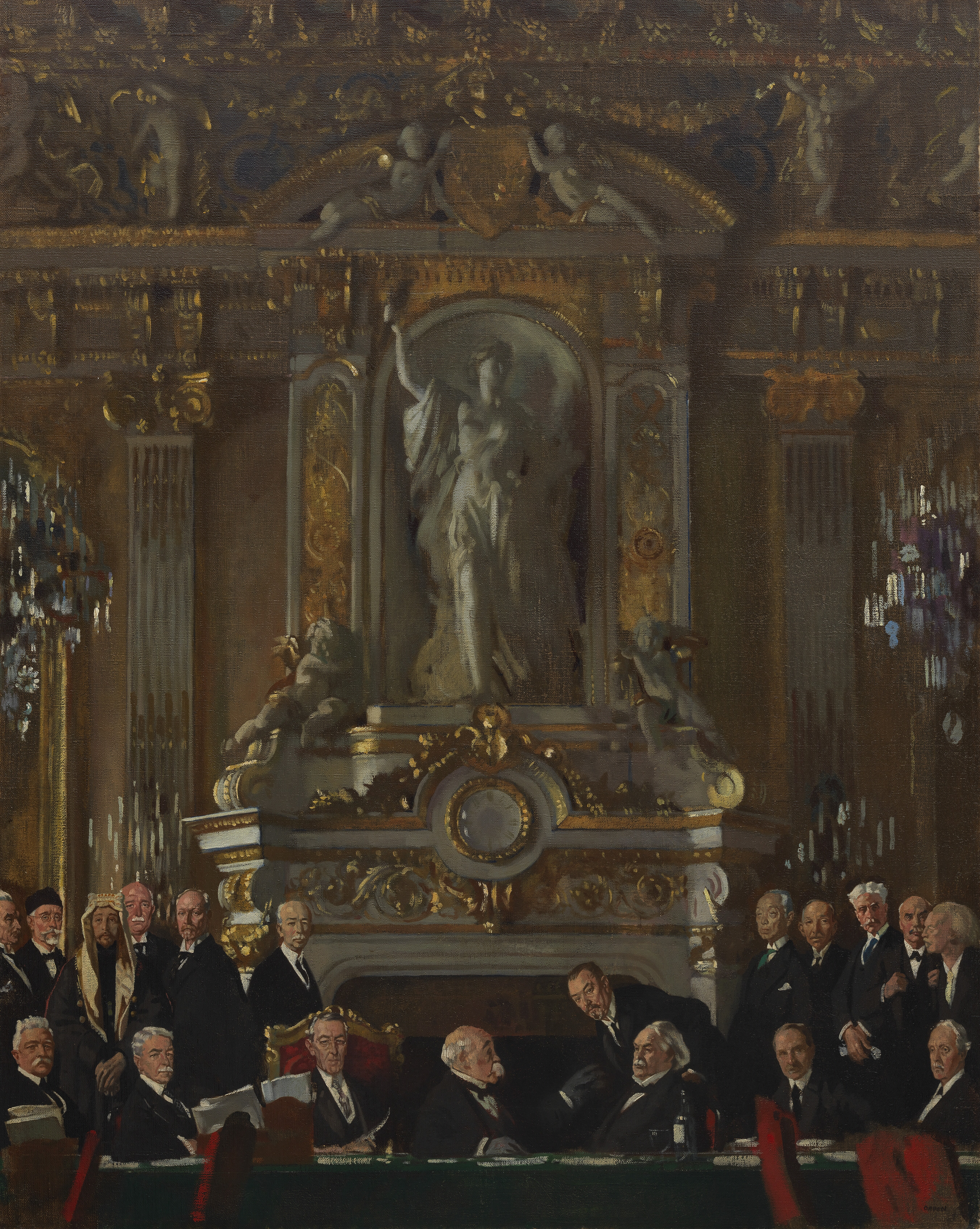
- Artist: Sir William Orpen
- Year: 1919
- Type: oil on canvas
- Dimensions: 102 cm × 104 cm (40 in × 41 in)
- Location: Imperial War Museum, London

A Peace Conference at the Quai d'Orsay is an oil-on-canvas painting by Irish artist William Orpen, completed in 1919. It was one of the paintings commissioned from Orpen to commemorate the Paris Peace Conference in 1919. The work is held by the Imperial War Museum, in London.

== Background ==
Orpen was one of the first people chosen as a war artist by the British Ministry of Information in 1917. Orpen was also official painter at the peace conference, and was commissioned to paint three canvases to record the roles of the politicians, diplomats and military at the conference.

The work is a group portrait depicting preliminary discussions of the "Council of Ten", comprising two delegates each from Britain, France, the United States, Italy and Japan. Conference delegates are depicted sitting and standing around a table in the Hall of Clocks at the French Ministry of Foreign Affairs at the Quai d'Orsay in Paris, where the conference was formally opened on 18 January 1919. The politicians and diplomats are overshadowed by the decorated room, with chandeliers, lavish gilded cornice, and a statue of Victory above an ornate fireplace. It measures 124.4 × 101.9 centimetres (49.0 × 40.1 in)

== Subjects ==
The people depicted are:

Seated, from left to right:

- Vittorio Emanuele Orlando, former Prime Minister of Italy
- Robert Lansing, US Secretary of State
- Woodrow Wilson, President of the United States, holding papers
- Georges Clemenceau, Prime Minister of France
- David Lloyd George, British Prime Minister
- Bonar Law, British Lord Privy Seal (and later Prime Minister)
- Arthur Balfour, British Secretary of State for Foreign Affairs and former British Prime Minister

Standing behind, from left to right:

- Paul Hymans, Belgian Minister for Foreign Affairs
- Eleftherios Venizelos, Prime Minister of Greece
- Emir Feisal, from Syria (later King of Syria and then King of Iraq)
- William Massey, Prime Minister of New Zealand
- General Jan Smuts, Prime Minister of South Africa
- Colonel Edward M. House behind Wilson
- General Louis Botha, former Prime Minister of South Africa
- Marquis Saionji Kinmochi, genrō and former Prime Minister of Japan
- Billy Hughes, Prime Minister of Australia
- Sir Robert Borden, Prime Minister of Canada
- George Nicoll Barnes, British Minister Without Portfolio representing Organised Labour
- Ignace Paderewski, Polish Minister of Foreign Affairs

== Other paintings ==
Orpen's other paintings of the conference depict the signing of the Versailles Peace Treaty in the Hall of Mirrors at the Palace of Versailles, and another showing a coffin lying in state in a marble hall covered by a Union Flag.

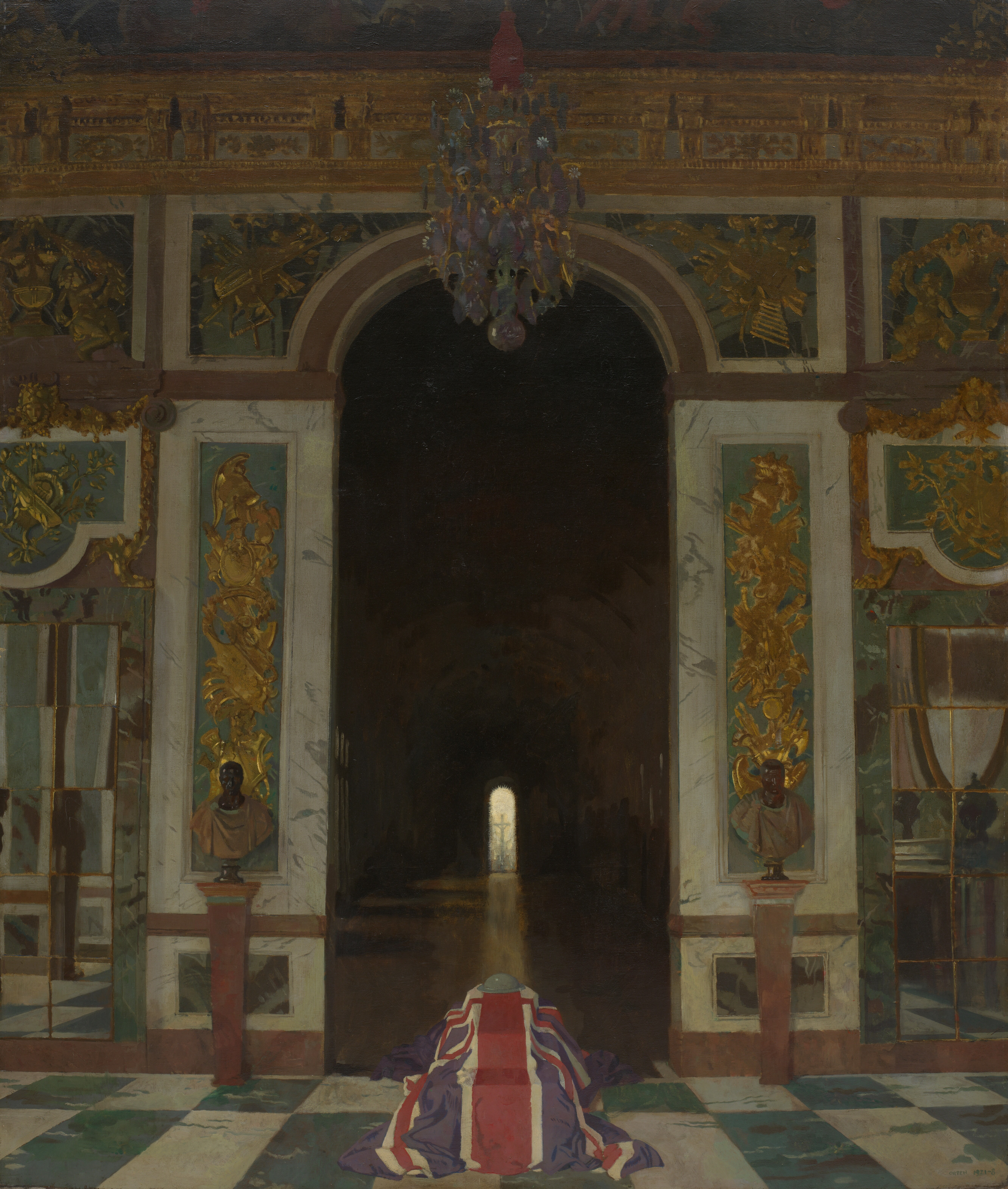
To the Unknown British Soldier in France

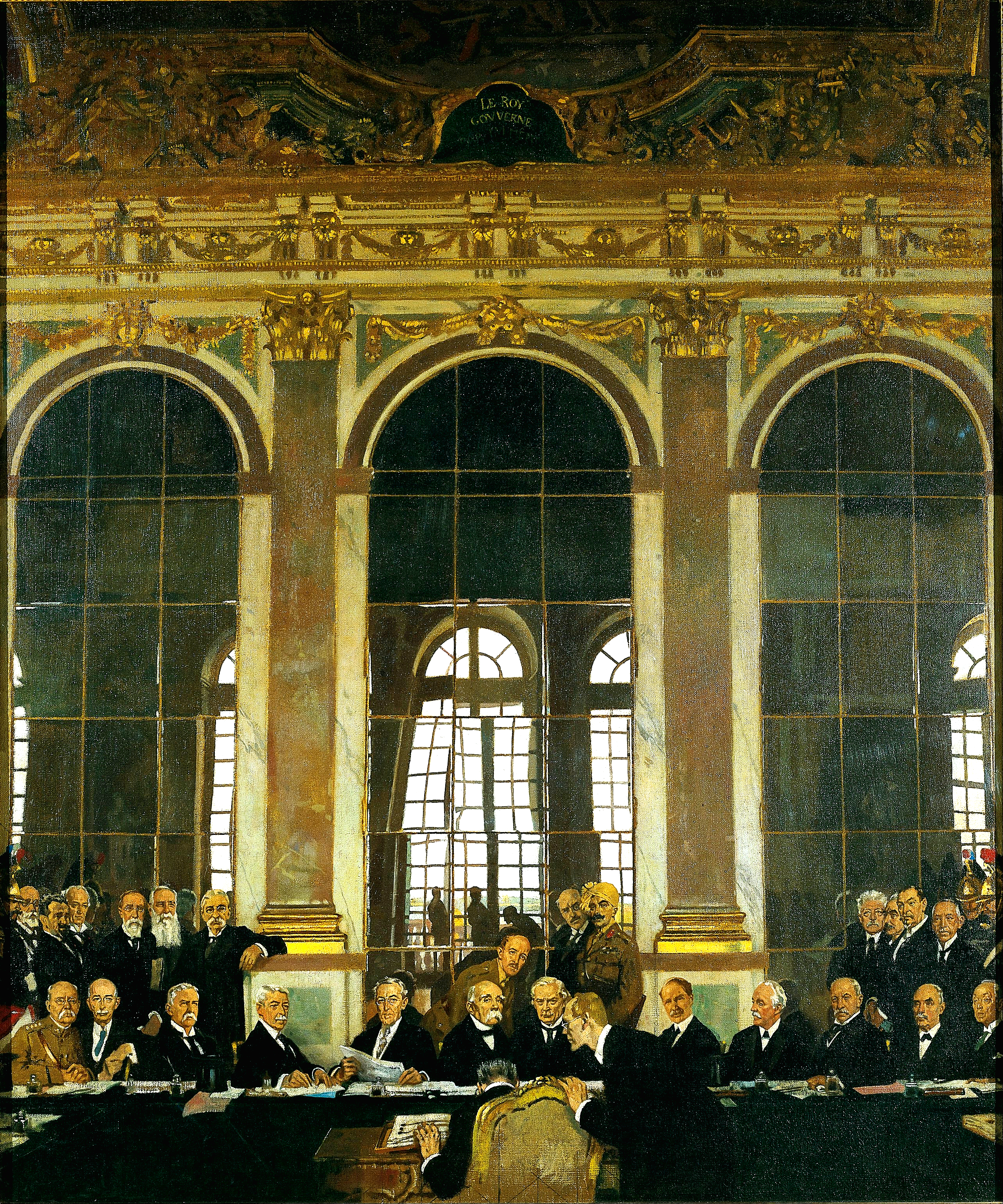
The Signing of Peace in the Hall of Mirrors, Versailles, 28th June 1919

== See also ==
- List of paintings by William Orpen
