= Homage to Delacroix =

1864 painting by Henri Fantin-Latour

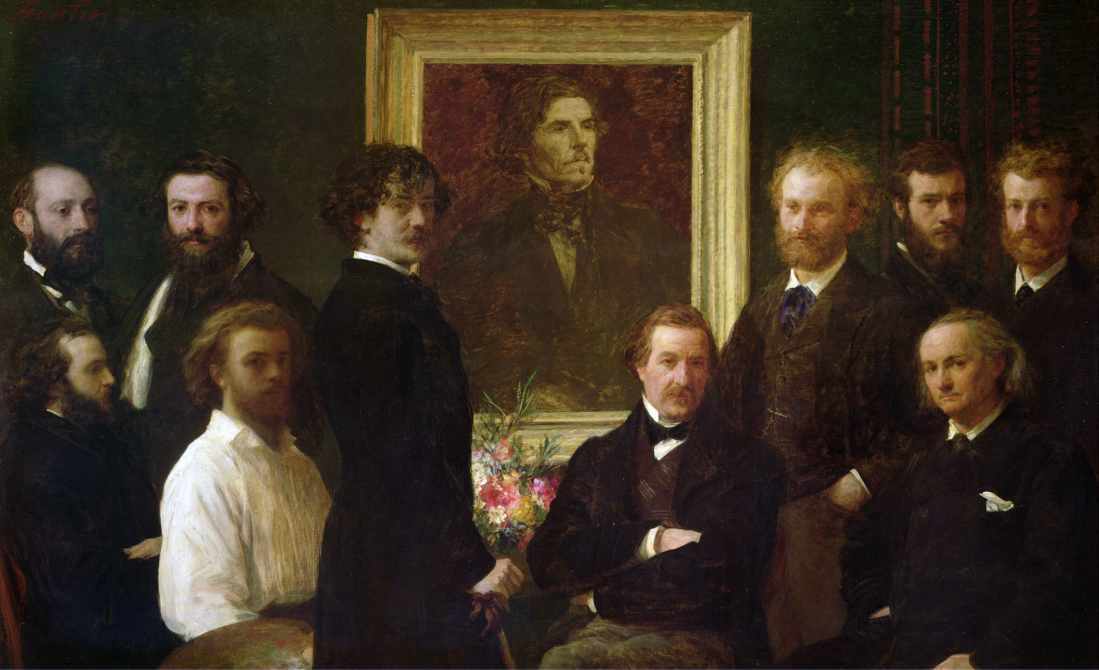
- Artist: Henri Fantin-Latour
- Year: 1864
- Medium: Oil on canvas
- Dimensions: 160 cm × 250 cm (63 in × 98 in)
- Location: Musee d'Orsay, Paris

Homage to Delacroix is an 1864 painting by Henri Fantin-Latour painted in homage to the French Romantic painter Eugène Delacroix who died the year before. The work features a group of painters and writers, all of whom went on to become notable themselves, gathered around a portrait of the late Delacroix. The painting was exhibited in the Paris Salon of 1864. Today the painting is part of the permanent collection of the Musee d'Orsay in Paris.

== History and description ==
This painting is one of the four and the first of this series that represent groups of artistic personalities of his time in the framework of manifesto paintings. It was on the occasion of Delacroix's funeral that Fantin-Latour, shocked by the thinness of the procession where he had followed in the company of Charles Baudelaire and Édouard Manet, decided to paint a public tribute in which he would represent a set of ten personalities from the French arts and letters world showing their admiration, gathered in front of a portrait of the Romantic master who had died the previous year.

Besides Delacroix, pictured in the work are Louis Cordier, Louis Edmond Duranty, Alphonse Legros, Henri Fantin-Latour, James Abbott McNeill Whistler, Champfleury, Édouard Manet, Félix Bracquemond, Charles Baudelaire, and Albert de Balleroy. Whistler and Manet stand to the left and right, respectively, of the portrait of Delacroix, which was executed from a photograph taken approximately a decade earlier.

== Critical reception ==
The work was shown at the Paris Salon of 1864 where it obtained not very positive reviews from critics who reproach it for his static and photographic structure and the dark tones. Despite this, the painting was appreciated in the artistic environment and Fantin-Latour would successfully create other collective portraits of painters and writers of his circle in the following years, like A Studio at Les Batignolles (1870).

== See also ==
- Homage to Manet, a 1909 painting by William Orpen
