= To the Unknown British Soldier in France =

Painting by William Orpen

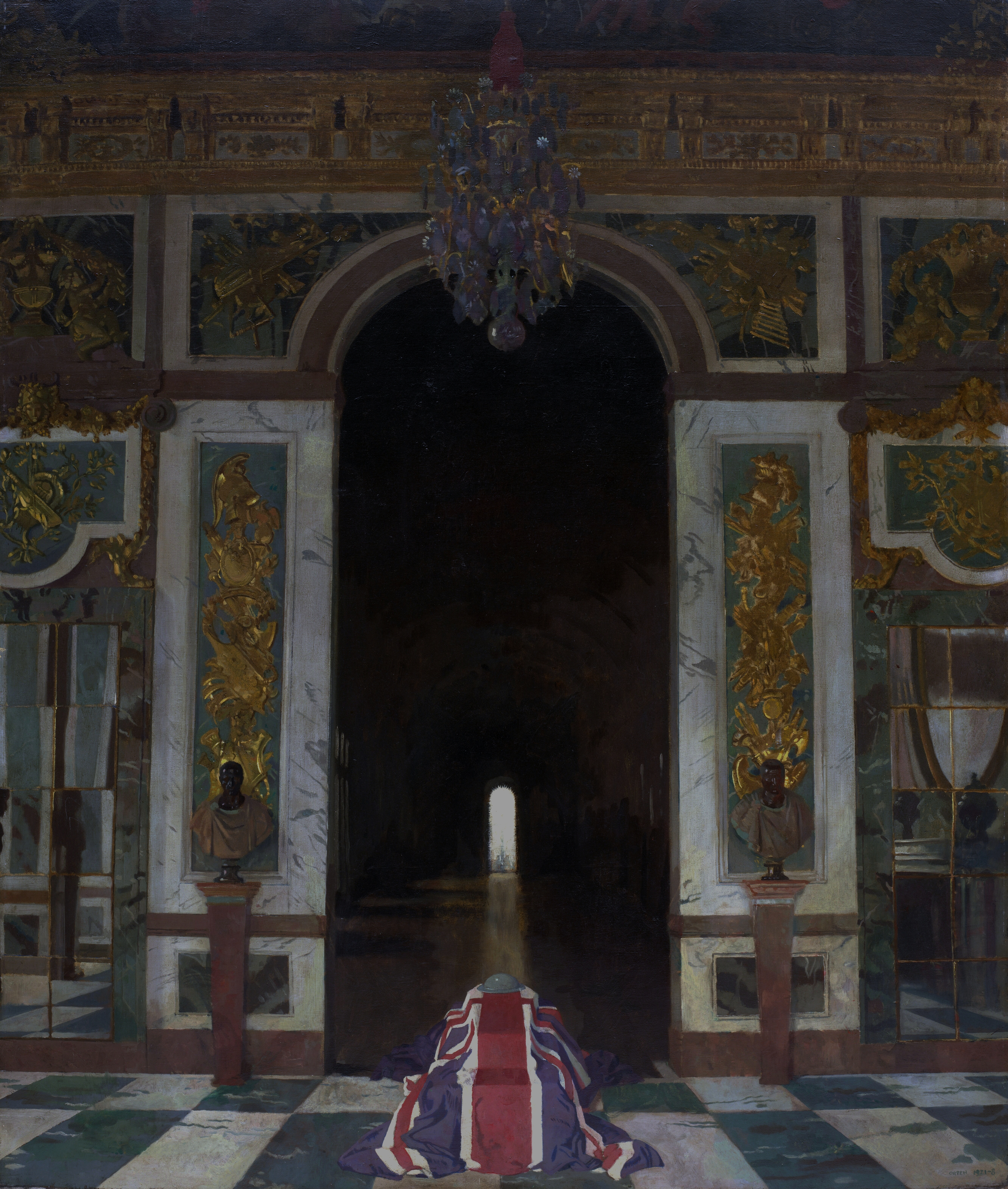
- Artist: Sir William Orpen
- Year: 1927
- Type: oil painting
- Dimensions: 154 cm × 129 cm (60.7 in × 50.7 in)
- Location: Imperial War Museum, London

To the Unknown British Soldier in France is an oil-on-canvas painting by Irish artist Sir William Orpen, exhibited in one state in 1923 and then modified in 1927. It was one of three paintings commissioned from Orpen to commemorate the Peace Conference at Versailles in 1919. The work is held by the Imperial War Museum in London.

== Background ==
Orpen was one of the first people chosen as a war artist by the British Ministry of Information in 1917. Orpen was also official painter at the Versailles peace conference, and was commissioned to paint three canvases to record the roles of the politicians, diplomats and military at the conference, for a fee of £6,000. The other two works, A Peace Conference at the Quai d'Orsay and The Signing of Peace in the Hall of Mirrors, Versailles, 28th June 1919, are both group portraits depicting the participants at the conference.

Orpen was deeply affected by the suffering he witnessed in France during the war, and grew to dislike the politicians at the conference. To the Unknown British Soldier in France was originally intended to include a group of soldiers and statesmen in the Hall of Peace at the Palace of Versailles, including Admirals Beatty and Sturdee; Field Marshals Allenby, French, Haig and Plumer; Generals Cowans, Currie and Rawlinson; Lieutenant Arthur Rhys-Davids; David Lloyd George; Georges Clemenceau, and Marshals Pétain and Foch. Orpen had completed perhaps 30 portraits before he changed his mind and painted out the faces. Over time, the faces have now become faintly visible again under the surface of the modified work.

== Subject ==
The painting measures 154.2 × 128.9 centimetres (60.7 × 50.7 in). It shows a coffin holding the remains of an unknown soldier, lying in state in a marble hall, covered by a Union Flag and topped by a British helmet, with a chandelier hanging above. A dark hallway opens up through an arched opening behind the coffin, and light is visible falling from another arched opening in the distance, with the faint outline of a cross. The coffin is located in the Hall of Peace at the Palace of Versailles, with the Hall of Mirrors behind leading to the Hall of War.

In place of the group portrait, in the original version of the revised painting, Orpen decided to accompany the coffin with an honour guard of two emaciated soldiers, bearing guns but clad only in loin-cloths of tattered blankets. Above, two cherubs held a floral garland that reached down to the floor.

The completed work was first exhibited at the Royal Academy's Summer Exhibition in 1923. It was one of the more popular exhibits with the public, but it was attacked as in poor taste by critics. The Imperial War Museum declined to take the work on the grounds that it did not meet the terms of the commission.

Orpen later painted out the soldiers and the cherubs with their flowers, and then donated the revised painting to the Imperial War Museum in 1928 as a tribute to the late Field Marshal Haig.

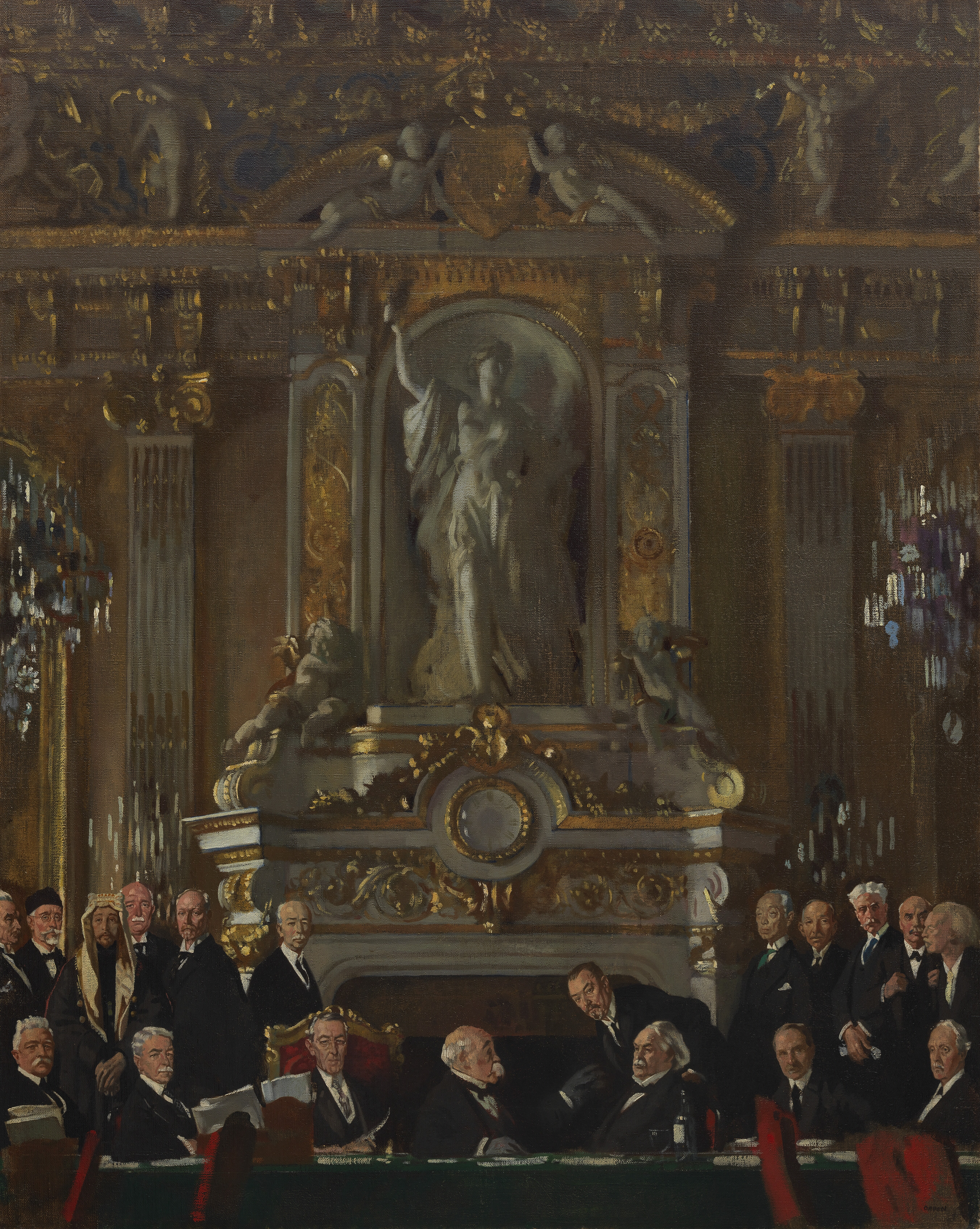
A Peace Conference at the Quai d'Orsay

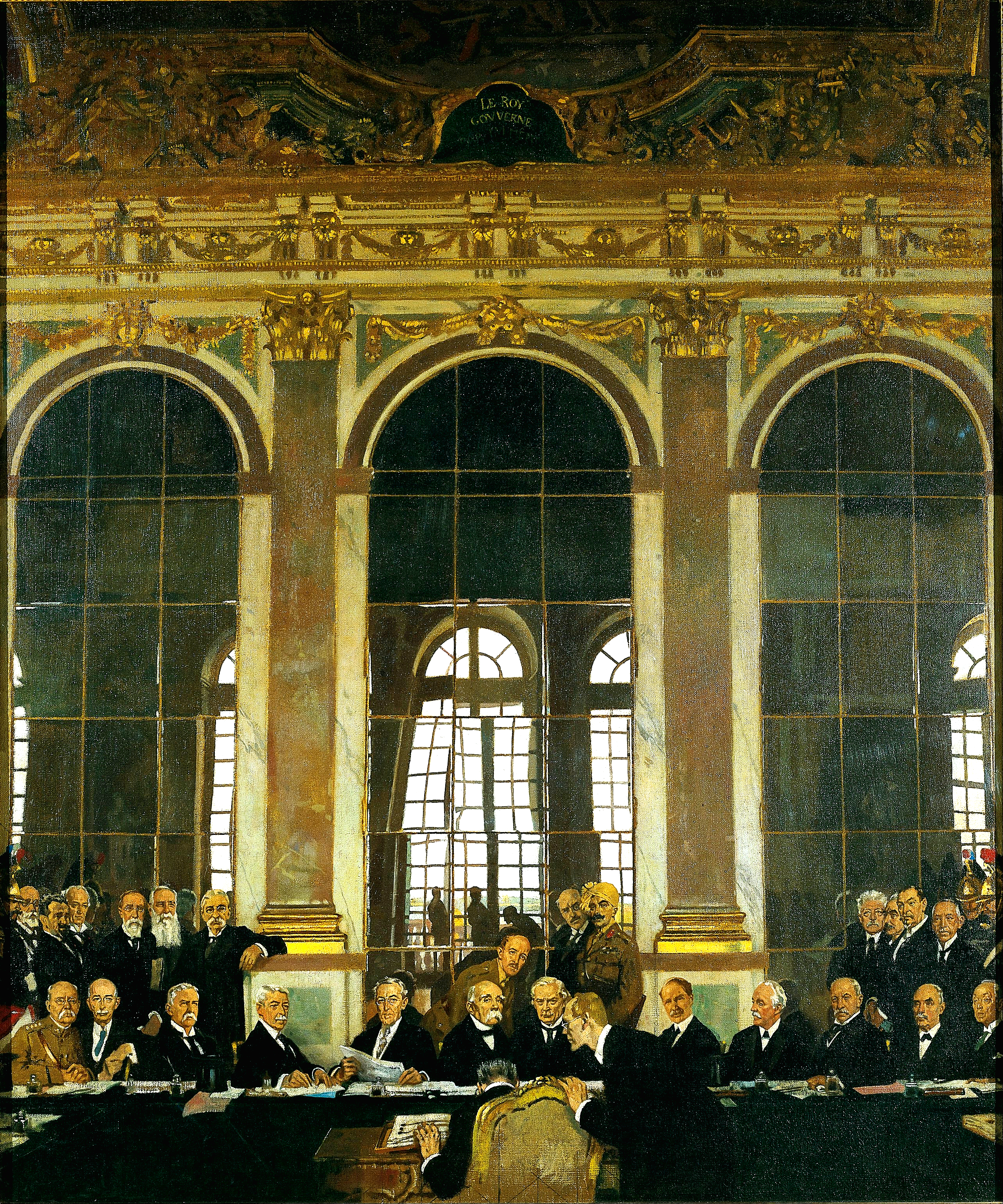
The Signing of Peace in the Hall of Mirrors, Versailles, 28th June 1919

== See also ==
- List of paintings by William Orpen
