= Zonnebeke (painting) =

Painting by William Orpen

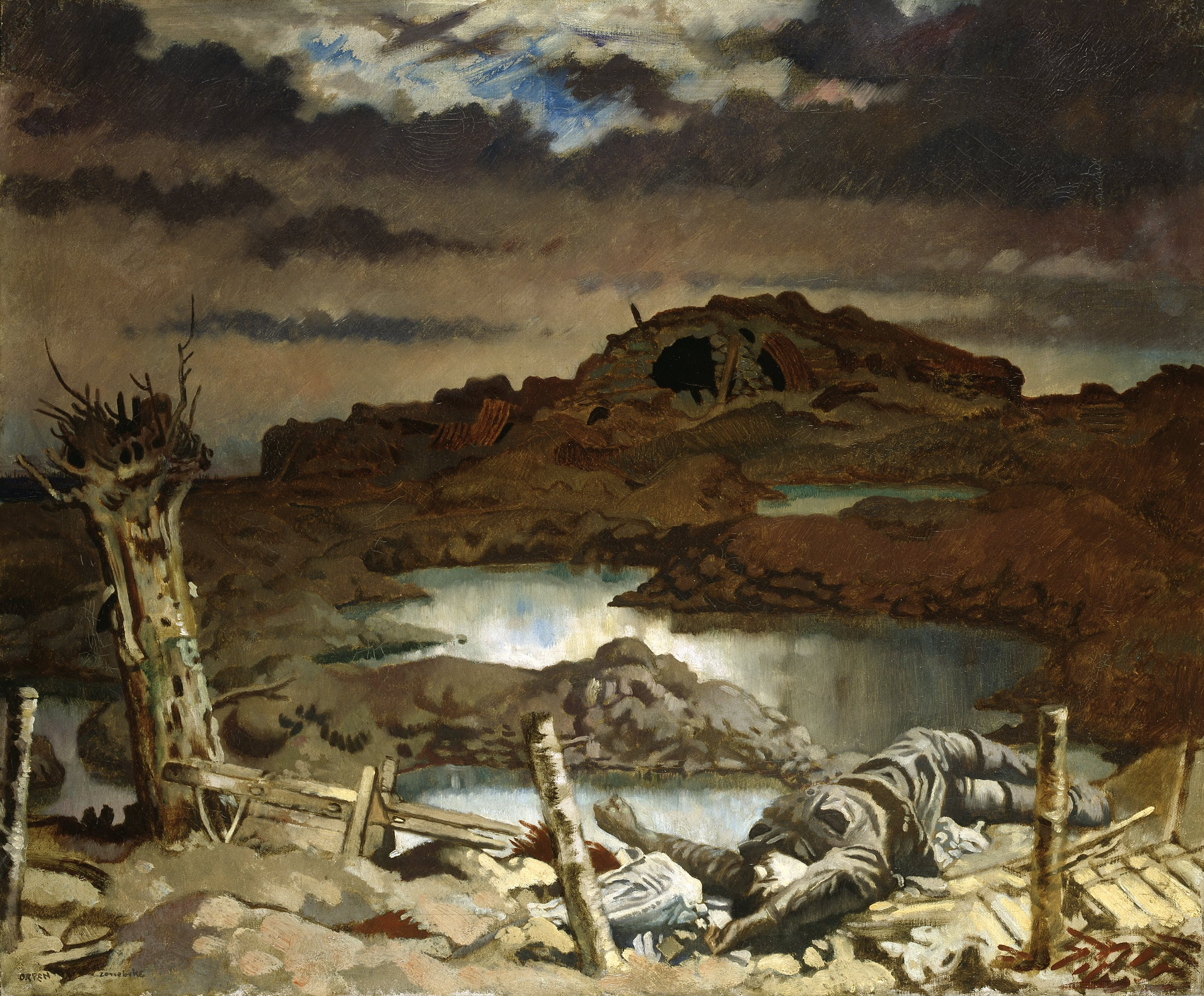
- Artist: Sir William Orpen
- Year: 1918
- Type: oil painting
- Dimensions: 63.5 cm × 76.2 cm (25.0 in × 30.0 in)
- Location: Tate; London

Zonnebeke is an oil-on-canvas painting created in 1918 by the Irish artist William Orpen. It was one of the series of paintings that he made when he was British official war artist in World War I. It belongs to the collection of the Tate, in London.

== Description ==
The painting follows the same pattern of brutal realism of those he had created the previous year, while in France, when he witnessed the Battle of the Somme. In 1918, he was doing more allegorical paintings on the subject of the war, but he still made some realistic works.

This painting takes his name from the municipality of Zonnebeke, in Flanders, Belgium, which had been completely destroyed as part of the Passchendaele campaign, from June to November 1917. The offensive took a massive toil of British and German lives, while the Allies had just advanced five miles at the end of the campaign. The painting depicts the desolate landscape of a battlefield, with grey skies, the remains of the trenches filled with water, and a corpse lying at the right, while a heavily damaged tree is at the left.

Orpen wrote on his memoirs of the war, An Onlooker in France 1917–1919 (1921), that a British officer described the scenery of the battle in these words: "‘I remember an officer saying to me, Paint the Somme? I could do it from memory – just a flat horizon line and mud-holes and water, and the stumps of a few battered trees.’ but one could not paint the smell.". Orpen also described what he had seen vividly, as reflected in this work: "A hand lying on the duckboards, a Bosche and a Highlander locked in a deadly embrace at the edge of Highwood; the 'Cough-Drop' with the stench coming from its watery bottom; the shell-holes with the shapes of bodies faintly showing through the putrid water – all these things made one think terribly of what human beings had been through."

== See also ==
- List of paintings by William Orpen
