= List of paintings by William Orpen =

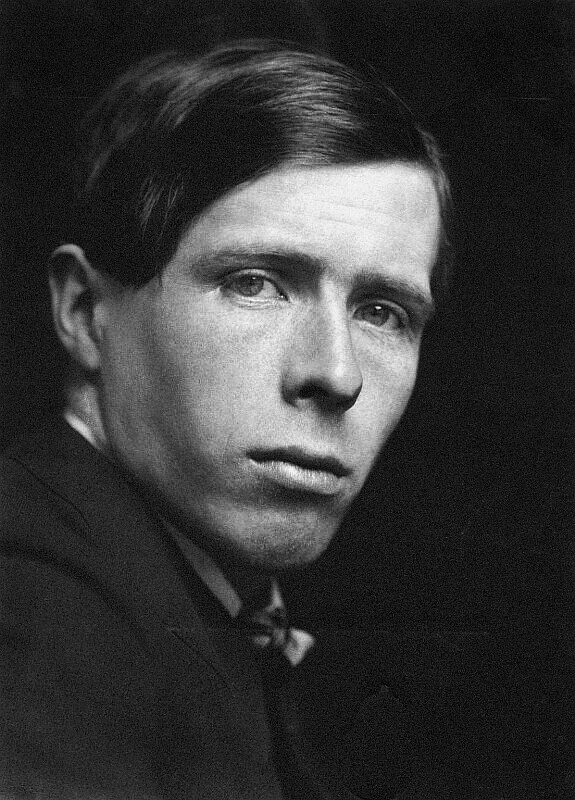
William Orpen – 1903 portrait by George Charles Beresford

William Orpen was a highly successful portrait painter with the New English Art Club; painting numerous members of Edwardian high society. Following the outbreak of World War I, and the death of his friend, the art collector Hugh Lane who died aboard the RMS Lusitania, he enlisted with the British Government as an official war artist on the Western Front. His works, which ranged from portraits of military officials to depictions of shell-shock, and war-torn landscapes, were received with great acclaim. As a result, he was selected to paint the Paris Peace Conference overseeing the end of the conflict.

== Paintings ==
Image	Title	Date	Technique	Dimensions	Current location
	Male Figure Standing	1899	oil on canvas	91.5 cm x 61 cm	UCL Art Museum
	Portrait of a Girl Wearing a Green Dress	1899	oil on canvas	91.4 cm x 71.1 cm	UCL Art Museum
	Portrait of Grace Orpen (Grace by Candlelight)	c. 1899-1900	oil on canvas	92.5 cm x 61 cm	Private Collection
	The Artist as a Young Man	c. 1899-1900	oil on canvas	108 cm x 53.3 cm	Glasgow Museums
	Augustus John	c. 1899-1900	oil on canvas	99.1 cm x 94 cm	National Portrait Gallery, London
	Grace reading at Howth Bay	c. 1900	oil on canvas	45.8 cm x 50.8 cm	Private collection
	Portrait of Herbert Barnard John Everett	c. 1900	oil on canvas	96.5 cm x 91.5 cm	Royal Museums Greenwich.
	James Staats Forbes (1823–1904)	1900	oil on canvas	94.1 cm x 85.1 cm	Manchester Art Gallery
	The English nude	1900	oil on canvas	92 cm x 72 cm	Mildura Arts Centre
	The Mirror	1900	oil on canvas	50.8 cm x 40.6 cm	Tate
	Lady on a Couch (Elizabeth Ann Ferrier, 1844–1917)	1900	oil on canvas	80 cm x 89 cm	Leicester Museum & Art Gallery
	The Normandy Cider Press	1900	oil on canvas	53.5 cm x 76 cm	Private Collection
	Soldiers at Cany	1900	oil on canvas	51 cm x 60.5 cm	Government Art Collection
	Interior	c. 1901	oil on canvas	91.5 cm x 75 cm	Private Collection
	A Mere Fracture	1901	oil on canvas	Unknown	Private Collection
	The Three Blind Men (Arabian Nights)	1901	chalk with wash over pencil	34 cm x 49 cm	Private Collection
	Noureddin Ali leaving Cairo	1901	pencil, chalk, watercolor and bodycolor	38 cm x 47 cm	Private Collection
	Mrs. Charles Hughes	1901	oil on canvas	59.9 cm x 49.9 cm	Kirklees Museums and Galleries
	The Window Seat, by William Orpen, 1901	1901	oil on canvas	76 cm x 46 cm	Private Collection
	The Swinton Family	1902	oil on canvas	112 cm x 150 cm	Private Collection
	The Chess Players	1902	oil on canvas	92 cm x 71 cm	Ashmolean Museum
	Portrait of Clara Hughes	1902	oil on canvas	61 cm x 51 cm	Unknown
	The Rebel	1902	oil on canvas	52 cm x 80 cm	Private Collection
	George Charles Beresford	1903	oil on canvas	40.6 cm x 30.1 cm	National Portrait Gallery, London
	The Red Scarf	1903	oil on canvas	91.4 cm x 71.1 cm	Leeds Museums and Galleries
	Charles John Wertheimer (1842–1911)	1904	oil on canvas	61 cm x 46 cm	Beecroft Art Gallery
	Portrait of Augusta Gregory (1852-1932), Dramatist and Folklorist	c. 1904	oil on canvas	61 cm x 46 cm	National Gallery of Ireland
	Portrait of Mary, Lady Gerard in a Green Dress	1904	oil on canvas	99 cm x 67 cm	Private collection
	Improvisation on a Barrel Organ	1904	oil on canvas	99.7 cm x 153 cm	Walker Art Gallery
	Lottie of Paradise Walk	1905	oil on canvas	91.4 cm x 76.2 cm	Leeds Art Gallery
	The Beggar Girl	1905	oil on canvas	76.2 cm x 55.8 cm	Private Collection
	The Wash House	1905	oil on canvas	91 cm x 73 cm	National Gallery of Ireland
	Resting	1905	oil on canvas	76.2 cm x 55.8 cm	Ulster Museum
	Job	1905	oil on canvas	55.9 cm x 68.5 cm	Private Collection
	The Flycatcher	1905	oil on canvas	66 cm x 53.3 cm	private collection
	The Spanish Woman	1905	oil on canvas	91.4 cm x 71.1 cm	Leeds Art Gallery
	The Costermonger	1905	oil on canvas	61.9 cm x 51.8 cm	Worcester Museum
	St Patrick	1905	oil on canvas	100 cm x 77.5 cm	Potteries Museum & Art Gallery
	Anita	1905	oil on canvas	Unknown	Tate
	A Saint of the Poor	1905	oil on canvas	68.6 cm x 54.5 cm	Glasgow Museums Resource Centre
	The Saint of Poverty	1905	oil on canvas	67 cm x 53 cm	Private Collection
	Lottie of Paradise Walk	1905	oil on canvas	38 cm x 55 cm	Private Collection
	Sir Charles Algernon Parsons (1854–1931)	c. 1905-1910	oil on canvas	127.4 cm x 102.2 cm	Laing Art Gallery
	Nude Study	1906	oil on canvas	56.6 cm x 81.3 cm	Leeds Art Gallery
	An Eastern Gown	1906	oil on canvas	89 cm x 73.5 cm	Atkinson Art Gallery and Library
	Miss Annie Isobel 'Lillo' Lumb	1906	oil on canvas	88 cm x 64 cm	Huddersfield Art Gallery
	Mrs. St. George	1906	oil on canvas	216 cm x 119.5 cm	Private Collection
	Portrait of Michael Davitt	1906	oil on canvas	24 cm x 24.5 cm	Private Collection
	The Performing Bears	1907	oil on canvas	76.2 cm x 63.5 cm	Private Collection
	Joseph Bickersteth Mayor (1828–1916), Deacon of Ely	c. 1907	oil on canvas	100 cm x 78.8 cm	Cambridge University
	Lady Orpen	1907	oil on canvas	97.2 cm x 86.4 cm	Tate
	Portrait of Grace	1907	oil on canvas	90 cm x 70 cm	Mildura Arts Centre
	The Window: Night	c. 1907	oil on canvas	107 cm x 79 cm	Private Collection
	Lottie and the Baby	1907	oil on canvas	61 cm x 51 cm	Walker Art Gallery
	Night	1907	oil on canvas	91.4 cm x 71.1 cm	Private Collection
	Night (no.2)	1907	oil on canvas	76.5 cm x 64 cm	National Gallery of Victoria
	Miss Anne Harmsworth in an Interior	1907	oil on canvas	91.5 cm x 71 cm	Private Collection
	Grace Gifford	c. 1907	oil on canvas	Unknown	Unknown
	A Bloomsbury Family	1907	oil on canvas	127.6 cm x 102.2 cm	National Gallery of Scotland
	The Vere Foster Family	1907	oil on canvas	198 cm x 198 cm	National Gallery of Ireland
	The Bar in the Hall-by-the-sea, Margate	c. 1907-1908	oil on canvas	91.5 cm x 71 cm	Private Collection
	Portrait of the Artist	1908	oil on canvas	92.8 cm x 72.1 cm	Laing Art Gallery
	John Shawe-Taylor	1908	oil on canvas	Unknown	Unknown
	Charles Buller Heberden, Principal (1889–1920), Vice-Chancellor (1910–1913)	1908	oil on canvas	110 cm x 100 cm	University of Oxford
	Still Life with Chinese Porcelain Figure	1908	oil on canvas	76 cm x 63.5 cm	Private collection
	The Selecting Jury of the New English Art Club, 1909	1909	oil on canvas	69.9 cm x 90.2 cm	National Portrait Gallery, London
	In the Dublin Mountains	1909	oil on canvas	115 cm x 97.5 cm	Gallery Oldham
	Bridgit - a picture of Miss Elvery (Beatrice Elvery)	1909	oil on canvas	43.2 cm x 33.2 cm	Unknown
	Homage to Manet	1909	oil on canvas	162.9 cm x 130 cm	Manchester Art Gallery
	The Dead Ptarmigan (a Self-Portrait)	1909	oil on canvas	100 cm x 91 cm	National Gallery of Ireland
	Rocky Coast Scene at Howth	1909	oil on canvas	85 cm x 90 cm	Mildura Arts Centre
	The Knacker's Yard	1909	oil on canvas	127 cm x 103 cm	National Gallery of Ireland
	Midday on the Beach	1910	oil on canvas	unknown	private collection
	Looking at the Sea	1910	oil on canvas	61 cm x 50 cm	National Gallery of Ireland
	William Orpen	c. 1910	oil on canvas	72.7 cm x 49.8 cm	National Portrait Gallery, London
	Regent Street	c. 1910	oil on canvas	49.5 cm x 60 cm	Government Art Collection
	Behind the Scenes	1910	oil on canvas	92 cm x 72 cm	Gallery Oldham
	Francis Hay Rawlins (1850–1920)	1910	oil on canvas	Unknown	Eton College
	Myself and Cupid	1910	oil on canvas	102 cm x 86.5 cm	Private Collection
	The Studio	1910	oil on canvas	96.5 cm x 80 cm	Leeds Art Gallery
	Self-Portrait	1910	oil on canvas	101.9 cm x 84.1 cm	Metropolitan Museum of Art
	Portrait of Miss Violette Lilian Rosemary Harmsworth, in a Landscape	1910	oil on canvas	91.5 cm x 71 cm	Private Collection
	Portrait of the Artist's Parents	c. 1911	oil on canvas	169 cm x 138 cm	National Gallery of Ireland
	Portrait of Claude Bishop	1911	oil on canvas	107.3 cm x 97.8 cm	Private Collection
	Study for a Portrait of Leonard Stokes	1911	oil on canvas	112 cm x 101.8 cm	Royal Academy of Arts
	Henry Montagu Butler (1833–1918), Master (1886–1918), Classical Scholar	1911	oil on canvas	102 cm x 84 cm	University of Cambridge
	Ernest Egbert Blyth (1857–1934), Last Mayor & First Lord Mayor of Norwich (1910)	1911	oil on canvas	211 cm x 137.4 cm	Norwich Castle
	Oliver St. John Gogarty	1911	oil on canvas	16.5 cm x 21.7 cm	Royal College of Surgeons
	Tempest Anderson	c. 1912	oil on canvas	50 cm x 40 cm	Yorkshire Museum
	Edward Stanley (1865–1948), 17th Earl of Derby as Lord Mayor of Liverpool	1912	oil on canvas	117.5 cm x 94.5 cm	Walker Art Gallery
	Arthur Schuster	1912	oil on canvas	113 cm x 95.3 cm	The Royal Society
	Leonard A. Scott Stokes (1858–1925), PRIBA, RGM	1912	oil on canvas	130 cm x 93.5 cm	Royal Institute of British Architects
	Afternoon Sleep	1912	oil on canvas	100 cm x 95 cm	McLean Museum and Art Gallery
	The angler	1912	oil on canvas	91.4 cm x 86.4 cm	Tate
	View from Howeth	1912	oil on board	49 cm x 61 cm	Private Collection
	Portrait of Gardenia St. George with riding crop	1912	oil on canvas	109 cm x 81 cm	Private Collection
	The Café Royal, London	1912	oil on canvas	137.5 cm x 113.5 cm	Musée d'Orsay
	Summer Afternoon (Artist in his Studio with a Model)	c. 1913	oil on canvas	96.5 cm x 86.4 cm	Boston Museum of Fine Arts
	Sir Charles Thomas-Stanford	1913	oil on canvas	114 cm x 90 cm	Brighton & Hove Museums
	Noll; Son of Oliver St. John Gogarty	1913	oil on canvas	127 cm x 101 cm	Private Collection
	Otto Beit in his study at Belgrave Square	1913	oil on canvas	81.5 cm x 76.3 cm	Johannesburg Art Gallery
	Self-Portrait	1913	oil on canvas	122.9 cm x 89.9 cm	Saint Louis Art Museum
	Sowing new seed	1913	oil on canvas	137 cm x 137 cm	The National Gallery of Australia
	The Yacht Race (Sighting the Boat)	1913	pencil and watercolor on paper	53.5 cm x 76.5 cm	Private Collection
	In the cliffs, Dublin bay, in the morning	1914	oil on canvas	96.5 cm x 91.5 cm	Private Collection
	Mrs. Evelyn St George	1914	oil on canvas	157 cm x 94.5 cm	Private Collection
	Alderman Cedric Chivers (1854–1929)	1914	oil on canvas	71 cm x 57 cm	Victoria Art Gallery
	Lily Carstairs	1914	oil on canvas	Unknown	Private Collection
	Mrs. Charles S. Carstairs	1914	oil on canvas	99.7 cm x 87 cm	National Gallery of Art
	A Canadian Airman	1914-1919	oil on canvas	91.3 cm x 76 cm	Canadian War Museum
	Geoffrey, Fourth Marquis of Headfort	1915	oil on canvas	81.5 cm x 66 cm	Unknown
	Portrait of Lady Evelyn Herbert	1915	oil on canvas	76.2 cm x 63.5 cm	Private Collection
	Portrait of Avenal St. George	1915	oil on canvas	81.5 cm x 66 cm	Private Collection
	The Poet	1915	oil on canvas	109.5 cm x 85.7 cm	Private Collection
	Madame Errázuriz	1915	oil on canvas	197 cm x 91 cm	Mildura Arts Centre
	Idina Wallace	1915	oil on canvas	197 cm x 116 cm	Private Collection
	Mrs Oscar Lewisohne	1915	oil on canvas	132 cm x 81 cm	Private Collection
	Portrait of Rosie, Fourth Marchioness of Headfort	1915	oil on canvas	128 cm x 97 cm	Private Collection
	Portrait of Winston Churchill	1916	oil on canvas	148 cm x 102.5 cm	National Portrait Gallery, London
	Portrait of Dr E.J. Dillon, War Correspondent and Publicis	c. 1916	oil on canvas	112 cm x 95 cm	National Gallery of Ireland
	The Man from Aran	1916	oil on canvas	119.5 cm x 86.5 cm	Private Collection
	Miss Dorothy Stiles	1916	oil on canvas	76.2 cm x 63.5 cm	Private Collection
	Lady Rocksavage	1916	oil on canvas	148 cm x 102.5 cm	Private Collection
	The holy well	1916	oil on canvas	234 cm x 136 cm	National Gallery of Ireland
	Beaumont Hamel	c. 1916-early 1920s	oil on canvas	76.1 cm x 91.2 cm	Royal Academy of Arts
	The Rt Hon Viscount Bryce GCVO PC	1917	oil on canvas	91.8 cm x 86.4 cm	Aberdeen Art Gallery
	The Right Hon. Louis Botha	c. 1917-1919	oil on canvas	76.5 cm x 63.8 cm	National Gallery of Victoria
	Major Orpen	1917	Watercolour, ink and pencil on paper	26.6 cm x 25.4 cm	National Gallery of Ireland
	Blown Up	1917	pencil and watercolor on paper	58.4 cm x 43.5 cm	Imperial War Museum
	The Schwaben Redoubt	1917	oil on canvas	63.5 cm x 76.2 cm	Imperial War Museum
	Self-portrait	1917	oil on canvas	76.2 cm x 63.5 cm	Imperial War Museum
	A Tank	1917	chalk, charcoal, and watercolor on paper	59 cm x 45 cm	Imperial War Museum
	The Artist- Self Portrait	1917	oil on canvas	76.2 cm x 63.5 cm	Imperial War Museum
	The Butte de Warlencourt	1917	oil on canvas	76.2 cm x 91.4 cm	Imperial War Museum
	A German Gunners Shelter, Warlencourt	1917	oil on canvas	76.2 cm x 63.5 cm	Imperial War Museum
	A House at Peronne	1917	oil on canvas	76.2 cm x 63.5 cm	Imperial War Museum
	Dieppe	1917	oil on canvas	76.2 cm x 63.5 cm	Imperial War Museum
	The Main Street, Thiepval	1917	oil on canvas	63.5 cm x 76.2 cm	Imperial War Museum
	German Wire, Thiepval	1917	oil on canvas	63.5 cm x 76.2 cm	Imperial War Museum
	The Courtyard, Hotel Sauvage, Cassel, Nord	1917	oil on canvas	60.9 cm x 49.5 cm	Imperial War Museum
	The Household Brigade Passing to the Ypres Salient, Cassel	1917	oil on canvas	76.2 cm x 63.5 cm	Imperial War Museum
	Soldiers and Peasants, Cassel	1917	oil on canvas	76.2 cm x 63.5 cm	Imperial War Museum
	Ready to Start. Self-Portrait	1917	oil on canvas	60.8 cm x 49.4 cm	Imperial War Museum
	A Grenadier Guardsman	1917	oil on canvas	91.4 cm x 76.2 cm	Imperial War Museum
	A Highlander Passing a Grave	1917	oil on canvas	60.9 cm x 50.8 cm	Imperial War Museum
	Village: Evening	1917	oil on canvas	76.2 cm x 91.4 cm	Imperial War Museum
	Outside a Small Mine Crater, Bapaume Road	1917	oil on canvas	63.5 cm x 76.2 cm	Imperial War Museum
	A Man with a Cigarette Art	1917	pencil, chalk, and watercolor on paper	86.1 cm x 71.1 cm	Imperial War Museum
	Thiepval	1917	oil on canvas	63.5 cm x 76.2 cm	Imperial War Museum
	The Gunners' Shelter, Thiepval	1917	oil on canvas	63.5 cm x 76.2 cm	Imperial War Museum
	Inside a Small Mine Crater, La Boisselle	1917	oil on canvas	63.5 cm x 76.2 cm	Imperial War Museum
	The Great Mine, La Boisselle	1917	oil on canvas	76.2 cm x 91.4 m	Imperial War Museum
	Major F. E. Hotblack, DSO, MC	1917	oil on canvas	91.4 cm x 76.2 m	Imperial War Museum
	The Somme: A Clear Day; View from the British Trenches opposite La Boisselle, Showing the German Front Line and Mine Craters	1917	oil on canvas	76.2 cm x 91.4 m	Imperial War Museum
	View from the Old British Trenches: Looking towards La Boisselle, Courcelette on the Left, Martinpuich on the Right	1917	oil on canvas	76.2 cm x 91.4 m	Imperial War Museum
	Brigadier-General H J Elles, CB, DSO	1917	oil on canvas	91.4 cm x 76.2 m	Imperial War Museum
	Mines and the Bapaume Road, La Boisselle	1917	oil on canvas	63.5 cm x 76.2 cm	Imperial War Museum
	A Dead German in a Trench	1917	pencil, ink, and watercolor on wood	60.8 cm x 48 cm	Imperial War Museum
	A Captured German Munition Dump	1917	oil on canvas	45 cm x 57.7 cm	Imperial War Museum
	Tanks	1917	watercolor and chalk on paper	60.9 cm x 73.6 cm	Imperial War Museum
	The Main Street, Combles	1917	oil on canvas	76.2 cm x 63.5 cm	Imperial War Museum
	The Girls' College, Péronne	1917	oil on canvas	76.2 cm x 63.5 cm	Imperial War Museum
	The Big Crater	1917	oil on canvas	76.2 cm x 91.4 cm	Imperial War Museum
	My work Room, Cassel	1917	oil on canvas	49.5 cm x 60.9 cm	Imperial War Museum
	German Sick, Captured at Messines, in a Canadian Hospital	1917	oil on canvas	49.5 cm x 60.9 cm	Imperial War Museum
	The Return of a Patrol	1917	watercolor on paper	50.8 cm x 41.9 cm	Imperial War Museum
	Major-General H.M. Trenchard, CB, DSO, RFC	1917	oil on canvas	76.2 cm x 63.5 cm	Imperial War Museum
	Field-Marshal Sir Douglas Haig, KT, GCB, GCVO, KCIE, Commander-in-Chief, France, From December 15th 1915	1917	oil on canvas	74.9 cm x 63.5 cm	Imperial War Museum
	The Artist's Model, Yvonne	1917	oil on canvas	76.2 cm x 63.5 cm	Private Collection
	Adam and Eve at Péronne	1917	oil on canvas	76.2 cm x 63.5 cm	Imperial War Museum
	German planes visiting Cassel	1917	oil on canvas	76.2 cm x 63.5 cm	Imperial War Museum
	Thiepval Wood	1917	oil on canvas	63.5 cm x 76.2 cm	Imperial War Museum
	The Mascot of the Coldstream Guards Art	1917	oil on canvas	63.5 cm x 76.2 cm	Imperial War Museum
	The Church, Péronne	1917	pencil and watercolor on paper	49.5 cm x 40.6 cm	Imperial War Museum
	Death in the Snow	1917	oil on board	45 cm x 58.5 cm	National Gallery of Ireland
	The Bapaume Road- the road to the front, La Boisselle	1917	pencil and wash on paper	44.4 cm x 57.1 cm	Imperial War Museum
	Monsieur R D de Maratray, a French War Correspondent. (Le Petit Journal)	1917	oil on canvas	74.9 cm x 63.5 cm	Imperial War Museum
	A Grave in a Trench	1917	oil on canvas	76.2 cm x 63.5 cm	Imperial War Museum
	A Grave and a Mine Crater at La Boisselle, August 1917	1917	oil on canvas	63.5 cm x 76.2 cm	Imperial War Museum
	The Non-Commissioned Officer Pilot, Royal Flying Corps: Flight Sergeant W. G. Bennett	1917	oil on canvas	91.4 cm x 81.2 cm	Imperial War Museum
	Lieutenant Arthur Percival Foley Rhys Davids (1897–1917), DSO, MC	1917	oil on canvas	91.4 cm x 76.2 cm	Imperial War Museum
	An Airman- Lieut R T C Hoidge, Mc	1917	oil on canvas	91.4 cm x 76.2 cm	Imperial War Museum
	The Mad Woman of Douai	1918	oil on canvas	76.2 cm x 91.4 cm	Imperial War Museum
	Major J B McCudden, VC, DSO, MC, MM	1918	oil on canvas	91.4 cm x 76.2 cm	Imperial War Museum
	The First Chief Controller, QMAAC in France, Dame Helen Gwynne-Vaughan, CBE, DSC	1918	oil on canvas	91.4 cm x 76.2 cm	Imperial War Museum
	Major General L.J. Lipsett CB, CMG	1918	oil on canvas	91.7 cm x 76.5 cm	Canadian War Museum
	Major General Sir F.O.W. Loomis, KCB, CMG, DSO, and Bar	1918	oil on canvas	91.5 cm x 75.8 cm	Canadian War Museum
	General Sir Henry Seymour Rawlinson, Bart, GCVO, KCB, KCMG, Fourth Army	1918	oil on canvas	91.4 cm x 76.2 cm	Imperial War Museum
	Major General Sir Henry Burstall, KCB, CMG	1918	oil on canvas	91.7 cm x 76.4 cm	Canadian War Museum
	Major-General Sir David Watson	1918	oil on canvas	76 cm x 91.7 cm	Canadian War Museum
	Prince Antoine d'Orleans et Braganza, MC	1918	oil on canvas	91.4 cm x 76.2 cm	Imperial War Museum
	Brigadier-General the Rt Hon J E B Seely, CB, DSO, MP, 1918	1918	oil on canvas	91.4 cm x 76.2 cm	Imperial War Museum
	Brigadier General William Thomas Francis Horwood (1868–1943), DSO, Late Provost-Marshal, General Headquarters, British Expeditionary Force	1918	oil on canvas	76.2 cm x 63.5 cm	Imperial War Museum
	Some Members of the Allied Press Camp, with their Press Officers	1918	oil on canvas	91.4 cm x 76.2 cm	Imperial War Museum
	General Sir Herbert Charles Onslow Plumer, GCMG, GCVO, KCB, Second Army	1918	oil on canvas	91.4 cm x 76.2 cm	Imperial War Museum
	Lieutenant-General Archibald Cameron Macdonell	1918	oil on canvas	91.5 cm x 76 cm	Canadian War Museum
	Bombing- Night	1918	oil on canvas	76.2 cm x 63.5 cm	Imperial War Museum
	Marshal Foch, OM	1918	oil on canvas	91.4 cm x 76.2 cm	Imperial War Museum
	The Thinker on the Butte de Warlencourt	1918	oil on canvas	91.8 cm x 76.9 cm	Private Collection
	Harvest, 1918	1918	oil on canvas	76.2 cm x 63.5 cm	Imperial War Museum
	The Refugee (A)	1918	oil on canvas	91.4 cm x 76.2 cm	Imperial War Museum
	The Refugee (B)	1918	oil on canvas	76.2 cm x 63.5 cm	Imperial War Museum
	Dead Germans in a Trench	1918	oil on canvas	91.4 cm x 76.2 cm	Imperial War Museum
	Zonnebeke	1918	oil on canvas	63.5 cm x 76.2 cm	Tate
	In Their Cellar in Amiens: Captain R. Maude, Department of the Army, Provost Marshal General, Awarded the Croix de Guerre by the French Authorities, and Colonel Du Tiel, Commandant d'Armes, Amiens	1918	oil on canvas	76.2 cm x 63.5 cm	Imperial War Museum
	Vivien St Georges	1918	oil on canvas	86.5 cm x 62 cm	Private Collection
	Changing Billets, Picardy	1918	oil on canvas	91.5 cm x 76.2 cm	Private Collection
	Portrait of Captain Wood of the Royal Inniskilling Fusiliers	1919	oil on canvas	76.5 cm x 63.5 cm	Private Collection
	Charles Sackville-West, 4th Baron Sackville	1919	oil on canvas	91.4 cm x 76.2 cm	National Portrait Gallery, London
	Sir Joseph George Ward, 1st Bt	c. 1919	oil on canvas	74.9 cm x 62.2 cm	National Portrait Gallery, London
	Lieutenant General Sir Arthur Currie, GCMG, KCB	1919	oil on canvas	91.8 cm x 71.5 cm	Canadian War Museum
	Lieutenant Colonel A. N. Lee, DSO, OBE, TD, Censor in France of Paintings and Drawings by Artists at the Front	1919	oil on canvas	92 cm x 71 cm	Imperial War Museum
	Ganga Singh, Maharaja of Bikaner	1919	oil on canvas	76.2 cm x 63.5 cm	National Portrait Gallery, London
	Faisal I of Iraq	1919	oil on canvas	Unknown	Library of Congress
	Edward George Villiers Stanley, 17th Earl of Derby	1919	oil on canvas	76.2 cm x 64.9 cm	National Portrait Gallery, London
	Rufus Isaacs, 1st Marquess of Reading	1919	oil on canvas	91.4 cm x 61 cm	National Portrait Gallery, London
	Sir Adrian Carton de Wiart	1919	oil on canvas	91.4 cm x 76.2 cm	National Portrait Gallery, London
	John Joseph Pershing	1919	oil on canvas	89.9 cm x 74.6 cm	National Portrait Gallery
	David Beatty, 1st Earl Beatty (1871-1936)	1919	oil on canvas	76.2 cm x 63.5 cm	National Galleries of Scotland
	John Andrew Hamilton, Viscount Sumner	1919	oil on canvas	76.2 cm x 63.5 cm	National Portrait Gallery, London
	Rosslyn Erskine Wemyss, Baron Wester Wemyss	1919	oil on canvas	91.4 cm x 76.2 cm	National Portrait Gallery, London
	Sir Henry Hughes Wilson, 1st Bt	1919	oil on canvas	91.4 cm x 76.2 cm	National Portrait Gallery, London
	Arthur James Balfour, 1st Earl of Balfour, OM, KG, PC, FBA, FRS	1919	oil on canvas	88.5 cm x 69.5 cm	British Academy
	Charles Hardinge, 1st Baron Hardinge of Penshurst	1919	oil on canvas	63.5 x 50.8 cm	National Portrait Gallery, London
	Portrait of Sir Robert Laird Borden	1919	oil on canvas	76.1 x 64 cm	Library and Archives of Canada
	Woodrow Wilson	1919	oil on canvas	38.6 x 32.3 cm	The White House
	The Signing of Peace in the Hall of Mirrors, Versailles, 28th June 1919	1919	oil on canvas	152.4 cm x 127 cm	Imperial War Museum
	A Peace Conference at the Quai d'Orsay	1919	oil on canvas	124.4 cm x 101.9 cm	Imperial War Museum
	Edgar Algernon Robert Gascoyne-Cecil, 1st Viscount Cecil of Chelwood	1919	oil on canvas	91.4 cm x 76.2 cm	National Portrait Gallery, London
	William Ferguson Massey	1919	oil on canvas	90.2 cm x 74.9 cm	National Portrait Gallery, London
	David Lloyd George (1863–1945)	1919	oil on canvas	92 cm x 71.7 cm	National Museum Cardiff
	George Allardice, 1st Baron Riddell of Walton Heath, 1865 - 1934. Newspaper prorietor and diarist	1919	oil on canvas	127.6 cm x 102.2 cm	National Gallery of Scotland
	Sir Frederick Sykes (1877–1954)	1919	oil on canvas	92 cm x 78.5 cm	Royal Air Force Museum
	The Rt Hon. George Nicol Barnes (1859–1940), MP, CH	1919	oil on canvas	76.6 cm x 63.5 cm	Cartwright Hall Art Gallery
	T. E. Lawrence	1919	oil on canvas	Unknown	Unknown
	Portrait of Master John S. Drum, Jr.	1920	oil on canvas	91.5 cm x 76 cm	Private Collection
	Sir Hugh Kerr Anderson	c. 1920	oil on canvas	75 cm x 63 cm	University of Cambridge
	Sir Thomas Jaffrey, Bt Lld	c. 1920-1926	oil on canvas	127.8 cm x 102.2 cm	Aberdeen Art Gallery
	Sir Thomas Jaffrey, Bt LLD, Chairman of Aberdeen Art Gallery Committee (1928-51)	1920	oil on canvas	111.7 cm x 76.7 cm	Aberdeen Art Gallery
	Charles Villiers Stanford (1852–1924), Trinity College Organist and Composeer	1920	oil on canvas	127 cm x 102 cm	University of Cambridge
	Sir William McCormick	1920	oil on canvas	101.6 cm x 127 cm	Tate
	Le Chef de l'Hôtel Chatham, Paris	1921	oil on canvas	127 cm x 102.5 cm	Royal Academy of Arts
	Lady Marriott	1921	oil on canvas	73.1 cm x 60.7 cm	Private Collection
	Nude Girl Reading	1921	oil on canvas	93 cm x 76 cm	Private collection
	Francine J. M. Clark	c. 1921-1922	oil on canvas	101.9 cm x 76.2 cm	Clark Art Institute
	Robert Sterling Clark	c. 1921-1922	oil on canvas	94 cm x 76.2 cm	Clark Art Institute
	Stephen Carlton Clark	c. 1921	oil on canvas	94 cm x 76.2 cm	Private Collection
	Susan Vanderpoel Clark	1921	oil on canvas	104.1 cm x 76 cm	Private Collection
	Evelyn Marshall Field (Mrs. Marshall Field III)	1921	oil on canvas	76.2 cm x 63.5 cm	Yale Center for British Art
	Portrait of Earl Haig	1921	oil on canvas	120 cm x 110 cm	Oxford University
	The Right Honourable Baron Leverhulme (1851–1925), Honorary Freeman of the Borough, Mayor of Bolton (1918–1919)	1921	oil on canvas	190 cm x 138 cm	Bolton Town Hall
	Gertrude Sanford	1922	oil on canvas	91.5 cm x 76.2 cm	Private Collection
	John L. Severance	1922	oil on canvas	91.5 cm x 81.8 cm	Cleveland Museum of Art
	Marcus Samuel (1853–1927), Lord Bearsted	1922	oil on canvas	72 cm x 63 cm	Guildhall Art Gallery
	Portrait of Roland Knoedler	1922	oil on canvas	91.4 cm x 76.8 cm	Unknown
	Armistice Night	1923	oil on canvas	Unknown	Unknown
	Portrait of John Count McCormack (1884-1945), Tenor	1923	oil on canvas	104 cm x 86.4 cm	National Gallery of Ireland
	Thomas Banks Strong (1861–1944), Bishop of Oxford	1923	oil on canvas	87.6 cm x 95.9 cm	Christ Church Picture Gallery
	David Lloyd Roberts (1835–1920)	1923	oil on canvas	94.7 cm x 84.5 cm	Royal College of Physicians
	Sir Thomas Paxton (1860–1930), Lord Provost of Glasgow (1920–1923)	1923	oil on canvas	127 cm x 101.6 cm	Glasgow Museums Resource Centre
	Louisa Brandreth Aldrich-Blake (1865–1925)	1923	oil on canvas	127 cm x 102 cm	Royal Free Hospital
	Paul Waterhouse (1861–1924), PRIBA	c. 1923	oil on canvas	79 cm x 64 cm	Royal Institute of British Architects
	Sir Alexander Spence (1866–1939), Lord Provost of Dundee (1920–1923)	c. 1923	oil on canvas	127 cm x 101.6 cm	Dundee Art Gallery and Museum
	To the Unknown British Soldier in France	1923-1927	oil on canvas	154.2 cm x 128.9 cm	Imperial War Museum
	Paul Mellon	1924	oil on canvas	72.4 cm x 59.7 cm	Yale Center for British Art
	Self Portrait	1924	oil on canvas	79.1 cm x 64.8 cm	Fitzwilliam Museum
	Sunlight	1925	oil on canvas	50 cm x 61 cm	National Gallery of Ireland
	Thomas Howarth, JP	1925	oil on canvas	77 cm x 66 cm	Bradford Museums and Galleries
	Sir William Meff, Lord Provost of Aberdeen (1911–1925)	1925	oil on canvas	127 cm x 101.5 cm	Aberdeen Art Gallery
	Masked Figures	early 20th Century	oil on canvas	76.3 cm x 63.4 cm	Royal Academy of Arts
	Dr Butler in Robes	early 20th Century	oil on canvas	102 cm x 86.5 cm	Royal Academy of Arts
	Head of a Girl	early 20th Century	oil on canvas	91.5 cm x 71.1 cm	UCL Art Museum
	William West Jones	early 20th Century	oil on canvas	83.8 cm x 62.2 cm	Oxford University
	The New Bonnet	early 20th Century	oil on canvas	44 cm x 34 cm	Potteries Museum & Art Gallery
	The Right Honourable Sir Clifford Allbutt	early 20th Century	oil on canvas	127 cm x 102.2 cm	Fitzwilliam Museum
	Portrait of a Young Gentleman	early 20th Century	oil on canvas	60.7 cm x 51.1 cm	Royal Academy of Arts
	Untitled	early 20th Century	oil on canvas	75.6 cm x 54.6 cm	Robert Gordon University
	Portrait of a Youth	early 20th Century	oil on canvas	36.7 cm x 26.3 cm	Sheffield Museums
	Summer Time	early 20th Century	oil on canvas	61 cm x 49.9 cm	Ulster Museum
	Mother and Child on the Beach	early 20th Century	oil on canvas	76.2 cm x 63.3 cm	Royal Academy of Arts
	Joseph Thompson	early 20th Century	oil on canvas	76.3 cm x 63.5 cm	Royal Academy of Arts
	Professor Gregory Foster	early 20th Century	oil on canvas	76.2 cm x 62.2 cm	UCL Art Museum
	Sir J. Ambrose Fleming (1849–1945), MA	early 20th Century	oil on canvas	88.9 cm x 76.2 cm	UCL Art Museum
	Miss Kennard	early 20th Century	oil on canvas	208.2 cm x 87.8 cm	Royal Academy of Arts
	General Sir John S. Cowans (1862–1921)	early 20th Century	oil on canvas	127 cm x 102.5 cm	Tullie House Museum and Art Gallery
	Sir John Rutherford (1854–1932)	early 20th Century	oil on canvas	75 cm x 62 cm	Blackburn Museum and Art Gallery
	John Phillips	early 20th Century	oil on canvas	50 cm x 35 cm	Yorkshire Museum
	Louis Bernhard Baron	1926	oil on canvas	102.3 cm x 87 cm	Private Collection
	Penelope Lawrence	1926	oil on canvas	Unknown	Unknown
	Mrs Thomas Howarth	1926	oil on canvas	77 cm x 66 cm	Cartwright Hall Art Gallery
	Landscape	1926	oil on canvas	87 cm x 69 cm	Walker Art Gallery
	Charles Lawrence, 1st Baron Lawrence of Kingsgate	1927	oil on canvas	106.6 cm x 91.5 cm	Unknown
	Jacob Epstein	1927	oil on canvas	Unknown	Baltimore Museum of Art
	Portrait of Thomas Glass, seated half-length, in a brown three-piece suit	1927	oil on canvas	101.6 cm x 86.4 cm	Private Collection
	David Lloyd George, 1st Earl Lloyd-George	1927	oil on canvas	88.9 cm x 94 cm	National Portrait Gallery, London
	Edward, Prince of Wales, Captain of the Royal and Ancient Golf Club of St Andrews	1927	oil on canvas	207 cm x 105.5 cm	Private Collection
	Dame Madge Kendal	c. 1927-1928	oil on canvas	102 cm x 87 cm	Tate
	Sir George Adam Smith	c. 1927-1928	oil on canvas	127.5 cm x 101 cm	University of Aberdeen
	Portrait of Captain Colin David Brodie	1928	oil on canvas	75 cm x 57.5 cm	Private Collection
	Sir Edwin Ray Lankester	1928	oil on canvas	86.2 cm x 101.7 cm	National Portrait Gallery, London
	Sir Ernest John Pickstone Benn (1875–1954), 2nd Bt	1928	oil on canvas	101 cm x 86 cm	Birmingham Museums Trust
	Sir Hugh Reid (1860–1935), in the Uniform of the Scottish Archers	1929	oil on canvas	106.7 cm x 81.3 cm	Glasgow Museums
	Sir Robert Williams of Park	1929	oil on canvas	127 cm x 102 cm	Aberdeen Art Gallery
	Sir Walter Tapper (1861–1935), RA, PRIBA	1929	oil on canvas	102.3 cm x 86.5 cm	Royal Institute of British Architects
	Reginald Brabazon, 12th Earl of Meath	c. 1929	oil on canvas	101.6 cm x 86.4 cm	National Portrait Gallery, London
	Neville Chamberlain	1929	oil on canvas	100 cm x 77 cm	Parliamentary Art Collection
	Lord Ashfield	1930	oil on canvas	128 cm x 113 cm	London Transport Museum
	Sir Andrew Lewis, LLD, Lord Provost of Aberdeen	1930	oil on canvas	127 cm x 102 cm	Aberdeen Art Gallery
	Palm Sunday A.D. 33	1930	oil on canvas	42 cm x 50.5 cm	Private collection
	The Irish Wedding (sketch)	1931	oil on canvas	72.4 cm x 53.4 cm	Private collection
