= The Signing of Peace in the Hall of Mirrors =

Painting by William Orpen

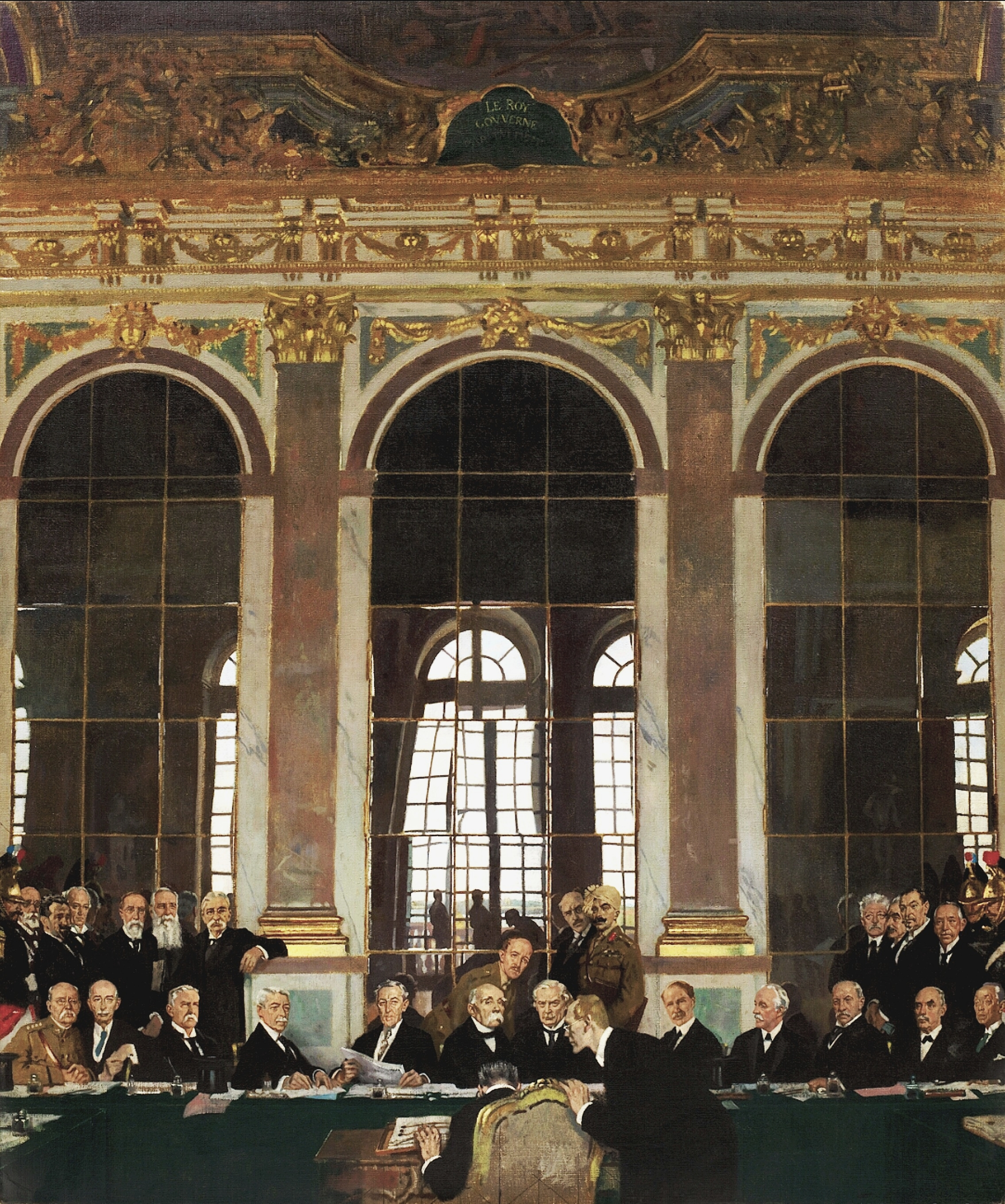
- Artist: Sir William Orpen
- Year: 1919
- Type: oil on canvas
- Dimensions: 127 cm × 152 cm (50 in × 60 in)
- Location: Imperial War Museum, London

The Signing of Peace in the Hall of Mirrors, Versailles, 28 June 1919 is an oil-on-canvas painting by Irish artist William Orpen, completed in 1919. It was one of the paintings commissioned from Orpen to commemorate the Peace Conference at Versailles in 1919. The work is held by the Imperial War Museum, in London.

== Background ==
Orpen was one of the first people chosen as a war artist by the British Ministry of Information in 1917. Orpen was also the official painter at the peace conference and was commissioned to paint three canvases to record the proceedings. The work was the most expensive of the British public art commissions associated with the First World War: Orpen was paid £3,000; by comparison, John Singer Sargent received £300 for his much larger painting Gassed.

The painting depicts the signature of the Treaty of Versailles by representatives from Germany on 28 June 1919 that formally ended the First World War. The group portrait depicts soldiers, diplomats and politicians who attended the conference while the treaty was signed in the opulent surroundings of Louis XIV's Hall of Mirrors at the Palace of Versailles. High up can be seen the words "Le Roy Gouverne par lui meme" (French: "The King governs alone"). It measures 152.4 × 127 centimetres (60.0 × 50.0 in).

Orpen grew to dislike the politicians at the conference and considered them vain and greedy. In his painting, they are dwarfed by the scale of the palace.

== Subjects ==
The people depicted are:

In the front row:

- Johannes Bell, German Centre Party politician, Reichskolonialminister (Minister of Colonial Affairs) and Reichsverkehrsminister (Minister of Transport), sitting in a chair, signing the treaty
- Hermann Müller, German SPD politician and Reichsaußenminister (Foreign Minister), stands beside him, leaning over

Seated in the middle row, from left to right:

- General Tasker H. Bliss, US Army officer and former Chief of Staff of the United States Army, in army uniform
- Edward M. House, US adviser to Woodrow Wilson
- Henry White, US diplomat and former US Ambassador to Italy and to France
- Robert Lansing, US Secretary of State
- Woodrow Wilson, President of the United States, holding papers
- Georges Clemenceau, Prime Minister of France
- David Lloyd George, British Prime Minister
- Bonar Law, British Lord Privy Seal (and later Prime Minister)
- Arthur Balfour, British Secretary of State for Foreign Affairs and former British Prime Minister
- Alfred Milner, 1st Viscount Milner, British Secretary of State for the Colonies
- George Barnes, British Minister Without Portfolio representing Organised Labour
- Marquis Saionji Kinmochi, genrō and former Prime Minister of Japan

Standing in the back row, from left to right

- Eleftherios Venizelos, Prime Minister of Greece
- Afonso Costa, former Prime Minister of Portugal
- Sir George Riddell, British journalist
- Sir George Foster, Canadian MP and delegate
- Nikola Pašić, former Prime Minister of Serbia and Prime Minister of Yugoslavia, with long white beard
- Stéphen Pichon, French Minister of Foreign Affairs, resting on a pillar
- Colonel Sir Maurice Hankey, British civil servant and first Cabinet Secretary, leaning over behind Clemenceau
- Edwin Montagu, British Secretary of State for India, behind the Maharajah of Bikaner
- Ganga Singh, Maharajah of Bikaner, from India, one of only two non-European members of the Imperial War Cabinet, leaning against a pillar
- Vittorio Emanuele Orlando, former Prime Minister of Italy
- Paul Hymans, Belgian Minister for Foreign Affairs
- General Louis Botha, Prime Minister of South Africa
- Billy Hughes, Prime Minister of Australia

Orpen is depicted twice, as an indistinct figure visible in the distorting mirrors behind the main subjects.

== Other paintings ==
Orpen's other paintings of the conference depict preliminary discussions of the "Council of Ten" in the Hall of Clocks at the French Ministry of Foreign Affairs at the Quai d'Orsay, and another showing a coffin lying in state in a marble hall covered by a Union Flag.

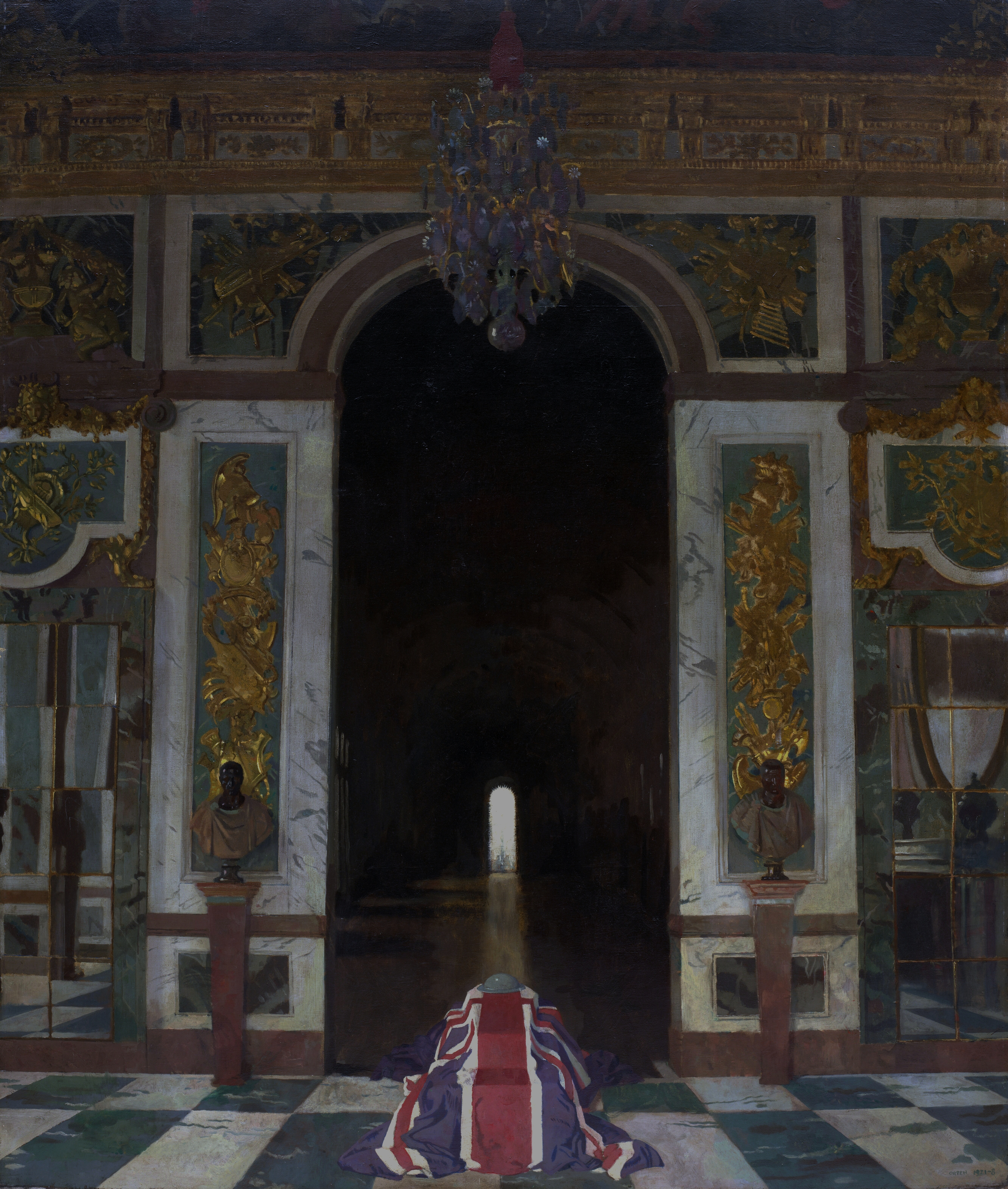
To the Unknown British Soldier in France

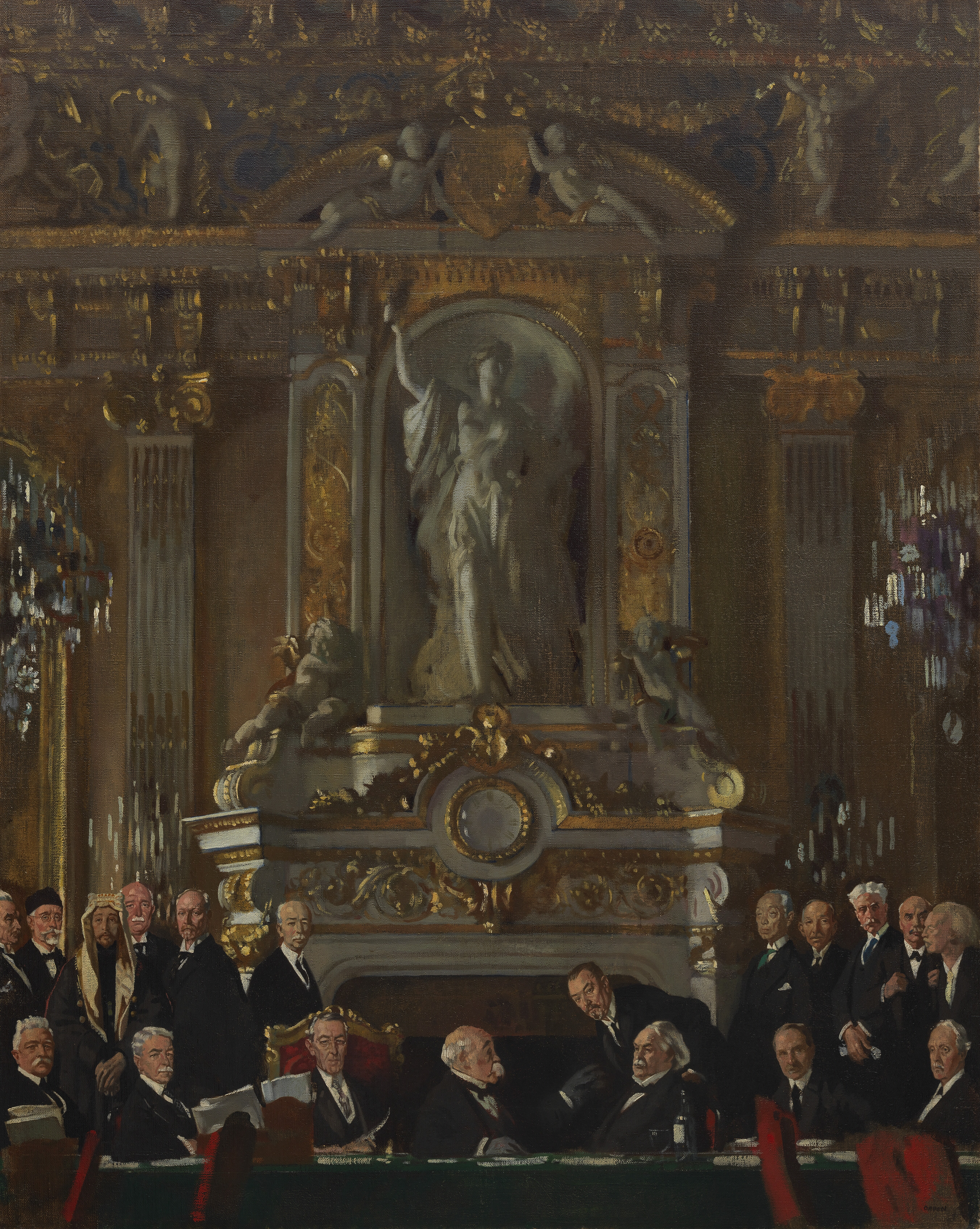
A Peace Conference at the Quai d'Orsay

== See also ==
- List of paintings by William Orpen
