= Homage to Manet =

Painting by William Orpen

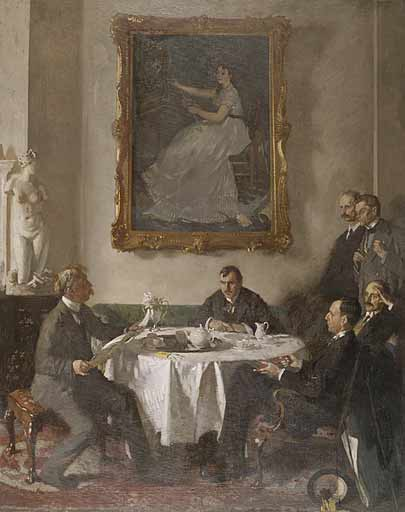
- Artist: William Orpen
- Year: 1909
- Type: Oil on canvas, portrait painting
- Dimensions: 162.9 cm × 130 cm (64.1 in × 51 in)
- Location: Manchester Art Gallery, Manchester

Homage to Manet is a 1909 oil painting by the Irish artist William Orpen. As a conversation piece, it depicts a number of leading figures of the Edwardian art world. They are shown at the art dealer Hugh Lane's house in South Bolton Gardens in London, gathered around the portrait of Eva Gonzalès by Édouard Manet, which Lane owned. Amongst those depicted are Lane himself, the art critics George Moore, Dugald Sutherland MacColl and the artists Philip Wilson Steer, Henry Tonks and Walter Sickert, all of whom were admirers of French Impressionism.

Orpen had been planning the painting since 1906, when Lane first acquired the portrait. The title and composition make reference to the 1864 painting Homage to Delacroix by Henri Fantin-Latour, a tribute to the Romantic painter Eugène Delacroix, in which Manet himself had appeared. The painting was displayed at the New English Art Club exhibition of 1909. The following year it was purchased by Manchester Art Gallery.

== See also ==
- List of paintings by William Orpen

== Bibliography ==
- McConkey, Kenneth. Impressionism in Britain. Yale University Press, 1995.
- Morin, Christina & Corporaal, Marguérite. Traveling Irishness in the Long Nineteenth Century. Springer International Publishing, 2017.
