= Chef's uniform =

Common uniform worn by professional cooks

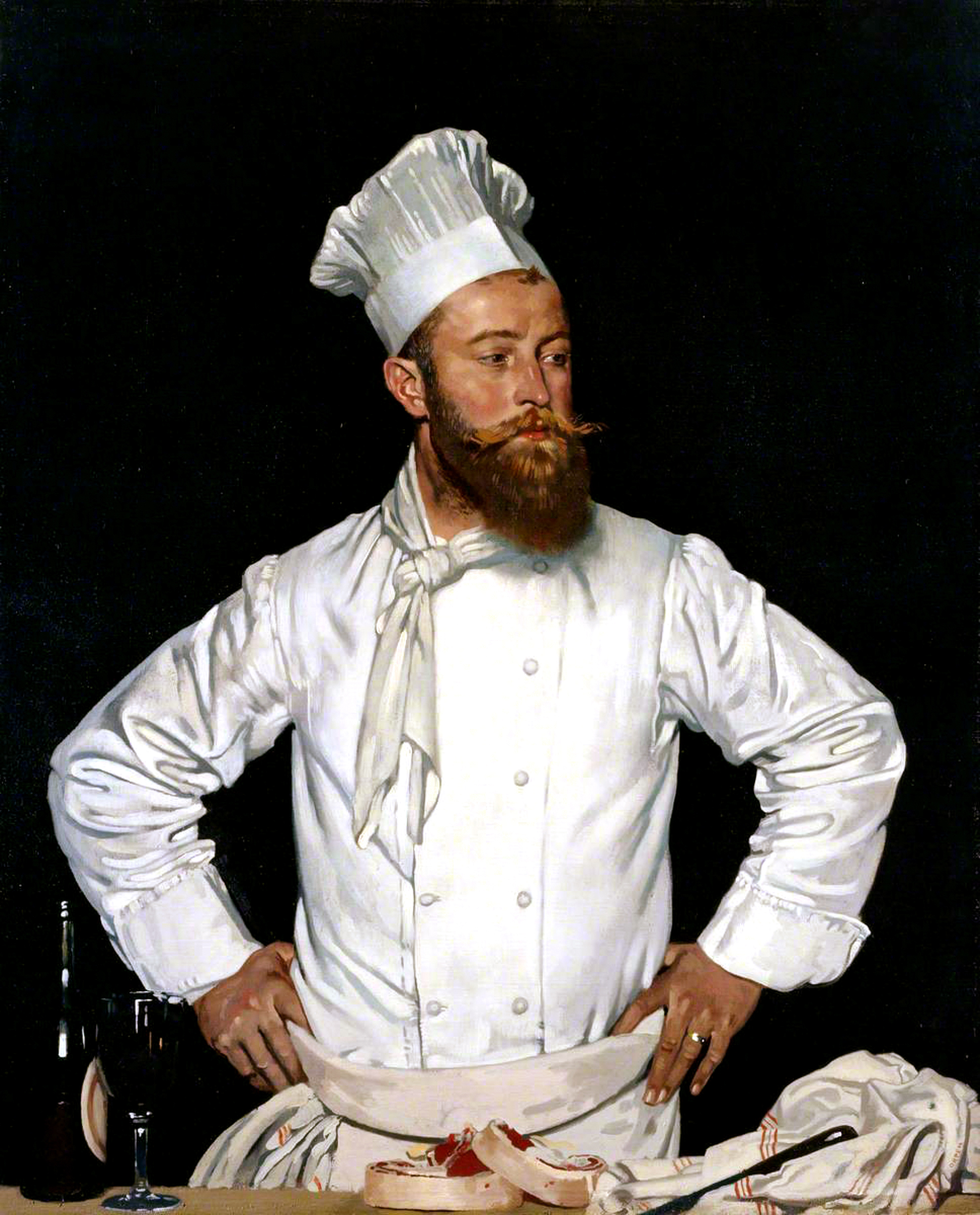
The traditional chef's uniform (Le Chef de l'Hôtel Chatham, Paris, by William Orpen, painted ca. 1921)

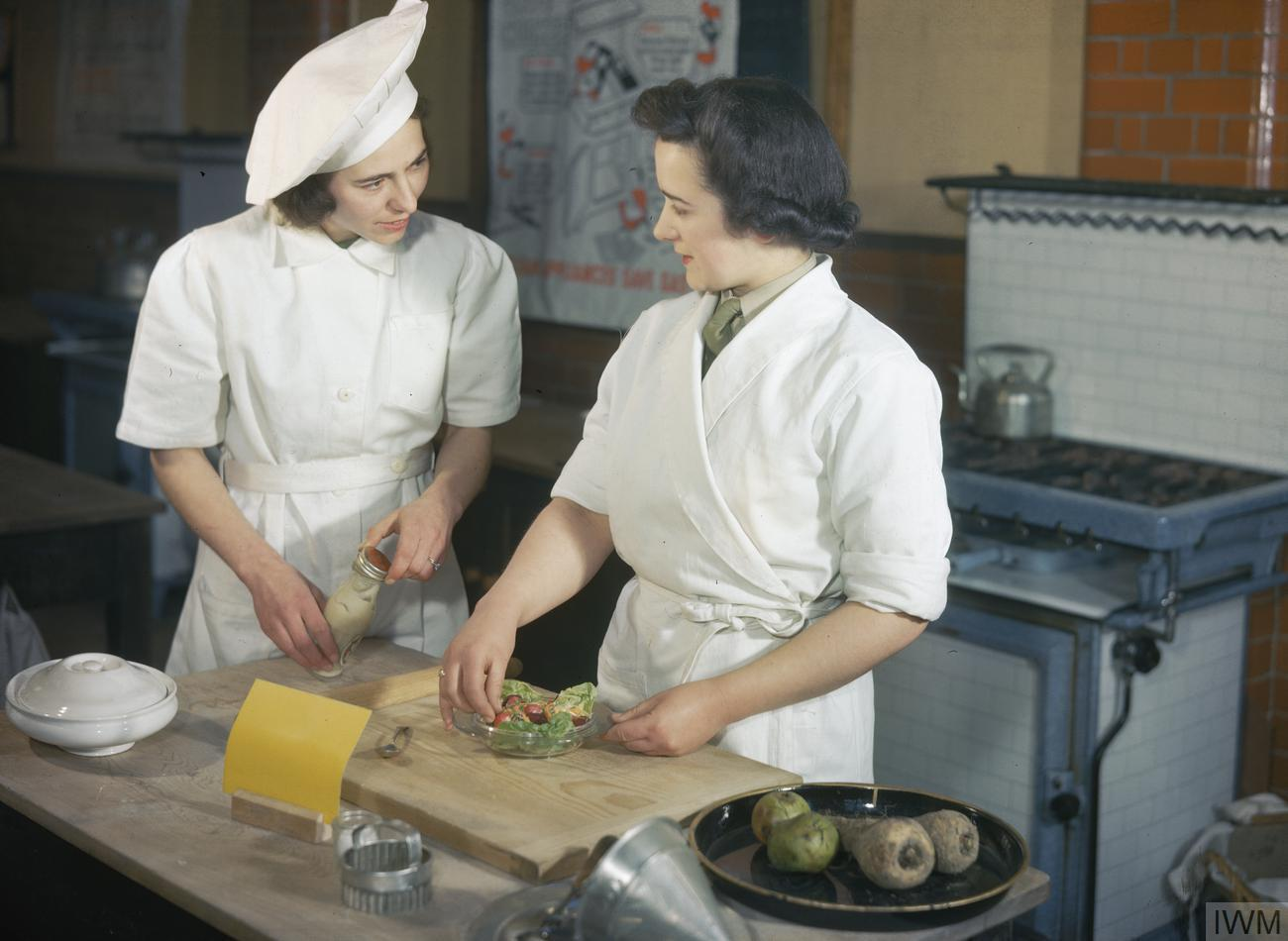
A chef and trainee during World War II

The traditional chef's uniform (or chef's whites) includes a toque blanche ("white hat"), white double-breasted jacket, pants in a black-and-white houndstooth pattern, and apron. It is a common occupational uniform in the Western world. The chef's buttons also have a meaning: while qualified chefs wear black buttons, students wear white buttons.

== Description ==
The toque is a chef's hat that dates back to the 16th century. Different heights may indicate rank within a kitchen and the number of folds can also signify a chef's expertise, with each pleat representing a technique that has been mastered.

In more traditional restaurants, especially traditional French restaurants, the white chef's coat is standard and considered part of a traditional uniform and as a practical chef's garment. The thick cotton cloth protects from the heat of stoves and ovens and protects from splattering of boiling liquids. The double breasted jacket is used to add protection to the wearer's chest and stomach area from burns from splashing liquids. This can also be reversed to hide stains. Knotted cloth buttons were used to survive frequent washing and contact with hot items. White is intended to signify cleanliness and is generally worn by highly visible head chefs. Increasingly, other colours such as black are becoming popular as well.

The long, wide chef's apron serves many functions. It is primarily worn for safety purposes. The apron will take the main impact should hot liquid spill over a pot as the chef is carrying it, and can be quickly removed to get it away from the undergarments and legs. Aprons that are lengthy and cover most of the front side of the body are very useful in restaurants and commercial kitchens. Normally these are called bib aprons which can be available in adjustable neck straps just because of commercial usage as uniform. Traditionally, the purpose of the apron was also to protect the wearer's garments from food stains and smells. It is also used to provide a convenient cloth with which to wipe messy hands or to dry washed hands, although this would be considered unhygienic now. Sometimes, an apron will contain pockets, enabling a chef to easily carry the tools of their trade.

These embellishments of uniform also serve as an indicator between the bounds of salaried, and casual or part-time staff.

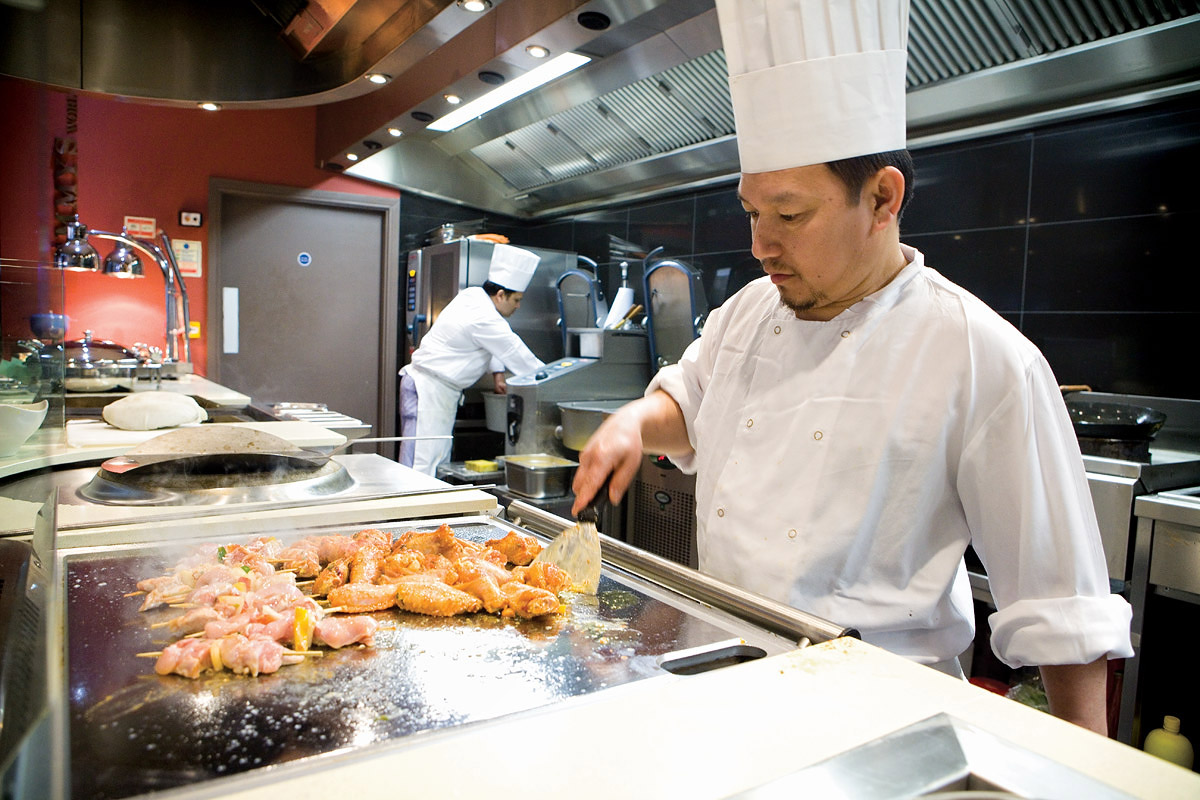
Chef at a restaurant in the United Kingdom, 2013

Chefs' clothing remains a standard in the food industry. The tradition of wearing this type of clothing dates back to the mid-19th century. Marie-Antoine Carême, a popular French chef, is credited with developing the current chef's uniform. The toques were already used, but he sought a uniform to honour the chef. White was chosen for the chef's coat to signify cleanliness. Later, the French master chef, Georges Auguste Escoffier, brought the traditional chef's coat to London, managing the restaurants at the Savoy Hotel and then at the Carlton Hotel.

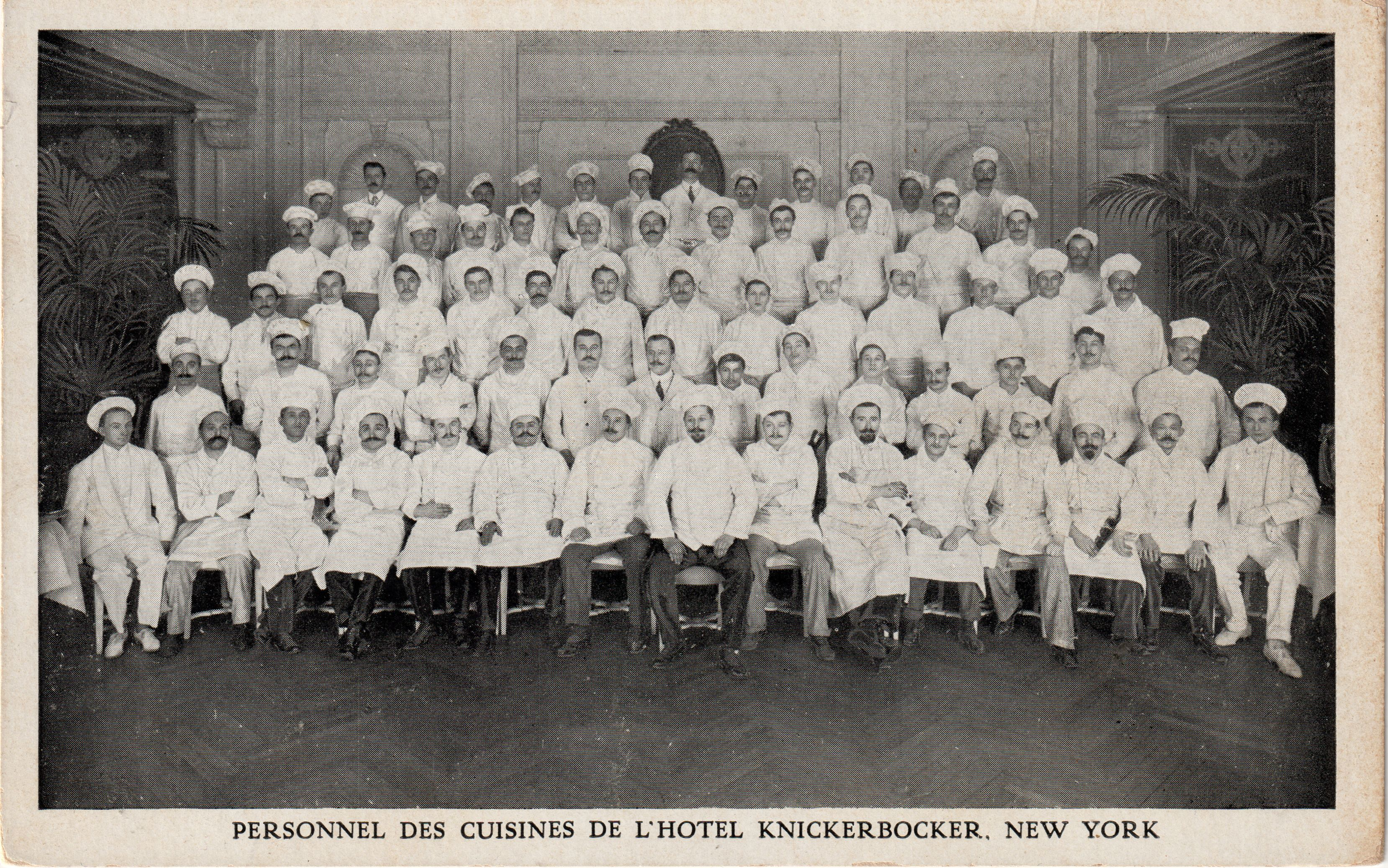
Kitchen staff of the Hotel Knickerbocker, New York - circa 1930s, wearing cooks' uniforms
