= Dead Germans in a Trench =

1918 oil painting by William Orpen

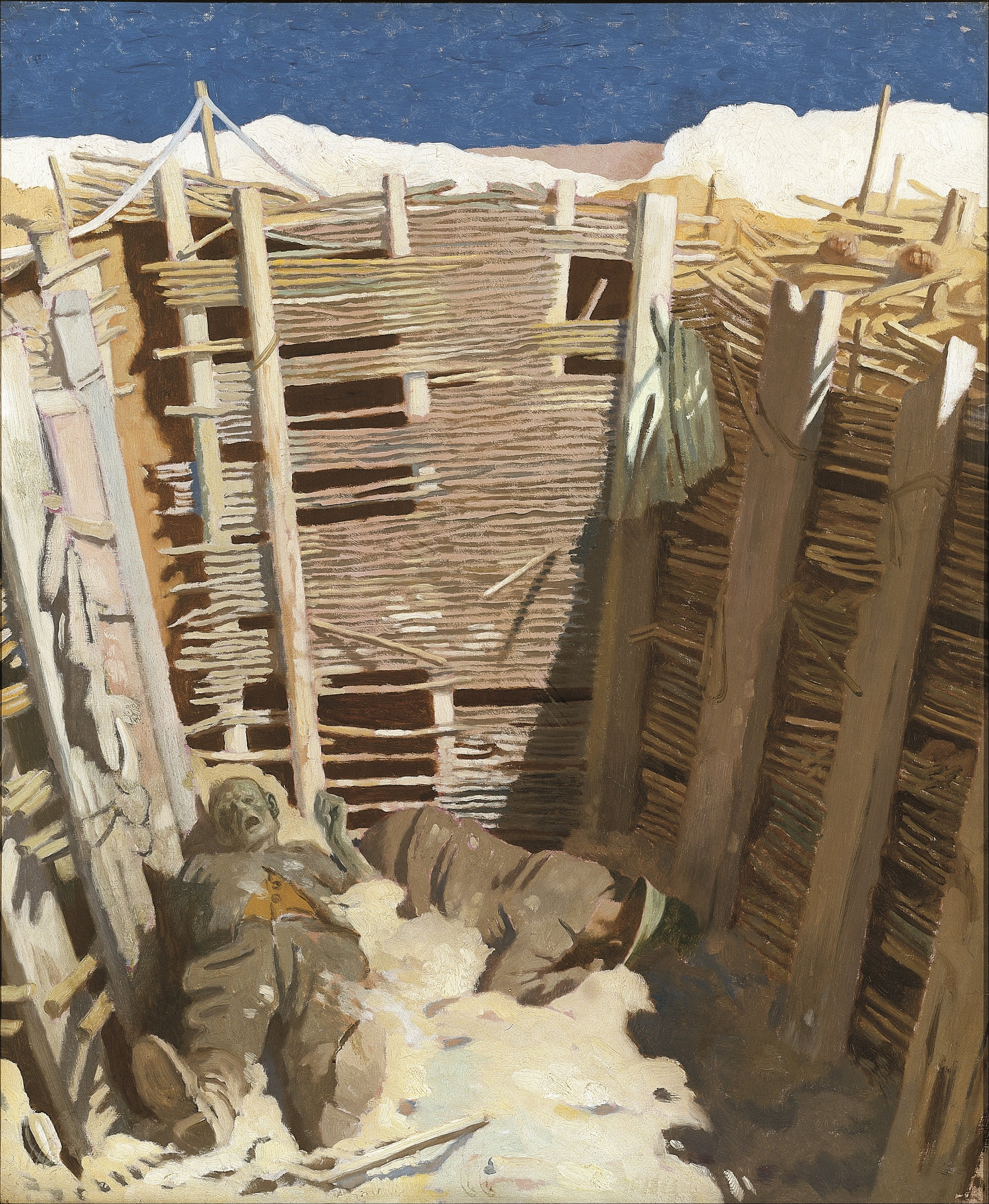
- Artist: Sir William Orpen
- Year: 1918
- Type: oil painting
- Dimensions: 91.4 cm × 76.2 cm (36.0 in × 30.0 in)
- Location: Imperial War Museum; London

Dead Germans in a Trench is an oil on canvas painting by Irish artist William Orpen, from 1918. The artist donated the painting to the Imperial War Museum, in London, in 1918.

== History and description ==
It was made during the First World War. It was inspired by the battlefield of the Battle of the Somme that Orpen had visited in 1917, and depicts the bodies of two dead German soldiers sinking into the mud at the bottom of a trench.

The painting depicts two dead German soldiers, one lies on his back, with an agonised open-mouthed expression on his face and a clenched hand raised. The skin on the face and arms are painted in a blue-green colour, suggesting putrefaction and decomposition. The other, wearing a helmet, lies face down in the mud. In the background are the wooden wattle sides of the trench, supported by wooden planks, with white heaps of chalk spoil beyond, and a deep azure sky above. The bright colours contrast with the sombre subject matter. It measures 91.4 by 76.2 centimetres (36.0 in × 30.0 in).

It was first exhibited at Agnew's Gallery on Bond Street in London in May 1918, after the initial decision of the military censor Arthur Lee to deny permission was overruled. The Times commented that "Mr Orpen is certainly not a sentimentalist; he seems to paint with cold, serene skill, just as he might paint a bunch of flowers" and "only Germans die in this war".

== See also ==
- List of paintings by William Orpen
