= Toque =

Type of hat with narrow or no brim

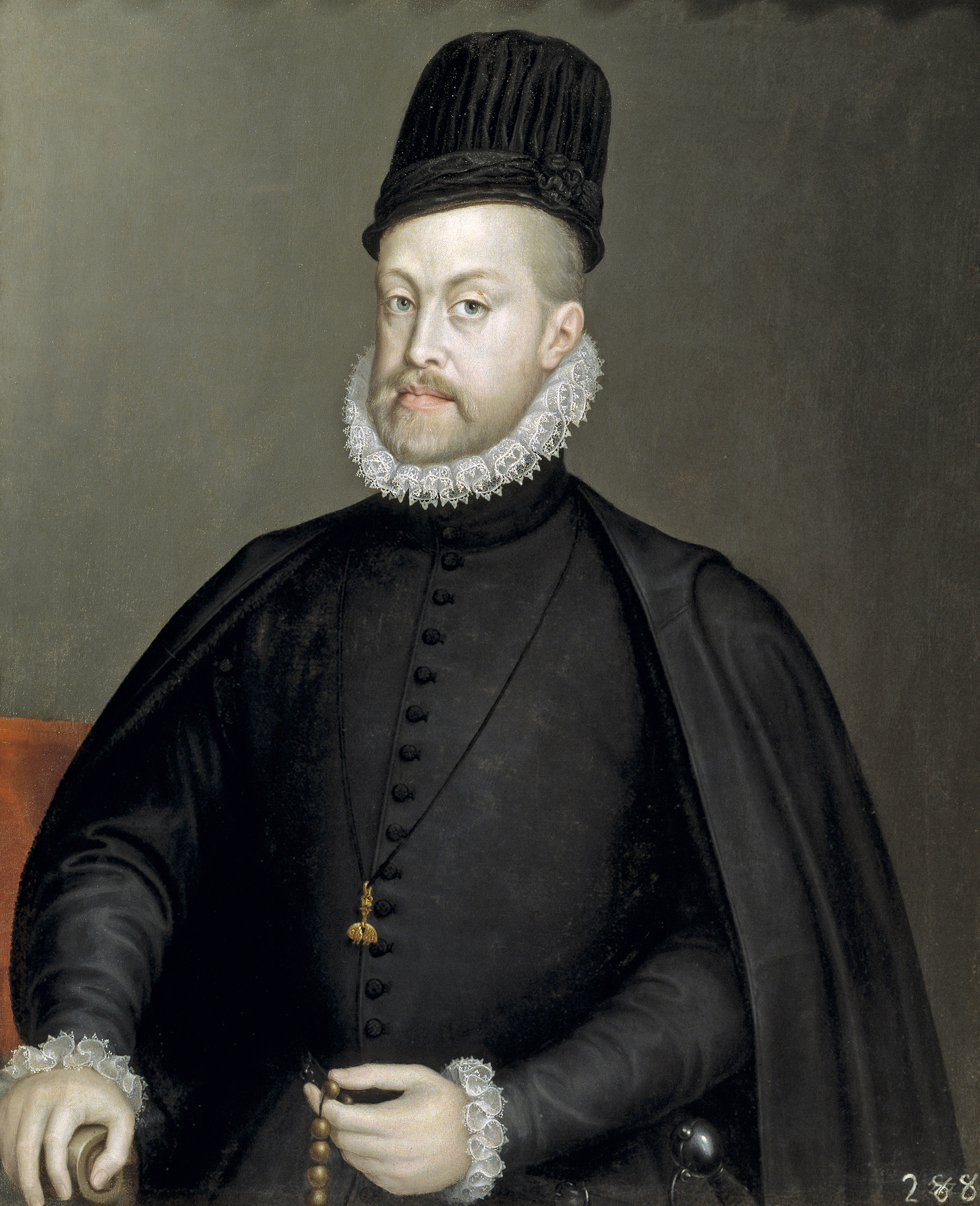
- King Philip II of Spain, wearing the Spanish tocado, late 16th century. Painting by Sofonisba Anguissola
- Type: Narrow-brimmed or brimless hat
- Material: Knitted yarn, starched cloth, or velvet

A toque (/toʊk/ or /tɒk/) is a type of hat with a narrow brim or no brim at all.

Toques were popular from the 13th to the 16th century in Europe, especially France. They were revived in the 1930s; nowadays, they are primarily known as the traditional headgear for professional cooks, except in Canada, where the term toque is used interchangeably with the French Canadian spelling of tuque to refer to knit caps.

== Name ==
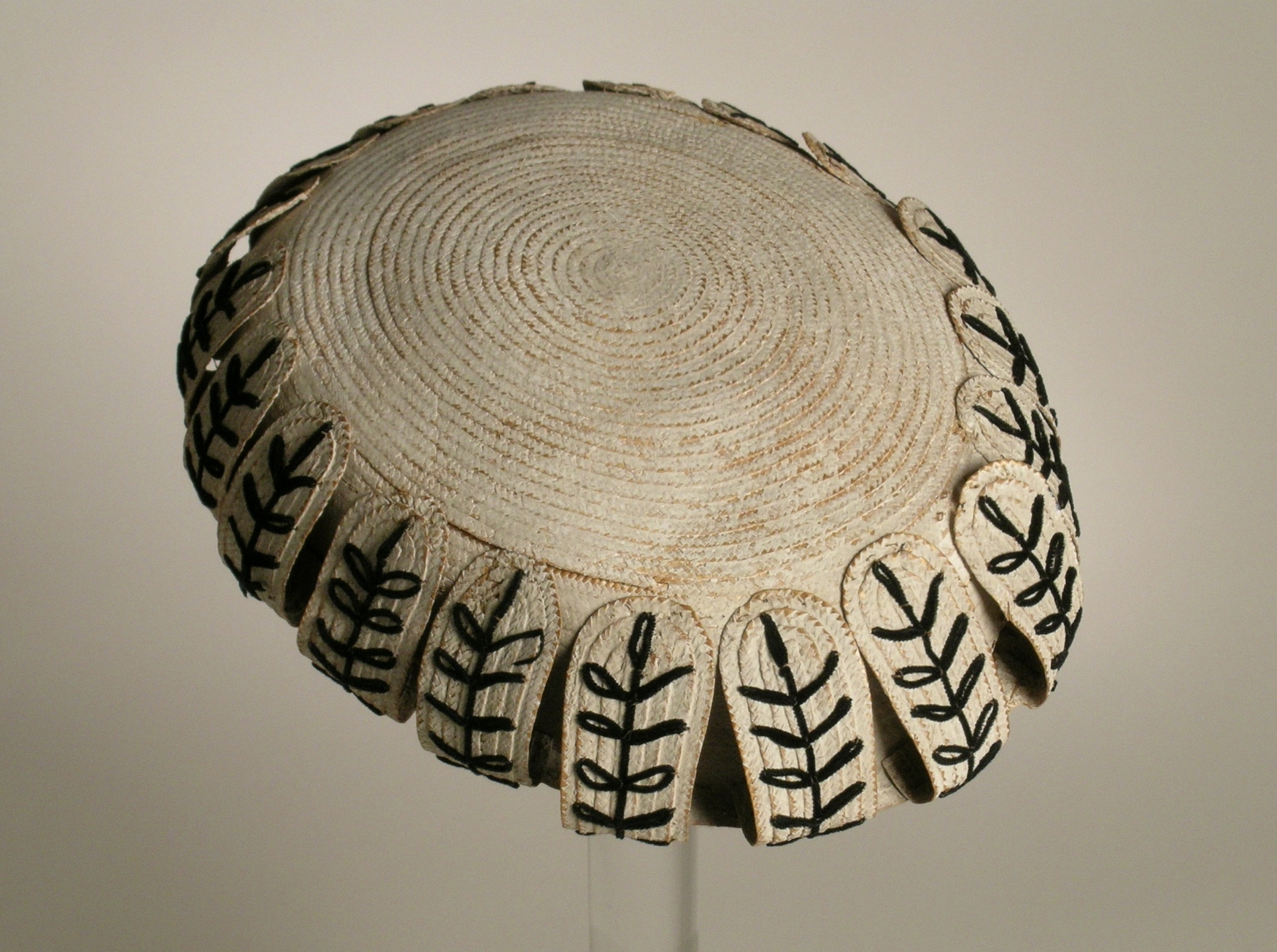
Woman's toque from England, c. 1860 at the collection of Los Angeles County Museum of Art

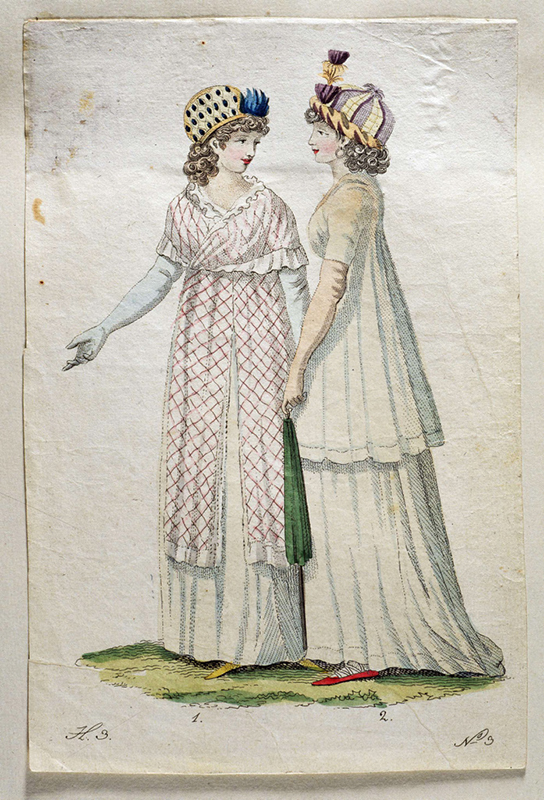
Young ladies wearing toques in a fashion drawing from 1800.

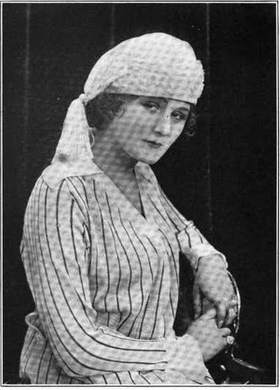
Tasseled toque from 1917 New York.

The word toque has been known in English since around 1500. It is a loan word from the French tuque (15th century), presumably by the way of the Spanish toca 'woman's headdress', from Arabic *taqa طاقة, itself from Old Persian taq 'veil, shawl'.

The word toque in Breton means 'hat'. The spelling with ⟨que⟩ is Middle Breton, and the Modern Breton spelling is tok. Old Breton spells the word toc. The word was borrowed into the French language for both the chef's uniform and the knit cap.

== History and uses ==
A tall, black toque made of silk or velvet, often ornamented with an aigrette, was fashionable among the Spanish nobility during the 1500s. This style is seen in a 1584 portrait of Isabella Clara Eugenia as well as Sofonisba Anguissola's 1573 portrait of Philip II of Spain, both in the Museo del Prado. The style spread across Europe, being adopted in France, England, Germany, and Italy. The toque diminished in popularity in the 1600s as wide-brimmed and cocked hats became fashionable, but reappeared as a predominantly young women's fashion in the 1800s, accompanying long dresses and chignon hairstyles.

=== Culinary ===
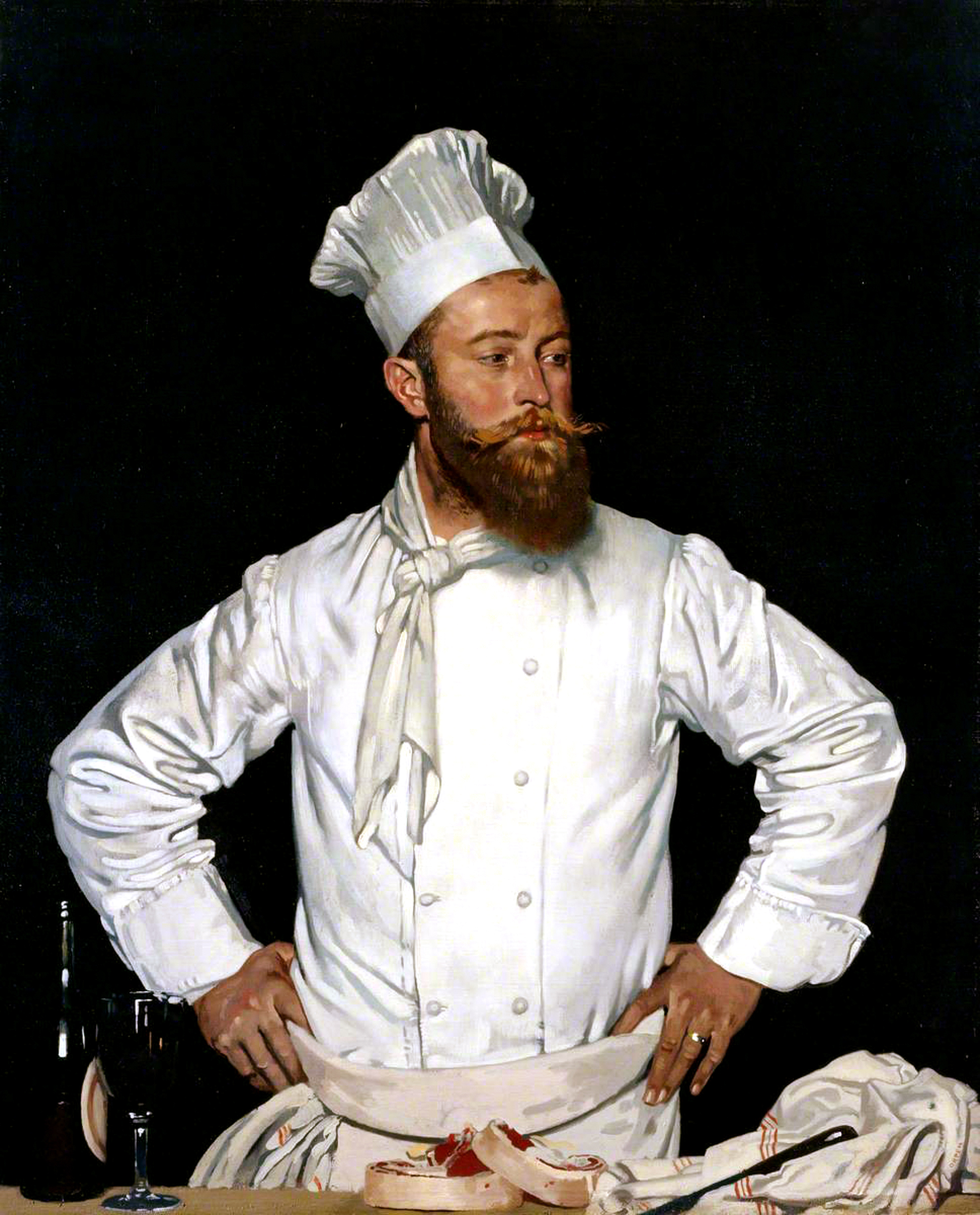
Le Chef de l'Hôtel Chatham, Paris (c. 1921), oil on canvas by William Orpen

A toque blanche (French for 'white hat'), often shortened to toque, is a tall, round, pleated, starched white hat worn by chefs.

The toque most likely originated as the result of the gradual evolution of head coverings worn by cooks throughout the centuries. Their roots are sometimes traced to the casque à meche (stocking cap) worn by 18th-century French chefs. The colour of the casque à meche denoted the rank of the wearer. Boucher, the personal chef of the French statesman Talleyrand, was the first to insist on white toques for sanitary reasons.

The modern toque is popularly believed to have originated with the French chef Marie-Antoine Carême (1784–1833), who stiffened the casque à meche with cardboard.

=== Judicial ===
- A toque, or sometimes touge, was the traditional headgear of various French magistrates.
- A low type in black velvet, called mortier (also rendered in English as mortarboard), was used by the président à mortier, president of a parlement (the royal highest court in a French province), and of the members of two of the highest central courts, cour de cassation and cour des comptes.
- A red toque is sometimes worn by German judges, primarily by justices on the Federal Constitutional Court.

=== Academic ===
The pleated, low, round hat worn in French universities – the equivalent of the mortarboard or tam at British and American universities – is also called a toque.

=== Heraldic ===
In the Napoleonic era, the French first empire replaced the coronets of traditional ("royal") heraldry with a rigorously standardized system (as other respects of "Napoleonic" coats of arms) of toques, reflecting the rank of the bearer. Thus a Napoleonic duke used a toque with seven ostrich feathers and three lambrequins, a count a toque with five feathers and two lambrequins, a baron three feathers and one lambrequin, a knight only one ostrich feather (see Nobility of the First French Empire).

=== Athletic ===
Toque is also used for a hard-type hat or helmet, worn for riding, especially in equestrian sports, often black and covered with black velvet.

== Knit cap ==
In Canada, toque or tuque /tuːk/ is the common name for a knitted winter cap. While the spelling toque has become the most formally accepted in Canada, as recognized by the Canadian Oxford Dictionary and the Dictionary of Canadianisms on Historical Principles, the alternate spelling of tuque is most commonly used in French Canada and often occurs in Canadian media. The spelling touque, although not recognized by the Canadian Oxford Dictionary, is also sometimes seen in written English.

In 2013, CBC Edmonton launched a poll to ask viewers how they spelled the word. The options given were toque, tuque or touque. Nearly 6,500 people voted, with Edmontonians remaining divided on the issue. Though touque was voted most popular in that instance, there is almost no formal usage to support its popularity.

The Canadian English term was borrowed from Canadian French word tuque, and first documented in Canadian English in that form in 1865; by 1880 the spelling toque is documented. The fashion is said to have originated with the coureurs de bois, French and Métis fur traders, who kept their woollen nightcaps on for warmth during cold winter days. This spelling is attributed to a number of different sources, one being the Breton toc or tok, "meaning simply 'hat'"; another suggesting that it is a Francization of the Spanish tocar, to touch, as the long "end of the sock cap" of the Voyageurs hung down and touched their shoulders; and another source adamant that the word is borrowed from "the old Languedoc dialect word tuc" meaning "summit" or "the head of a mountain".

The spelling of toque, on the other hand, is borrowed from the original usage as described elsewhere in this article. Toque also appears in the 1941 Dictionary of Mississippi Valley French as a "style of hair-dressing among the Indians" which was a tall, conical fashion not unlike the shape of the Voyageur-style cap described above.

Dictionaries are divided on the matter of spelling, with the Gage Canadian preferring toque and the Nelson Canadian listing tuque (the Nelson Gage of a few years later would settle on toque). The first Dictionary of Canadianisms on Historical Principles lists separate entries and definitions for both toque and tuque which cross-reference each other, though an illustrative line drawing is presented with the latter. Perhaps most importantly, the Canadian Oxford chose toque, and as the Canadian Press Stylebook bows to the Canadian Oxford as the final word in spelling, most Canadian publications have followed suit.

Though the requirement of the toque to have a pom-pom or no can be a hard line for some Canadians, for the most part the country agrees: one of these three spellings must be "correct" no matter what the specifics of shape. As the Canadian Encyclopedia claims, "We all know a tuque when we see one, [we just] can't agree on how to spell the word."

In recent years knit toques have resurfaced as a popular fashion item. They are used by some all year round, and may be seen not only used outdoors for weather but as an indoor fashion accessory.

Such hats are known in other English-speaking countries by a variety of names, including beanie, watch cap or stocking cap; the terms toque and tuque are unique to Canada and northern areas of the United States close to the Canada–United States border.

== See also ==
- List of hat styles
- List of headgear

Similar hats

- Capotain
- Fez (hat)
- Kalimavkion
- Kofia (hat)
- Kolpik
- Kufi
- Skufia
- Smoking cap
- Tam
- Taqiyah (cap)
