= Tam cap =

Type of women's hat

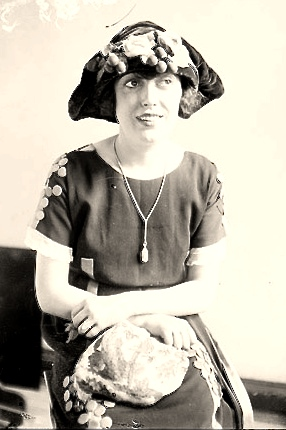
Mabel Normand wearing a tam design in 1921

The tam is a millinery design for women based on the tam o' shanter military cap and the beret. Sometimes it is also known as a tam cap or the traditional term tam o'shanter might also be used. The tam became popular in the early 1920s, when it followed the prevailing trends for closer-fitting hats that suited shorter hairstyles and for borrowing from men's fashion; other traditional men's hats that rose to popularity in women's fashion during this period included the top hat and bowler.

== History ==
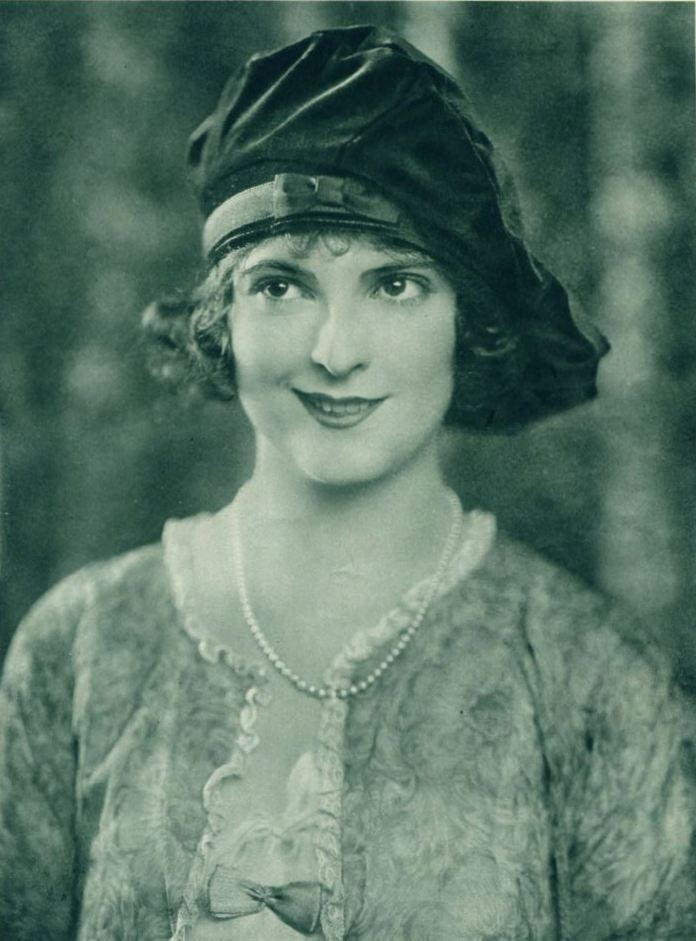
Priscilla Dean wearing a tam with side draping

The tam has a draped design that comes in a variety of shapes and fabrics. Often it had a stiffened and close-fitting inner cap, over which fabric could be draped in a variety of ways.

Along with other headgear formerly reserved for men – including the top hat and bowler – it was popular by the 1920s, suiting the fashion for shorter hairstyles. A 1920 article in The Guardian described the prevalence of closer fitting designs based on the tam' o shanter in combination with more ornate blouses and neater hairstyles, noting: "Since the majority of blouses follow Greek or quasi-Greek lines, it is natural for the hat worn with them to follow also the Greek type of headgear". The article noted that its versatility was another reason for current popularity: "it can be twisted and folded into the close-fitting shapes that are so remarkably becoming...it lends itself admirably to...all kinds of embroidery or needlework stitched apparently at random over it".

A year later, The Guardian reported that the tam was: "dominating the small-hat system" in women's fashion. Describing this ubiquitous millinery design in more detail, it added: "Nor are the present tams by any means tam-like in shape. They are elongated or heightened or squared or triangularised...The tam is merely a sort of envelope which can be pulled about over an under-structure, the shape of which is all important". The article went on to provide tips on how to create a tam successfully at home, advising the creation of a small peak or small brim on the inner cap to create a more becoming effect.

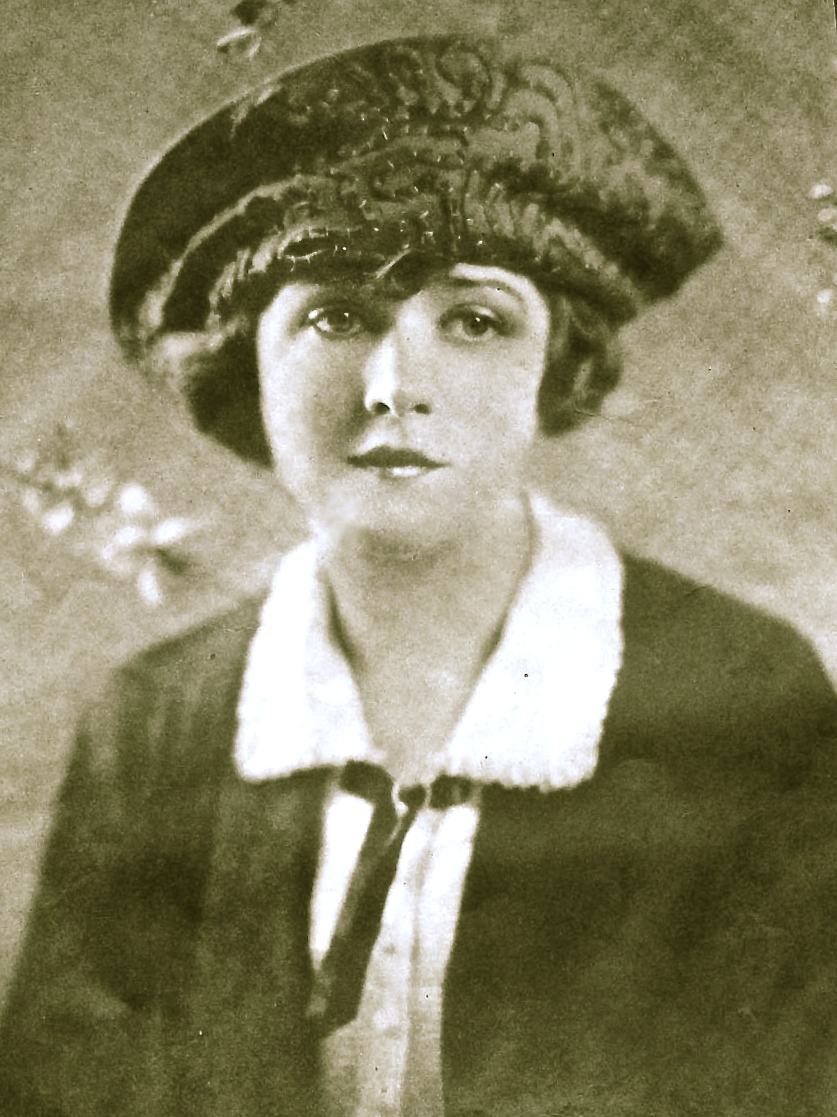
Trimmings included appliqué, as with this ornate design worn by Katherine MacDonald

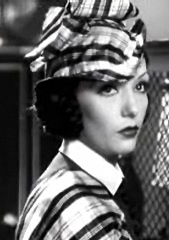
Lupe Vélez in co-ordinated outfit and tam for the 1934 film Laughing Boy

=== Fabrics and variations ===
The tam can be made in a variety of fabrics, but typically drapeable materials such as felt, velvet, or silk have been used. Trimmings might include embroidery or appliqué or it might have the addition of a buckle or brooch. Tassels and feathers were sometimes added. Some varieties might also be made of fur, or have a fur brim.

By the late 1920s, less voluminous versions – similar in design to a toque – were in fashion in materials such as velour, a correspondent for The Times noted, adding that these simple hats were generally worn with ornate dresses.

By the early 1930s, there was a revival of the tam in checks and plaids, alongside the fez and cloche-brimmed designs. In the same year, new macramé (knotted form of weave similar to crochet) designs appeared, some being worn with matching collar and cuffs.

Tam designs continued to be fashionable throughout the 1930s; The Times highlighted an outfit for Royal Ascot in 1938 comprising dress and bolero jacket with matching black velvet tam with high corners in the style of a mortar board hat.

In the British Isles, the tam cap is often used as a headcovering by Christian women during church services.

== Graduation tam ==
A graduation tam is a soft velvet cap used as an academic cap for doctors by some institutions in North America in place of the velvet mortarboard mandated by the intercollegiate costume code. It is normally made of black velvet with a gold tassel and can have four, six or eight sides. Master's tams have been created by some manufactures, with black tassels rather than gold, which has been called "an unfortunate development.

Academic tams came into use by male faculty with doctorates around the 1930s, after female faculty started wearing soft square "Erasmus" caps similar to the soft cap worn by ladies in place of mortarboards at the University of Oxford. The academic tam is thought to be related to the round Tudor bonnet used for some doctoral degrees (traditionally those in the "lay" faculties of law and medicine rather than arts or divinity) in English universities.

== See also ==
- List of hat styles
- Cloche hat
- Beret
