= Le Chef de l'Hôtel Chatham, Paris =

Painting by William Orpen

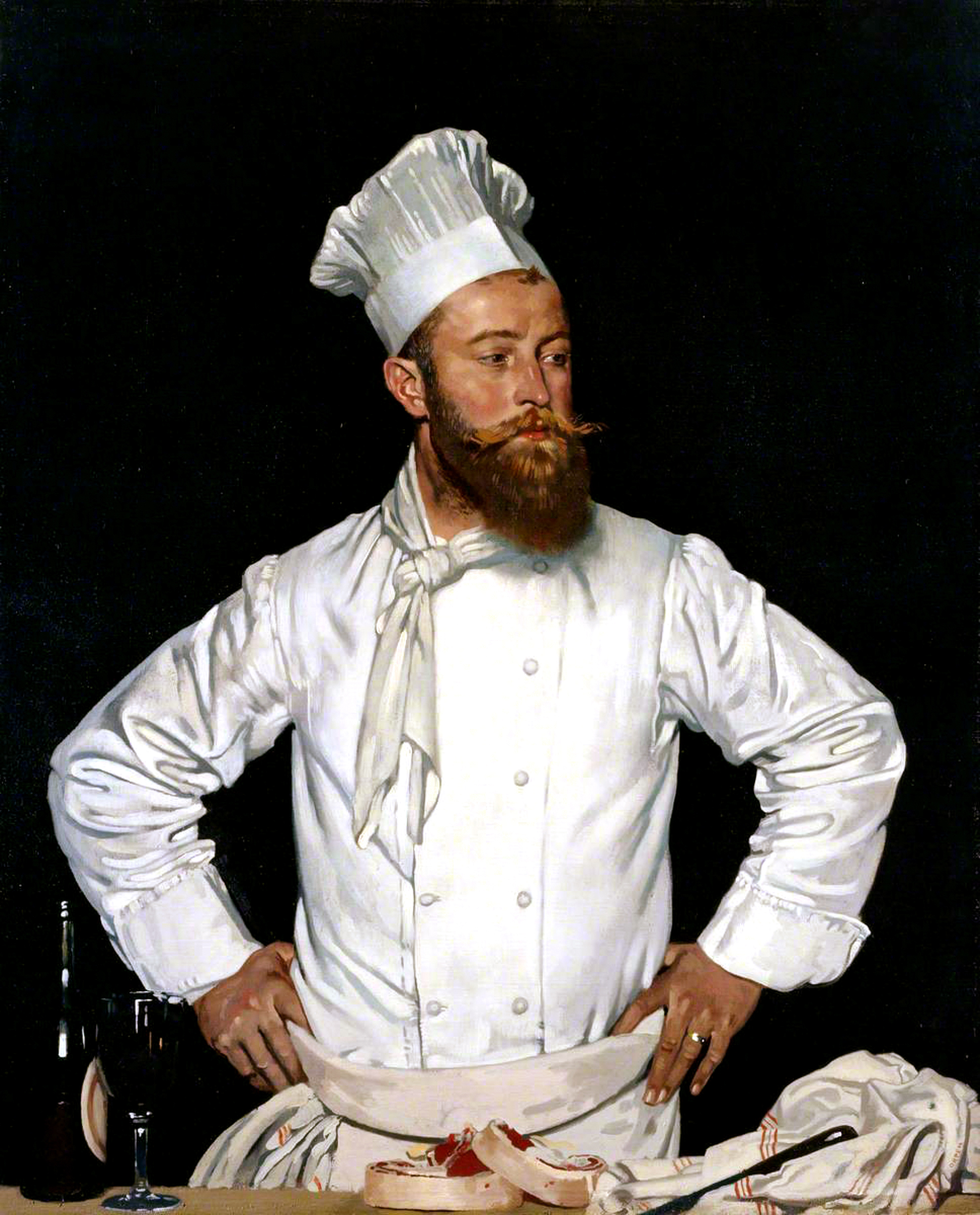
- Artist: William Orpen
- Year: 1921
- Type: Oil on canvas, portrait painting
- Dimensions: 127 cm × 102.5 cm (50 in × 40.4 in)
- Location: Royal Academy, London

Le Chef de l'Hôtel Chatham, Paris is a 1921 oil painting by the Anglo-Irish artist William Orpen. It is a portrait it depicts Eugene Grossrieter, a chef at the Hôtel Chatham in Paris. He is depicted in the traditional Chef's uniform with some meat chops and a bottle and glass of red wine. Orpen emphasises the crispness of his white costume against a dark background. Influenced by the Spanish Old Master Diego Velázquez, Orpen used the swagger historically used to depict nobleman but chose to show a working man.

The painting was displayed at the Royal Academy Exhibition of 1921 held at Burlington House in London. Well-received, it was initially intended to be purchased for the nation as part of the Chantrey bequest. However it was ruled to be ineligible due to having been produced outside of Britain in Paris. Instead, having been elected to full membership of the Royal Academy of Arts, he presented it as his diploma work the same year.

== See also ==
- List of paintings by William Orpen

== Bibliography ==
- McConkey, Kenneth. Edwardian Portraits: Images of an Age of Opulence. Antique Collectors' Club, 1987.
- Upstone, Robert & Jenkins, David Fraser. William Orpen: Politics, Sex & Death. Philip Wilson, 2005.
