= Arthur Lee (British Army officer) =

British Army officer (1877–1954)

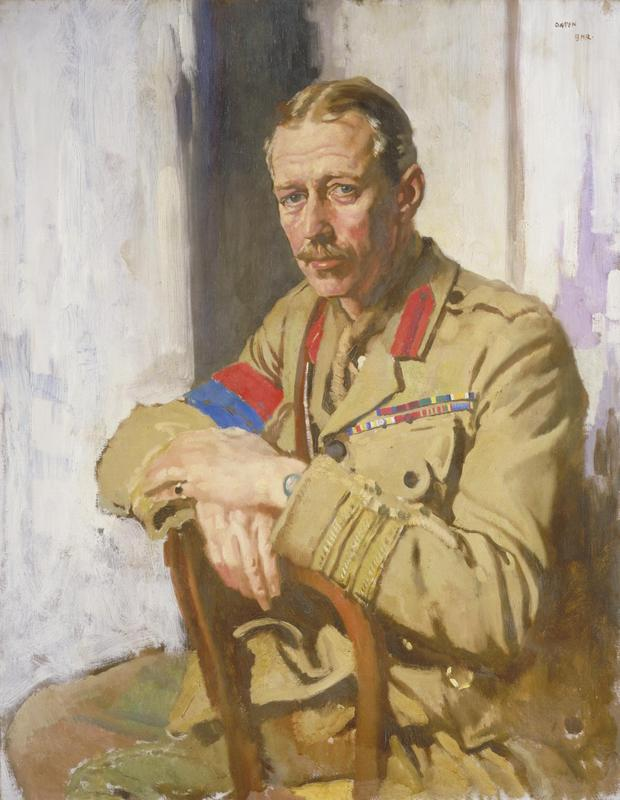
1919 portrait of Lee by William Orpen

Lieutenant-Colonel Arthur N. Lee, DSO, OBE (August 1877 – October 1954) was a British Army officer who served in World War I. During the conflict, he served as the military censor of works by official British war artists in France from 1916 to 1918.

== Life ==
Lee was born in Southwell, Nottinghamshire and attended Trinity College, Cambridge, graduating in 1899 and subsequently qualified as a solicitor before becoming a director of the Sheffield cutlery manufacturers Walker & Hall. He was a territorial officer with the Sherwood Foresters from 1903 and on the outbreak of World War I was mobilised with his regiment and sent to the Western Front. In 1916 he was a major in Dublin where the Sherwood Foresters suffered heavy losses during the Easter Rising and was awarded the Distinguished Service Order. He was then transferred to the headquarters of the British Expeditionary Force as a lieutenant colonel where he was appointed military censor. He had several well-recorded disputes with war artists, particularly William Orpen and Christopher Nevinson whose Paths of Glory Lee attempted to censor. Nevinson, however, still exhibited the work at a London exhibition in 1918 with a piece of brown paper across it bearing the word "Censored". Lee was made a member of the Order of the British Empire for his war work.

After the war, Lee returned to Sheffield and his cutlery firm. In 1932 he served as Master Cutler of the Company of Cutlers. Lee, who had become a friend of William Orpen continued the friendship until Orpen's death in 1931 and was responsible for commissioning Orpen to paint the Prince of Wales in 1923 on behalf of The Royal and Ancient Golf Club of St Andrews of which Lee was a committee member. Lee's personal papers were donated to the Imperial War Museum after his death by his son Peter, who served as an intelligence officer during World War II.
