= William Orpen =

Irish artist (1878–1931)

Sir William Orpen KBE RA RHA
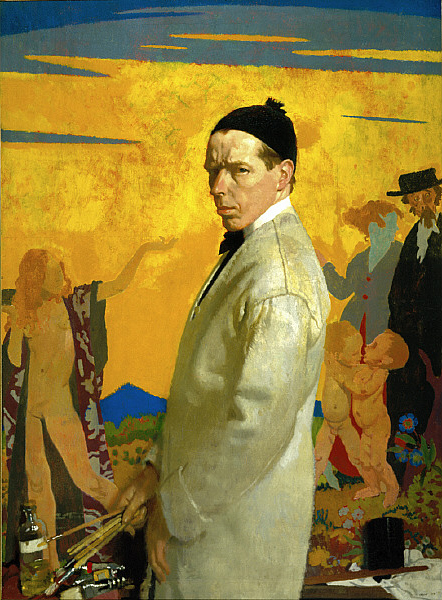
- Sowing New Seed, a 1913 self-portrait by Orpen
- Born: 27 November 1878; Stillorgan, County Dublin
- Died: 29 September 1931 (aged 52); London, England
- Resting place: Putney Vale Cemetery
- Education: National College of Art and Design; Slade School of Fine Art
- Known for: Portrait painting Military art
- Awards: KBE
- Website: Official Website

Major Sir William Newenham Montague Orpen KBE RA RHA (27 November 1878 – 29 September 1931) was an Irish artist who mainly worked in London. Orpen was a fine draughtsman and a popular, commercially successful painter of portraits for the well-to-do in Edwardian society, though many of his most striking paintings are self-portraits.

During World War I, he was the most prolific of the official war artists sent by Britain to the Western Front. There he produced drawings and paintings of ordinary soldiers, dead men, and German prisoners of war, as well as portraits of generals and politicians. Most of these works, 138 in all, he donated to the British government; they are now in the collection of the Imperial War Museum. His connections to the senior ranks of the British Army allowed him to stay in France longer than any of the other official war artists, and although he was made a Knight Commander of the Order of the British Empire in the 1918 Birthday Honours, and also elected a member of the Royal Academy of Arts, his determination to serve as a war artist cost him both his health and his social standing in Britain.

After his early death a number of critics, including other artists, were loudly dismissive of Orpen's work, and for many years his paintings were rarely exhibited, a situation that only began to change in the 1980s.

== Biography ==
=== Early life ===
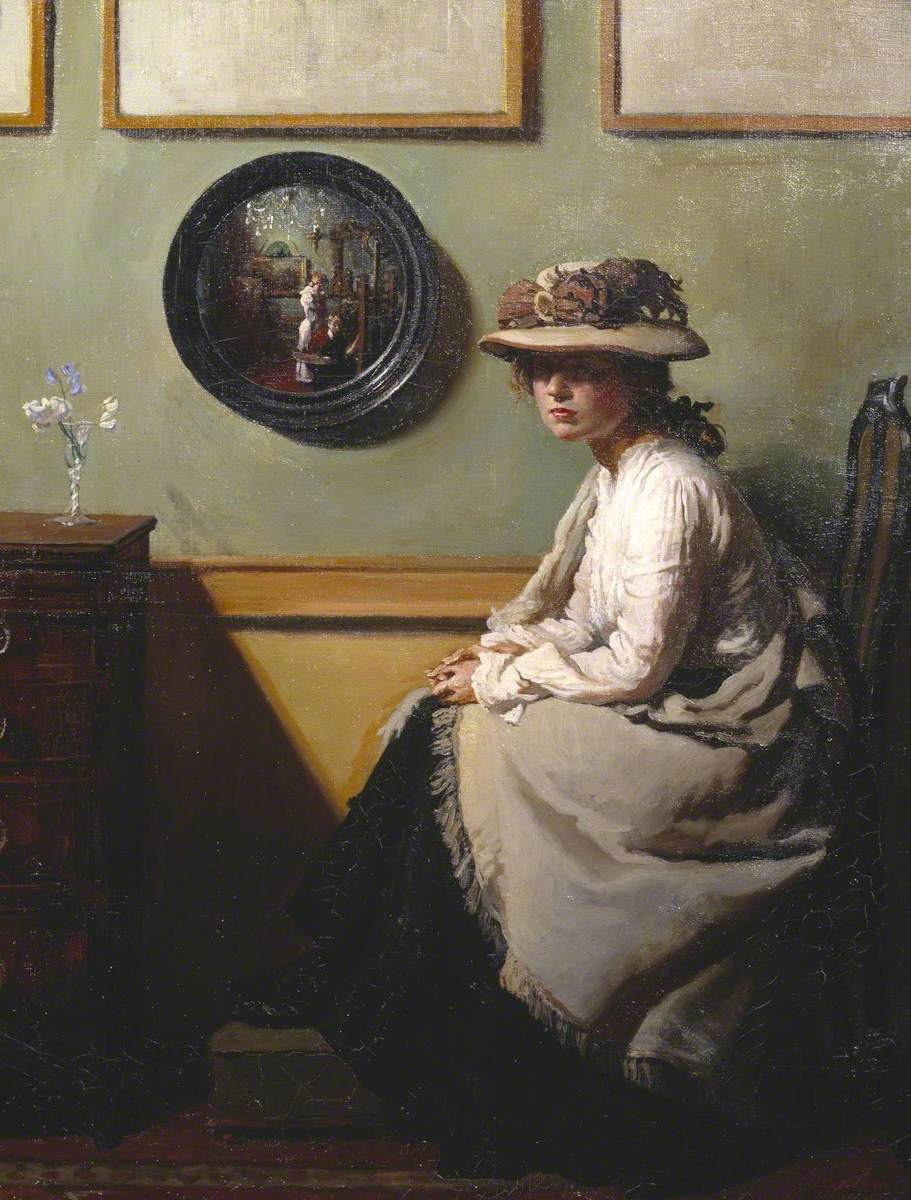
The Mirror (1900) (Tate)

Born in Stillorgan, County Dublin, William Orpen was the fourth and youngest son of Arthur Herbert Orpen (1830–1926), a solicitor, and his wife, Anne Caulfield (1834–1912), the eldest daughter of the Right Rev. Charles Caulfield (1804–1862), the Bishop of Nassau. Both his parents were amateur painters, and his eldest brother, Richard Caulfield Orpen, became a notable architect. His nieces were Bea Orpen and Kathleen Delap. The historian Goddard Henry Orpen was his second cousin. The family lived at 'Oriel', a large house with extensive grounds containing stables and a tennis court. Orpen appears to have had a happy childhood there.

Orpen was a naturally talented painter, and six weeks before his thirteenth birthday was enrolled at the Dublin Metropolitan School of Art. During his six years at the college, he won every major prize there, plus the British Isles gold medal for life drawing, before leaving to study at the Slade School of Art between 1897 and 1899. At the Slade he mastered oil painting and began to experiment with different painting techniques and effects. Orpen would include mirrors in his pictures to create images within images, add false frames and collages around his subjects, and often make pictorial references to works by other artists in his own paintings. His two-metre-wide painting The Play Scene from Hamlet won the Slade composition prize in 1899. His teachers at the Slade included Henry Tonks, Philip Wilson Steer and Frederick Brown, all of whom were members of the New English Art Club; they ensured he exhibited there in 1899, and that he became a member in 1900. Orpen's The Mirror, shown at the NEAC in 1900, references both Jan van Eyck's Arnolfini Portrait of 1434 and also elements of seventeenth-century Dutch interiors, such as muted tones and deep shadows. Orpen depicted the 'Arnolfini' convex glass in several other paintings, including A Mere Fracture in 1901, during this period. Also in 1901, he held a solo exhibition at the Carfax Gallery in central London.

Whilst at the Slade, he became engaged to Emily Scobel, a model and the subject of The Mirror. She ended their relationship in 1901, and Orpen married Grace Knewstub, the sister-in-law of Sir William Rothenstein. Orpen and Knewstub had three daughters together, but the marriage was not a happy one; by 1908, Orpen had begun a long-running affair with Mrs Evelyn Saint-George, a well-connected American millionairess based in London, with whom he also had a child.

=== Early career ===
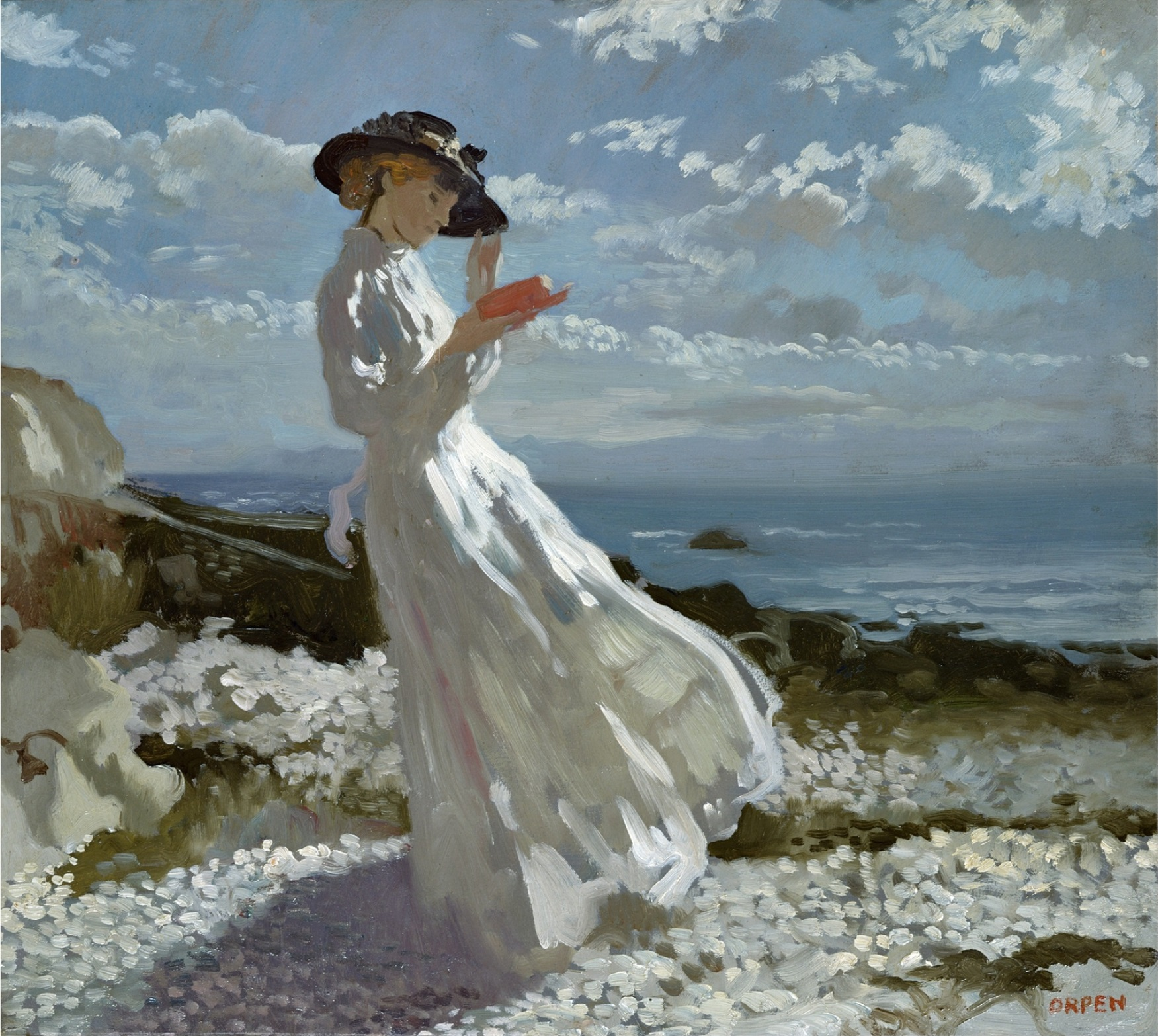
Grace reading at Howth Bay (c.1908-1912)

After he left the Slade, from 1903 to 1907, Orpen ran a private teaching studio, the Chelsea Art School, at Rossetti Mansions near the King's Road with his fellow Slade graduate Augustus John. Between 1902 and 1915, Orpen divided his time between London and Dublin. He taught at the Dublin Metropolitan School of Art, and his teaching influenced a generation of young Irish artists. His pupils included Seán Keating, Grace Gifford, Patrick Tuohy, Leo Whelan and Margaret Clarke. This was the period of the Celtic revival in Ireland and, responding to the growth of new literary and other cultural developments, Orpen painted three large allegorical paintings: Sowing New Seed, The Western Wedding and The Holy Well. A key figure in the Celtic Revival was Hugh Lane, who was a friend and mentor to Orpen, and who begin collecting impressionist art works with Orpen's guidance. In the summer of 1904 Orpen and Lane visited Paris and Madrid together, and some years later Lane commissioned a series of portraits of contemporary Irish figures from Orpen for the Municipal Gallery of Modern Art in Dublin. From 1908 onwards, Orpen exhibited works in the Royal Academy on a regular basis. Between 1908 and 1912, Orpen and his family spent the summer on the coast at Howth, north of Dublin, where he began painting in the open air and developed a distinctive plein-air style that featured figures composed of touches of colour without a drawn outline. The most notable of these works was Midday on the Beach, shown at the NEAC in 1910.

Between 1911 and 1913, in London, Orpen painted a series of portraits, mostly three-quarter-length, of Vera Brewster, the wife of the writer Joe Horne. These included the paintings The Roscommon Dragoon, The Irish Volunteer and The Angler. John Singer Sargent promoted Orpen's work and he soon built a lucrative reputation, in both London and Dublin, for painting society portraits. Mrs St. George, (1912), and Lady Rocksavage (1913), both demonstrate Orpen's ability to produce the swagger portraits that Edwardian high society greatly valued. Group portraits of a type known as conversation pieces were also hugely popular and Orpen painted several, most notably The Cafe Royal in London (1912), and Homage to Manet (1909), which showed Walter Sickert and several other artists and critics seated in front of Édouard Manet's Portrait of Eva Gonzalies. Orpen had worked on Homage to Manet since 1906 at his studio in South Bolton Gardens in Chelsea, where Lane also had rooms. By the start of World War I, Orpen was the most famous and most commercially successful artist working in Britain.

=== World War One ===
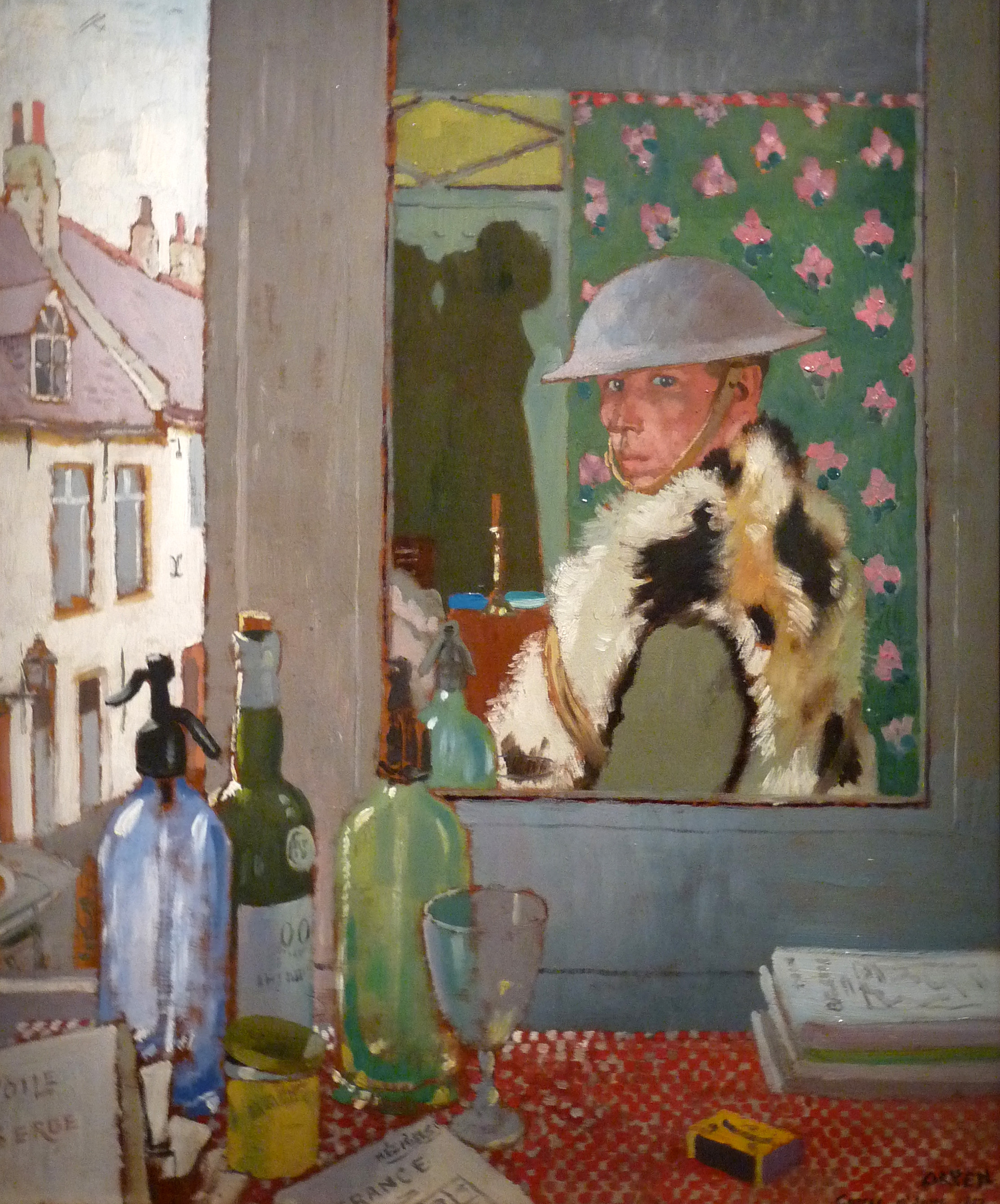
Ready to Start (1917)

At the start of World War One, a number of Irish people living in England returned to Ireland to avoid conscription. Among them was Orpen's studio assistant and former pupil, Seán Keating. Keating encouraged Orpen to do likewise, but he refused and committed himself to supporting the British war effort. In December 1915 Orpen was commissioned into the British Army's Army Service Corps and reported for clerical duty at London's Kensington Barracks in March 1916. Throughout 1916 Orpen continued painting portraits, most notably one of a despondent Winston Churchill, but soon started using both his own contacts and those of Evelyn Saint-George, to secure a war artist posting. Orpen knew both Philip Sassoon, the private secretary to Sir Douglas Haig, and also Sir John Cowans, then serving as Quartermaster-General to the Forces. In January 1917, the Daily Mirror reported that Haig himself had "conferred" on Orpen the title of an official artist with the British Army in France. The Department of Information, who were actually running the British war artist scheme, were given little choice but to accept the situation. While the other artists on the Department scheme remained at the honorary rank of second lieutenant and were restricted to three weeks visiting the Western Front, Orpen was promoted to Major and given indefinite permission to remain at the Front. An officer from Kensington Barracks was appointed as his military aide, a car and driver were made available in France and Orpen paid for a batman and assistant to accompany him.

In April 1917, Orpen travelled to the Somme and based himself in Amiens. Orpen had arrived on the Somme three weeks after the German forces had pulled back to the Hindenburg Line. Each day Orpen would be driven to locations such as Thiepval, Beaumont-Hamel or Ovillers-la-Boisselle to sketch Allied troops or German prisoners and record the devastation left by the Battle of the Somme amid the frozen and desolate landscape. However he did not submit any work to the Department of Information nor to the military censor. When he was reprimanded for that, he had Haig's office move the officer who had issued the reprimand to other duties. In May 1917, he painted portraits of both Haig and Sir Hugh Trenchard, the commander of the Royal Flying Corps, and both of these images were widely reproduced in British newspapers and magazines. In June Orpen moved to the Ypres Salient and stayed at Cassel in the Hotel Sauvage, where he painted the self-portrait known as Ready to Start.

==== The Somme battlefield ====
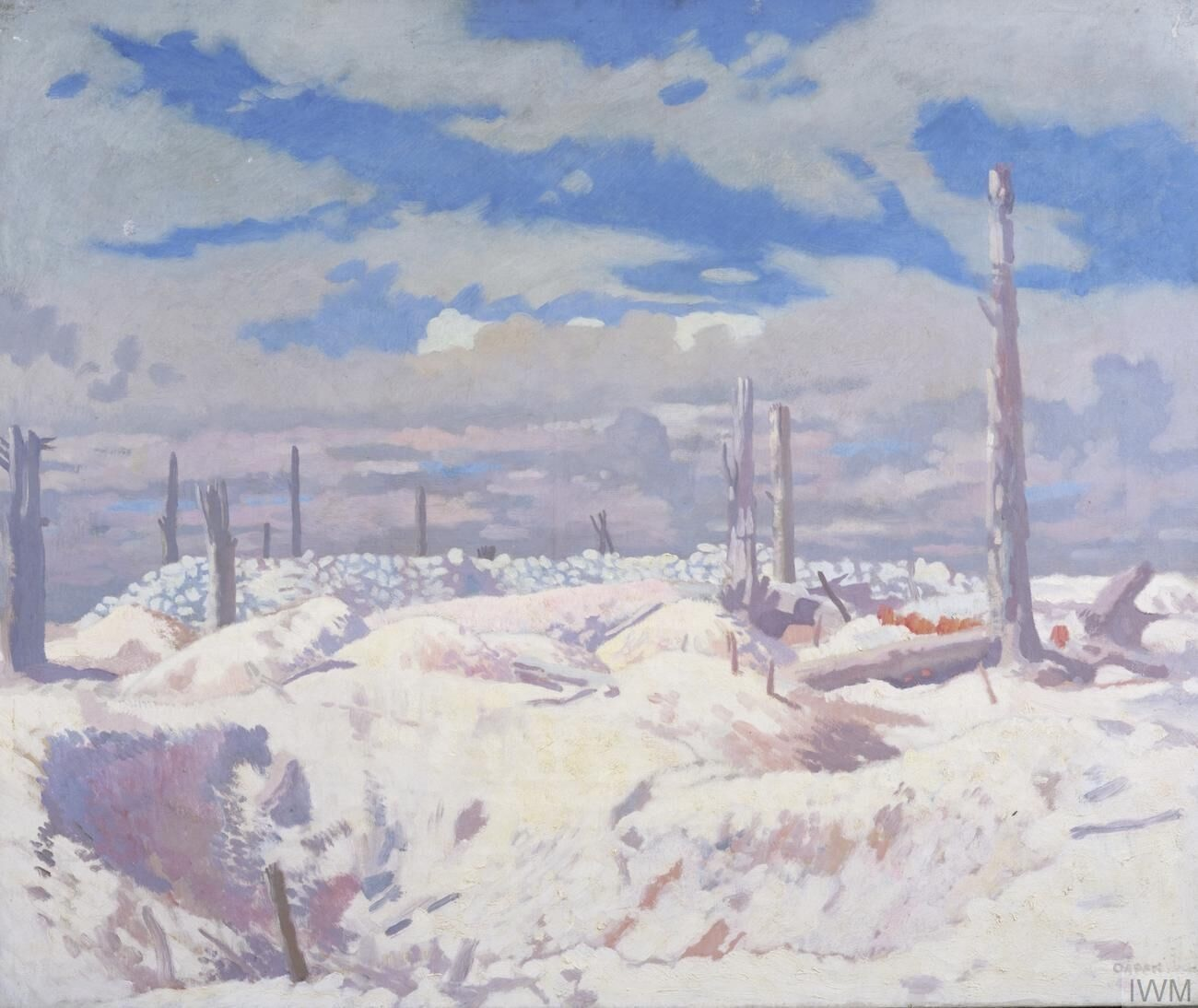
The Schwaben Redoubt (1917)

Orpen returned to the Somme in August 1917 and found the landscape transformed. Writing in 1921, he described the scene:

I had left it mud, nothing but water, shell-holes and mud – the most gloomy dreary abomination of desolation the mind could imagine; and now, in the summer of 1917, no words could express the beauty of it. The dreary, dismal mud was baked white and pure – dazzling white. White daisies, red poppies and a blue flower, great masses of them, stretched for miles and miles. The sky a pure dark blue, and the whole air, up to a height of about forty feet, thick with white butterflies: your clothes were covered with butterflies. It was like an enchanted land: but in the place of fairies there were thousands of little white crosses, marked 'Unknown British Soldier', for the most part.

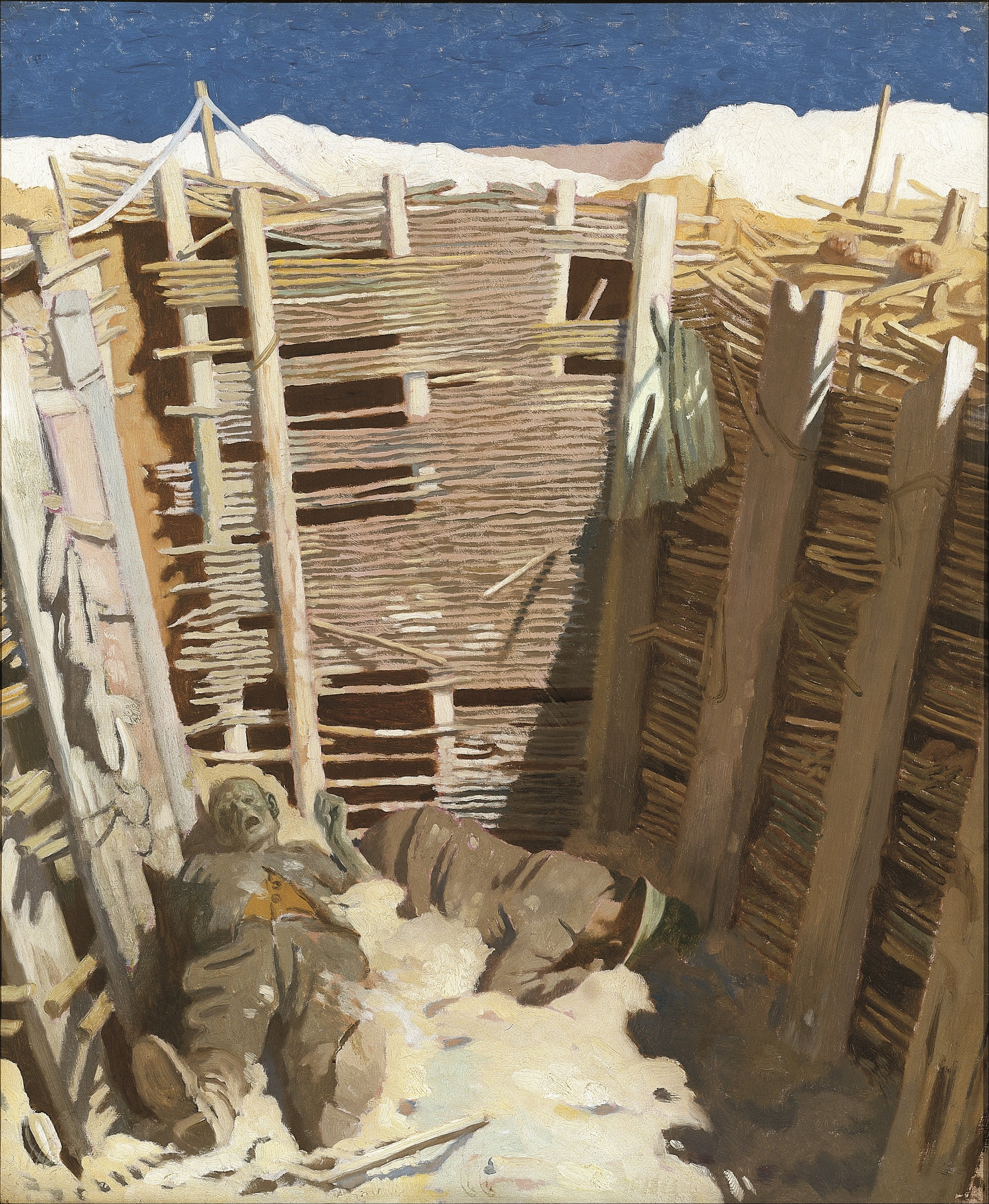
Dead Germans in a Trench (1918)

Orpen was well aware that this landscape was a vast graveyard. Throughout the summer of 1917, other than Orpen and his driver and assistant, the only people on the empty battlefield around Thiepval were the British and Allied burial parties working to identify and inter the thousands of bodies left in the open or in abandoned trenches and dugouts. As he travelled across this landscape Orpen frequently encountered dead bodies and human remains, often little more, he wrote, than "skulls, bones, garments". On the Somme, Orpen pushed himself to find artistic and pictorial strategies adequate to the situation. He stopped using half-tones and half-shades and adopted a new palette of colours, characterised by the extensive use of weak purples, mauves and bright green, with large white spaces representing the effect of bright sunlight on the chalk soil, all under a strong cobalt blue sky.

In Dead Germans in a Trench his use of blue-green for the bodies indicates putrefaction, while the bright colouring of the trench increases the disturbing sense of the picture. Amid the derelict trenches, Orpen claimed to have encountered soldiers who had been traumatised and shell-shocked by the fighting and made, at least, two paintings, A Man with a Cigarette and Blown Up, Mad, based on these meetings.

Others regard the two figures as purely allegorical representations of sacrifice and suffering. In particular, the soldier in Blown Up, Mad has been likened to early Renaissance depictions of the risen Christ emerging from the tomb.

Following the success of his Haig and Trenchard portraits, Orpen was asked to paint portraits of several pilots in the Royal Flying Corps. He spent part of September 1917 visiting airfields and during October 1917 he was based with No. 56 Squadron near Cassel. His portrait of Lieutenant Reginald Hoidge, MC and Bar, was painted a few hours after the young pilot had been in a dogfight and Orpen was greatly impressed by his calmness. Orpen's portrait of Arthur Rhys-Davids, DSO MC, is also crisply drawn with rich colours and lush shadows.

Rhys-Davids was killed in combat within a week of sitting for Orpen, whose portrait of him was used as the cover illustration of the next edition of War Pictorial magazine and widely reproduced elsewhere after that.

==== The Refugee ====
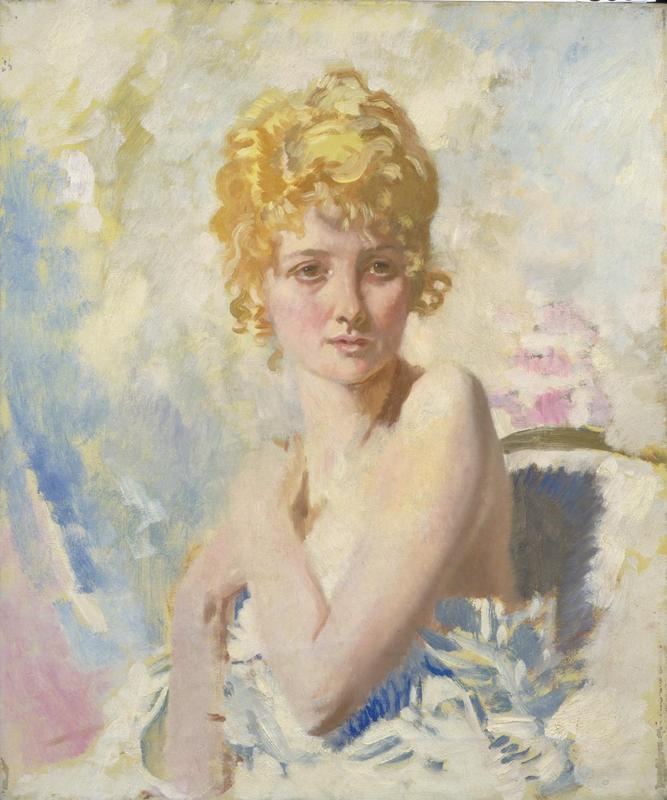
The Refugee (B) (1917), modelled by Yvonne Aubicq

Late in 1917, Orpen spent two weeks in hospital with blood poisoning. There he met a young volunteer Red Cross worker from Lille named Yvonne Aubicq. The two began a relationship that was to last ten years and Orpen painted several portraits of her. Two of these he submitted to the official censor early in 1918. Orpen named both paintings A Spy and in March 1918 was interviewed by Arthur Lee, the military censor responsible for the war artists. Lee made it clear that if the title was intended as a joke it was in very bad taste coming so soon after the execution of Mata Hari but if the subject really was a spy then Orpen could be facing a court-martial. Orpen gave Lee a fantastical story that the woman in the picture was a German spy who had been executed by the French but who, in an attempt to save herself, had at the last moment revealed herself naked in front of the firing squad. Lee had Orpen recalled to London to be reprimanded at the War Office. There, Orpen retracted the firing squad story but was ordered to remain in London. Orpen ignored this and, quite illegally, made his way back to France. There he contrived to receive a phone call from Haig's private office, within earshot of several of Lee's colleagues from Army Intelligence, inviting him to dinner with Haig to discuss what he would like to paint next. Lee dropped his objections to Orpen working in France, and Orpen agreed to rename the two pictures The Refugee.

As the war progressed, Orpen and Lee became good friends; Orpen painted two portraits of him, and they went drinking together in London and maintained a lively correspondence until Orpen's death. It is not clear how well known this friendship was during their lives but if it was known of in Dublin it would have caused consternation and real pain in several quarters. Not only had Lee been the brigade major sent to Dublin to put down the 1916 Easter Rising, but had been the officer in charge of arranging several of the executions that followed the fighting, including that of Joseph Plunkett, the husband of Grace Gifford, Orpen's star pupil from his teaching days. In fact, between joining the British army in 1915 and his death in 1931, Orpen spent only a single day, in 1918, in Ireland.

In May 2010, a third version of The Refugee surfaced on the Antiques Roadshow television programme. The Imperial War Museum had assured its owner that it was a copy by someone other than Orpen, but the programme's art expert, Rupert Maas, determined it was painted by Orpen himself as a 'thank-you' present to Lord Beaverbrook for helping him avoid being court-martialled in March 1918. The picture was estimated to be worth £250,000.

==== Recognition ====
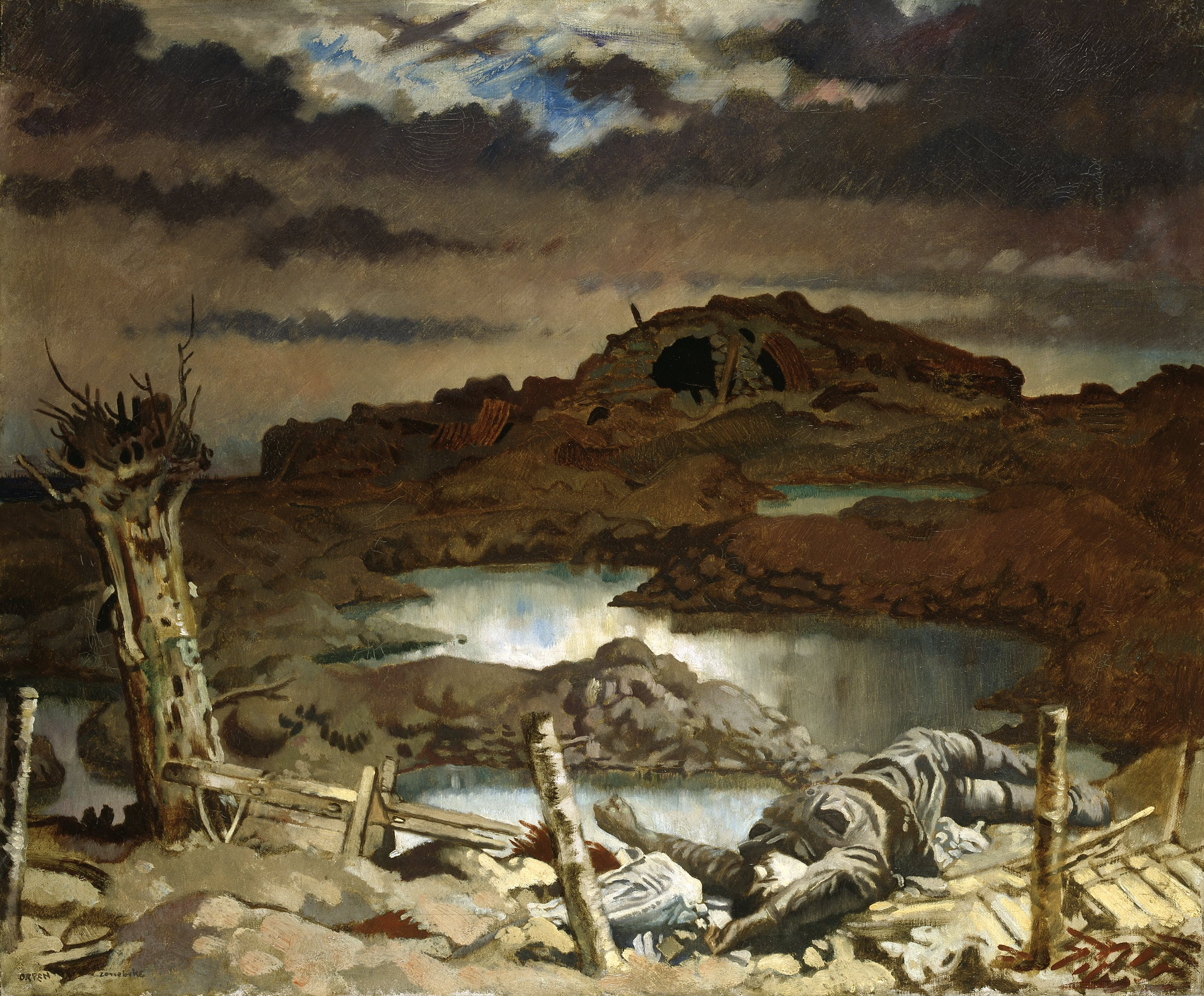
Zonnebeke (1918) (Tate)

In May 1918, 125 of Orpen's war paintings and drawings were displayed at Agnew's Gallery in Old Bond Street in London. The exhibition was a great success with 9000 paying visitors in its four weeks. Highlights of the exhibition included nine of Orpen's 'khaki portraits' and several of his works from the Somme such as Highlander Passing a Grave and Thinker on the Butte de Warlencourt. There was much press discussion as to why the censor had passed Orpen's Dead Germans in a Trench as suitable for display, after his refusal to allow Christopher Nevinson's Paths of Glory to be displayed two months previously. In fact, Lee had refused to pass nearly all of the paintings shown at Agnew's but Orpen appealed to the Director of Military Intelligence, General George Macdonogh, and had him overruled. After Agnew's, several museums and galleries wanted to host the exhibition and it was taken to the Manchester City Art Gallery and then the United States. Whilst the exhibition was in London, it was announced that Orpen was donating all the works on display to the British government on the understanding that they should remain in their white frames and be kept together as a single body of work. They are now in the collection of the Imperial War Museum in London. In the King's 1918 Birthday Honours list that summer he was made a Knight Commander of the Order of the British Empire.

==== 1918 ====
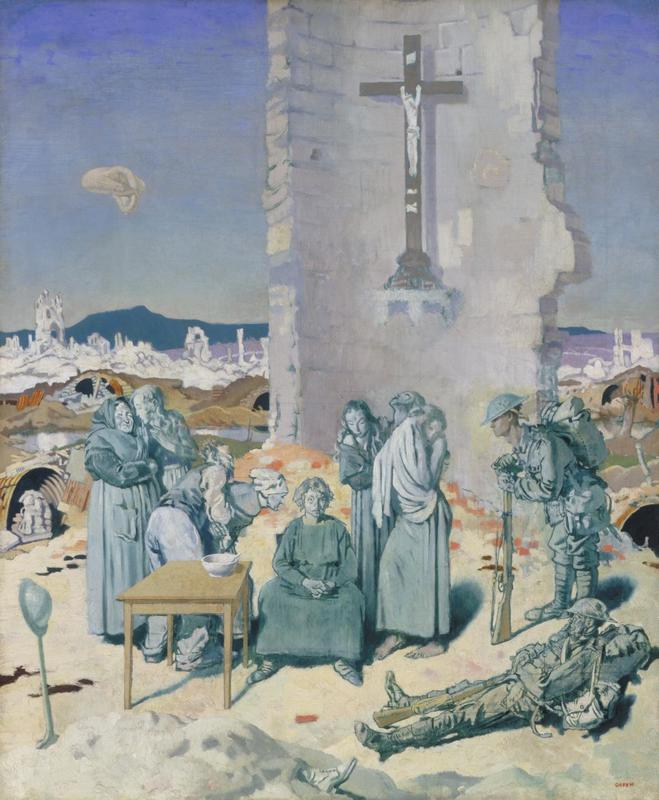
The Mad Woman of Douai (1918)

Orpen returned to France in July and spent a second summer painting on the old Somme battlefield and making frequent trips to Paris to complete a series of portraits of Canadian commanders. Later he painted the immediate aftermath of the fighting at Zonnebeke that had taken place during the Fifth Battle of Ypres. Orpen made it clear he wished to remain in France and was keen to work in the newly liberated towns. By the end of the summer of 1918, Orpen was mentally exhausted and his works became increasingly theatrical, less realistic and more allegorical. In Harvest (1918), which shows women tending a grave covered in barbed wire, he used a garish palette of colours to emphasize the unreal nature of the scene. While Bombing: Night and Adam and Eve at Peronne seem somewhat flawed compositions, other paintings were far more successful. Most notably, The Mad Woman of Douai is a harrowing depiction of the aftermath of a rape. When Orpen met the woman some time afterwards she was 'silent and motionless, except for one thumb which constantly twitched'. The two soldiers in the picture are both figures borrowed from other paintings of his, as is the grave in the foreground. Orpen had been shocked to see a number of such burial mounds with, as he wrote, "arms and feet showing in lots of cases".

As the war entered its final stages Orpen witnessed scenes which he found increasingly macabre. One day, even the broad-minded Orpen was shocked to encounter three young French prostitutes offering their services next to a burial party at a gravesite. Towards the end of the war, he painted a handful of 'parable paintings', such as Armistice Night, Amiens and The Official Entry of the Kaiser, that used black humour to re-imagine the coming victory. Most of these paintings were never displayed in public after the war. In November 1918, Orpen collapsed and became seriously ill. Yvonne Aubicq spent two months nursing him before he moved to Paris in January 1919 to begin work on his next commission.

=== The Peace Conference ===
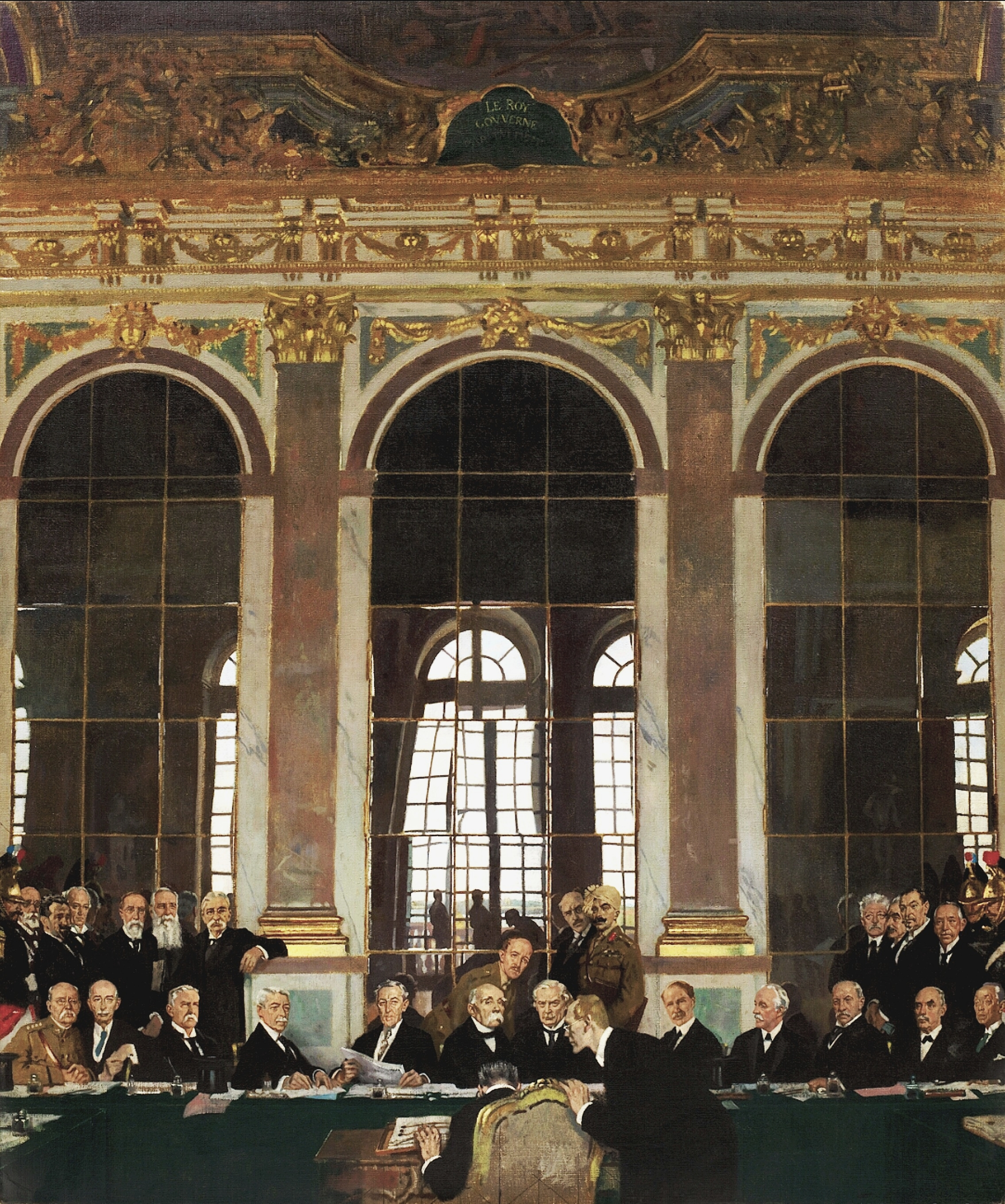
The Signing of Peace in the Hall of Mirrors, Versailles, 28th June 1919 (1919)

When the war ended, the Imperial War Museum commissioned Orpen to stay in France and paint three large group portraits of the delegates to Paris Peace Conference. Throughout 1919 he painted individual portraits of the delegates to the Conference and these formed the basis of his two large paintings, A Peace Conference at the Quai d'Orsay and The Signing of Peace in the Hall of Mirrors. In both pictures, the architecture overwhelms the gathered politicians and statesmen whose political wranglings and vainglory had diminished them in Orpen's eyes.

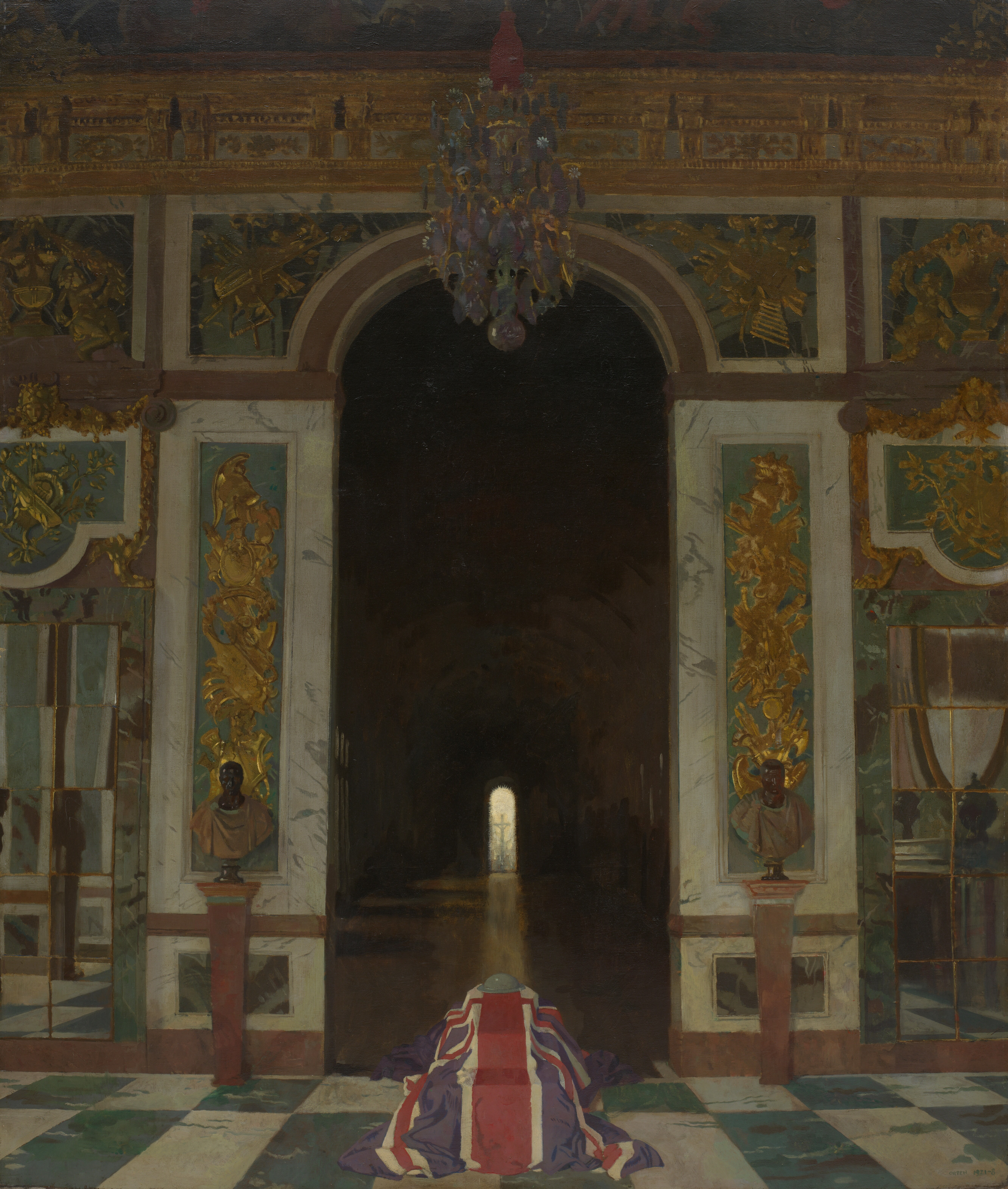
To the Unknown British Soldier in France (1921)

Orpen considered that the whole conference was being conducted with a lack of respect or regard for the suffering of the soldiers who fought in the war, and he attempted to address this in the third painting of the commission. This picture was to show the delegates and military leaders as they entered the Hall of Mirrors to sign the Treaty of Versailles. Orpen sent Evelyn Saint-George a letter detailing the original layout and composition of the work. Haig and Marshal Foch were at the centre with the other delegates on either side of them. Among the delegates, Orpen included two additional figures, a Grenadier Guards sergeant and Arthur Rhys-Davids, the young fighter pilot he had painted the week before he was killed in 1917. After working on this composition for nine months, Orpen painted over all the figures and replaced them with a coffin covered by the Union Jack and flanked by a pair of ghostly and wretched soldiers clothed in rags, actually the figure from the painting Blown Up, Mad, with two cherubs above them supporting garlands of flowers. This painting, now known as To the Unknown British Soldier in France, was first exhibited in 1923 at the Royal Academy. The public voted it picture of the year, but almost all of the critics who reviewed the picture condemned it; and, from a handful of critics and newspapers, Orpen received sustained abuse and was accused of bad taste, technical ineptitude and, for the two figures either side of the coffin, sacrilege. Orpen did receive some letters of appreciation from ex-servicemen and from family members of soldiers who had died in the war, but he still felt the need to issue a statement explaining the picture and his intentions. However, it was clearly not the group portrait the Imperial War Museum had commissioned, and the Museum refused to accept it. The picture remained in Orpen's studio until 1928 when, on his own initiative, he offered to paint out the cherubs and the soldiers if that would make it acceptable to the Museum. The then Director of the IWM replied that he would be happy to accept the picture as it was, or however Orpen wished to present it. Orpen painted out the soldiers and the painting was accepted by the Museum in 1928.

=== Later life ===
After the war, Orpen returned to painting society portraits and enjoyed great commercial success. He was never short of portrait commissions to work on and throughout the 1920s often earned £35,000 per year and could easily charge 2,000 guineas for a picture. Throughout the 1920s he exhibited at the Royal Academy each year and maintained homes and studios in both London and Paris, where he lived with Aubicq.

Orpen continued to drink heavily and although he was separated from his wife, they never divorced. Eventually, he and Aubicq separated and she later married William Grover-Williams, Orpen's former chauffeur. His 1921 Royal Academy submission was a portrait of the head chef at the Hotel Chatham in Paris. The Tate Gallery were keen to acquire the painting using funds from the Chantrey Bequest. After Orpen assured the Tate that the picture met the conditions required by the Bequest and that he had painted the picture entirely in Britain, the Tate announced the purchase. Several people then came forward to say that they had seen Orpen paint the picture in Paris. Orpen withdrew from the purchase and gave the Tate a portrait of Sir William Symington McCormick instead. Orpen subsequently submitted Le Chef de l'Hôtel Chatham, Paris to the Royal Academy as his diploma painting.

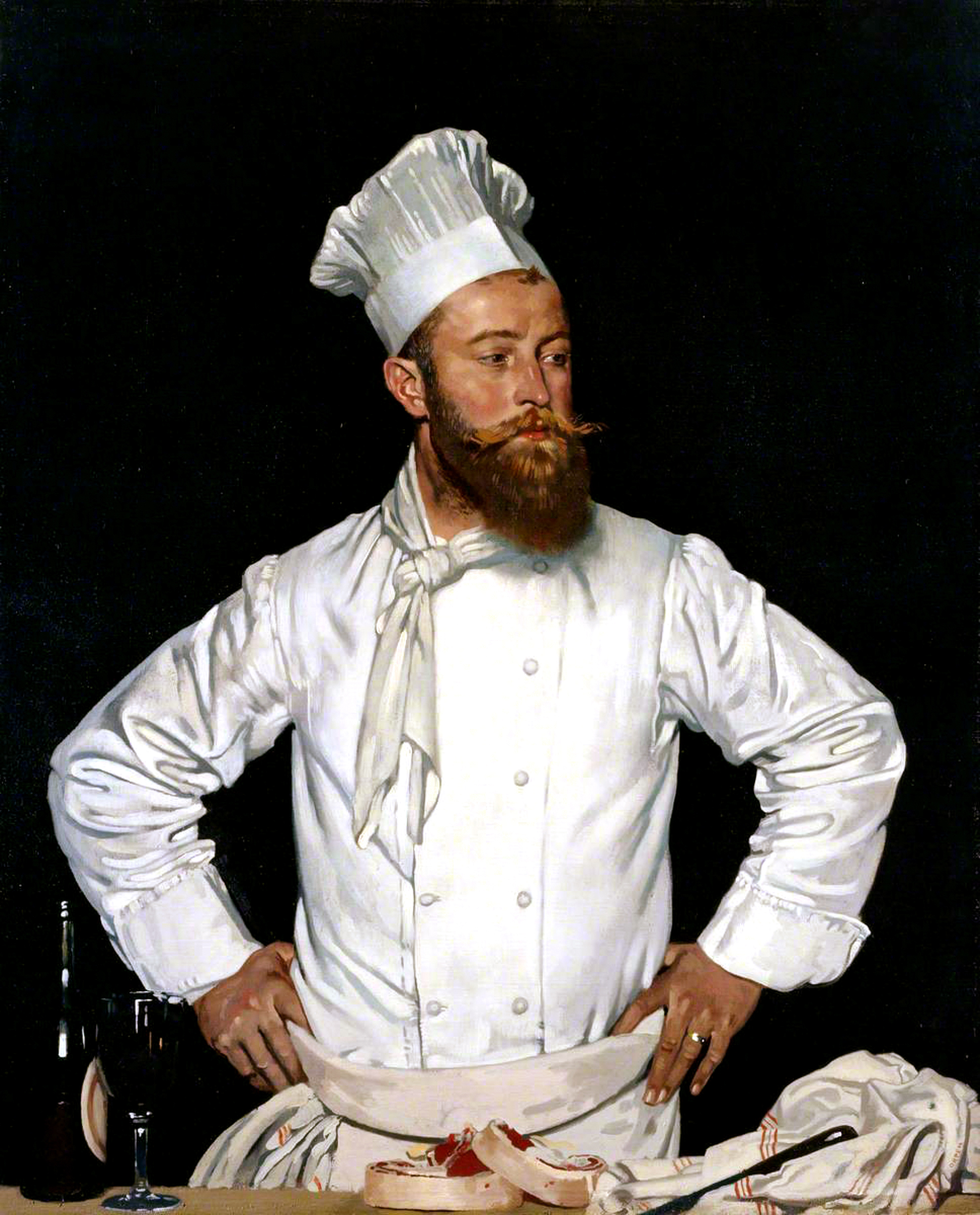
Le Chef de l'Hôtel Chatham, Paris (1921)

Orpen's wartime memoir, An Onlooker in France, 1917–1919, was published in 1921 and all the proceeds donated to war charities. In 1925, Orpen painted Sunlight, a brilliant depiction, in dappled sunlight, of a nude woman on a bed, behind whom hangs The Seine at Marly, the 1874 painting by Monet which Orpen owned. In 1922, Orpen was reported to be receiving treatment in London for 'tobacco poisoning'. In 1923, Lee introduced Orpen to the Prince of Wales, and secured Orpen a commission to paint the Prince for the Royal and Ancient Golf Club of St Andrews. A long series of disagreements followed between the Prince's advisors, who wanted a formal portrait, and Orpen, who wanted to paint Edward in his golf clothes. Orpen got his way but it was not until 1928 that the R&A put the painting on display. In 1927, Orpen accepted a commission to paint a portrait of David Lloyd George but the completed work was rejected as being too informal for such a senior politician. The painting remained with Orpen and was only purchased by the National Portrait Gallery after his death. In 1928 Orpen stood for election as President of the Royal Academy but lost to Sir William Llewellyn. His work was also part of the painting event in the art competition at the 1928 Summer Olympics.

=== Death ===
Orpen became seriously ill in May 1931, and died aged 52 in London, on 29 September 1931, and was buried at Putney Vale Cemetery. A stone tablet in the Island of Ireland Peace Park Memorial at Messines, Belgium, commemorates him.

== Self-portraits ==
Orpen created many self-portraits during his lifetime. He often portrayed himself in the act of painting and often created multiple images of himself. Whilst at the Slade he painted a double portrait of himself and Augustus John in the Nell Gwynne Tavern in London. In 1913 Orpen painted himself with a golden version of his painting Sowing New Seed as a background. Self-portrait as Chardin, from 1908, shows Orpen as the painter Jean-Baptiste-Siméon Chardin at an easel painting the same image. A year earlier he had painted a head-and-shoulders self-portrait after Chardin's 1776 work Self-Portrait with Pince-nez.

Orpen's 1910 self-portrait Leading the Life in the West has been read as a reference to the 1907 play The Playboy of the Western World, by John Millington Synge, whom Orpen knew and greatly liked. During World War I, Orpen painted at least three self-portraits, that ranged from the optimistic tones of Ready to Start, in June 1917, to more sombre depictions painted only a few months later. Bruce Arnold noted Orpen's interest in self-portraiture: his self-portraits are often searching and dramatic and seem to meet a deep personal need for frequent self-analysis. He once painted himself as a jockey, and in his The Dead Ptarmigan – a self-portrait in the National Gallery of Ireland he scowls from the frame while holding a dead ptarmigan at head height. Orpen's later self-portraits were less successful. Writing in 2005, Kenneth McConkey attributed the shallowness of Orpen's later portraits to emotional exhaustion, resulting from his experience as a painter of war. He wrote of Orpen's post-war activity:

"Now the portraits were done with mechanical efficiency, and without pause for reflection, save when he scrutinised himself and found a face he could no longer understand ... his face... grimaces, it squints, it scowls; in the 1920s it papers over the inner turmoil left by the long pathetic queues of gas-blinded tommies".

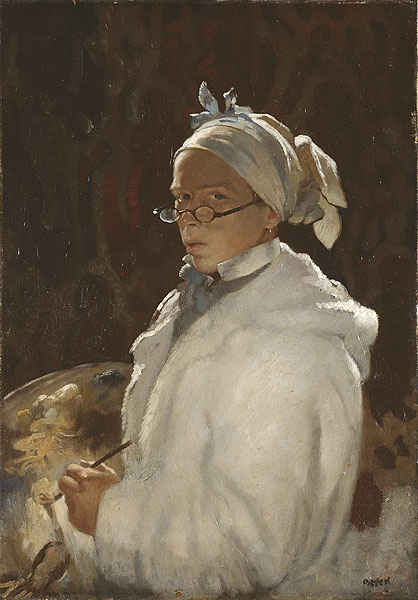
Self-portrait with glasses, (1907), National Gallery of Australia

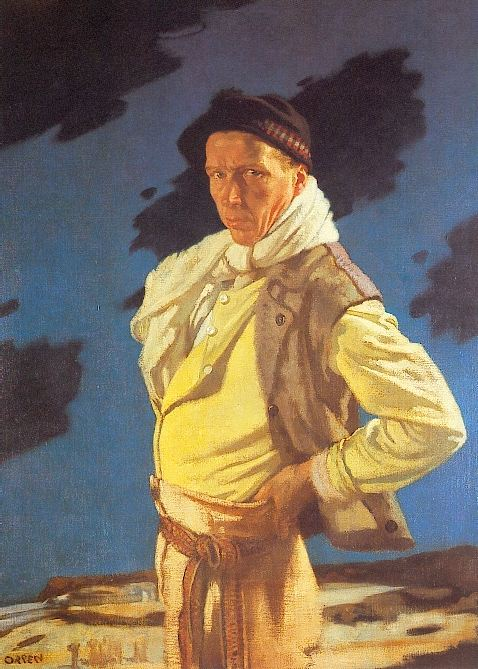
The Man from Aran, (1909)

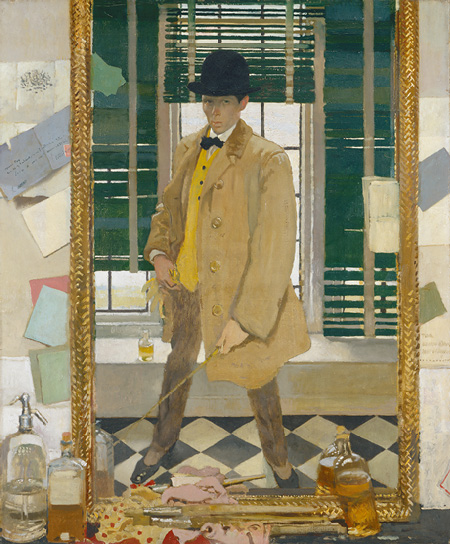
Leading the Life in the West, (c. 1910), Metropolitan Museum of Art

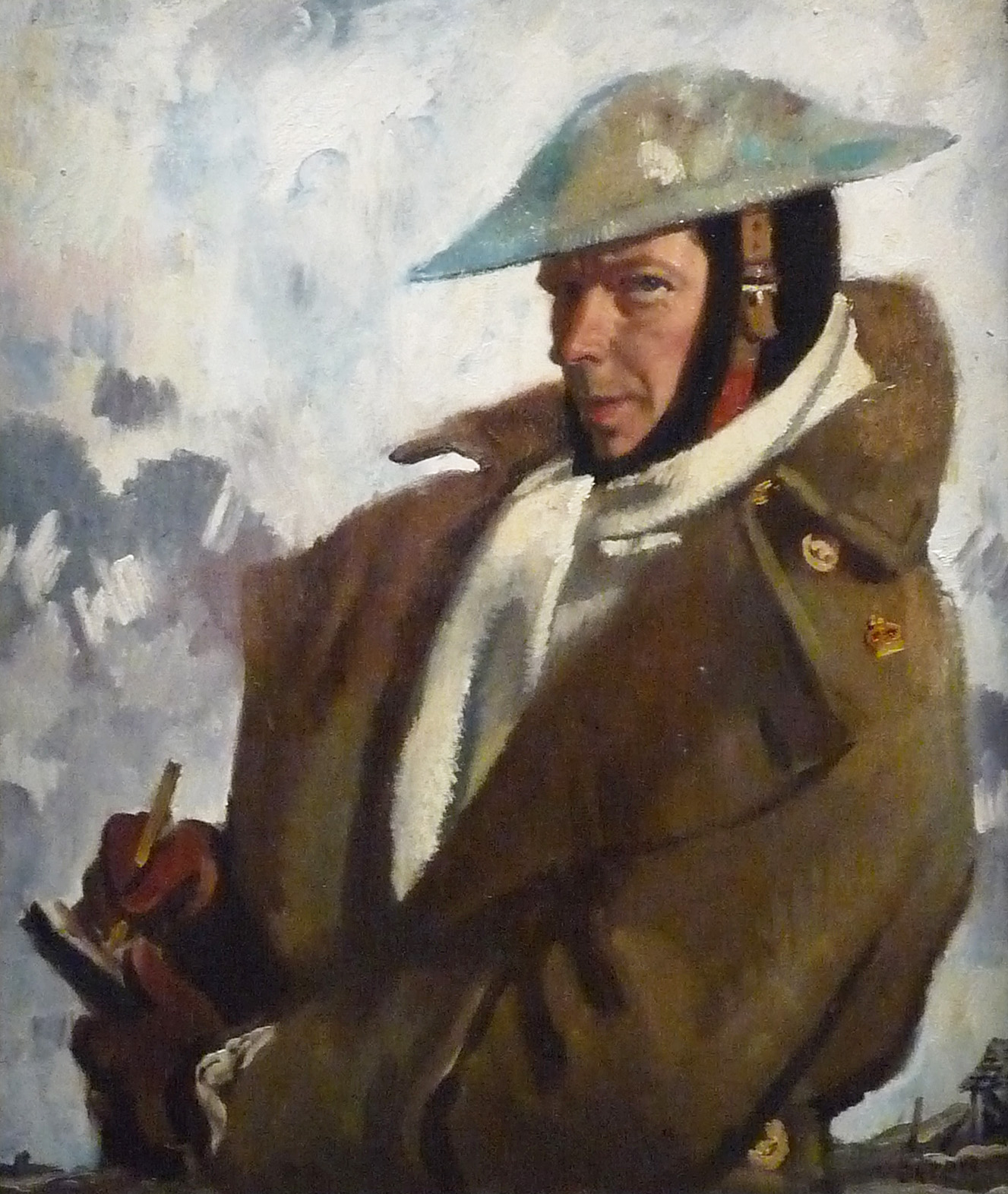
Self-Portrait, (1917)

== Legacy ==
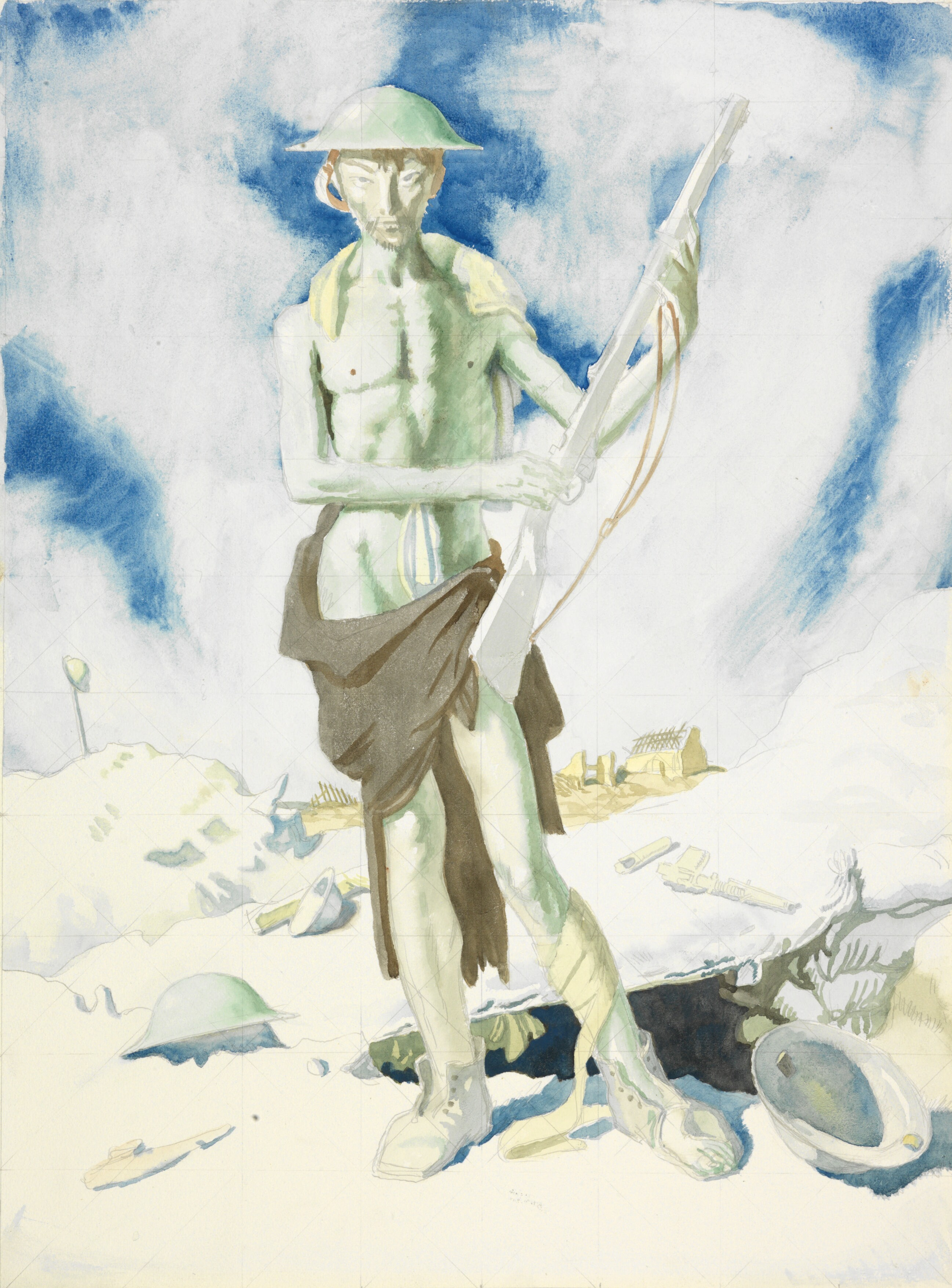
Blown Up, Mad (1917)

A memorial exhibition of Orpen's work was held in New York in 1932 and the Royal Academy also held a memorial exhibition in 1933, part of which travelled to the Birmingham City Art Gallery. Orpen's former friend Augustus John vilified him after his death, and an account in Wyndham Lewis's 1937 autobiography of an encounter between the two in Cassel during the war further tarnished Orpen's reputation. In 1952 the then Director of the Tate Gallery, John Rothenstein, who was related to Orpen by marriage, published Modern English Painters which, despite its title, included a chapter on Orpen that comprehensively criticised every aspect of his work and personality. This had a huge influence, and for many years Orpen was largely forgotten. Other than the collection of his war paintings in the 'Orpen Gallery' of the Imperial War Museum, only two of Orpen's works were regularly on display in Britain, The Mirror in the Tate and A Woman in Leeds City Art Gallery. A major retrospective of his work was held at the National Gallery of Ireland in 1978 but was not shown in Britain. Bruce Arnold's 1981 biography revived interest in Orpen among scholars, and in 2005 a major retrospective which also included his peacetime work was held at the Imperial War Museum, and led to a reappraisal of his place in British and Irish culture.

Bruce Arnold, writing in Irish Art a Concise History in 1969 stated:

... while at times his portraits are rather shallow, he was capable of excellent and sympathetic work, particularly in family and group portraits.

As noted by his biographer, H. L. Wellington,

Orpen was fond of painting women sitters against a black background, lighting the figure from two sides, an arrangement which gave luminosity and a certain ethereal appearance to his unfaltering but matter-of-fact statement…

== Memberships ==
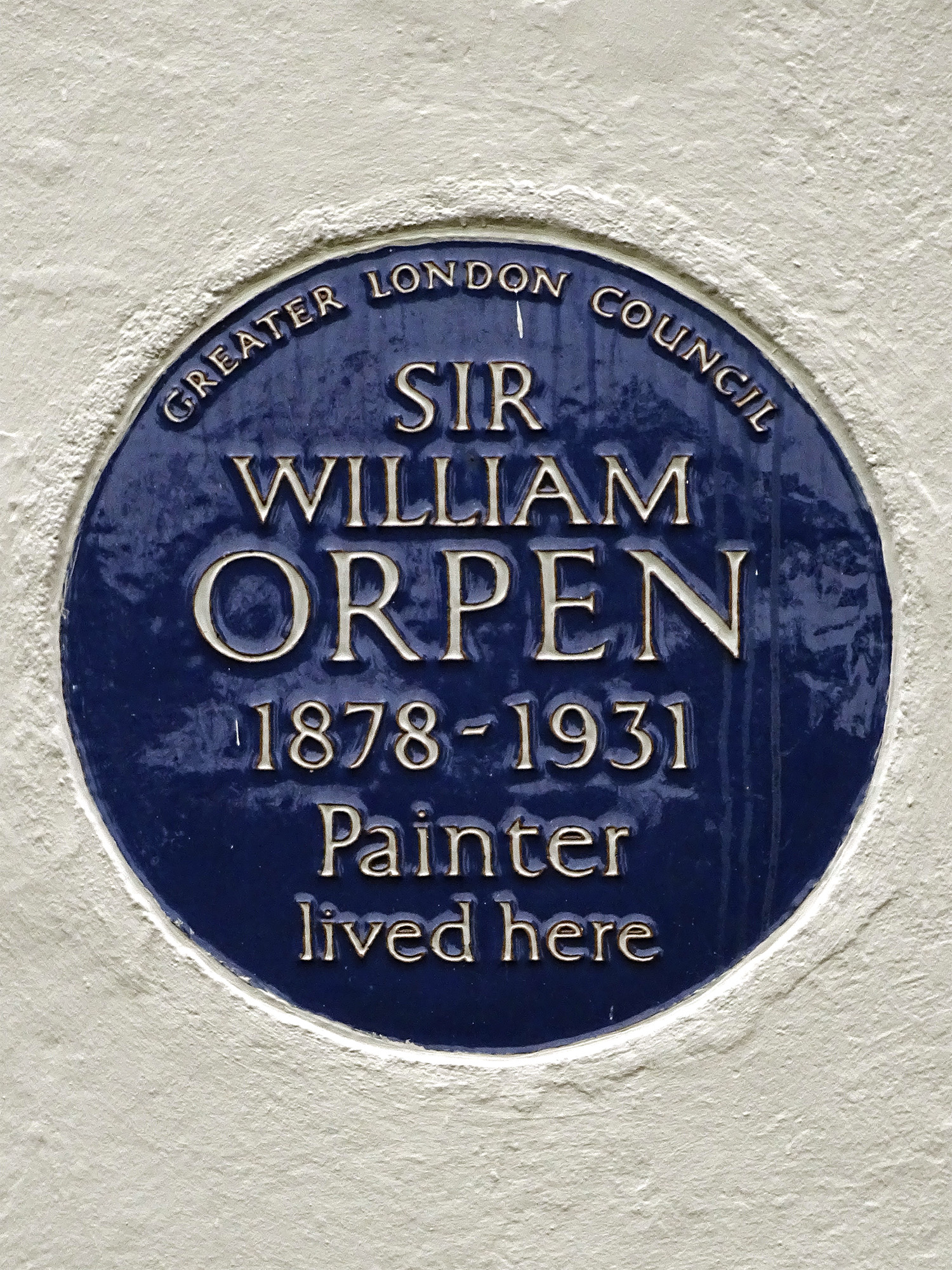
Plaque at 8 South Bolton Gardens, South Kensington, London

Orpen was a member or affiliated with the following organisations:

- 1900: Member, New English Art Club
- 1904: Elected associate of Royal Hibernian Academy
- 1908: Elected member of Royal Hibernian Academy
- 1908: Member, National Portrait Society
- 1919: Elected associate of the Royal Academy
- 1921: Elected member of the Royal Academy
- 1921: President, International Society of Sculptors, Painters and Gravers

== Bibliography ==
- An Onlooker in France, 1917–1919 (1921)
- Stories of Old Ireland and Myself (1924)
- The Outline of Art (1924)

== See also ==
- List of paintings by William Orpen
