= Garstin =

Garstin is a surname, and may refer to:

- Alethea Garstin (1894–1978), Cornish artist and illustrator
- Crosbie Garstin (1887–1930), poet, son of Norman
- John Henry Garstin (1838–1903), British administrator in India
- Norman Garstin (1847–1926), Irish artist, teacher, art critic, and journalist
