= Newlyn School of Art =

Coordinates: 50°6′5.31″N 5°33′9.70″W

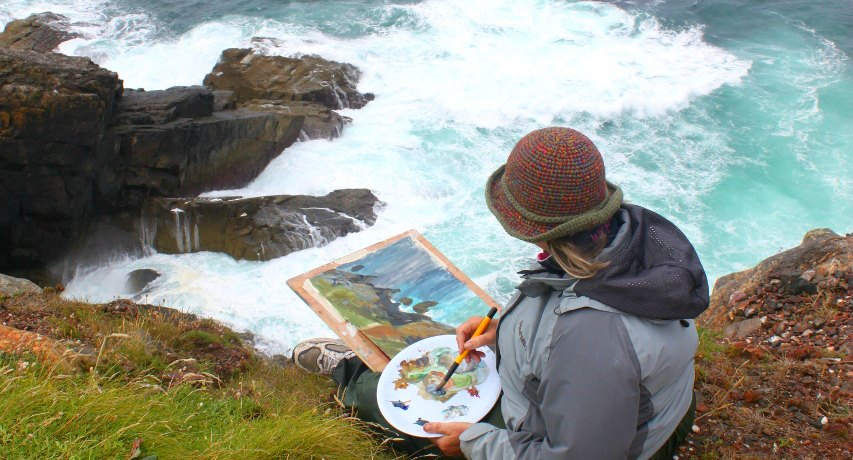
A student attending a "Coast Painting" art course at the school

Newlyn School of Art is a not-for-profit educational organisation based in West Cornwall offering short art courses and mentoring by way of professional development for artists. The art school was set up in 2011 with part funding from the Arts Council of England towards the equipment set up costs.

Newlyn School of Art is based in the famous artists' colony of Newlyn in West Cornwall and provides art courses in painting, drawing, sculpture, pottery and printmaking taught by many of the best known artists working in Cornwall today. Many of the art school's courses take place in the dramatic coastal surroundings nearby which inspired the famous Newlyn School of Painters in the late 1800s and early 1900s.

The art school has provided courses for over 2,000 students since opening towards the end of 2011. Aside from the courses it provides on its own premises at the art school it has also been commissioned to provide courses for Tate Gallery, Penlee House Gallery and Museum and in association with Newlyn Art Gallery in Cornwall. The first annual fundraising exhibition of the art school's tutors took place in October 2013 at Newlyn Art Gallery.

The school provides teaching work for over thirty of Cornwall's most respected artists currently including; Rose Hilton, Neil Pinkett, Jason Walker, Naomi Frears, Jack Doherty, Paul Lewin, Jesse Leroy Smith, Tim Shaw, Paul Wadsworth, Lisa Wright, Sam Bassett, Jessica Cooper, Gareth Edwards, Hannah Woodman, Patrick Lowry, Maggie O'Brien, Rachael Kantaris, Mary Crockett, Kate Walters, Mark Spray, Tom Rickman, David Paton, Mark Surridge, Marie Claire Hamon, Faye Dobinson, Claire Armitage, Lucy Willow, Caroline Pedler, Jacqui Knight, Nik Strangelove, Alex Higlett, Geogina Hounsome, Mark Jenkin and Rachael Reeves.

The art school is housed in a Victorian school building in the Artists' Quarter of Newlyn.
