= Ruth Simpson (artist) =

English painter (1889-1964)

- Born: Ruth Alison; 1889; Newcastle, United Kingdom
- Died: 1964 (aged 74–75); Redruth, Cornwall
- Known for: Painting
- Spouse: Charles Walter Simpson

Ruth Simpson (née Alison, 1889 – 1964) was a British artist who was an active member of the Newlyn School of artists and the Lamorna artists colony.

== Biography ==
Simpson was born in Newcastle upon Tyne, the daughter of Alister and Ada Alison. She studied art under Elizabeth and Stanhope Forbes at their school, the Forbes School of Painting, in Newlyn during 1911 and 1912. In Newlyn, Simpson lodged with her sister Rose and together they led a full social life. During this time Simpson met the artist Charles Walter Simpson and the couple married in 1913. Their daughter, Leonora, was born the following year in Newlyn. Subsequently, the family lived in different locations throughout Cornwall, including at Carbis Bay, Lamorna and at St Ives. A joint show of their work was held in 1919. In St Ives, starting in 1920 the Simpsons ran their own painting school, the Shore Studio, with Ruth specializing in teaching portrait painting. In 1924, they closed the painting school and moved to London but returned to Cornwall in 1931 and settled in Lamorna where they remained until 1945, when they moved to Penzance. It appears Ruth Simpson did little, if any, painting after returning from London and she died at Redruth in 1964 and is buried in the cemetery at Paul.

As an artist, Ruth Simpson largely focused on portrait painting. She developed a distinct style of portraiture, working with colour in a modern style and often using bright coloured backgrounds. She had three works in group shows hosted by the Society of Women Artists. She painted several portraits of women artists who were based in Cornwall, including Ella Naper and Gertrude Harvey. Her three-quarter length Portrait of an Officer is in the collection of the Imperial War Museum while her portrait of Frank Ver Beck is held by the Royal Cornwall Museum. Works by Simpson were included in the exhibition Painting in Newlyn 1880–1930 held at the Barbican Centre during 1985.
