= The Rain It Raineth Every Day =

1889 painting by Norman Garstin

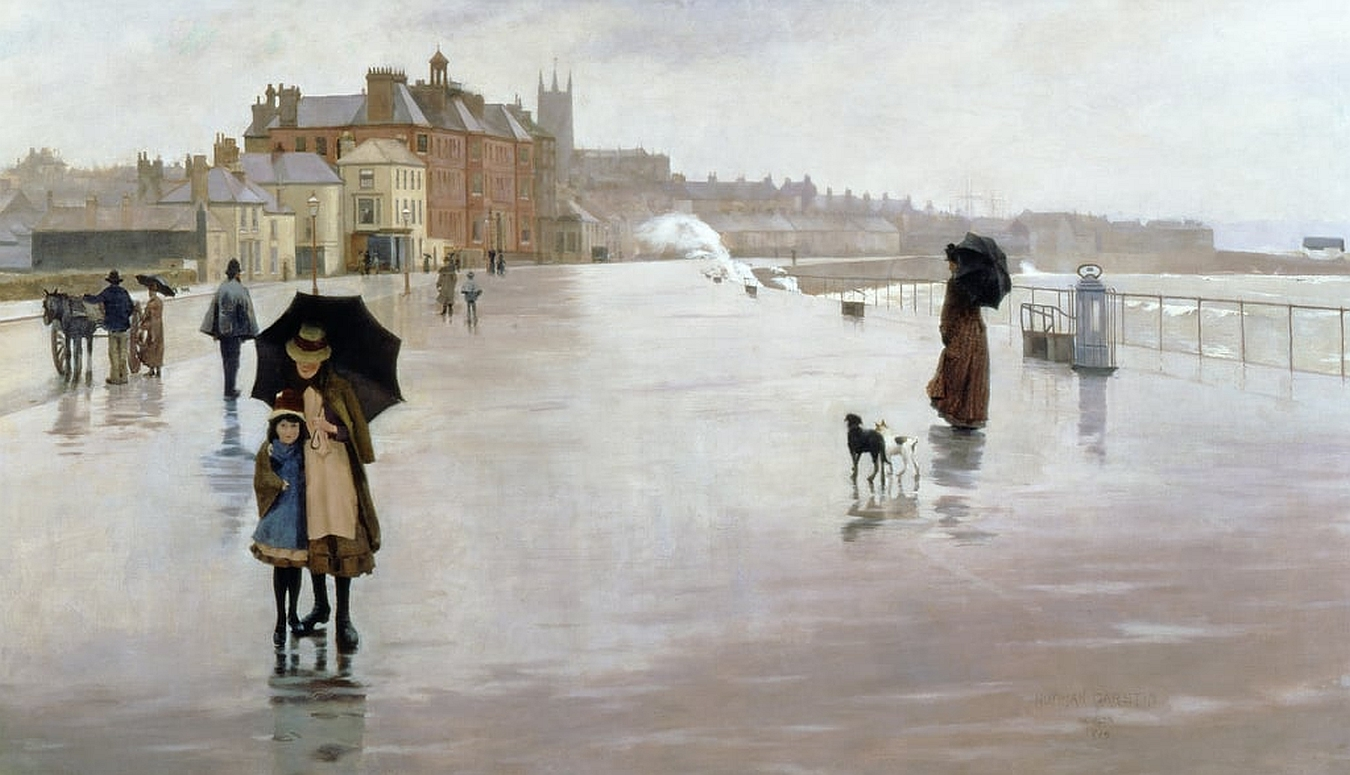
Norman Garstin, The Rain It Raineth Every Day, 1889, Penlee House

The Rain It Raineth Every Day is an 1889 oil-on-canvas painting by the Newlyn School artist Norman Garstin and is perhaps his best known work. The painting depicts the seafront between Newlyn and Penzance in Cornwall, in windy and rainy weather, with waves crashing onto the promenade. The painting measures 95 cm × 164 cm (37 in × 65 in) and is signed, "Norman Garstin Newlyn".

It shows several groups of people walking in the rain, some with umbrellas, a policeman with a cape, and a man standing beside a horse and cart. Among the buildings visible in the distance to the northeast are the Queens Hotel, Penzance and St Mary's Church, Penzance. Beside a rail at the edge of the promenade stands a blue painted cast iron RNLI collection box, installed in 1877 to raise funds for the Penlee lifeboat. The use of negative space shows influence from Degas, whom Garstin met when studying with Carolus-Duran in Paris: for example, compare Degas's 1876 painting Place de la Concorde, itself influenced by Japanese art and possibly by early photography.

Garstin sent the painting to the Royal Academy in 1889 but it was not selected for exhibition, possibly because the jury considered it was "too French" in style. The artist donated the work to Penzance Town Council, and it remains at the Penlee House gallery and museum in Penzance. It was not exhibited for some time after it was acquired, due to concerns that tourists would not wish to see Penzance in the rain.

The blue RNLI collection box was later removed from the sea front. It was bought online in 2018, and restored in 2020 by the BBC television programme The Repair Shop, to be exhibited at Penlee Lifeboat Station.

The title of the work refers to a line from either William Shakespeare's Twelfth Night, where the fool, Feste, closes the play with a song having as its refrain "the rain It raineth every day" (Act 5, scene 1, line 415), or from King Lear, where the Fool declares in Act 3, scene 2: "He that has and a little tiny wit / With heigh-ho, the wind and the rain / Must make content with his fortunes fit, / For the rain it raineth every day.".
