= Charles Walter Simpson (English artist) =

British artist

Charles Walter Simpson RI
- Born: 8 May 1885; Camberley, Surrey, England
- Died: 3 October 1971 (aged 86)
- Occupation: Painter
- Spouse: Ruth Simpson

Charles Walter Simpson RI (8 May 1885 – 3 October 1971) was an English painter. He was born in Camberley, Surrey, England. Simpson lived in Lamorna, Cornwall, in the early 1910s, and returned there in the 1930s, earning a reputation as an animal and bird painter. He exhibited at the Royal Academy in 1948, and his work was part of the art competitions at four Olympic Games. An exhibition of his work was held at Penlee House Gallery and Museum in 2005. From 1913 until her death in 1964, he was married to the artist Ruth Simpson.
