= Crosbie Garstin =

British poet and novelist

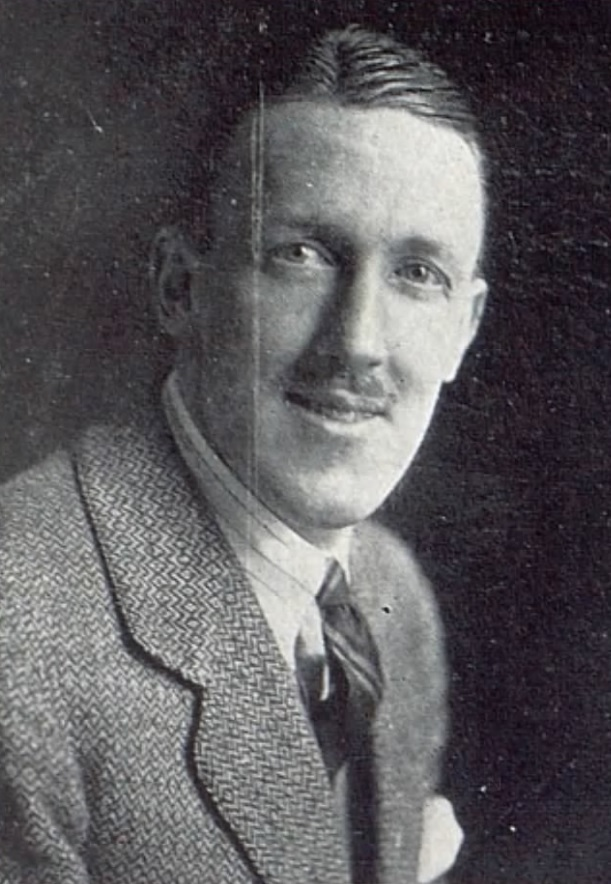
- Born: Crosbie Albert Norman Garstin; 7 May 1887; Newlyn, Cornwall, UK
- Disappeared: 19 April 1930 (aged 42); Salcombe, Devon, UK
- Status: Missing for 96 years, 4 months and 10 days
- Works: Penhale trilogy
- Spouse: Lilian Barkworth

Crosbie Garstin (7 May 1887 – 19 April 1930) was a poet, best-selling novelist and the eldest son of the Newlyn School painter Norman Garstin. He is said to have been "'untameable as a child", and to have "died in mysterious circumstances" after a boating accident in the Salcombe estuary. He is known for the Penhale trilogy of novels based in 18th-century Cornwall.

== Personal life ==
Crosbie was born in Mount Vernon, Newlyn, Cornwall to Norman Garstin and Louisa ‘Dochie’ née Jones. He was the eldest of three children; his siblings were Denys (later Denis) (1890–1918) and Alethea (1894–1978). He was educated at Brandon House, Cheltenham, Elstow School, Bedford and in Germany. He was head-boy of his school due to sporting prowess in rugby union and swimming.

As a young man he travelled and worked as a bronco buster in Montana, United States and as a lumberjack in Canada. He also travelled to China, Hawaii, Japan and Morocco. On returning home his father, fed-up with Crosbie's inability to get suitable qualifications and hold down a job, sent him to South Africa. From 1912, he ran a cattle ranch in Bechuanaland, and acted as a bush ranger to the Tati Concessions.

With the outbreak of the First World War, he came back to Britain and in October 1914 joined B Squadron of King Edward's Horse as a private. The cavalry regiment, which was open to colonials, was initially based in Watford and in the following spring, Bishop's Stortford. The regiment left for France on 21 April 1915 and Garstin was promoted to lance corporal shortly before leaving. He was commissioned on the battlefield as a 2nd lieutenant on 14 September 1915, and joined C Squadron, which was attached to the 47th (London) Division at Nœux-les-Mines and was involved in the Battle of Loos and on the Italian Front. In 1916 he was posted to Dublin as an intelligence officer during the rebellion there.

He met Lilian Barkworth when he rescued her from drowning in Lamorna on the Penwith Peninsula; they married in 1922.

As well as writing poetry, he made contributions to Punch which were well received. His younger brother Denis was also a published poet and contributor to Punch, as well as an accomplished soldier, journalist, diplomat, and international traveler; he was killed in action during World War I.

== Disappearance ==
Garstin disappeared while returning from a party to a friend's yacht, Osprey, via rowboat in the Salcombe estuary on 19 April 1930. The boat capsized and his body was never found, despite Garstin’s prowess as a strong swimmer. The boat’s other two occupants survived. He left an estate of gross value £3,424, and £1,549 net (equivalent to £87,539 in 2025).

His widow, Lilian, was mayor of Penzance in 1962–63.

== See also ==
- List of people who disappeared

== Works ==
- Up the Line to Death – contributor to the poetry anthology
- Vagabond Verses (1917)
- The Mud Larks (1918)
- The Sunshine Settlers (1918)
- The Mud Larks Again (1919)
- The Black Knight – with Mrs Alfred Sidgwick (1920)
- The Ballad of the Royal Ann (1922)
- The Coasts of Romance (1922)
- The Owls’ House – Penhale trilogy, book 1 (1923)
- Samuel Kelly, an Eighteenth Century Seaman – editor (1925)
- High Noon – Penhale trilogy, book 2 (1925)
- The West Wind – Penhale trilogy, book 3 (1926)
- The Dragon and the Lotus (1928)
- Houp-la! (1929)
- China Seas (1930) – was made into a film (1935) directed by Tay Garnett and starring Clark Gable and Jean Harlow
