= China Seas (film) =

1935 film by Tay Garnett

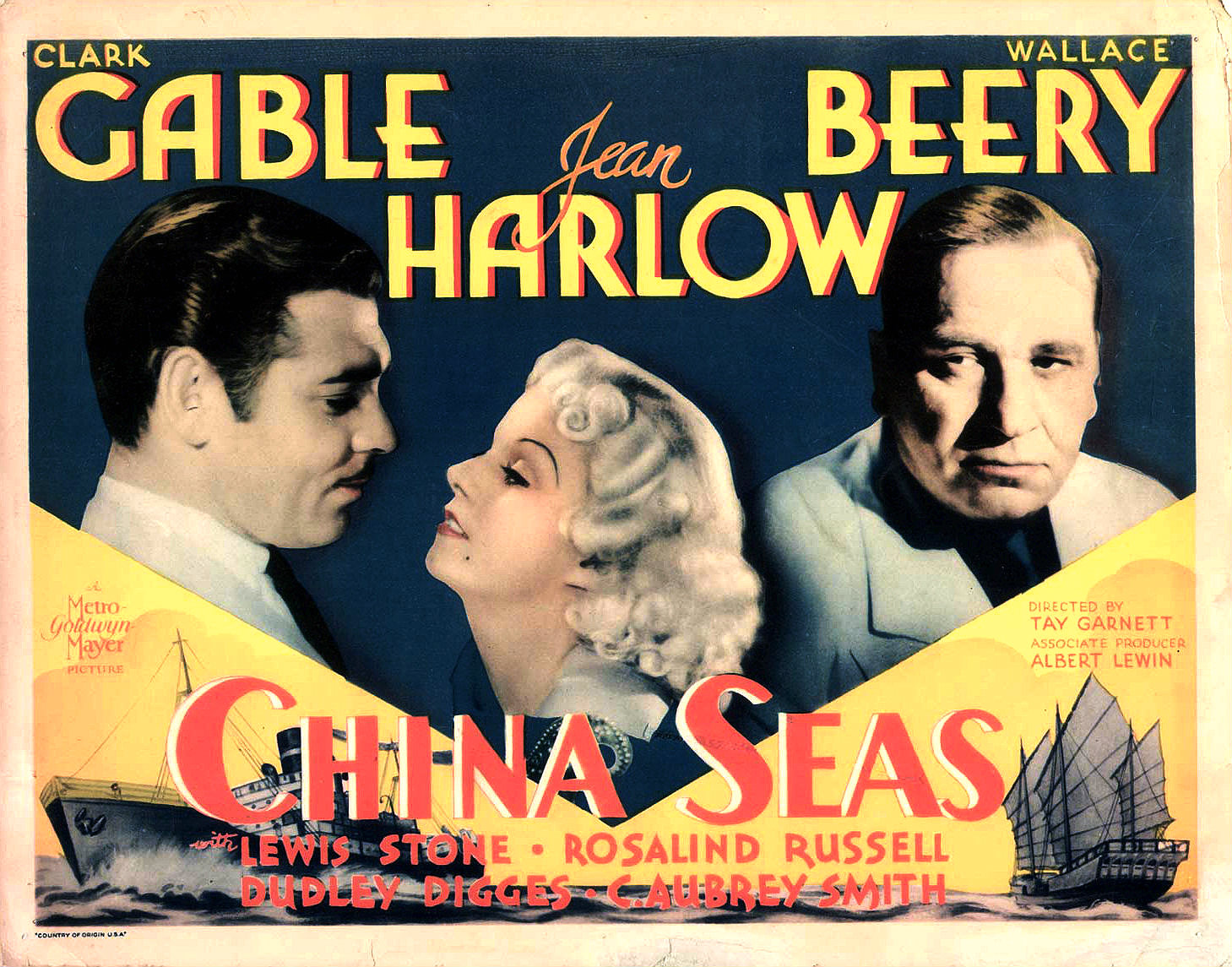
- Lobby card
- Directed by: Tay Garnett
- Written by: James Kevin McGuinness; Jules Furthman
- Based on: China Seas; 1931 novel by Crosbie Garstin
- Produced by: Irving Thalberg; Albert Lewin
- Starring: Clark Gable; Jean Harlow; Wallace Beery; Lewis Stone; Rosalind Russell; Robert Benchley; Akim Tamiroff
- Cinematography: Ray June; Clyde De Vinna (2nd unit)
- Edited by: William LeVanway
- Music by: Herbert Stothart
- Distributed by: Metro-Goldwyn-Mayer
- Release date: August 9, 1935
- Running time: 87 minutes
- Country: United States
- Language: English
- Budget: $1.1 million
- Box office: $2.8 million

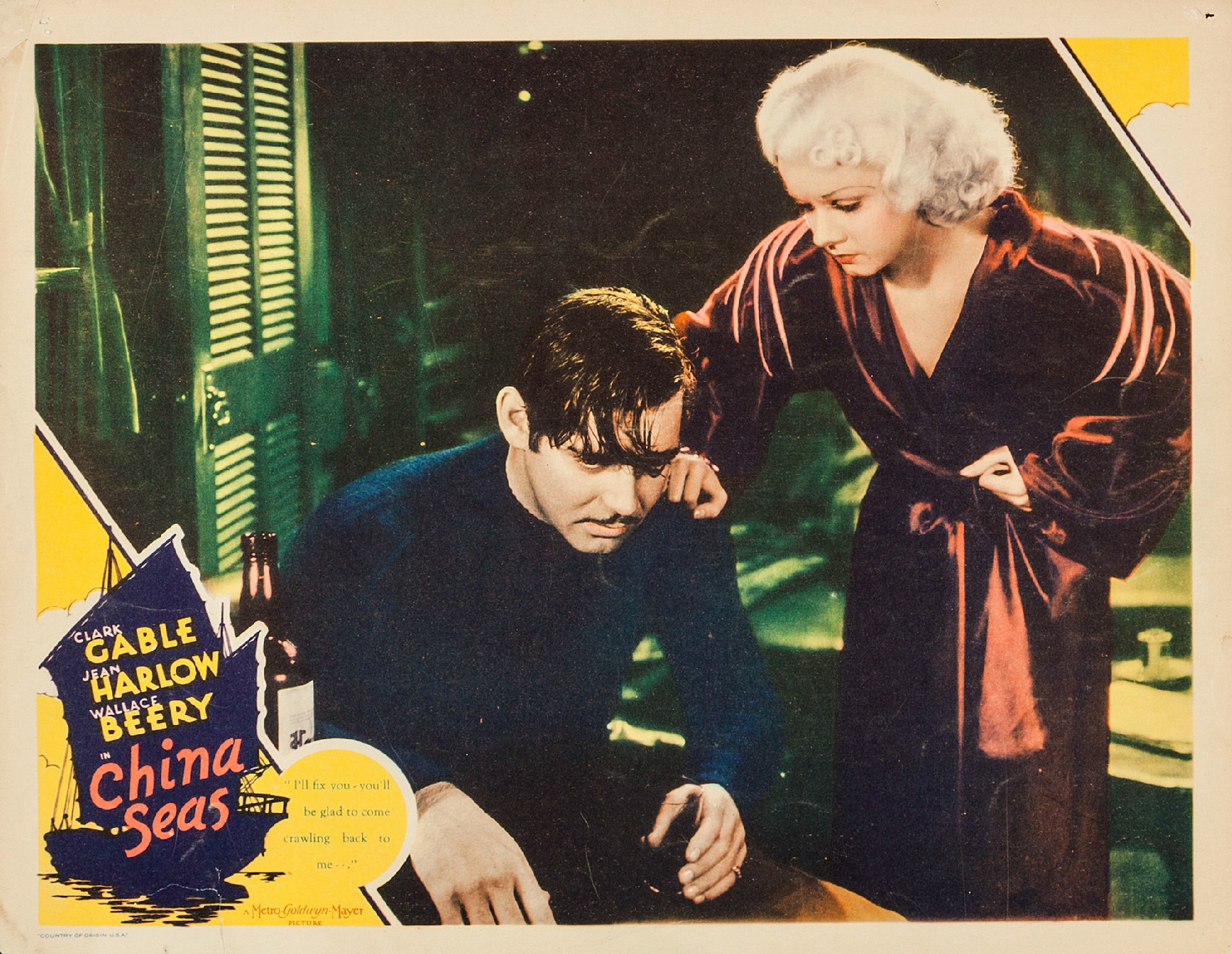
China Seas lobby card with Gable and Harlow

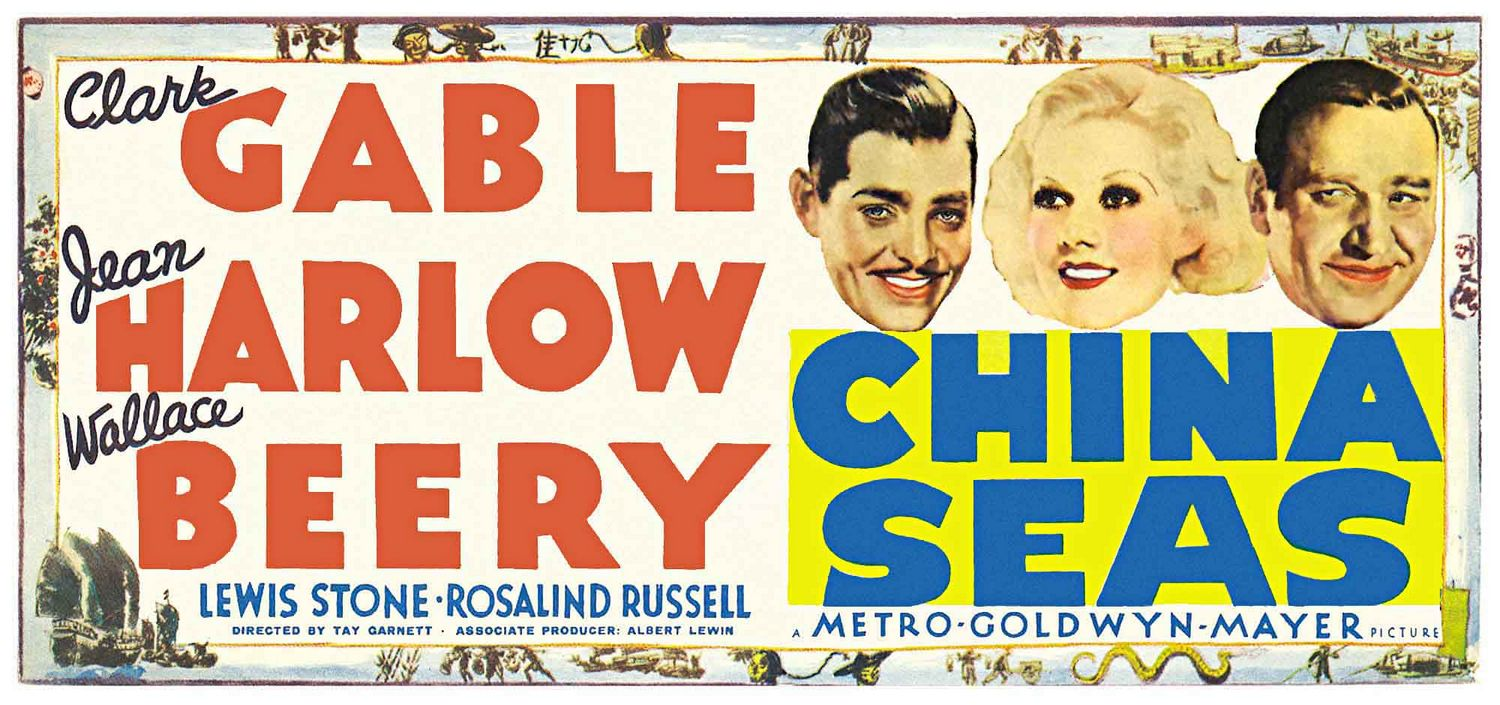
China Seas billboard

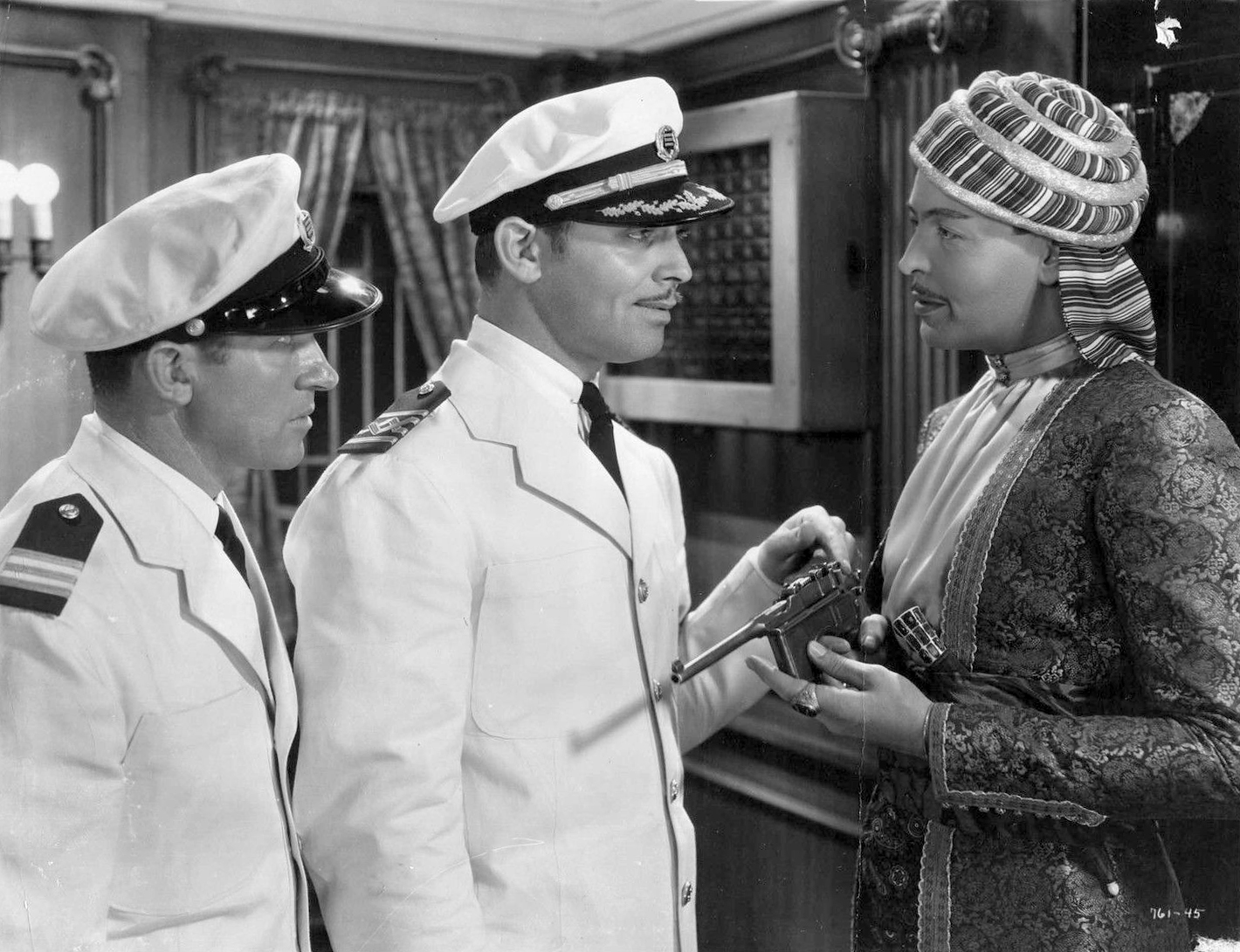
China Seas publicity photo

China Seas is a 1935 American adventure film starring Clark Gable as a brave sea captain, Jean Harlow as his brassy love, and Wallace Beery as the villain. The oceangoing epic also features Rosalind Russell, Lewis Stone, Akim Tamiroff, and Hattie McDaniel. Humorist Robert Benchley portrays a character reeling drunk from one end of the film to the other.

China Seas was written by James Kevin McGuinness and Jules Furthman, adapted from the 1930 book by Crosbie Garstin. It was directed by Tay Garnett. The film is one of only four sound films in which Beery did not receive top billing.

== Plot ==
Alan Gaskell is the abrasive, gambling captain of the Kin Lung, a steamer that shuttles between Singapore and Hong Kong. Dolly Portland is Alan's former girlfriend. Alan later describes her at the Captain's table as a "professional entertainer" who travels with her maid. She booked passage on this trip. Alan's fiancee, the aristocratic Sybil Barclay from Sussex, England, is also traveling on the Kin Lung. "I am in your hands again," Sybil taunts Alan. Alan and Sybil plan to marry when the ship docks in Singapore. However, Dolly wants to win back Alan.

On this trip, the Kin Lung is transporting gold bullion worth £250,000 GBP to Singapore. To safeguard the gold, Alan secretly transfers it from the ship strong box to a hidden location. Before the Kin Lung sails, the crew discovers pirates disguised as women passengers trying to board the ship. They also stop others trying to smuggle weapons aboard. The ship finally leaves Hong Kong.

Another passenger, Jamesy McArdle, is a thief in league with a gang of pirates planning to steal the gold. Dolly discovers the plot and attempts to warn Alan, but he ignores her warning. While on route, the ship passes through a violent typhoon. Alan risks his life helping the deck crew secure a steamroller that is in danger of falling overboard. The storm leaves some of the crew dead and the ship damaged.

After the storm, the Kin Lung is boarded by the Malay pirates working with McArdle. They rob the passengers of personal possessions and then open the strong box. However, they only find sand inside. The pirates and McArdle then torture Alan to find the gold, using a Malay Boot. Alan instructs the pirates, as they prepare to torture him: "My size is 9C". He then faints from the pain.

The pirates finally give up on finding the gold and disembark from the Kin Lung in two junks. Third Officer Davids destroys one junk by tossing a Mills Bomb into it, dying in the process. Alan sinks the second junk after hitting it with the light cannon on the deck. Fearful of arrest by the Singapore police, McArdle commits suicide.

When the Kin Lung docks in Singapore, Alan is limping due to his injured foot. He realizes finally that he does not love Sybil and ends their engagement. He tells Dolly that he should have listened to her about McArdle and asks Sally to marry him. As the film closes, Alan reveals that he had hid the gold in the steamroller toolbox, explaining why he had risked his life during the typhoon to secure it.

== Cast ==
- Clark Gable as Captain Alan Gaskell
- Jean Harlow as Dolly Portland aka China Doll
- Wallace Beery as Jamesy McArdle
- Lewis Stone as Tom Davids
- Rosalind Russell as Sybil Barclay
- Dudley Digges as Dawson
- C. Aubrey Smith as Sir Guy Wilmerding
- Robert Benchley as Charlie McCaleb
- Akim Tamiroff as Paul Romanoff
- William Henry as Rockwell
- Liev De Maigret as Mrs. Vollberg (credited as Live de Maigret)
- Lilian Bond as Mrs. Timmons (credited as Lillian Bond)
- Edward Brophy as Timmons
- Soo Yong as Yu-Lan
- Carol Ann Beery as Carol Ann
- Ivan Lebedeff as Ngah
- Hattie McDaniel as Isabel McCarthy (uncredited)
- Donald Meek as Chess Player (uncredited)
- Willie Fung as Cabin Boy Ah Sing (uncredited)

== Production ==
Wallace Beery as Jamesy McArdle

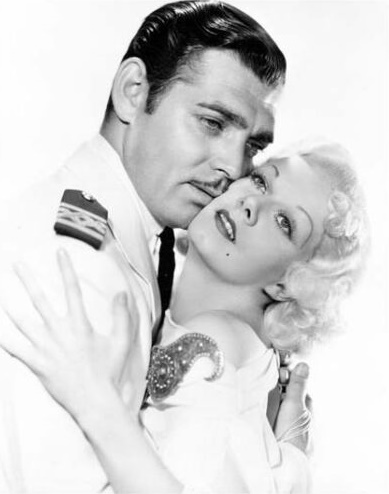
Gable as Alan Gaskell and Harlow as Dolly Portland

China Seas was an early Hollywood formula adventure-movie, loosely based on the Gable and Harlow film Red Dust (1932). MGM producer Irving Thalberg had worked on China Seas since 1930, when he assigned three different writers to come up with three different treatments. By 1931, Thalberg had decided on the one storyline. He then spent the next four years working on a script with 24 writers, six directors and three supervisors.

The screenwriter John Lee Mahin said Thalberg asked him and Jim McGuiness to look at the China Seas script that was written by Jules Furthman. Mahin said Furthman,

"...had stolen so much—practically word for word out of famous pieces. Things by Mark Twain and Somerset Maugham—and there was a well-known English novel of the time that he had taken a whole speech from. We discovered these, and we had to do quite a lot of rewriting. Granted, nothing’s new, but Jesus, you don’t just take whole lines of dialogue!"

During the film production, Clark Gable threw several temper tantrums on the China Seas set. MGM studio chief Louis B. Mayer tolerated them because Gable had recently won an Academy Award for Best Actor in It Happened One Night (1934) and he did not want to risk losing him. Mayer even tolerated that Gable risked his life by refusing a stunt double in a sequence. The stunt involved assisting numerous extras in roping in a runaway steamroller that crashed up and down the decks of the cantilevered studio ship.

Wallace Beery had worked with both Gable and Jean Harlow in The Secret Six (1931). In that film, Gable and Harlow had smaller supporting roles and Beery played the lead. Beery and Gable also appeared together that same year in the naval aviation film Hell Divers (1931). This time Gable had almost equal billing as Beery. Gable and Harlow were so popular together after Red Dust that they made six films together. Their final film together was Saratoga, released in 1937 after her death.

== Reception ==
Pauline Kael wrote:

"Classy-lady Rosalind Russell and Jean Harlow, as tough, hard-drinking "China Doll," compete for the affections of ship's officer Clark Gable. Russell can't compete, of course, 'cause that common girl is funny. Sleazy but likable M-G-M shipboard melodrama ... With Wallace Beery, in his likable-villain period, and Lewis Stone, in his noble-sufferer period, Robert Benchley as a drunk ... from a wisecracking, sexy screenplay ... "

Leslie Halliwell was enthusiastic:

"Omnibus shipboard melodrama, tersely scripted and featuring a splendid cast all somewhere near their best; slightly dated but very entertaining."

Leonard Maltin gave it three stars: "Impossible to dislike film with that cast even if the story ... is ludicrous."

The film was a big hit earning $1,710,000 in the US and Canada and $1,157,000 elsewhere resulting in profits of $653,000.
