= Norman Garstin =

Irish artist, teacher, and journalist (1847–1926)

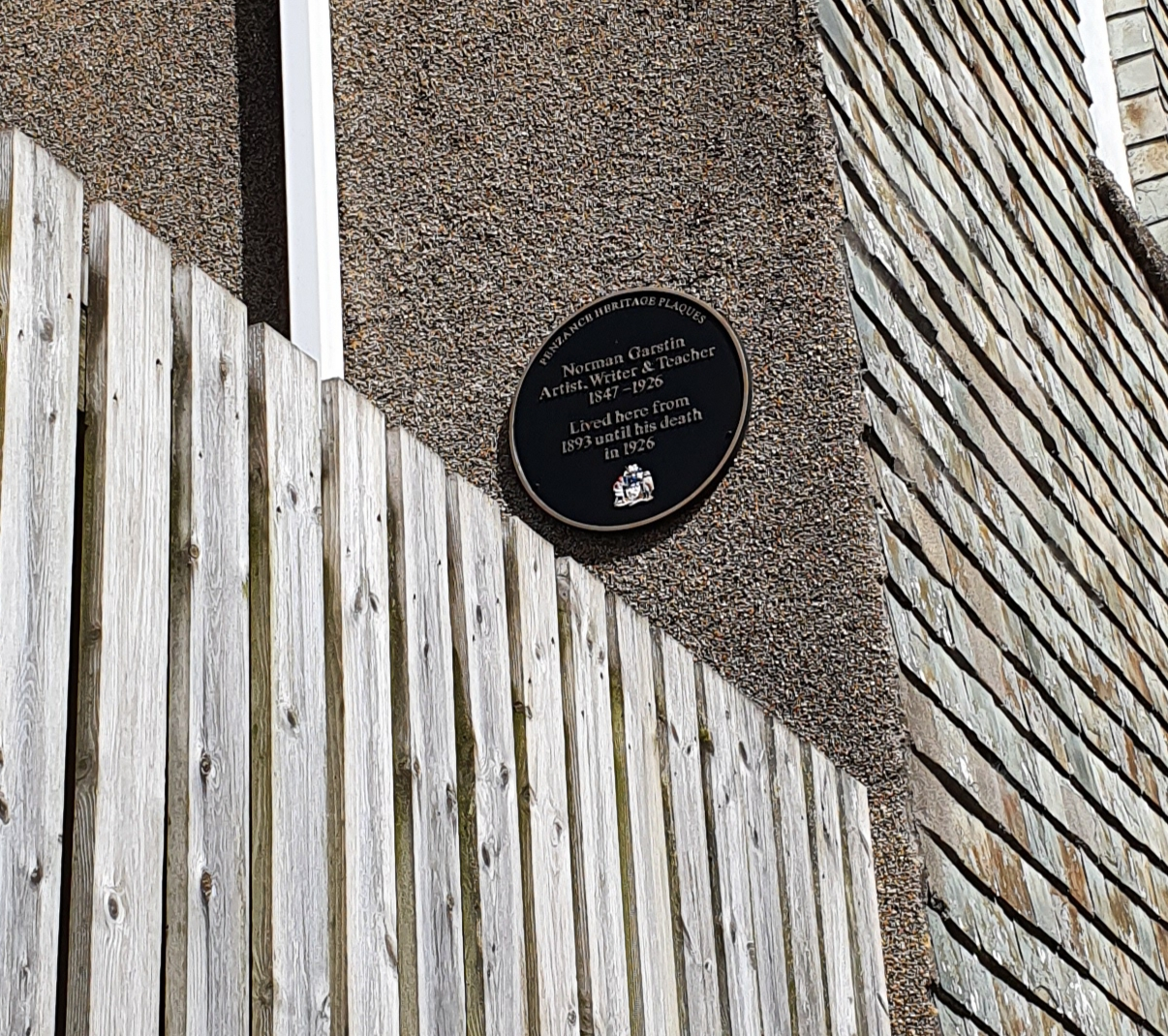
- Garstin's heritage plaque in Penzance
- Born: 28 August 1847; Caherconlish, County Limerick, Ireland
- Died: 22 June 1926 (aged 78); Penzance, Cornwall, England
- Education: Royal Academy in Antwerp, Carolus-Duran's academy
- Known for: Painter, art critic
- Movement: Newlyn School
- Spouse: Louisa Jones Garstin

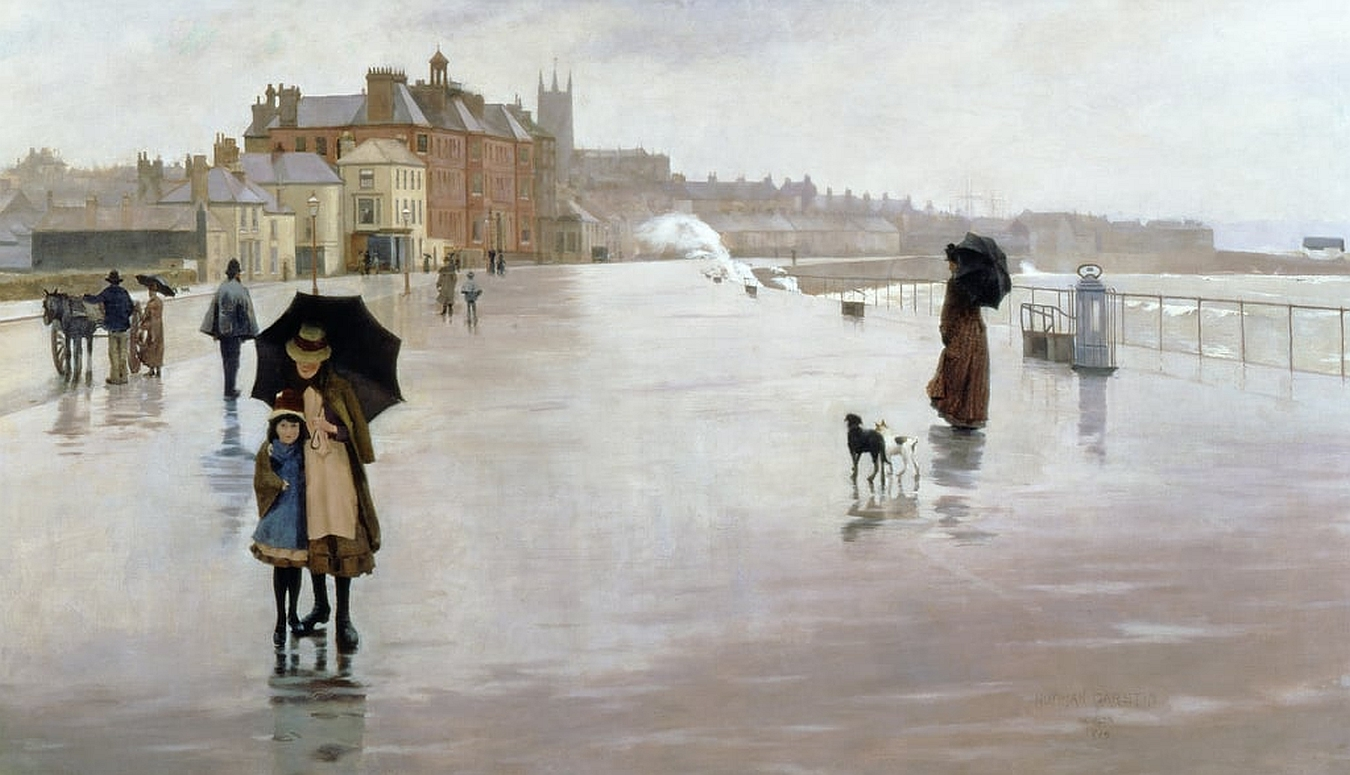
The Rain It Raineth Every Day, 1889, Penlee House

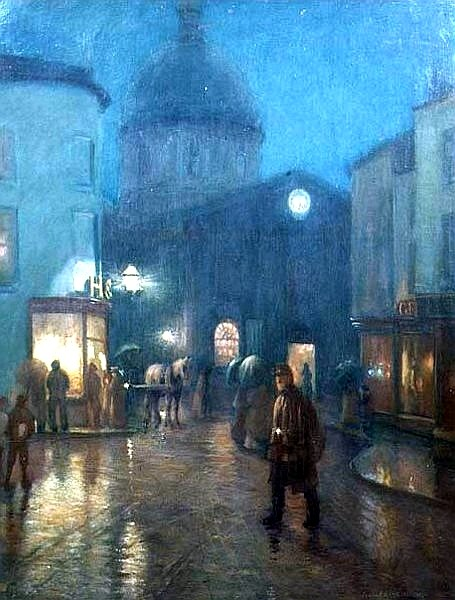
A Steady Drizzle, oil on canvas

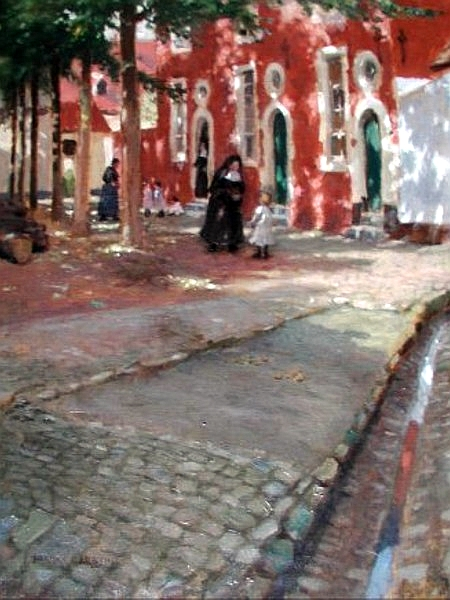
The Red Houses, 1912, oil on canvas

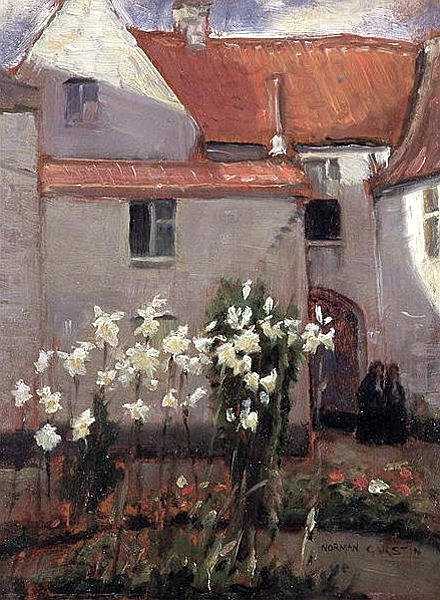
Madonna Lilies, oil on panel

Norman Garstin (28 August 1847 – 22 June 1926) was an Irish artist, teacher, art critic and journalist associated with the Newlyn School of painters. After completing his studies in Antwerp and Paris, Garstin travelled around Europe and painted some of his first professional paintings while on the journey. He later took students to Europe to some of his favourite places.

Garstin painted plein air and was influenced by Impressionism, Japanese works and James McNeill Whistler. Some of his works are at Tate and Penlee House. Garstin was a founding member of the Newlyn Art Gallery. His daughter, Alethea, was also a Newlyn School artist.

== Personal life ==
He was born 28 August 1847 in Caherconlish, County Limerick, Ireland to Captain William Garstin (Note: 100 Years in Newlyn states that Garstin's father was Colonel William Garstin of the 83rd Regiment.) and Mary Moore Garstin. He was raised by aunts and grandparents (Note: Cornwall Artists states that Garstin was brought up by loving aunts; Penlee House says that he was brought up by grandparents. Perhaps he was brought up by both sets of relatives over the course of his childhood.) following his father's suicide and his mother's incapacitating disabilities.

Garstin attended Victoria College on the island of Jersey and then he worked in architecture and engineering for brief periods. He then travelled to South Africa where he befriended Cecil Rhodes, worked as a journalist and was involved in government in Cape Town.

Pursuing an interest in art, Garstin trained in 1880 in Antwerp at the Royal Academy. From 1882 to 1884 he studied in Paris at an academy founded by Carolus-Duran. He then travelled and painted his way through Spain, Morocco and Venice, Italy.

In 1886, he married Louisa Jones, also known as Dochie. Many of Garstin's friends from school in Antwerp had settled in Newlyn; Garstin and Dochie moved to Mount Vernon in Newlyn by 1886. They had three children:

- Crosbie (7 May 1887 – 19 April 1930)
- Denis (born 22 July 1890 in Penzance)
- Alethea (1 June 1894 – 23 January 1978) (Note: Denis died in Russia at the end of World War I. Crosbie, a writer, poet and painter is believed to have died following a boating accident. There are some rumours that he may have survived and lived into his 70s.) The boys took up journalism and Alethea became an artist.

The family moved to Penzance by 1895. (Note: Penlee House states that the Garstins moved to Penzance in 1889.) On 22 June 1926, Garstin died in Penzance.

== Career ==
Garstin worked as a painter, teacher, art critic and journalist. As printed in 100 Years in Newlyn, Norman Garstin was:

He was a man of intensely individual impulses and opinions, and incurred unpopularity at times through his views on war and other topics. But he was a stimulating teacher and a shrewd critic, and had a true eye for a picture with old architecture and historic atmosphere, as well as a brush capable of rendering his intentions with right effect.

In 1888 he became a member of the New English Art Club (NEAC). Garstin became a member of the Newlyn Society of Artists (NSA) and was on the Newlyn Art Gallery's Provisional Committee for its opening in 1895. Garstin said of the plein-air approach used by St Ives and Newlyn artists: They were "filled with this idea of a fresh unarranged nature to be studied in her fields, and by her streams, and on the margin of her great seas – in these things they were to find the motives of their art."

He was a teacher and took groups to "his favorite painting haunts on the Continent." For instance, Frances Hodgkins, a New Zealand artist, attended Garstin's 1901 and 1902 summer sketching classes in France. He taught Harold Harvey, the only Cornish Newlyn School painter, and his daughter, Alethea.

== Works ==
His work consisted primarily of small oil panels in the plein air style, something he had picked up from the French Impressionists, like Manet. He was also fascinated by Japanese prints and admired the work of the American painter James McNeill Whistler.

One of his best and most famous works is his 1889 painting The Rain, it raineth every day of the Penzance promenade. The title of the work comes from Shakespeare's King Lear and Twelfth Night. "The composition of this painting demonstrates Garstin's admiration for Japanese art," says Penlee House.

A partial list of his works includes:

- Crosbie Garstin as a Baby, 1887, oil on canvas, Penlee House, loan from Newlyn Art Gallery
- In a Cottage by the Sea, 1887, oil on canvas, Penlee House, loan from Newlyn Art Gallery
- The Drinking Pool, 1887, watercolour
- The Rain, it raineth every day, 1889, oil on canvas
- A View of Newlyn from the North Pier, c. 1892, oil on canvas, Penlee House, loan from Newlyn Art Gallery
- Houses and Boats, oil on panel, Penlee House, loan from Newlyn Art Gallery
- Market Jew Street, oil on panel, Penlee House, loan from Newlyn Art Gallery
- Saturday (an Interior View of Garstin's Home), oil on panel, Penlee House, loan from Newlyn Art Gallery

== Gallery ==
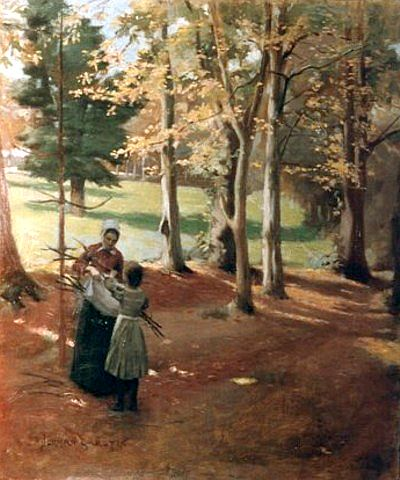
Autumn, 1882, oil on canvas

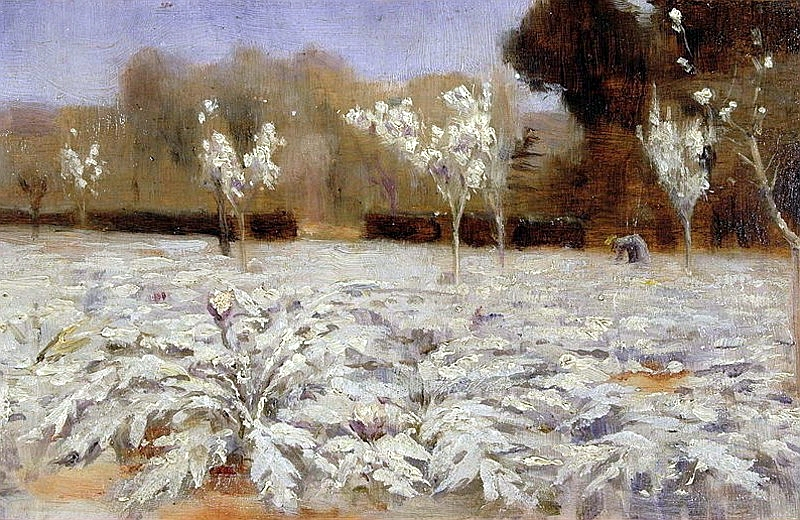
Artichokes Hyeres, 1883, oil on panel

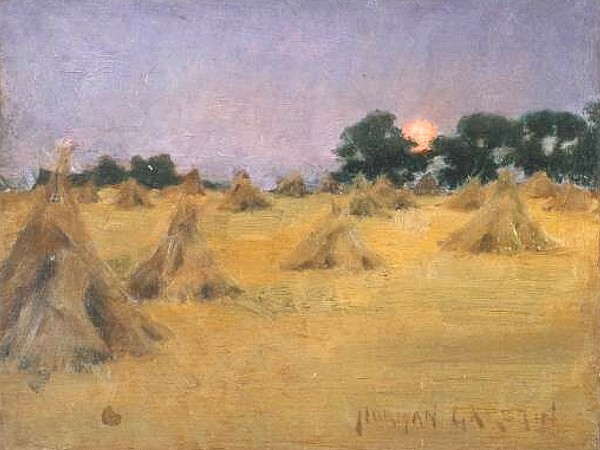
Haycocks And Sun, 1886, oil on wood

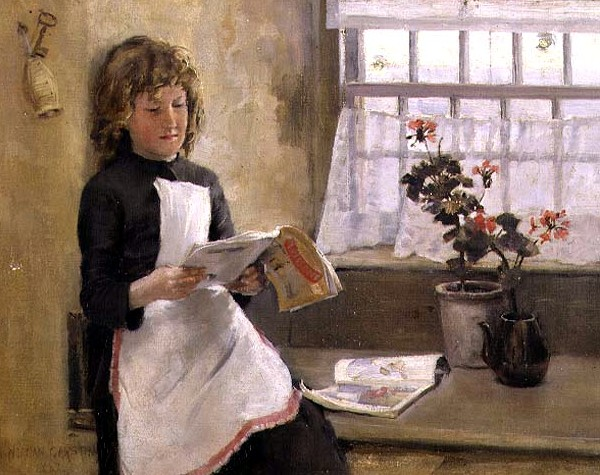
In a Cottage, 1887, oil on canvas

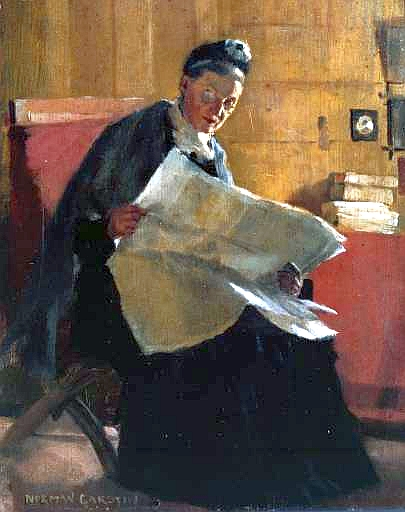
A Woman Reading A Newspaper, 1891, oil on wood

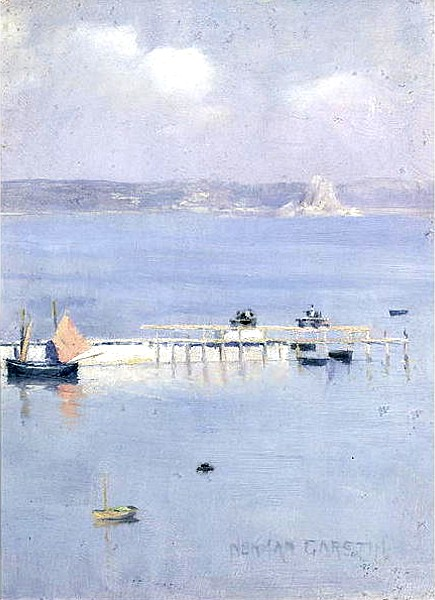
A View of Mount's Bay, 1892, oil on panel

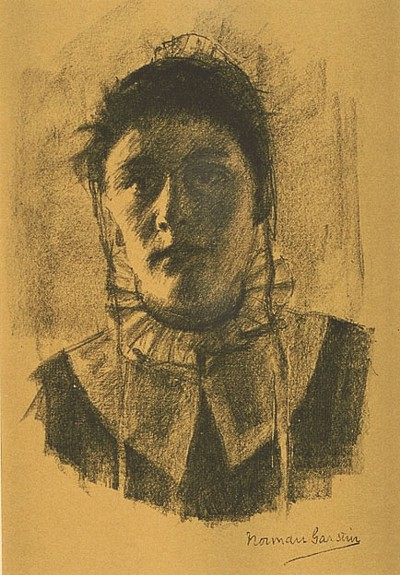
Portrait of a Basque Woman, 1896, lithograph

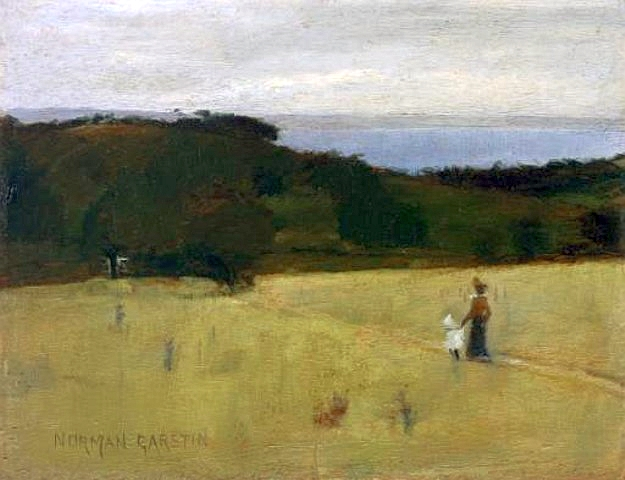
Alethea And Her Mother, 1898, oil on wood

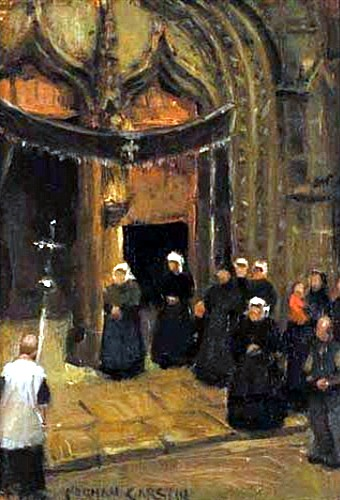
Notre Dame Du Roncier Josselin, 1911, oil on panel

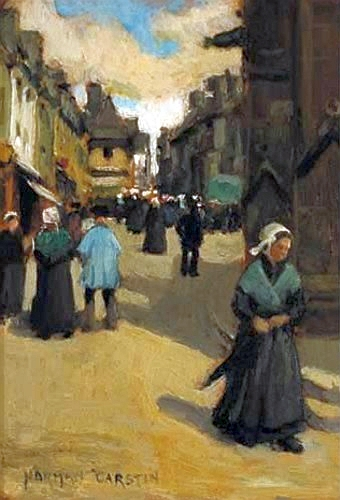
Saturday Josselin, 1911, oil on panel

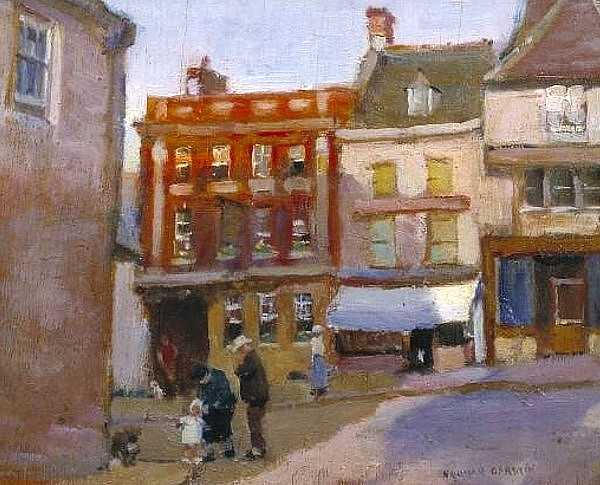
The Bull Hotel, 1916, oil on wood

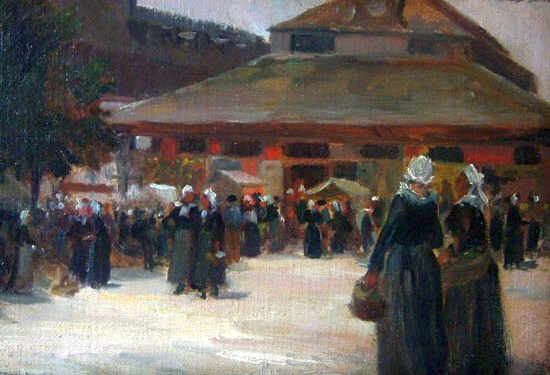
Breton Women at la Faouet

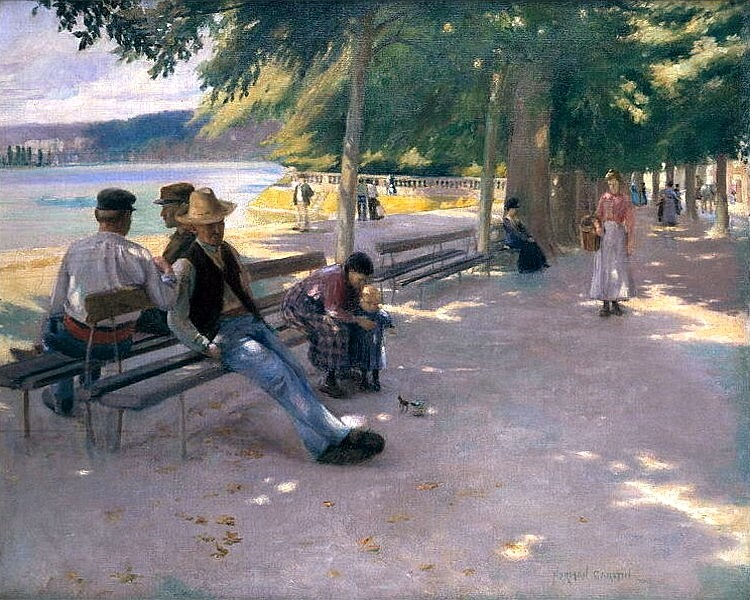
In The Shade, oil on canvas

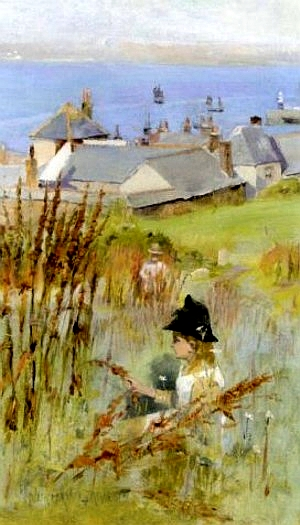
Newlyn from the Meadow

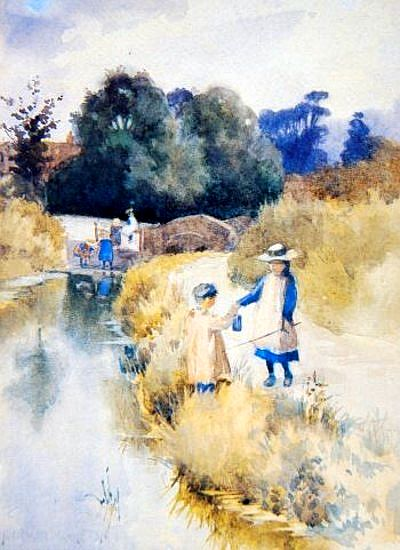
Tiddlers, watercolour
