= Newlyn Art Gallery =

British contemporary art gallery

Coordinates: 50.102°N 5.551°W

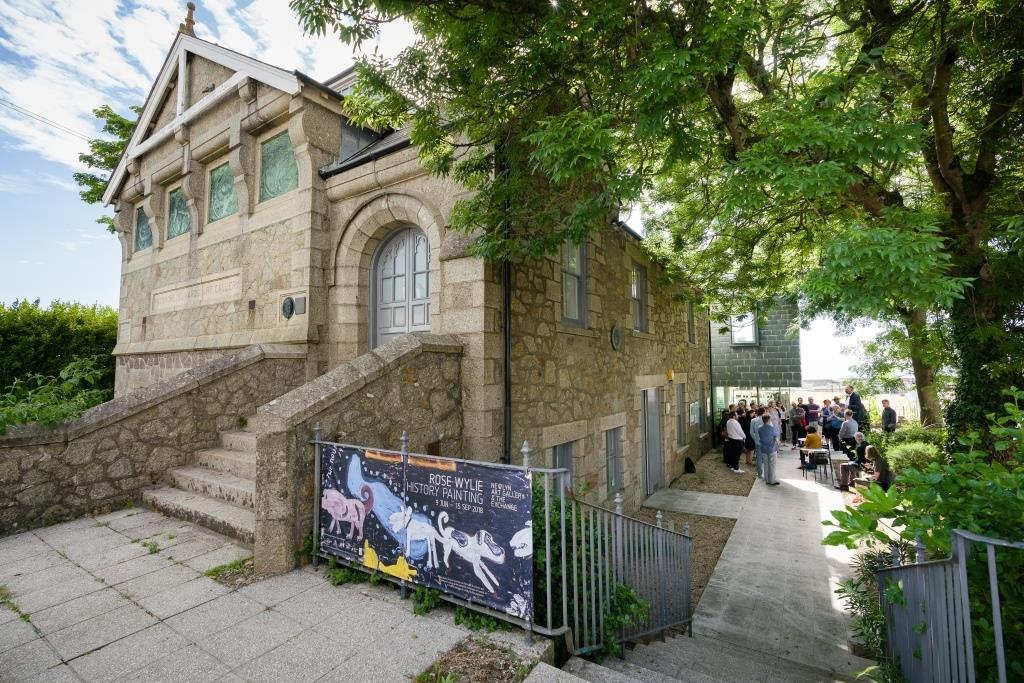
Newlyn Art Gallery

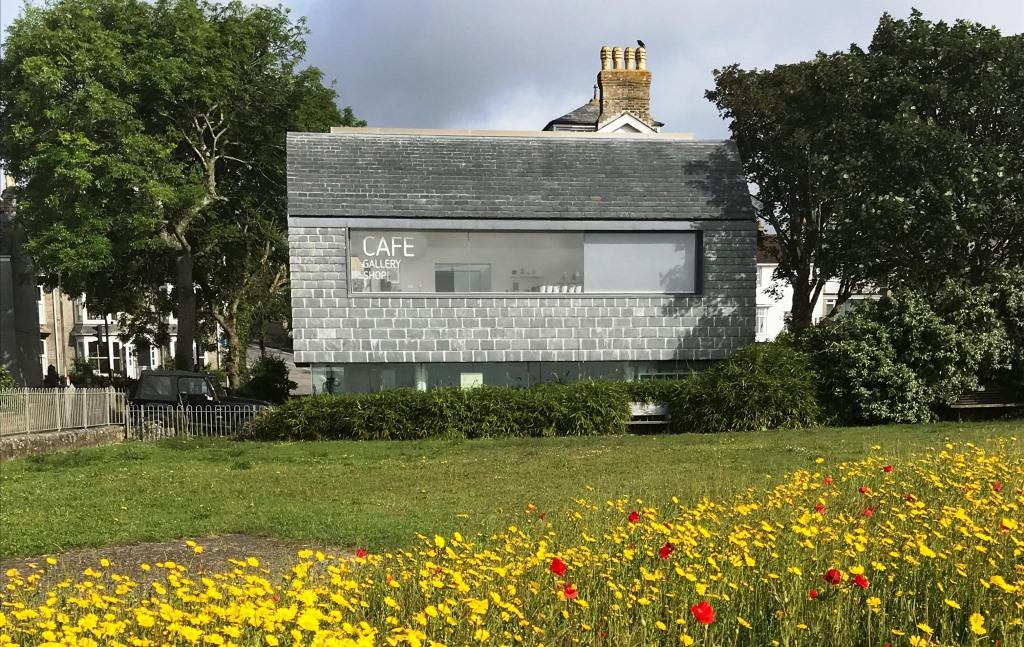
Rear of Newlyn Art Gallery

Newlyn Art Gallery is a contemporary art gallery located in Newlyn, Cornwall, UK. Opened in 1895, designed by James Hicks of Redruth and financed by John Passmore Edwards the gallery was conceived as a home and exhibition venue for the Newlyn School of Art the works of which are now largely located at Penlee House Gallery and Museum in nearby Penzance.

Following an architectural design competition managed by RIBA Competitions, the gallery was redeveloped and a second venue The Exchange in Penzance, was opened in 2007. With two venues it offers a wide and varied programme across two sites. The focus at Newlyn Art Gallery is on painting and drawing. Artists working in other media continue to be a part of the programme on occasions, but two-dimensional work is the clear focus. Recent shows have included major retrospectives by Roger Hilton and Breon O'Casey. As a dog-friendly venue, dogs on leads are allowed to visit the gallery.

At Newlyn Art Gallery, the pavilion on the seaward side of the gallery is a glass structure on the ground-floor level, which supports a first floor clad in wet-laid Cornish slate, a building method specific to the region, but rarely seen in modern buildings. The glass curtain wall allows panoramic views of Newlyn Green and the sea while sliding doors lead to a secluded garden and outdoor seating area. The versatile Lower Gallery presents small exhibitions, projects and events. The Education Room and Studio Cafe on the first floor of the pavilion has a large window offering panoramic views across Mount's Bay, as well as a skylight the length of the gabled ceiling.

== The Exchange ==
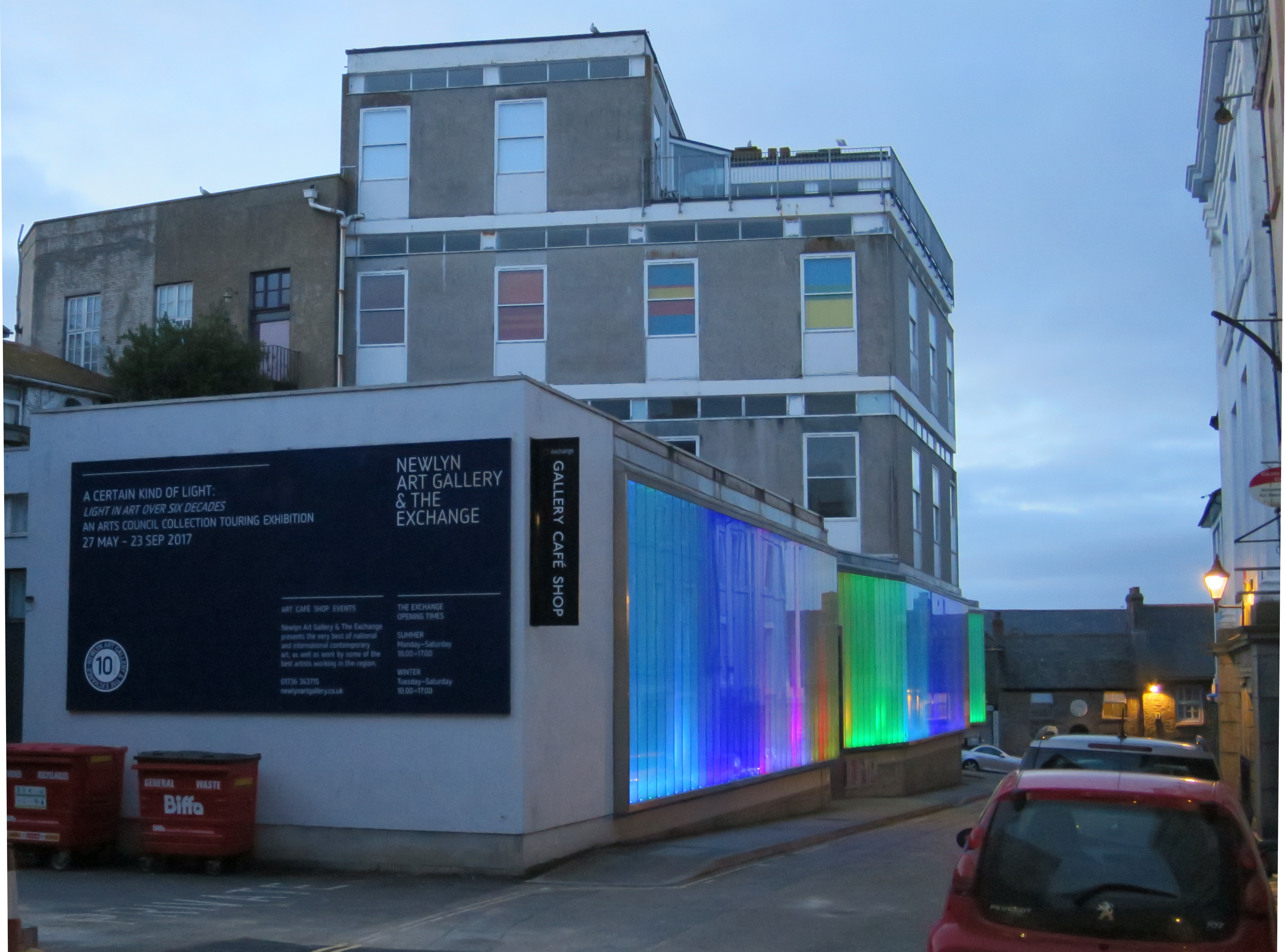
The Exchange Gallery, Penzance

The Exchange was converted from a telephone exchange. It has a large T-shaped gallery, double the size of Newlyn's gallery, which is regularly used as a project space in which artists and curators test new ideas. The Exchange enables audiences to see large-scale work not previously accessible in the region. It is also used as a venue for live performances, film screenings and community events.

The Exchange has an undulating glass façade which runs the entire length of the building, which is a former telephone exchange. A dramatic, changing light display, designed by Penwith-based artist Peter Freeman illuminates the glass panels according to the exhibitions and time of day and year.
