= Alethea Garstin =

British landscape painter (1894–1978)

- Born: 1 June 1894; Penzance
- Died: 23 January 1978 (aged 83)

Alethea Garstin (1894–1978) was a Cornish artist and illustrator who exhibited paintings regularly at London's Royal Academy from an early age.

== Life and work ==
Garstin was born in Penzance, Cornwall on 1 June 1894, the daughter of painter Norman Garstin and his wife Louisa, and the younger sister of the writer Crosbie Garstin. She was trained as a painter by her father, and joined him on his trips round France on his bicycle. She first exhibited a painting, "The Chairmakers", at the Royal Academy in 1912 and the president of the Royal Academy was so impressed that he asked to meet her. She also displayed a much larger painting of the Market Place at Gemene, Brittany, the following year.

Garstin later created illustrations for magazines including Punch and Tatler. She continued to exhibit at the Royal Academy until 1945 and was elected as a Member of the Royal West of England Academy in 1949.

== Notable exhibitions ==
Garstin's works were considered tonal and she was able to contrast temperature with different colours and tones. Her best known exhibitions include the Adams Gallery, Pall Mall, London in 1940 which was a solo exhibition of over 60 paintings, highlights being "Penzance Promenade" and "Penzance Harbour". The Western Morning News described the latter as "something of the effective simplicity and artistic economy of selection that the best modern French paintings have."

In the United Services Centre, Plymouth in 1945, where Garstin put on a joint exhibition with Newlyn painter Gertrude Harvey. and she put on a joint exhibition with her father's works entitled Norman and Alethea Garstin. Two Impressionists - Father and Daughter, Newlyn, Bristol, Dublin and London in 1978.

== Public collections ==
Paintings by Garstin are currently in the Government Art Collection and the collections of the Bristol Museum and Art Gallery, Plymouth City Museum and Art Gallery, the Royal West of England Academy and the National Trust.
