= Elizabeth Forbes (artist) =

Canadian-English painter (1859–1912)

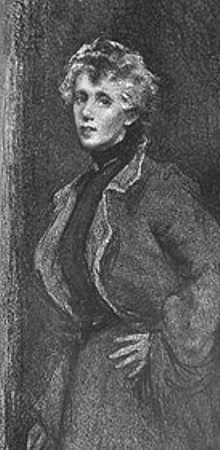
- Self-portrait about 1900
- Born: Elizabeth Armstrong; 29 December 1859; Kingston, Canada West
- Died: 16 March 1912 (aged 52); Newlyn, England
- Education: South Kensington Art School
- Known for: Painter
- Movement: Newlyn School
- Spouse: Stanhope Forbes (m. 1889)

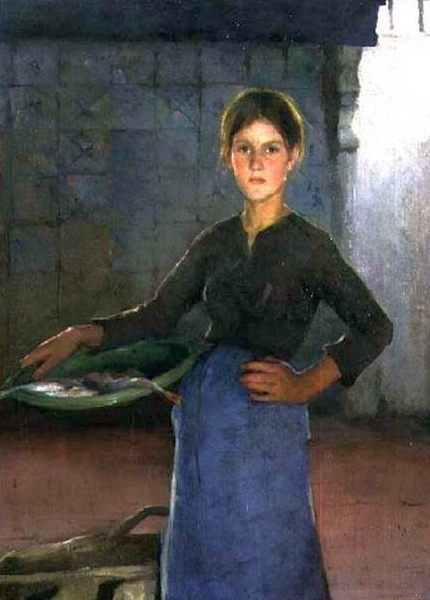
The Zandvoort Fishergirl, 1884, oil on canvas

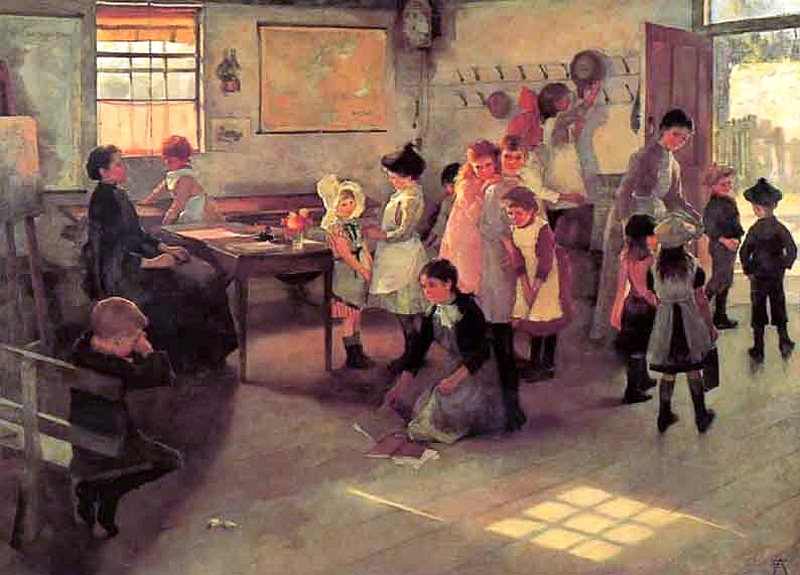
School Is Out, 1889, oil on canvas

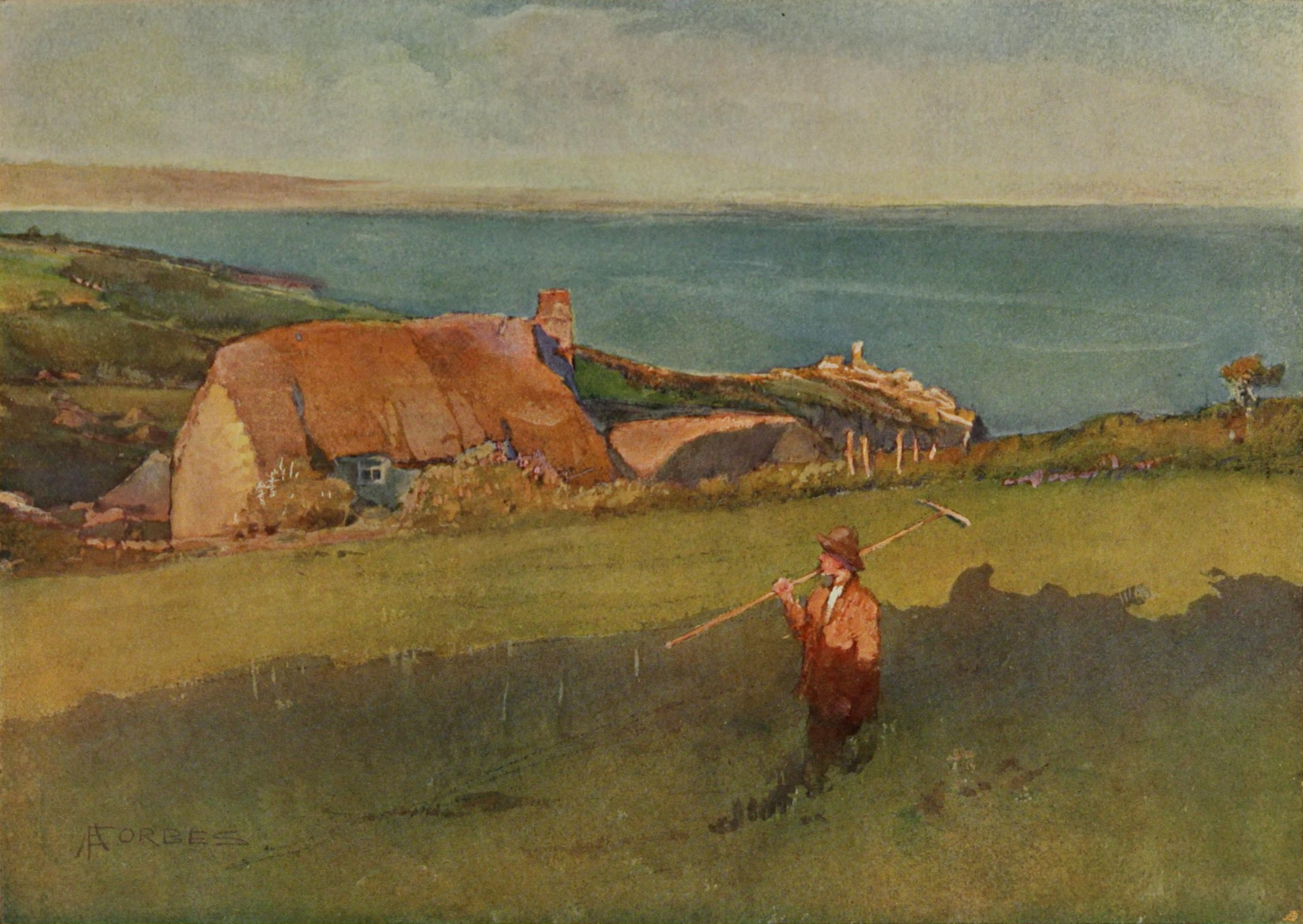
Across Mounts Bay, 1889+

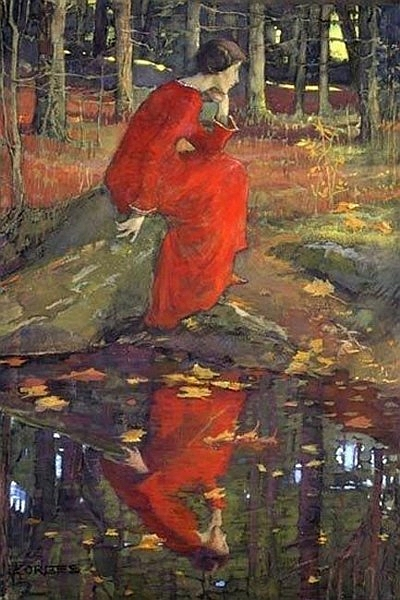
The Leaf, 1897/1898, watercolour on paper

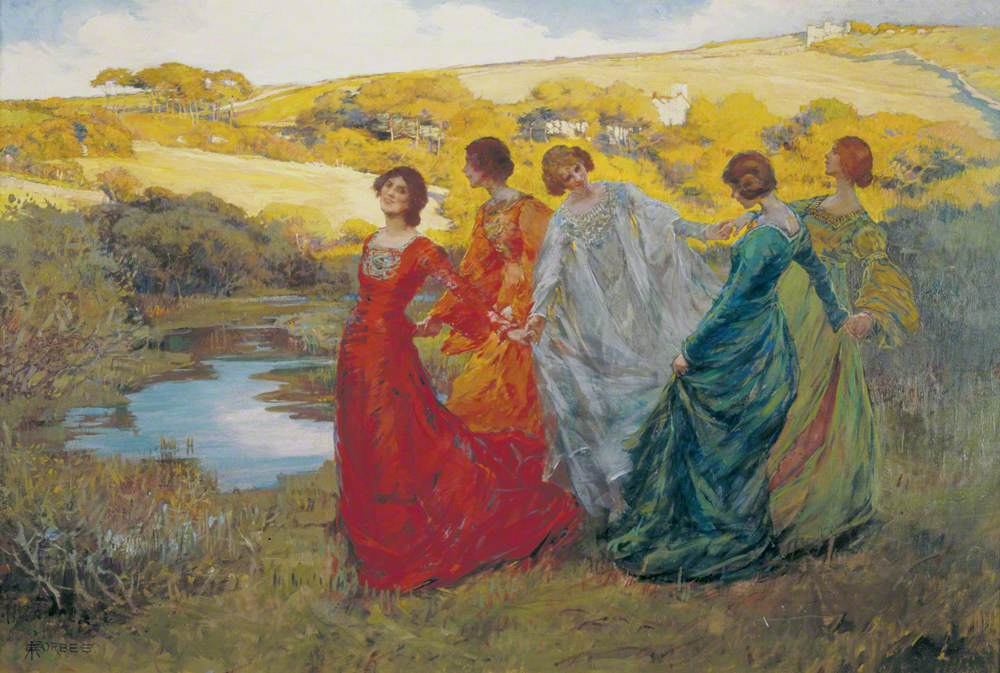
On a Fine Day, 1903, oil on canvas, Guildhall Art Gallery

Elizabeth Adela Forbes (née Armstrong; 29 December 1859 – 16 March 1912) was a Canadian painter who was primarily active in the UK. She often featured children in her paintings and School Is Out (painted in Newlyn) is one of her most popular works. She was friends with the artists James Abbott McNeill Whistler and Walter Sickert, both of whom influenced her work. Her etchings in particular are said to show the influence of Whistler.

After studying and working in continental Europe, Forbes settled in Newlyn, England, where she raised her son and established a school with her husband, Stanhope Forbes. She had her works exhibited in notable shows and won medals for her works. Her paintings are in collections of museums in Canada, United States and England.

== Personal life ==
Armstrong was born 29 December 1859 in Kingston, Canada West. She was the youngest child of William Armstrong, an employee of the government of the United Province of Canada. Born in her father's old age, she was educated privately in Canada and then allowed to further her artistic studies in England with her mother as chaperone. Her father died two months later, after which she and her mother lived with an uncle in Chelsea, London. They lived next door to Dante Gabriel Rossetti, but she never met him.

In 1889, she married Newlyn School painter Stanhope Forbes. Their son, Alec, was born in 1893. In 1904, she and her husband settled at Higher Faugan, a house which they designed and had built for themselves.

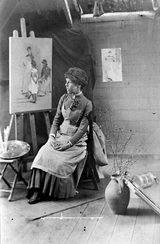
Forbes in her studio, about 1890

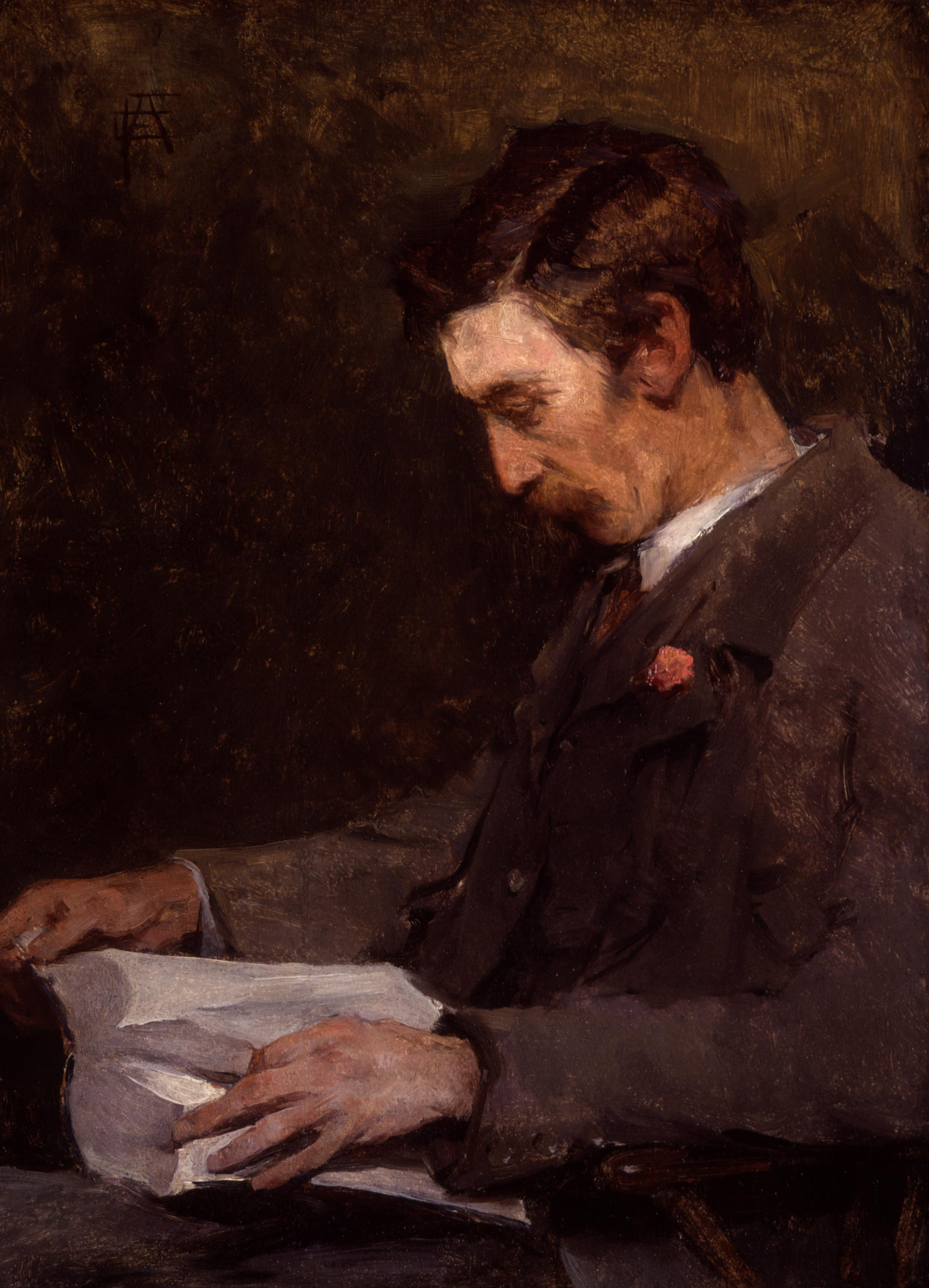
Stanhope Alexander Forbes, before 1912

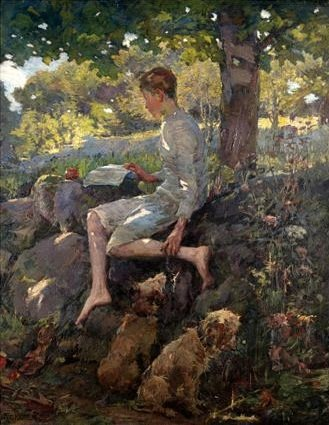
The Half Holiday, Alec home from school

In 1909, she pursued cures and restorative periods for cancer in France and London, but died in 1912. In an obituary, she was dubbed "the Queen of Newlyn" for her contributions to the art colony. Her husband remarried following her death.

== Education ==
As a young girl, Elizabeth Armstrong, later Forbes, traveled with her mother to England and studied at the South Kensington Art School (now the Royal College of Art). She then returned to Canada, during which time her father died. From 1877 to 1880 she studied at the Art Students League of New York with William Merritt Chase, who recommended that she next study in Munich. Following his advice, Armstrong went to Germany and studied with J. Frank Currier and Frank Duveneck in the early 1880s.

== Career ==
=== Early career and further education ===
In 1882, she explored plein air painting at the artists' colony at Pont-Aven in Brittany. She also taught etching there. While in Brittany, she sent paintings to London for sale at the Royal Institute and all of the items that she sent were sold on the opening day of the show. The following year, she was in London, where she worked as a print maker and joined the Society of Painter Etchers. In the summer of 1884 she studied near Haarlem in Zandvoort, the Netherlands with William Merritt Chase.

She worked in oil, watercolour and pastels and made etchings of children, landscapes and fishing scenes. Her works were exhibited in London at the Royal Institute of Painters in Water Colours and the Royal Academy. Some of her etchings, influenced by James Abbott McNeill Whistler and Walter Sickert, were collected by her Pont-Aven mentor, Mortimer Menpes.

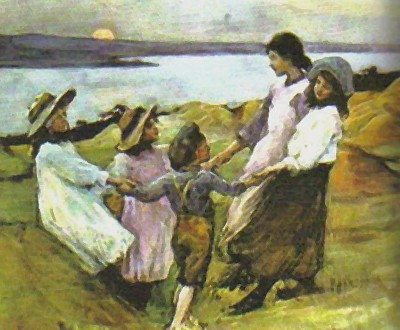
Ring a Ring O'Roses, 1880, oil on canvas

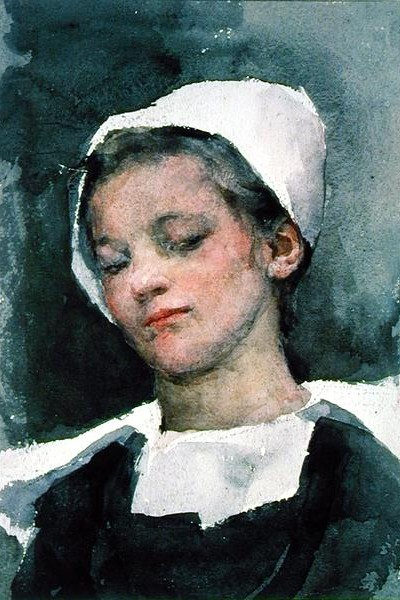
Breton Girl, Louise, 1880s, watercolour

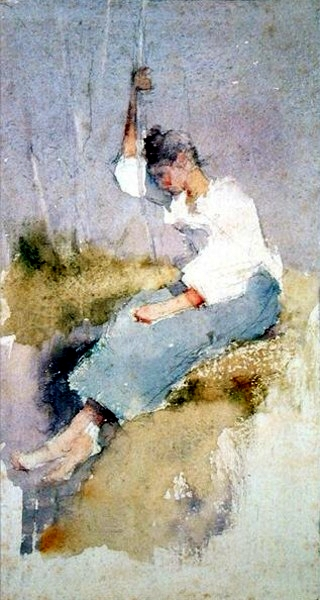
Louise, Breton Girl, 1880s, watercolour

=== Cornwall ===
In the autumn of 1885, Armstrong and her mother moved to Newlyn, Cornwall. She established a studio in Newlyn, sharing the building with a fisherman who stored and repaired nets in the space. She won a medal at the Paris International Exhibition in 1891 and a gold medal for an oil painting at the World's Columbian Exposition in Chicago in 1893. Between 1893 and 1899 she participated in more than 63 exhibitions in London.

After Newlyn, Armstrong lived in St. Ives, where she met Stanhope Forbes, whom she married in 1889. Going against societal roles for married women, Elizabeth Forbes continued to be an active and successful artist after marriage. Further, in 1899 she and her husband opened the Newlyn Art School. They were instrumental in the creation and ongoing success of the new Passmore Edwards Art Gallery at Newlyn, also known as the Newlyn Art Gallery (NAG). Her works of art, many of them of children, including her son Alec, were influenced by French realism. She was a successful artist, more successful than some of her male counterparts, and had a national reputation, most commonly associated with the Newlyn School, or Forbes School.

The Newlyners gained popular approval because their subject matter fell into the traditional and still vital categories of Victorian genre painting. They also depicted the positive and nostalgic image of provincial life and the moral values their urban audience desired. Exterior scenes incorporating recognizable sites and local, nonprofessional models distinguished Newlyn work.

— Sally Mitchell, Victorian Britain

Forbes held an exhibition called Children and Child Lore in London at the Fine Art Society in 1900. The main character based upon her friend Thomas Cooper Gotch, Forbes wrote and illustrated King Arthur's Wood, a children's book for her son that was published in 1904. She founded The Paper Chase, edited by her friend F. Tennyson Jesse in 1908, and wrote poetry. In 1910, at the Royal British Colonial Society of Artists Exhibition, Forbes won the merit award.

Following her death, her works were shown in 1990 to 1991 in the "Four Centuries of Women's Art: The National Museum of Women in the Arts" exhibition and a retrospective of her works held at the Penlee House Gallery and Museum in 2000 entitled "Singing from the Walls: The life and work of Elizabeth Forbes."

== Works ==
A partial list of her works includes:

- A Dream Princess, 1897, Royal Cornwall Museum, Truro
- An Old Dame of Pont Aven, drypoint etching, example at Penlee Museum and the British Museum
- A Newlyn Maid, oil on canvas, Penlee Museum
- Boys with a Barrow, drypoint etching, example at Penlee Museum
- Girl Peeling Onions, drypoint etching, example at Penlee Museum and the British Museum
- Girl Peeling Onions, oil on canvas, Penlee Museum
- Portrait of Cicely Jesse, charcoal, Penlee Museum
- Portrait of the Artist, drypoint etching, example at Penlee Museum
- School Is Out, 1889, oil on canvas, Penlee Museum
- The Cornish Pasty, drypoint etching, example at Penlee Museum
- The Critics, 1886 or 1887
- The Minuet, oil on canvas, Penlee Museum
- The Pied Piper, mixed media on paper, Penlee Museum
- Zandvoort Fishergirl, 1884, oil on canvas, Penlee Museum, on loan from Newlyn Art Gallery

School Is Out and Zandvoort Fishergirl were two of her best known paintings.

Her works are exhibited at National Gallery of Canada, National Museum of Women in the Arts in Washington, D.C., Royal Cornwall Museum, Penlee House, Victoria and Albert Museum, West Cornwall Art Archive and in museums in Liverpool, London and Manchester.

== Gallery ==
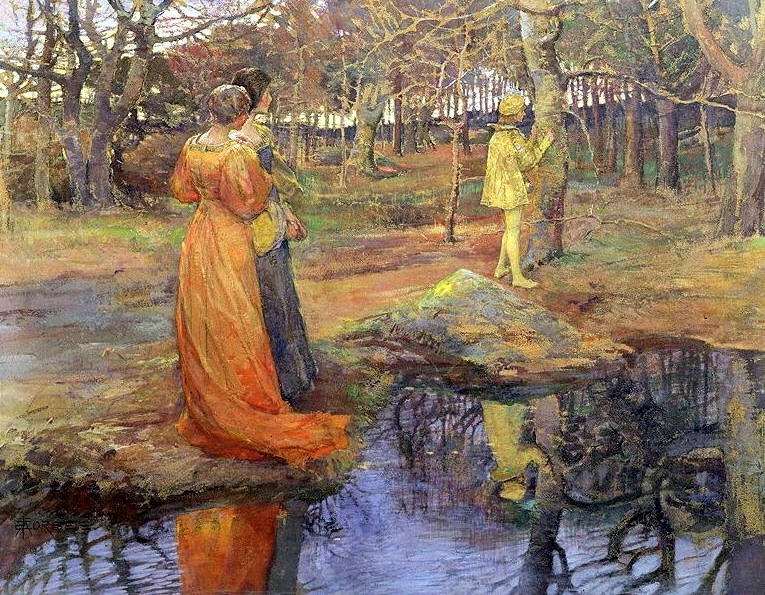
Medieval Woodland Scene, 1885

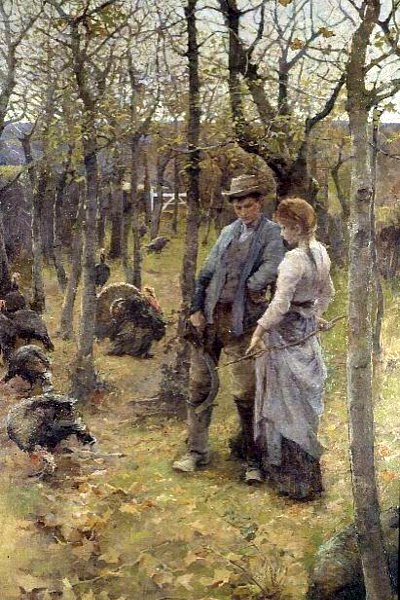
The Edge of the Wood, 1894, oil on canvas

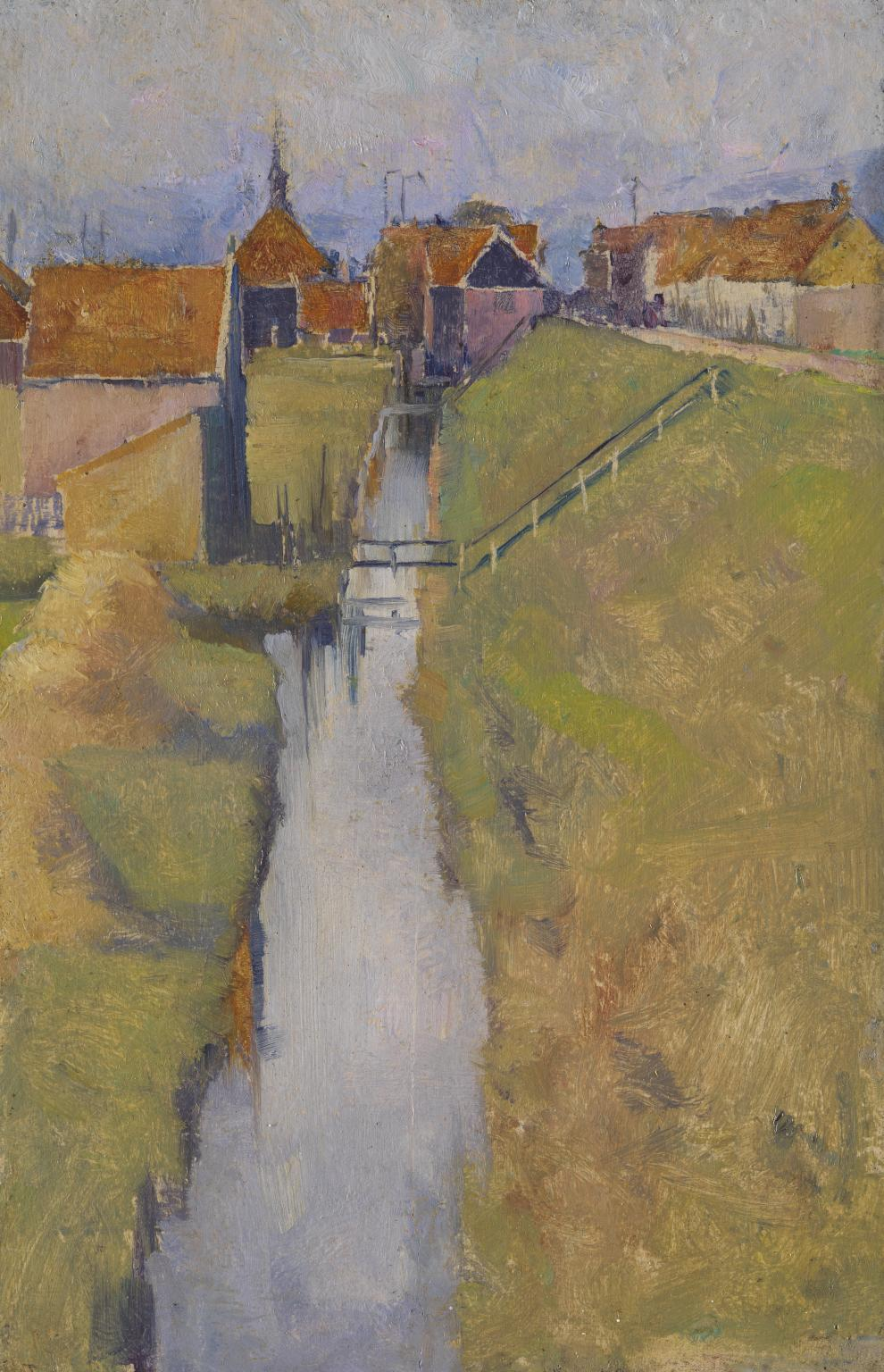
Volendam, Holland, from the Zuidende, perhaps 1895, oil on wood, Tate Gallery

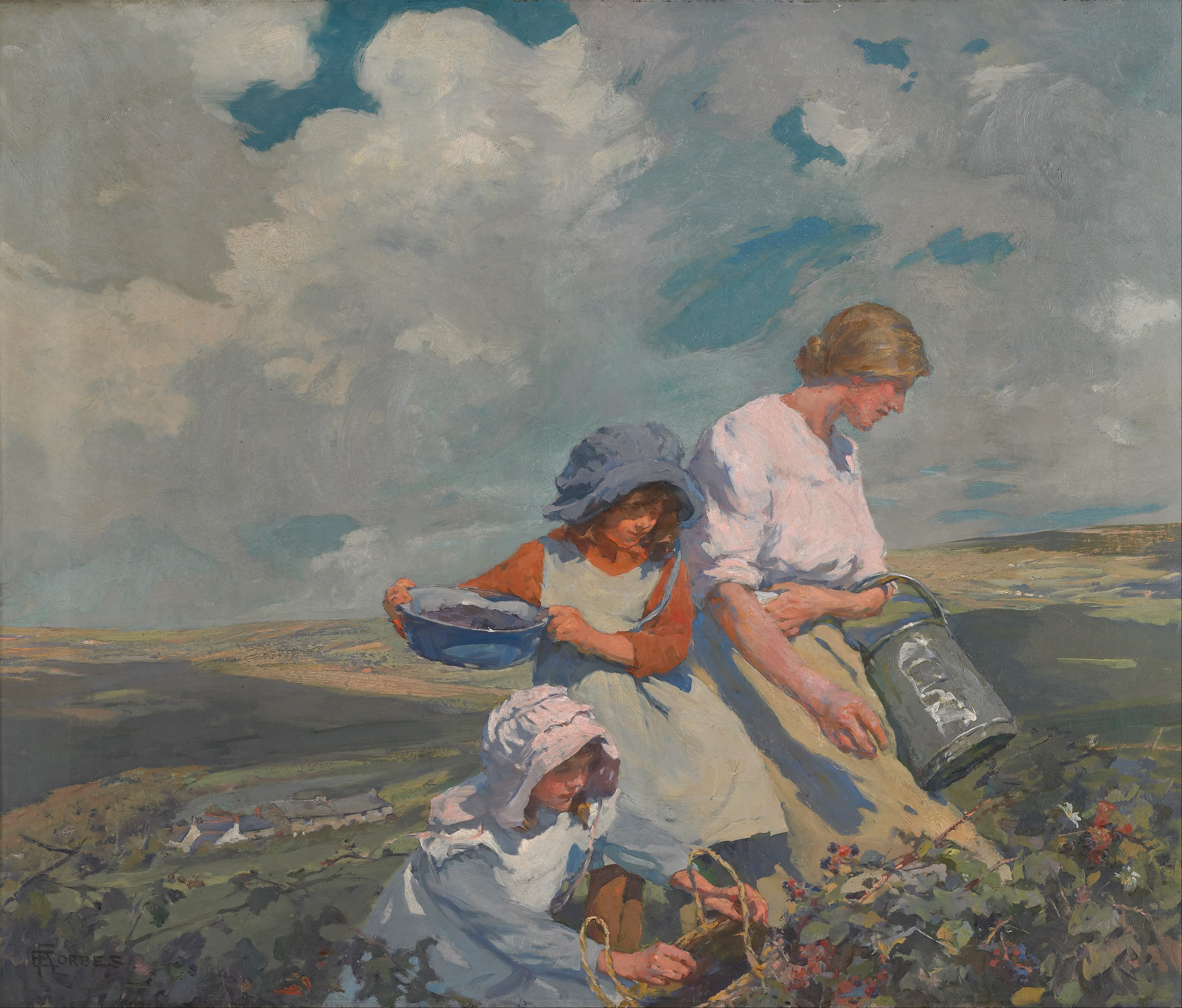
Blackberry Gathering, 1912, oil on canvas
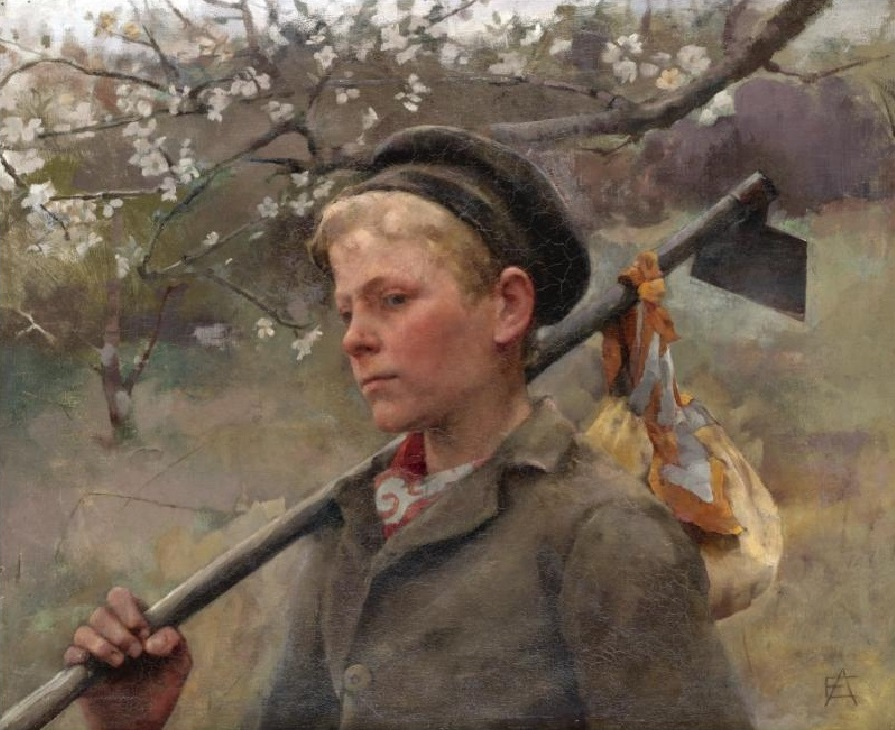
April, oil on canvas

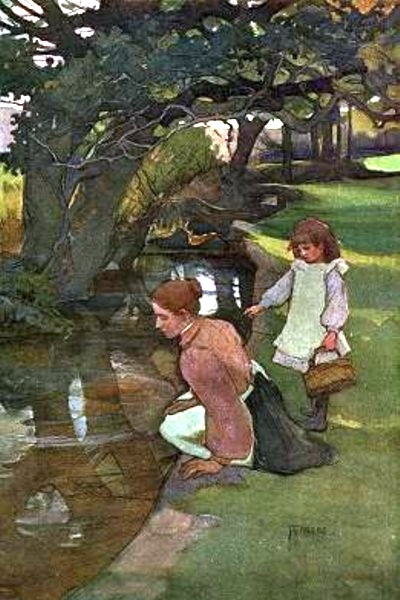
By the Brook, oil on canvas

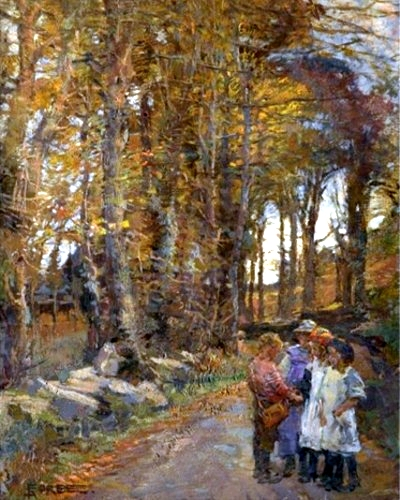
In the Lane, oil on canvas

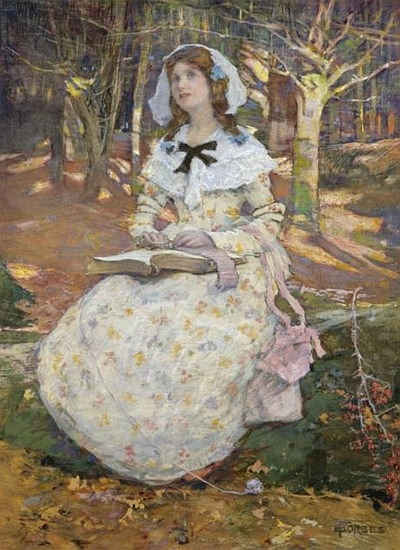
The Open Book, watercolour with bodycolour over pencil
