= Penlee House =

Museum and art gallery in Cornwall, UK

Penlee House Gallery and Museum
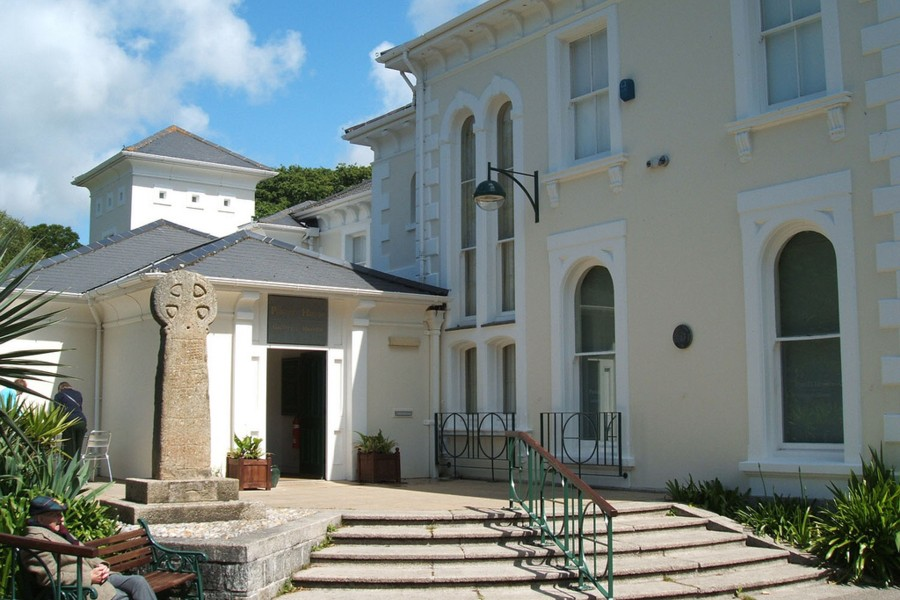
- Penlee House & Cross

- Location within Southwest Cornwall

General information
- Location: Penzance, Cornwall, England
- Coordinates: 50°6′59″N 5°32′28″W

Penlee House is a museum and art gallery in the town of Penzance, Cornwall, home to many paintings by members of the Newlyn School, including The Rain It Raineth Every Day by Norman Garstin, School is Out by Elizabeth Forbes, Among the Missing by Walter Langley and On Paul Hill by Stanhope Forbes. It is operated by Penzance Town Council in association with Cornwall Council.

== History ==
Penlee House was originally built in 1865 as the home of the wealthy Branwell family under the directions of John Richards Branwell. The house and gardens were described in The Cornishman as "delightful" and a "perfect picture", though Branwell owned the newspaper.) On his death in 1902, one of his daughter's, Edith looked after the estate and house, and on her death in 1918, it passed to her elder brother, Alfred. Following Alfred's death in 1939, the property passed to his two daughters, Mrs Vera Hancock and Mrs Sybil Ferguson who sold the house and estate to Penzance Borough Council in 1946. The council purchased Penlee Park as a memorial to the dead of World War II and Penlee House was formally opened as the Penzance District Museum in 1949. In 1974, the ownership of the museum and park passed to Penwith District Council, and since 1985, Penzance Town Council owns and operates the site.

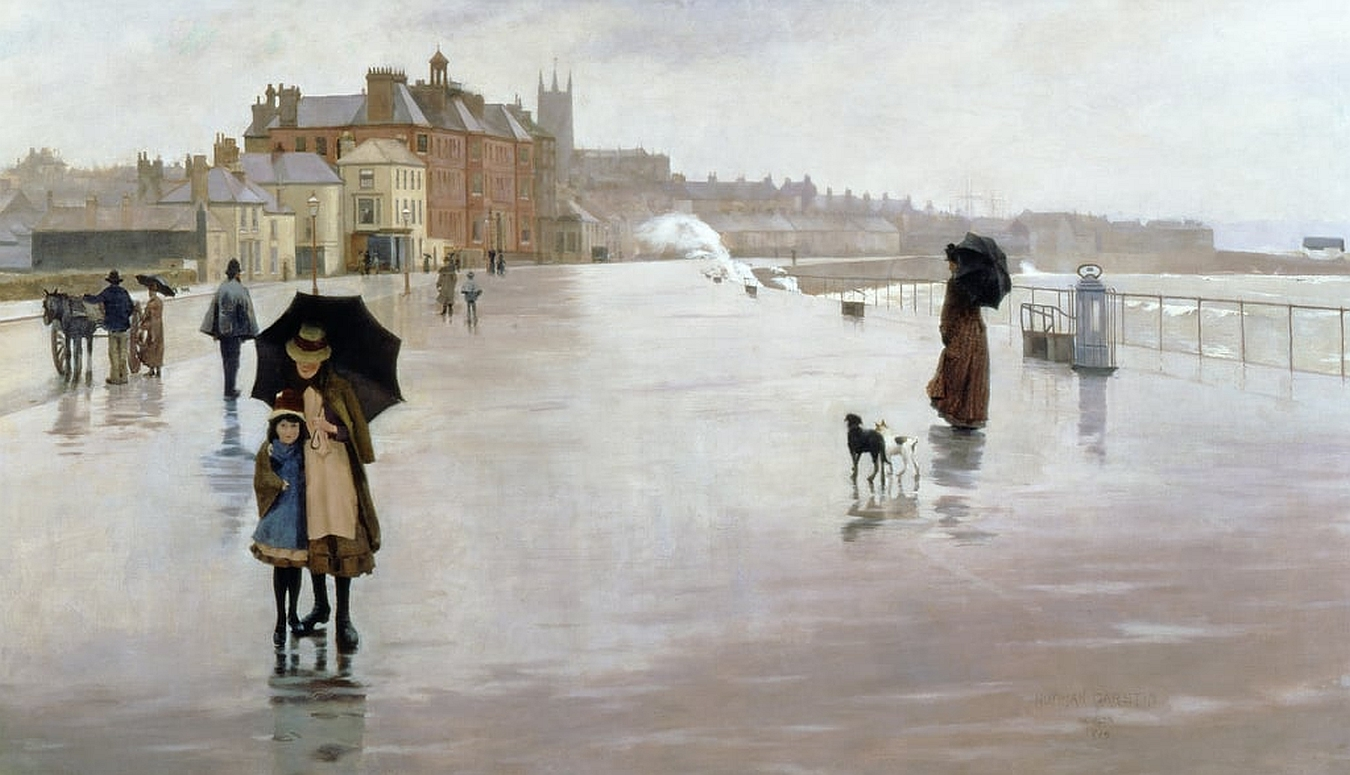
The painting was sent to the Royal Academy in 1889 but was not hung. It is believed that the committee thought the painting too 'French' in style. When the painting first came into the possession of Penzance Town Council, it was not displayed as it was decided that tourists would be put off by the depiction of Penzance in the rain. Nowadays, it is one of the most popular works in the collection.

The collections housed within the museum were originally taken from what remained of the Penzance Natural History and Antiquarian Society collection (founded in 1839) which was originally housed within the dome of the Market House in Penzance. During the 1990s, Penzance Town Council conducted a major refurbishment of the building providing up to date facilities for housing its important and historic art collection. On the first floor, there are rooms dedicated to the archaeology and social history of the Penwith (Land's End) peninsula.

In 1860, J. R. Branwell began a series of land purchases on the Western outskirts of Penzance with the intention of providing a site for his new home and a large park to surround it. During the refurbishment of Penlee House in 1997 a stair tread was found with handmade nails marked with the year 1864, which confirms that the house was under construction in that year.

The parkland surrounding Penlee House was laid out with formal and informal gardens and a lodge was built at the Trewithen Road end of the park. When the house was first built, Morrab Road was not in existence and the Penlee House Estate directly bordered onto the Morrab House Estate, the home of Charles Campbell Ross MP, which later became Morrab Library and Morrab Gardens.

Penlee House originally contained three reception rooms, a dining room, breakfast room and drawing room, with a scullery kitchen, butler’s pantry, dairy and office. The first floor was approached by a formal staircase from the hall which is still in existence, and via a servants’ staircase. There were three main bedrooms, including separate bedrooms for J.R. Branwell and his wife. A small dressing room and a large bathroom were approached through the main bedroom. There were a further four small bedrooms which over the years were used by members of the family or as servant accommodation and later as junk rooms/storage.

In 1946, the estate was purchased by public subscription to be a War Memorial which would also house the Town’s historic and art collections. The house opened as the District Museum in 1949 with further refurbishment taking place in 1974. In more recent years the building has been completely refurbished, but every attempt has been made to retain the character of a mid-Victorian villa.

=== Museum ===
The institution now called Penlee House was initially known as Penzance and District Museum, and was founded by the Penzance Natural History and Antiquarian Society in 1839. Its first home was in the Market House, which had just been completed. The Museum was situated in the dome of the building and contained a mixture of Natural Science, Archaeology and Ethnological artefacts – a typical antiquarian museum of the period. One visitor described it as “a mangy lot of skins and skeletons under the charge of an imbecile old man”.

In 1867, the growing Museum moved to the newly constructed St John’s Hall, the town’s main public building. By the end of the decade, the Penzance Natural History and Antiquarian Society had collapsed. The society was reformed in the mid 1880s, but as no rent had been paid for the museum premises for many years, specimens were sold to raise money and to clear the debt. Insect damage to the Natural History collection meant that much of it was subsequently destroyed.

The Museum remained in St John’s Hall until 1947. The society sold the collections to Penzance Borough Council in 1937 for a nominal sum, with an agreement that they would be displayed for the public good. 1939 saw the collections put into storage and unfortunately many items subsequently disappeared. No record of the Museum’s extensive Egyptian collection can be found. Also missing is a Bronze Age gold torc, and more unusual items such as the hand of a Mummy with a gold signet ring, a shrunken head and poisoned arrows.

At the end of World War II, the owners of the Penlee Estate were planning to build on the land and to demolish the house. The then Mayor, Robert Thomas, decided to open a public appeal and purchase the estate as a War Memorial. The estate is about 15 acres, and the purchase price was £13,000. It was decided to use the house as a museum and arts centre, plus two domestic council dwellings.

The Museum was opened in its new home by Sir Cyril Fox on 24th June 1949. It was administered by the Borough Librarian from 1949 until 1974, when Penzance lost its borough status and the Museum became the property of Penwith District Council. In 1985, ownership of the Penlee Estate reverted back to Penzance Town Council.

In the 1990s, substantial funding was raised from various sources, including the Heritage Lottery Fund, the European Regional Development Fund, Penwith District Council, Penzance Town Council and the Friends of Penlee House, to refurbish and develop the Museum and Art Gallery. Overseen by Robert Allen, architect, the building was completely redeveloped, adding gallery spaces, lift access and the cafe and shop, as well as refurbishing the museum. Care was taken to preserve the feel of the original genteel Victorian home, while providing state-of-the-art conditions for the display and care of the collections.

Founded in 1839, the museum collections cover 6000 years of history in west Cornwall, from Penwith’s awe-inspiring archaeological sites to the area’s more recent social history. The recently refurbished social history gallery houses a wealth of artefacts covering the area’s fascinating and often quirky heritage.

The Social History and Archaeology galleries show how people have lived and worked in West Cornwall for thousands of years. The galleries include Bronze Age jewellery found locally, 1930s fashion, historical artefacts and curiosities.

== Cross ==
The large granite cross outside the museum dates from the 11th century and has been moved on at least three occasions, its original location being the Green Market in Penzance. While this cross was in the Greenmarket it formed the accepted measurement point for the then Borough of Penzance, all settlements within a half-mile of the cross being reckoned within the control of the said Borough and subject to associated local government taxation. It was moved from the Green Market in 1829 a short distance to a house in North Street (Causewayhead); on the demolition of this house (ca. 1868), the cross was then moved to a position at the western end of the Market House.

In July 1899, it was moved to Morrab Gardens and moved again in 1953 to Penlee Park. On 23 September 1997, the cross was erected at its present position by the new entrance to Penlee House. All four sides of the cross can be examined. The height is 2.07 m; width of head 0.685 m; width of shaft at base 0.635 m; width of shaft at neck 0.495 m; thickness 0.265 m

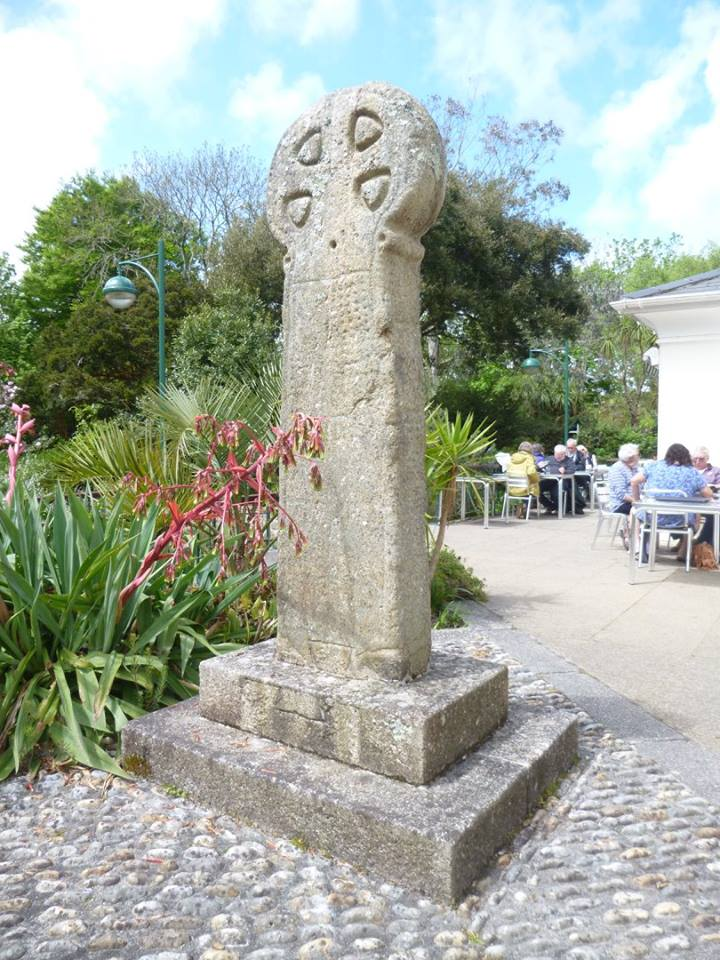
Old Central Cross – moved to Penlee House Gallery and Museum, Penzance Parish

== Newlyn School paintings ==
Penlee House is home to a great many paintings by members of the Newlyn School. The area’s spectacular scenery has attracted visiting artists since the early 19th century. In the 1880s, numerous British painters began to arrive in Newlyn, many of whom had trained in Paris or Antwerp. Newlyn offered scenes and lives scarcely touched by the industrial revolution, with plentiful, cheap accommodation and willing models. Soon, a host of artists settled, forming the colony known as the Newlyn School.

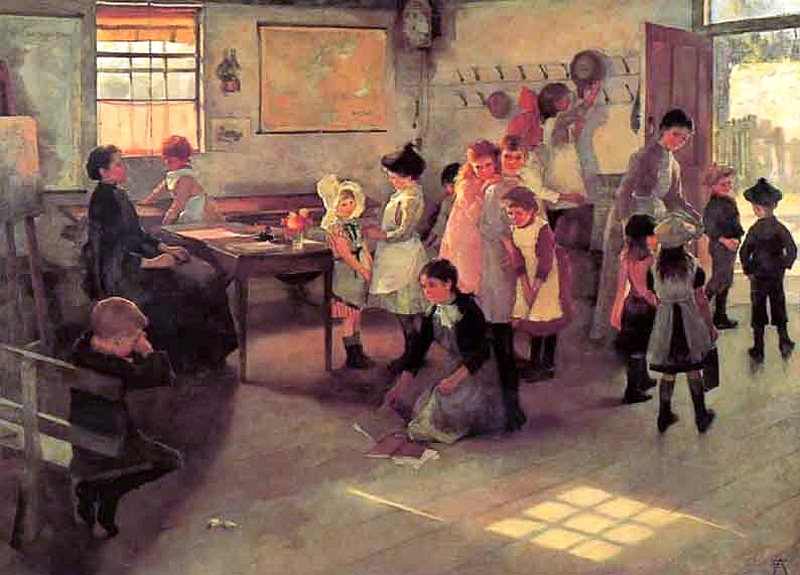
School Is Out, by Elizabeth Adela Forbes, depicts the schoolroom in the small village of Paul, just outside Newlyn. It was painted in 1889, shortly before Elizabeth's marriage to Stanhope Forbes. In 1904 she exhibited works at the Leicester Gallery, in an exhibition entitled 'Children and Child Lore'.

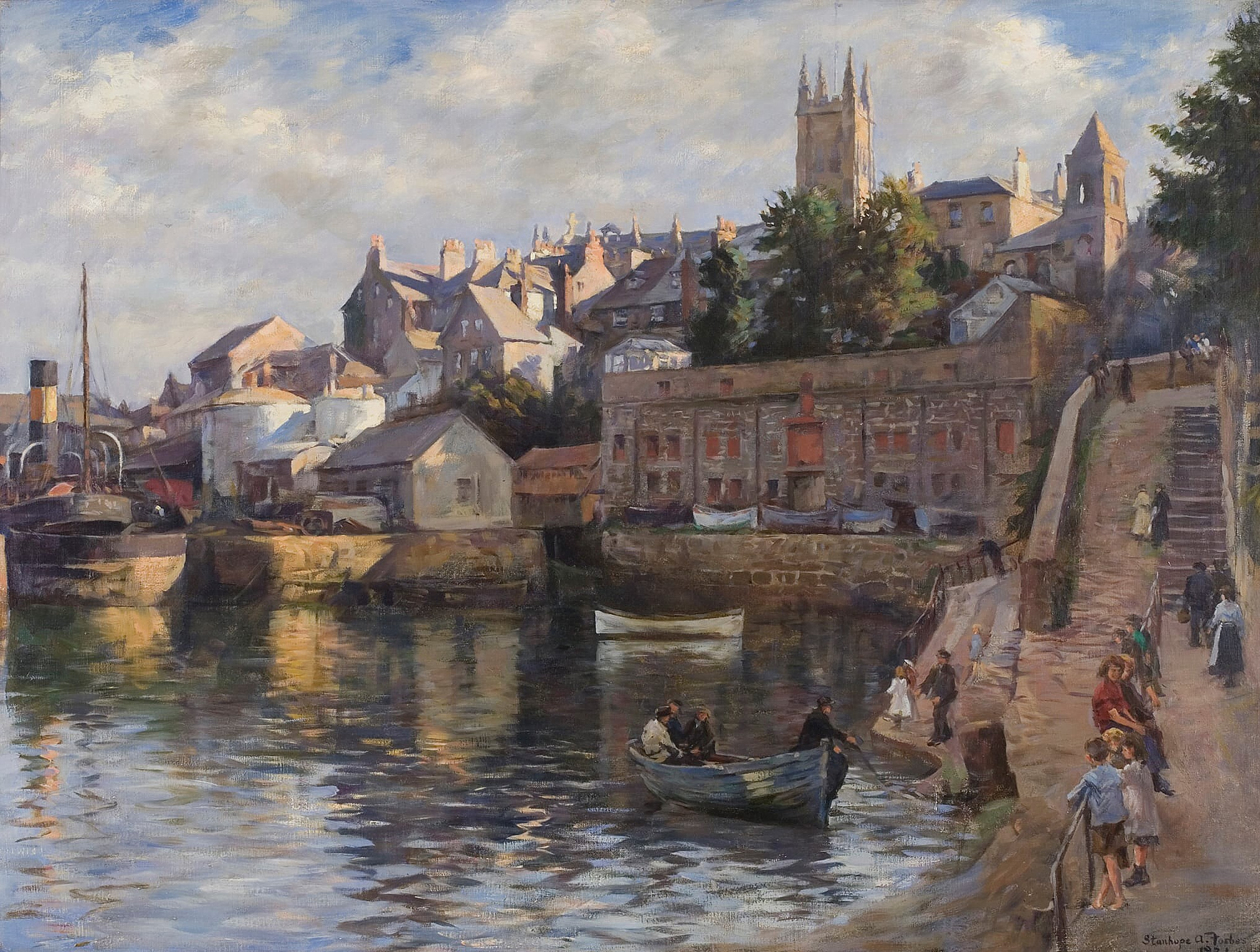
Abbey Slip by Stanhope Forbes: a view of Abbey Basin and slipway with the dry dock on the left and St Mary's Church in the background.

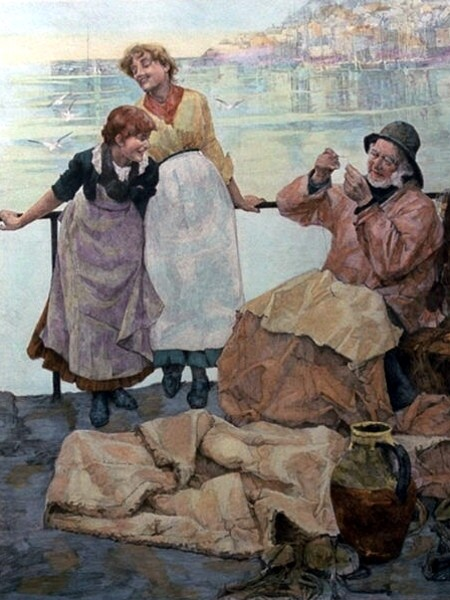
Eyes and No Eyes by Frank Bramley depicts a fisherman trying to thread a needle in order to mend sails. Two young women leaning against the rail laughing at him because he can't see to do it. Newlyn harbour in the background. A great example of 'plein air' painting and 'square brush' technique.
