= Newlyn School =

Art colony around Newlyn in Cornwall

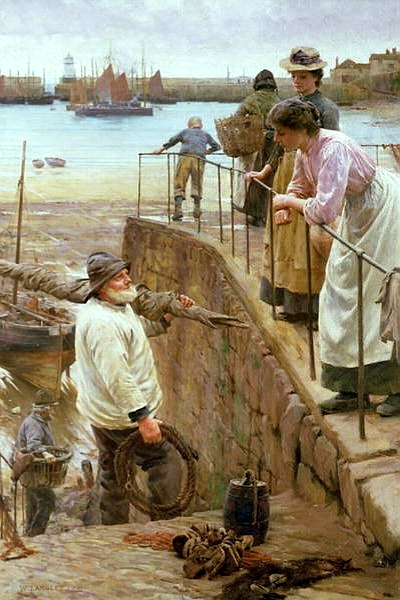
Walter Langley, Between the Tides, 1901

The Newlyn School is the term used for a group of artists with a shared passion for painting the realities of life, who were mainly based within the art colony at Newlyn, a fishing village adjacent to Penzance, on the south coast of Cornwall, from the 1880s until the early twentieth century. The establishment of the Newlyn School was reminiscent of the Barbizon School in France, where artists fled Paris to paint in a more pure setting emphasising natural light. The artists of both these Schools often painted en plein air (in the open air, in front of the scenes they were depicting).

There were two distinct 'flowerings' of the Newlyn School. The first group, from the 1880s to the dawn of the 1900s, consisted of artists intent on capturing the everyday life in a relatively poor, if certainly picturesque, village. The handling of paint was often loose and free, sometimes coming to approach Impressionism, and with a similar concern with capturing the effects of light.

In 1899, when artists had started to move away both artistically and geographically, Stanhope Forbes and his equally talented wife Elizabeth Forbes set up the Newlyn School of Painting to re-energise the artists colony, bringing a whole new generation into the area. This group worked in a different style, but was no less unified than the first. It included Dame Laura Knight, Harold Knight, Harold Harvey, Dod Procter and Sir Alfred Munnings.

== History ==
Some of the first British artists to settle in the area had previously travelled in Brittany, but found in Newlyn a comparable English environment with a number of things guaranteed to attract them: fantastic light, cheap living, and the availability of inexpensive models. The artists were fascinated by the fishermen's working life at sea and the everyday life in the harbour and nearby villages. Some paintings showed the hazards and tragedy of the community's life, such as women anxiously looking out to sea as the boats go out, or a young woman crying on hearing news of a disaster. Walter Langley is generally recognised as the pioneer of the Newlyn art colony and Stanhope Forbes, who settled there in 1884, as the father of it. The local newspaper (The Cornishman) was positive about the artists, reporting that the area had much to thank them for ″... circulating money, ...″, and ″... are ever ready to assist in anything which pertains to the welfare of the town.″

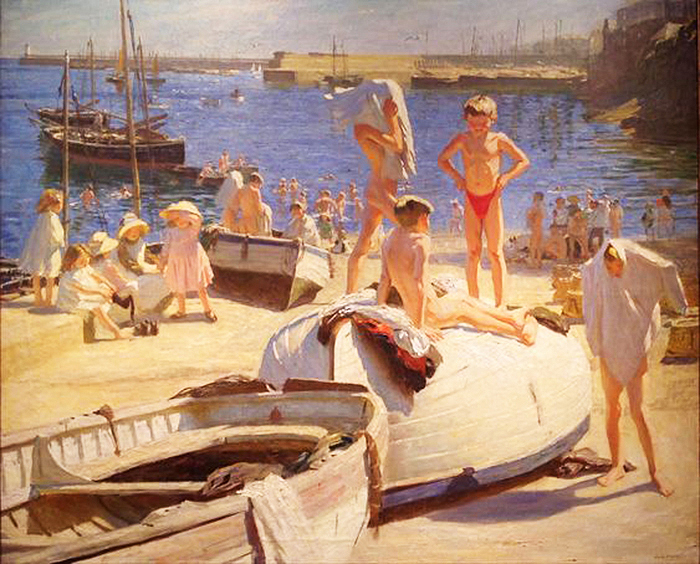
Laura Knight, Boys, 1910, set in Cornwall

In the late nineteenth and early twentieth centuries, Lamorna, a wooded valley leading to a small harbour to the west of Newlyn, became popular with artists of the Newlyn School and is particularly associated with the landscape painter S J "Lamorna" Birch who lived there from 1908. In 1908 the colony received a considerable boost when Laura Knight and her husband Harold Knight moved to Newlyn, and later Lamorna, becoming key figures in the later stages of the group. They had previously been an important part of the Staithes group, a similar colony based in a fishing village south of Newcastle-on-Tyne.

The Forbes School of Painting was founded by Forbes and his wife Elizabeth in 1899, and promoted the study of figure painting. A present-day Newlyn School of Art was formed in 2011 with Arts Council funding providing art courses taught by many of the best-known artists working in Cornwall today.

== Member artists ==
Newlyn School painters include:

*Lamorna Birch
- Frank Bramley
- Marjorie Frances Bruford
- Elizabeth Forbes
- Stanhope Forbes
- Norman Garstin
- Caroline Gotch
- Thomas Cooper Gotch
- Frederick Hall
- Edwin Harris
- Gertrude Harvey
- Harold Harvey
- Eleanor Hughes
- Harold Knight
- Laura Knight
- Walter Langley
- Alfred Munnings
- Dod Procter
- Charles Simpson
- Ruth Simpson
- Albert Chevallier Tayler
- Henry Scott Tuke
- Annie Walke née Fearon

For a full list see: George Bednar. Every Corner was a Picture: A checklist compiled for the West Cornwall Art Archive of 50 artists from the early Newlyn School painters through to the present. ISBN 1-872229-36-0

== Gallery ==
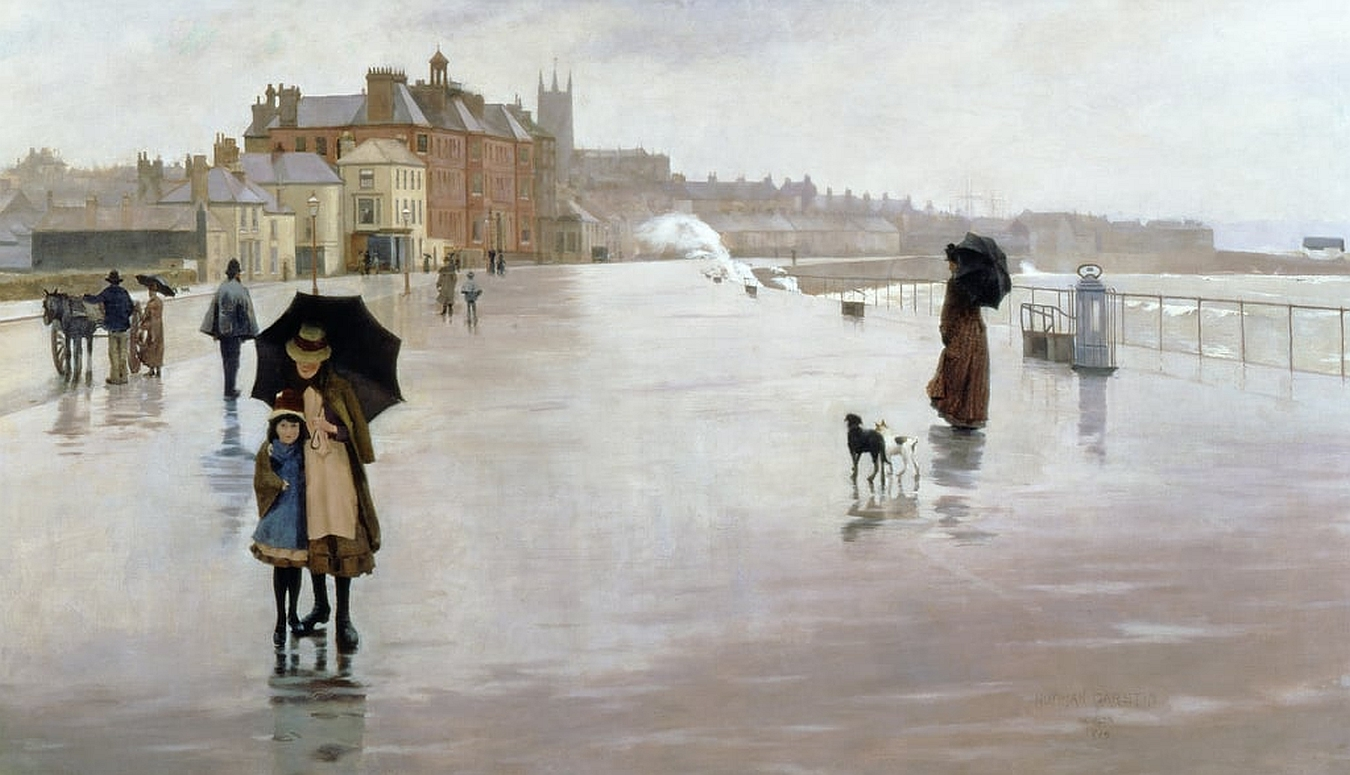
The Rain It Raineth Every Day by Norman Garstin, 1889

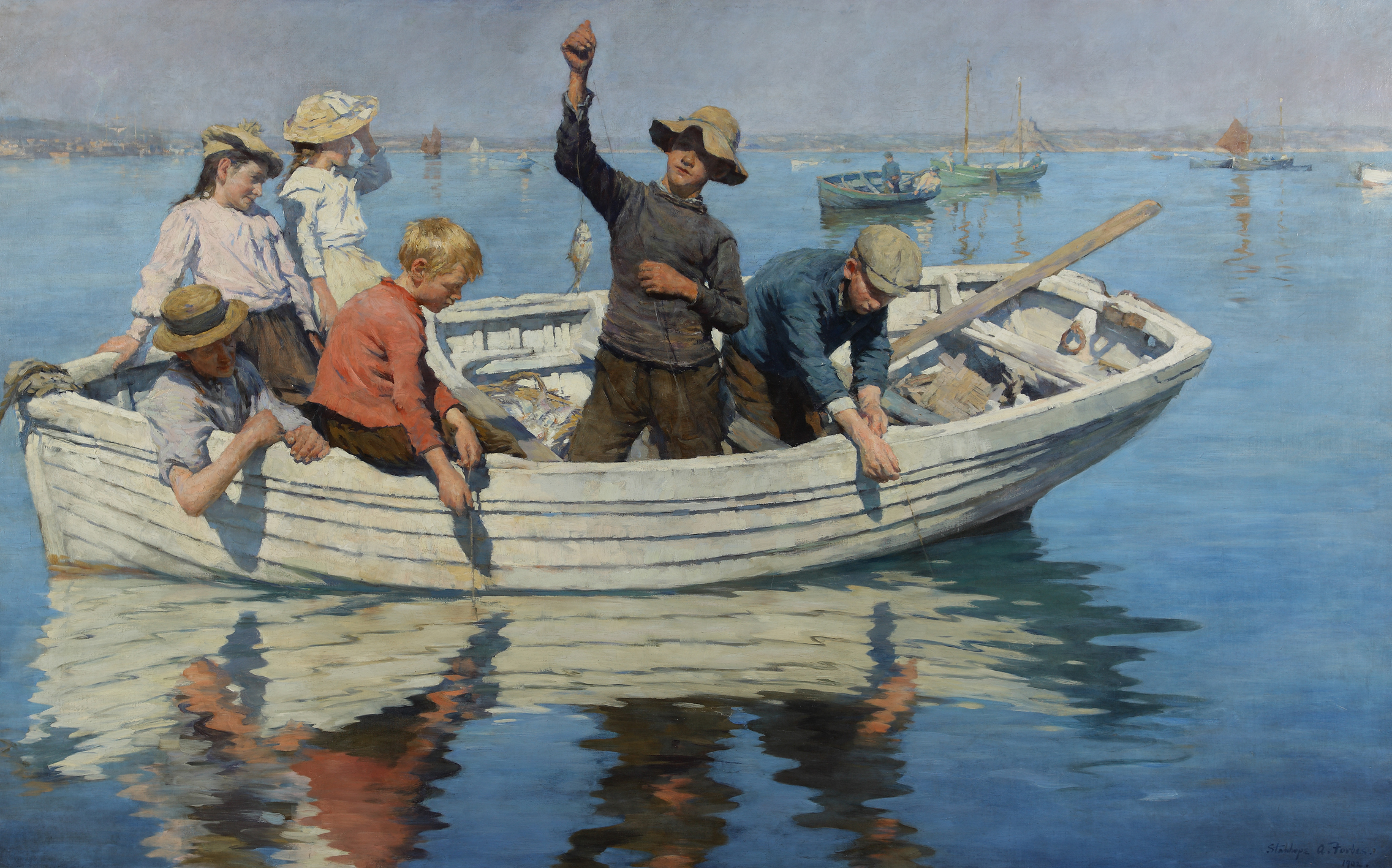
Chadding in Mount's Bay by Stanhope Forbes, 1902

Gala Day at Newlyn by Stanhope Forbes, 1907

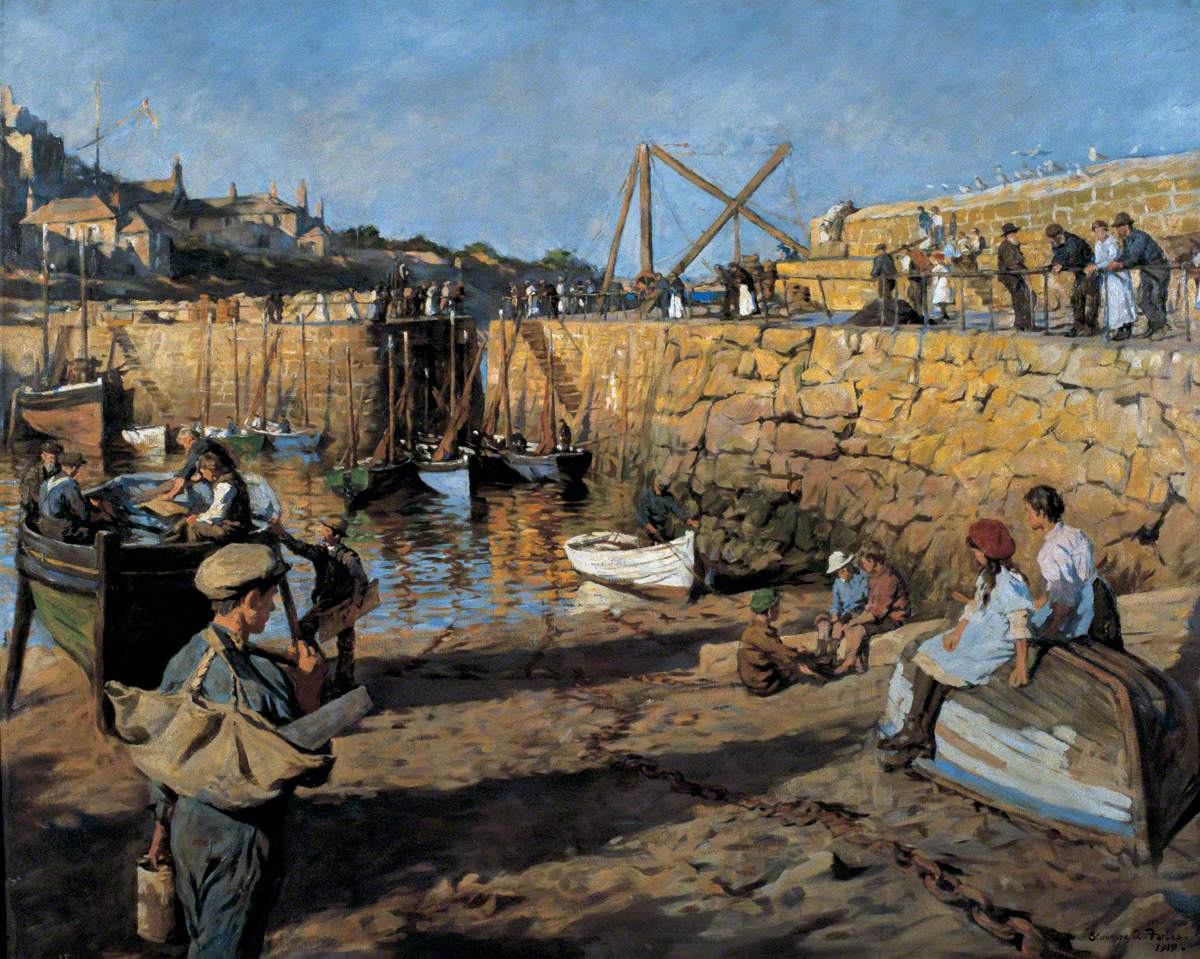
Fitting Out, Mousehole Harbour by Stanhope Forbes, 1919

My Kitchen by Harold Harvey, 1923
