= Gallun =

Gallun is a surname. Notable people with the surname include:

- Albert F. Gallun (1865–1938), American businessman
- August F. Gallun (1834–1912), German-born American businessman
- Raymond Z. Gallun (1911–1994), American science fiction writer
