= Mary Jewels =

British painter

- Born: 5 February 1886; Newlyn, United Kingdom
- Died: 1977 (aged 89–90)
- Known for: Painting
- Movement: Naïve art

Mary Jewels (5 February 1886–1977) was a British painter, born in Newlyn in Cornwall.

Jewels never had any formal training and painted in a naïve style, mainly landscapes, portraits, fishing and harbour scenes in oil. She was a friend of artist Dod Procter, and her sister Cordelia was married to the sculptor Frank Dobson. She was widowed by 1918 and was encouraged to paint by Cedric Morris. She gained national attention after Augustus John convinced her to exhibit her works in London in 1928.
