= Henry Richardson Procter =

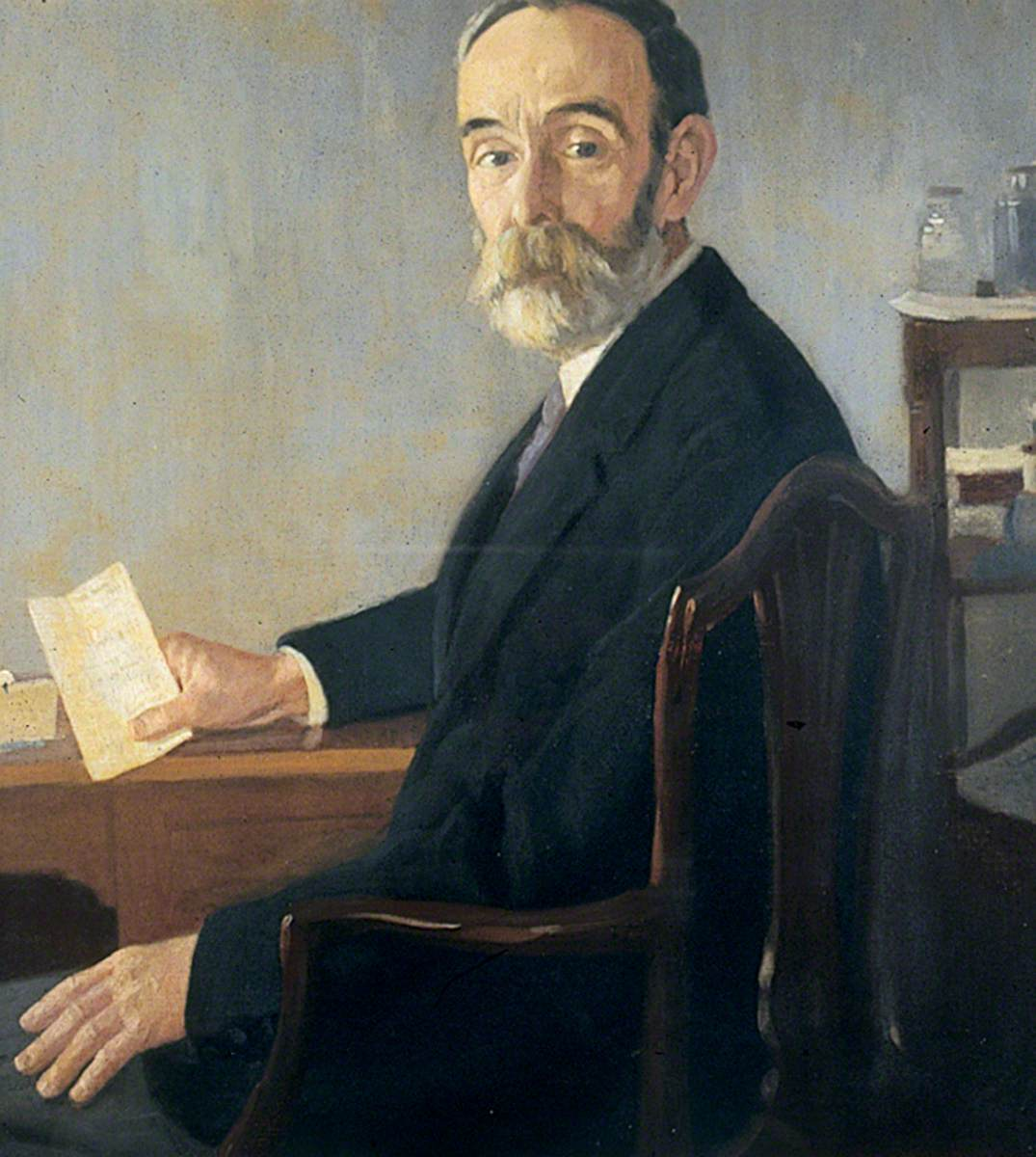
Henry Richardson Procter, portrait by Ernest Procter

Henry Richardson Procter (1848–1927) was an English chemist, known as an authority on the chemistry of leather, with a family background of several generations of Quaker tanners in northern England. He was elected a Fellow of the Royal Society in 1923.

== Life ==
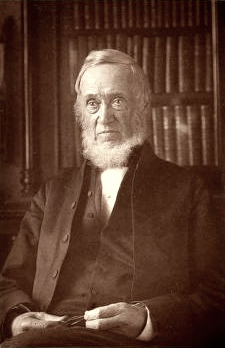
John Richardson Procter (1812–1888)

He was born at Low Lights, North Shields on 8 May 1848, the son of John Richardson Procter (1812–1888) and his wife Lydia Richardson. Both his parents came from Quaker families in the leather industry, and they were second cousins: Lydia's paternal grandfather was Isaac Richardson (1738–1791) who owned the Cherryhill tanyard at York and was the younger brother of John Richardson Procter's maternal grandfather John Richardson (1733–1800), who owned a tanyard at Low Lights.

Procter was educated at Bootham School. He was then apprenticed to his father. He studied at the Royal College of Chemistry for a period to 1871. During this period in London he had experience, as a volunteer intern, of working with Edward Frankland and Norman Lockyer.

Records are extant of experimental work on tanning Procter carried out at the family tannery, Low Lights, North Shields, from 1877 to 1887. Procter and Wilhelm Eitner in Vienna are considered pioneers in the chemistry of the tanning of leather. Eitner set up an institute in 1874. On his father's death in 1888, Procter closed down the Low Lights tannery.

Procter then worked for three years for Edward & James Richardson, a leather products firm at Elswick, Newcastle run by cousins, brought in by its manager David Richardson (1835–1913). In 1891 he joined the Yorkshire College of Science at Leeds and founded its leather science teaching as a lecturer. There he became Professor of Applied Chemistry, later Emeritus. His retirement in 1913 was marked by the establishment of the Procter International Research Laboratory. The Leeds College and University had a Procter Professor for Leather Science over a long period, until in 1961 under Alan Gordon Ward the scope of the department was broadened to Food and Leather Science.

== Works ==
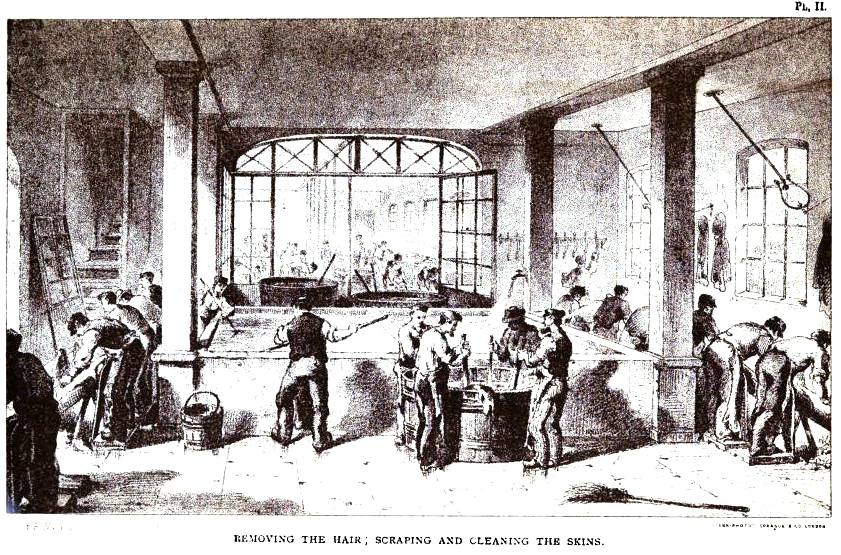
"Removing the Hair: Scraping and Cleaning the Skins", Plate II in Henry Richardson Procter, A Text-book of Tanning: A Treatise on the Conversion of Skins Into Leather (1885)

Much of Procter's research was on tannin analysis and gelatin swelling, diverse chemical topics. He gave a series of Cantor Lectures on "Leather Manufacture" in 1899 for the Society of Arts of London, and a series of Cobb Lectures in 1918 on "Recent Developments in Leather Chemistry" for the Royal Society of Arts, as it was later known. His books included:

- A Text-book of Tanning: A Treatise on the Conversion of Skins Into Leather, Both Practical and Theoretical (1885). This work concentrated on vegetable tannins, with only a cursory discussion of mineral tanning.
- The Principles of Leather Manufacture (1903)
- Leather Industries Laboratory Book of Analytical and Experimental Methods (1908)
- Leather Chemists' Pocket-book: A Short Compendium of Analytical Methods (1912)
- The Making of Leather (1914)

Procter translated with Thomas Hutchinson Waller, An Introduction to Physical Measurements (1873) by Friedrich Kohlrausch. He wrote a 1916 research paper with John Arthur Wilson, later chief chemist with A. F. Gallun & Sons; Wilson was at the Procter Research Laboratory in 1915–6; he referred to Procter in 1923 as "the father of leather chemistry".

In 1918 Procter was a member of the "Colloid Chemistry and its Industrial Applications" of the British Association for the Advancement of Science, chaired by Frederick Donnan. Using Donnan's early ideas on membranes for a "theory of vegetable tannins", Procter innovated in organic applications, and laid the ground for the work of Jacques Loeb on colloids.

== Family ==
Procter married in 1874 Emma Lindsay Watson. The couple had two sons and a daughter, the second son being the painter Ernest Procter. Emma was the seventh daughter of James Watson (1810–1861) and Mary Spence, eldest daughter of Robert Spence; they were married in 1835 at North Shields Meeting House in a double wedding, at which Mary's sister Sarah, the second daughter, married the solicitor Joseph Watson of Newcastle upon Tyne. Robert Spence Watson was the eldest son of Joseph and Sarah Watson.
