= Listed buildings in Newlyn =

Newlyn is a small town and fishing port in the civil parish of Penzance, Cornwall, United Kingdom.

Name and location	Photograph	Date	Notes	Grade
The Old Harbour Pier and Walls; 50.102321°N 5.546570°W		Before 1435	The curved pier was rebuilt in 1435 with later alterations. Built of large granite rubble with a wall on the seaward side.	II*
The Old Manor, Trewarveneth Street; 50.102554°N 5.549266°W	—	17th century	Long and low two storey building which has stuccoed rubble walls with tarred plinth. The doorway has a label mould, granite jambs and lintel, moulded, stopped with ball and diamond, fielded panel door. Three wide spaced windows have sashes. The steep slate roof has gable ends and there is a large granite end chimney stack.	II
Trewarveneth Farmhouse and adjoining barn 50.096998°N 5.551507°W	—	17th century with later alterations and additions	Stone rubble 17th-century house with 18th-century and 19th-century alterations and early 19th-century additions. The 19th-century windows have sashes in earlier openings with two on the first floor having stone surrounds. The first floor window in the east gable end has five lights with stone mullions and dripmould, the mullions removed when the later window was inserted. There is a modern bay window on the ground floor and a glazed porch. Chimney stacks are at the gable ends. The circa. early 19th-century wing to the south east has a half-hipped roof and segmental bay window of sashes. The wing forms a link to a former barn which was converted, in around 1900, to a studio for the painter Stanhope Forbes.	II
Pendower House, 12 Fradgan Place; 50.104616°N 5.550470°W	—	Late 17th century	Two storey house with rendered walls and a steep roof of new slates with gable ends. There are two wide spaced windows with two light casements. The central doorway has a modern glazed porch.	II
7 and 8 Fradgan Place; 50.104525°N 5.550721°W	—	Late 17th or early 18th century	Rubble rendered cottages with cob on the first floor and a central passageway on the ground floor with shallow gabled porches. No 8 has the date 1760 painted over the doorway. Three windows have sashes; number 7 has modern sashes and number 8 has glazing bars. The steep slate roof has gable ends and number 8 has a large attic dormer.	II
54 and 54A Fore Street; 50.101851°N 5.547005°W	—	17th/18th century	Two cottages overlooking the harbour with the upper floor slightly oversailing and a roof of slurried slates with a gable end. Three windows have sashes with vertical glazing bars. There are two recessed doorways. At the rear are buildings supported by pillars with an open ground floor around a courtyard.	II
64 and 68 Fore Street; 50.101721°N 5.546643°W		Early 18th century	One storey house with an attic. The walls are made of rubble and there is a wide central recessed doorway with panelled door. Two original 2-light casements with glazing bars on the ground floor and two late 19th-century dormers. At the rear is a picturesque yard with open outbuildings (former pilchard fishery stores), supported on rough granite pillars.	II
Art Gallery, Fore Street; 50.102831°N 5.548941°W	—	Early 18th century	The building faces the harbour and has a large 19th century splayed bay window on the first floor and a doorway under. The side elevation is on Trewarveneth Street and has a first floor sash and a ground floor small shop window with pilasters and fascia. The walls are stuccoed. There is a large side chimney stack and external stone steps to a first floor doorway with glazed porch. The steep slate roof has a half-hipped end.	II
9 Fradgan Place; 50.104601°N 5.550545°W	—	Early 18th century (probably)	Cottage with rubble walls and possible rendered cob on the first floor. There are two plain doors on the ground floor with one having a glazed conservatory around doorway and the other with a modern hood. A ground floor window has sashes and two windows on the first floor has light casements with glazing bars. The steep slate roof has gable ends.	II
29 St Peter's Hill; 50.101183°N 5.547513°W	—	Early 18th century	A two storey cottage with a two storey extension to the rear. The walls are rendered and painted and it has a replacement slate roof with gabled ends with a short brick stack to the north-east gable. There is a central entrance, on the south-east elevation, with a modern gabled porch, flanked by later sash windows. Above are two dormer windows with hipped roofs.	II
Tolcarne Inn; 50.106877°N 5.548650°W		1717	Public house with plastered granite rubble walls with a tarred plinth. The tarred slate roof has gable ends and four windows have small, irregularly spaced sashes without glazing bars. The date 1717 is inscribed on the granite lintel above the door.	II
Ebb Tide, Belle Vue; 50.102426°N 5.551694°W	—	18th century	Two storey cottage with whitewashed rubble walls and heightened first floor windows with gabled heads above the eaves. The windows have sashes. The slurried slate roof has gable ends and continues over a large truncated chimney stack at one end. The doorway is central and recessed.	II
Port Cottage, 6 Boase Street; 50.102209°N 5.548700°W	—	18th century	Two storey cottage with whitened rubble walls and slate roof with gable ends. Two windows have sliding casements with glazing bars. There is a central modern glazed door.	II
Vine Cottages, Boase Street; 50.102326°N 5.548344°W	—	18th century	Cottages, at right angles to the road with walls made of rubble and the first floor rendered. The steep roof has new slates. There are plain doorways and of the five windows, two have modern 2-light casements.	II
High Mountains, Church Street; 50.102019°N 5.548668°W	—	18th century	Two storey cottages, with roughcast walls and a slate roof with gable ends. There is a passageway to the right and two windows have restored small sashes.	II
Lyndale, Chywoone Hill; 50.105544°N 5.550804°W	—	18th century	Two storey cottage with rubble walls, end on to the road and a painted rubble wing to the rear with a passageway through to Orchard Place. Two windows have sashes with vertical glazing bars and there is a central doorway with shallow wood lattice porch.	II
Manor House, Fore Street; 50.101971°N 5.547798°W	—	18th century	Two storey house with granite ashlar walls in one moulded string course and a slate roof, swept in double pitch. Five windows have semi-circular arched heads and sashes. There is a large modern porch of wood and glass with a semi-circular fanlight.	II
Red Lion Inn, Fore Street; 50.102202°N 5.547917°W	—	18th century	Public house with granite ashlar walls, flat arches and projecting key stones. Three ground floor windows have double-hung sashes and the first floor windows have narrow side lights. The slate roof has gable ends and the central doorway is set back.	II
Workshop Premises of Mr Cattran adjoining no 12, Fradgan Place; 50.104826°N 5.550234°W	—	18th century	Rubble walls with cob on the first floor and the slate roof has gable ends. There is a central doorway with large double doors to each side. The first floor windows have sashes with glazing bars and a doorway in the centre. A rubble lean-to is on the right of front.	II
Vine Cottage, Newlyn Coombe; 50.107003°N 5.551206°W	—	18th century	Cottage with colour-washed walls, the ground floor of granite rubble and the first floor of cob. The end wall facing the road in rendered and there is a half-hipped slate roof. Three windows have sashes with glazing bars.	II
2 North Corner; 50.102863°N 5.549261°W	—	18th century	A two storey cottage with colourwashed rubble walls and a slurried slate roof with gable ends. Two windows have sashes and there is a central modern glazed door.	II
1 Trewarveneth Street; 50.102886°N 5.549044°W	—	18th century	Two storey cottage with whitened rubble walls and sluffied slate half-hipped roof. There are two windows with sashes. The front to Fore Street has three storeys with one 3-light sash per floor.	II
Cliffside and The Copper Samover; 50.102542°N 5.548355°W	—	18th century	Whitened granite and plaster, two storey house. The right-hand is part jettied with two small modern bowed shop windows and two large modern first floor square bays.	II
35 Fore Street; 50.102146°N 5.547527°W	—	18th and 19th century	Rubble and rendered cottage rising above the sea wall with two storeys above the harbour and one storey on the road. Two doorways and two windows on the road elevation and a first floor square bay window overlooking the harbour. There is a slate hipped roof.	II
Myrtle Cottage, St Peter's Hill; 50.101592°N 5.5549061°W	—	Late 18th century	Brick-faced cottage with granite plinth, string course and quoins on the front. The sides and rear are of uncoursed rubble which is partly colour-washed and partly stuccoed. The western side of the cottage is built against the ground with only the top-half of the first floor being clear. The slate roof has gable ends, with wooden eaves cornice with triglyphs, rosettes and dentils. Two bow windows cover two storeys. There is a central doorcase with fluted wooden, Doric half columns and slightly bowed entablature above the semi-arched doorway.	II
Vine Cottage, Trewarveneth Street; 50.102463°N 5.549519°W	—	Late 18th century	Two storey cottage with coursed granite walls and a slurried slate roof with gable ends. Windows have small sashes. The plain central doorway has a modern glazed door.	II
16, 17 and 18 Church Street; 50.101763°N 5.549073°W	—	Early 19th century	Three, two storey cottages with coursed granite walls and slate half-hipped roofs. Each has three windows with sashes and plain doorways with narrow rectangular fanlights (number 18 has modern casements and a modern door).	II
Rosecot, Church Street; 50.101709°N 5.549210°W	—	Early 19th century	Whitened coursed granite house of two storeys and with a slate hipped roof. Three windows have sashes with glazing bars. There is a plain central doorway with a modern door and narrow rectangular fanlight.	II
Old Bridge, Florence Place; 50.106650°N 5.549476°W	—	Early 19th century	A probable, early 19th century granite bridge with a single segmental arch, keyblock and a parapet.	II
15 and 17 The Fradgan; 50.105125°N 5.549839°W	—	Early 19th century	Granite ashlar fronted, two storey houses which have a wide string course and plinth. The slate hipped roof has wide eaves. Three windows had sashes without glazing bars. The ground floor window has keyblocks and the centre, first floor window is blocked. There are steps up to the central doorsways which have modern glazed doors. Number 15 has iron railings.	II
3 and 4 Trewarveneth Street; 50.102668°N 5.549308°W	—	No date given	Two storey granite cottages with slurried slate roof with gable ends. Windows have sashes and glazing bars and there are plain doorways. Royal Exchange firemark.	II
6 to 8 Trewarveneth Street; 50.102665°N 5.549101°W	—	Early 19th century	Two storey granite rubble cottages. Four window have sashes with glazing bars and the three plain doorways are recessed. The slate roofs have gable ends.	II
Trinity Methodist Chapel; 50.105365°N 5.550863°W	—	1834	A nonconformist chapel, enlarged in 1866 and considered to be one of the best, most complete early 19th-century chapels, containing important and rare fittings and an unaltered simple front elevation. The walls are painted rubble at the sides, coursed killas with granite dressing on the front and a Delabole slate hipped roof with projecting eaves. The front windows are over a sill string, above three round-arched doorways, the central doorway wider and inside an open distyle Doric porch with unfluted wooden columns and plain moulded entablature. There is a spoked fanlight over panelled doors. The interior is a large rectangular aisle-less plan with a horseshoe shaped gallery.	II*
Anchor Studio, Trewarveneth Street; 50.102717°N 5.550638°W	—	1888	An artists studio designed by Benjamin Arthur Bateman and built for Stanhope Forbes, the acknowledged leader of the Newlyn art colony. Built of granite rubble and timber frame, rectangular plan open to the roof with a fireplace at the west end. The entrance is on the south side and a large north light on the north side. On the eastern side the ground falls away and the boarded timber-framed range is raised on granite piers, with accommodation beneath. Anchor Studio has remained in its original use since it was built in 1888.	II
Newlyn Art Gallery; 50.107911°N 5.548723°W	—	1894	Art Gallery designed by James Hick for the Newlyn School of Art and opened in 1895. Built mainly of granite rubble with dressed quoins and lintels of granite rubble. The front is of dressed granite laid in random patterns and to the right are steps with flanking walls, which rise to a porch with half-glazed double-doors and Gothic-style surrounds to glazed upper panels set in chamfered architrave. The ground floor windows are mullioned and transomed. The roof is of gabled dry slate with brick stacks and clay ridge tiles and is crowned by a glazed facade with bargeboards to a timber 'A frame', supported by granite corbels.	II
Newlyn tidal observatory and part of the south pier 50.102991°N 5.542797°W		20th century	The 100 feet (30 m) pier extension was built in five sections and is constructed of concrete blocks on a foundation of rocks in the seabed. Built to the specifications of the Ordnance Survey. the tidal observatory is constructed of concrete with special blocks made for the copings and quoins. A shaft is built into the pier and on the harbour side is a 1 foot (0.30 m) long inlet of 9 inches (230 mm) diameter which allows water in and out of a stilling well. The well is 23 feet (7.0 m) deep and 5 feet (1.5 m) by 5 feet (1.5 m) and has a float connected to a chart-recording gauge inside the observatory.	II
Newlyn War Memorial, The Strand; 50.106292°N 5.549632°W		1920	A First World War memorial by Sir Edward Warren with a sculpted figural panel by Leonard Stanford Merrifield. Further names added after the Second World War and Korean War.	II

Tredavoe

Name and location	Photograph	Date	Notes	Grade
Tredavoe Farmhouse; 50.102540°N 5.562118°W	—	17th/18th century	Two storey farmhouse with uncoursed rubble walls and a rendered facade. Five windows have small sashes with glazing bars. There is a wood and glass gabled porch and a wood and glass gabled porch. The granite end chimney stacks are from the 19th century.	II
Chygolder Cottage; 50.103460°N 5.560497°W	—	18th century	Cottage with painted rubble walls and a rendered first floor. The slate roof is hipped at one end. There are small modern casements on the windows.	II
Ivydene; 50.103150°N 5.560834°W	—	18th century	Painted rubble, two storey cottage with gable ends and new slates on a steep roof. The central doorway has a gabled wood porch. Two windows have small slashes with glazing bars and the first floor windows are through the eaves with gabled heads.	II
Mr Paine's Farm House; 50.103616°N 5.561608°W	—	18th/19th century	A small two storied house with coursed granite walls and is a large chimney stack on an end wall. The slurried slate roof has gable ends. Three windows have sashes with glazing bars and there is a central doorway.	II
Stables and Barn at Tredavoe Farm; 50.102700°N 5.561878°W	—	18th/19th century	Two storey, L-shaped, granite rubble stables and barn with a slate roof and gable ends. The stables have a loft above, with two-light windows and first floor doorway. The north side has external steps to the loft.	II

Trereife

Name and location	Photograph	Date	Notes	Grade
Garden wall north of Trereife Manor; 50.112105°N 5.565328°W	—	Late 18th century	A red brick wall with plain stone coping, enclosing the kitchen garden.	II
