= Marjorie Frances Bruford =

English artist (1902–1958)

- Portrait of Midge Bruford, 1920 by Dod Procter
- Born: 9 April 1902; Eastbourne, England
- Died: 1958 (aged 55–56)
- Known for: Painting

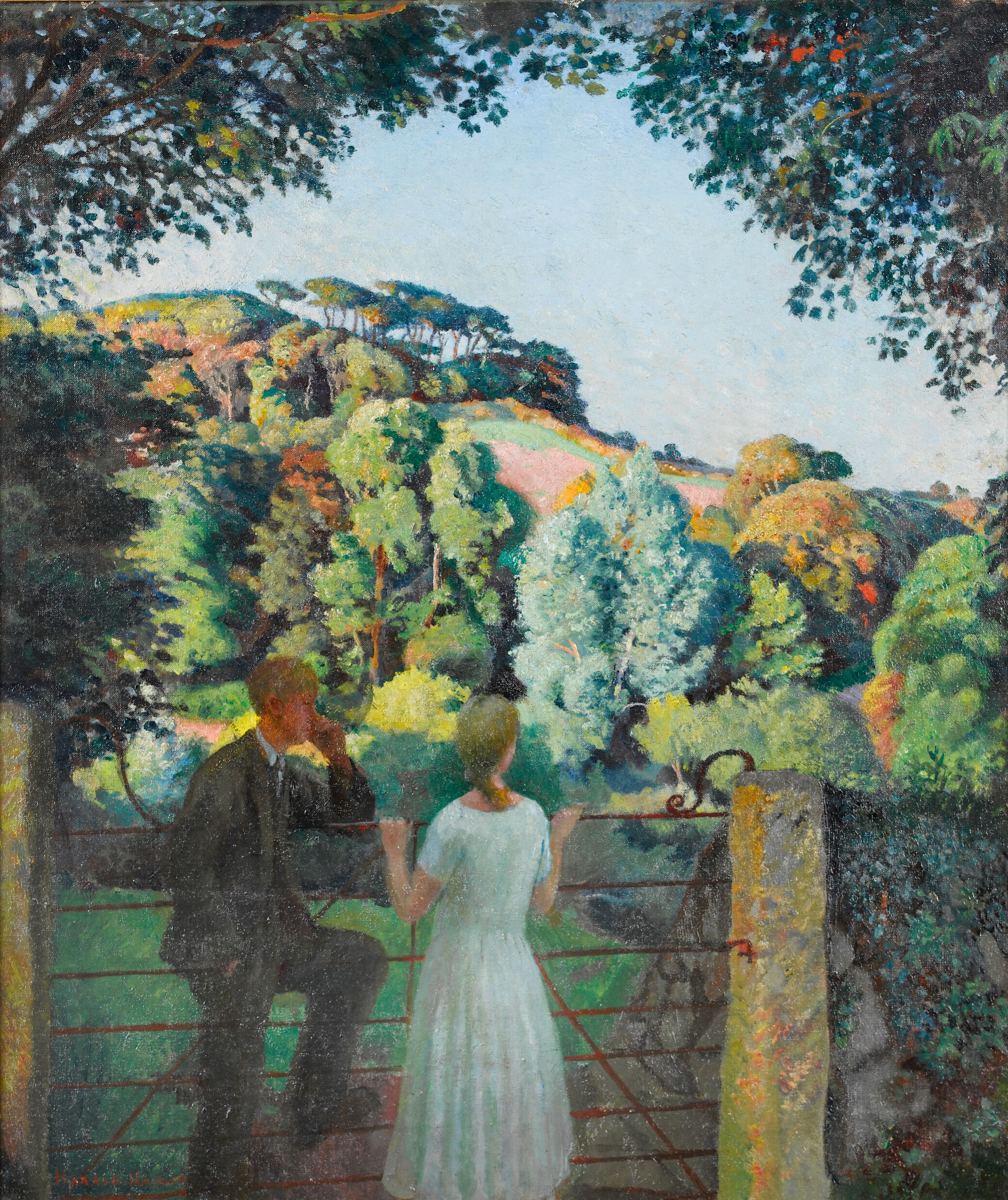
Midge Bruford and her fiancé at Chywoone Hill, Newlyn by Harold Harvey

Marjorie Frances Bruford known as Midge Bruford (9 April 1902 – 1958) was a British artist associated with the Newlyn School of artists. Although born in Eastbourne, Bruford was an active participant in several of the artist groups based in Cornwall throughout her adult life.

== Biography ==
Bruford was born in Eastbourne and attended Badminton School in the Clifton area of Bristol. There she became friends with Mornie Birch, one of the daughters of the Cornwall artist Lamorna Birch. This connection led Bruford to taking art classes at Forbes School of Painting in Newlyn during the 1920s. Later, Bruford took art lessons from other artists based in Newlyn, including Ernest Procter and Harold Harvey, and also studied under Lamorna Birch in the 1930s. For a time Bruford lived at Treveneth, near Paul, before spending time studying in Paris and later lived in a cottage between Paul and Mousehole.

Bruford mainly painted portraits and landscapes and was the subject of several portraits by Dod Proctor. Bruford and the Cornish artist Richard Weatherby (1881–1953) lived together at Mullion Cove in the late 1920s but although at one point they were engaged they never married.

During her artistic career Bruford exhibited at the Newlyn Art Gallery during the 1920s, at the Goupil Gallery in London, the Walker Art Gallery in Liverpool, with the New English Art Club and the Society of Women Artists. Bruford was a regular exhibitor at the Royal Academy, in total having some thirty-two works accepted for display there between 1924 and 1955.
