= PZ 87 The Rosebud =

Cornish fishing boat which sailed to London to campaign against slum clearance

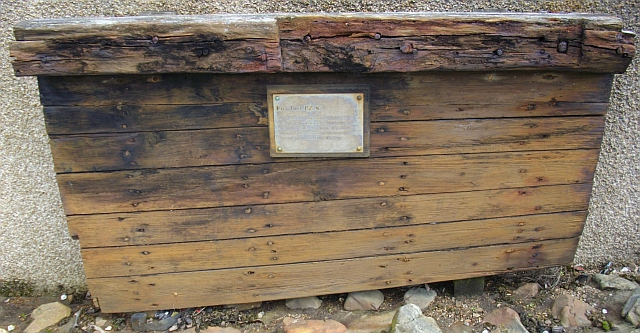
Rosebud hull.

The Rosebud - PZ 87 - was the Newlyn-based fishing boat at the centre of the attempt by Newlyn villagers to save their condemned properties in the 1930s. The Rosebud was built in Newlyn in 1919 and was a 50 feet (15 m) long coastal lugger with a mizzen and small petrol engine.

== Background ==
In 1935 the Borough of Penzance, which had the parish of Newlyn under its jurisdiction, sent the Officer of Health into the Newlyn to assess the state of housing there. This followed the policy of the Government that slums unfit for human habitation should be cleared and the residents moved to new purpose-built council estates. It was decided that a list should be drawn up of properties to be demolished and a new estate to be called Gwavas was to be built at the top of the very steep hill above Newlyn. This decision was contentious and soon split opinion in Newlyn. Many people were upset that the houses where generations of families were born and raised would vanish, and that the heart of the village would be torn out. They also protested about the site and design of the new estate; it would be isolated and hard to reach for the elderly and infirm. However, others were happy to be moved to modern homes complete with running water, sewers and electricity. When the colony of Newlyn School artists who had been settled in Newlyn since the 1880s became involved, backing the villagers who wanted to preserve their village, a local issue soon became a national one.

== Journey to London ==
In 1937 it was decided that a petition was to be delivered to the Minister of Health calling on him to make a special exception for the houses of Newlyn. For better publicity, it was planned that a Newlyn fishing boat, manned with the fishermen whose homes were threatened, would sail to London and dock at Westminster Pier. On Monday 19 October 1937 the Rosebud left Newlyn and began its journey around southern England and up the Thames, arriving to great attention from the press on Wednesday 21 October. The petition was duly delivered and the Rosebud and its crew stayed in London until the next week and sailed back to Newlyn and resumed their working lives.

== Result ==
The government decided to reprieve some properties and the voyage was deemed a huge success, but when the jubilation faded it was discovered that not a great deal had been achieved. Houses were still bought and demolished, although under more scrutiny than before owing to the press interest, and the residents continued to be moved into the Gwavas estate. The core of the village was saved by the Second World War, which began in 1939. The houses that had been emptied of people and were awaiting demolition were pressed into use as emergency accommodation for displaced French and Belgian fishermen and their families, escaping the German advance. These houses were modernised and thus survived up until this day.

The Rosebud changed owners and names over the years and ended up rotting on Lelant Saltings before being broken up and removed by people keen to have a little bit of history in their homes.

Today the voyage of the Rosebud is commemorated by a plaque at the Fisherman's Mission, erected in 1987, and by public memorial garden above the car park which had formerly been the busy St Peters Square.
