= Ordnance datum =

Vertical datum used as the basis for deriving altitudes on maps

Vertical references in Europe

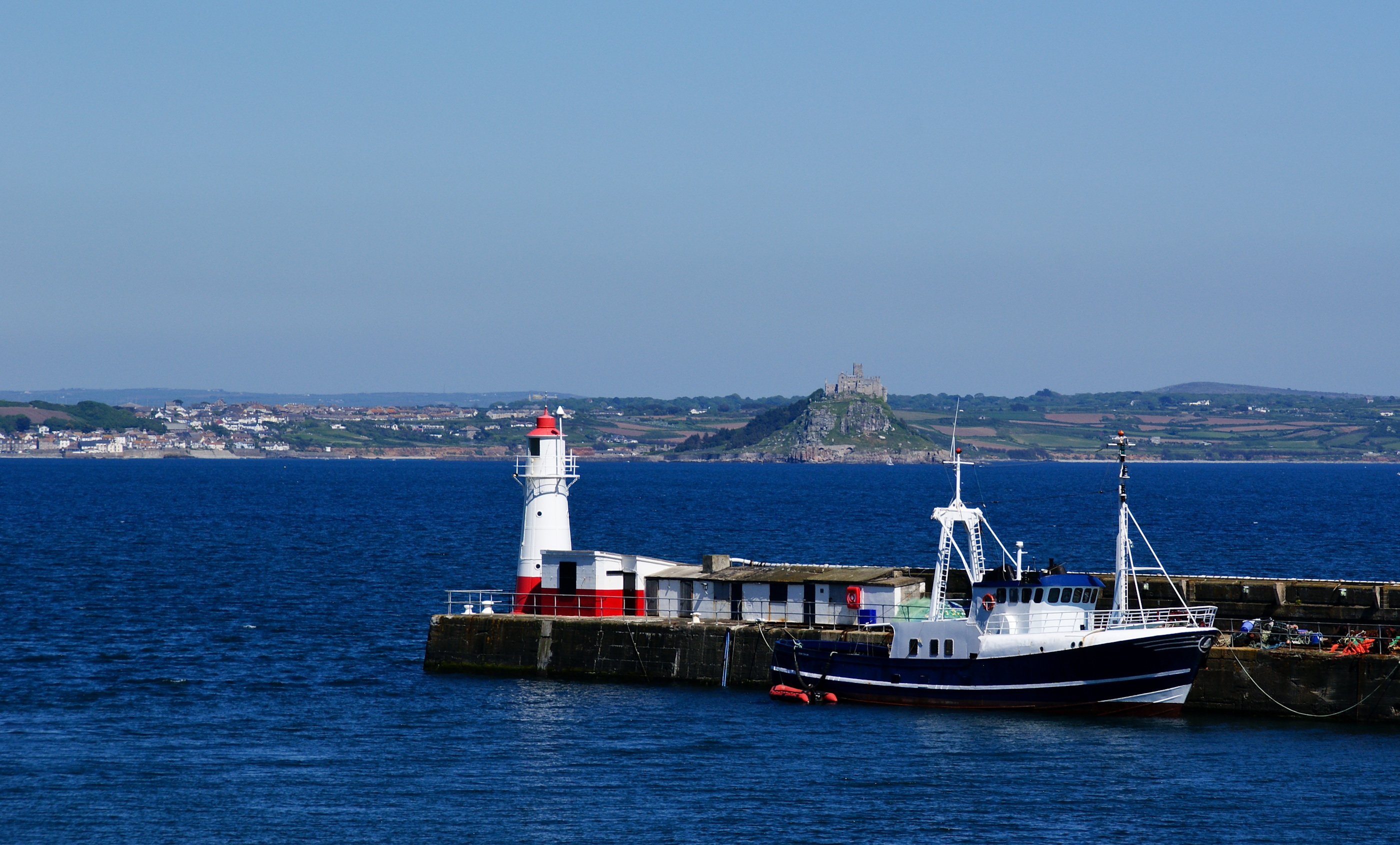
View from Newlyn harbour showing the lighthouse and Newlyn Tidal Observatory to its right, both painted red and white.

An ordnance datum (OD) is a vertical datum used by an Ordnance Survey as the basis for deriving altitudes on maps. A spot height may be expressed as above ordnance datum (AOD). Usually mean sea level (MSL) at a particular place is used for the datum.

== British Isles ==
- In Great Britain, OD for the Ordnance Survey is Ordnance Datum Newlyn (ODN), defined as the mean sea level (MSL) as recorded by the Newlyn Tidal Observatory between 1915 and 1921.
  - Prior to 1921, OD was Ordnance Datum Liverpool (ODL) defined as MSL as recorded in the Victoria Dock, Liverpool, during a short period in 1844. The first datum – established in 1840 – used a benchmark on St. John’s Church in central Liverpool.
- In Northern Ireland, OD for the Ordnance Survey of Northern Ireland is Belfast Ordnance Datum: the MSL at Clarendon Dock, Belfast Harbour, between 1951 and 1956.
- In Ireland, OD for the Ordnance Survey of Ireland is Malin Ordnance Datum: the MSL at Portmoor Pier, Malin Head, County Donegal, between 1960 and 1969.
  - Prior to 1970, Poolbeg Ordnance Datum was used: the low water of spring tide at Poolbeg Lighthouse, Dublin, on 8 April 1837. Poolbeg OD was about 2.7 metres (9 feet) lower than Malin OD.

=== Ordnance Datum Newlyn and its antecedents ===
The First Geodetic Levelling of England and Wales (1840–1860) needed to define a datum plane from which to specify spot heights. At first it was specified as a horizontal plane 100 feet below an arbitrary benchmark on St John's Church, Liverpool. Subsequently, however, it was redefined as mean sea level (MSL). To establish MSL, tidal observations were taken at the Victoria Dock, Liverpool, over a short period in 1844.

By the time of the Second Geodetic Levelling (1912–1921) the importance of stability was better appreciated and so it was decided to use Fundamental Bench Marks (FBMs) installed in solid rock, rather than on buildings as before. To measure average MSL around Great Britain three tide gauges were employed; once each at Dunbar, Newlyn, and Felixstowe. However, it was found that the measured difference between the Dunbar and Newlyn stations was 0.81 feet (0.247m), far larger than could be accounted for by error. The difference was real. Accordingly, it was decided not to use average MSL and fix on one site: MSL Newlyn. Newlyn has certain practical advantages: it is set in granite bedrock, is far from major rivers, and it better represents deep ocean sea levels.

The difference between ODL (Liverpool) and ODN (Newlyn) was found to be 0.13 feet. It took some time for the changed definition — Liverpool to Newlyn — to work through the system: by 1950, some 40% of the lower secondary and tertiary levellings were still using the Liverpool datum. But following the Third Geodetic Levelling, Ordnance Survey maps published since March 1956 give spot heights above the Newlyn datum.

Newlyn Tidal Observatory was given grade II listing on 11 December 2018.

=== Tunnel datum ===
A tunnel datum is a datum based on an ordnance datum and used in designing tunnels which pass below sea level.

- for the London Underground, a tunnel datum of ODN −100 m is used; thus a depth of −60 m AOD is 40 m ATD (above tunnel datum)
- for the Channel Tunnel, a tunnel datum of ODN −200 m is used; thus a depth of −60 m is 140 m ATD

== See also ==
- Ordnance Survey National Grid – System of geographic grid references used in Great Britain
- Principal Triangulation of Great Britain – 1791–1853 geodetic survey of Britain
- Chart datum – Level of water from which depths displayed on a nautical chart are measured
- Trinity High Water
- Vertical Offshore Reference Frames – UK and Irish hydrographic vertical datum
