= Ernest Procter =

English artist (1885–1935)

- Born: 22 March 1885; Tynemouth, Northumberland, England
- Died: 21 October 1935 (aged 50); North Shields, County Durham, England
- Education: Forbes' School of Painting, Atelier Colarossi
- Known for: Painter, illustrator
- Movement: Newlyn School
- Spouse: Dod Procter

Ernest Procter ARA (22 March 1885–21 October 1935) was an English designer, illustrator and painter, and husband of British artist Dod Procter. He was actively involved with the Newlyn School, partner of the Harvey-Procter School and an instructor at the Glasgow School of Art.

== Personal life and education ==
Ernest Procter was born into a Quaker family in Tynemouth, Northumberland. His father Henry Richardson Procter was an eminent scientist and a Leeds University professor who specialised in leather chemistry. He was also a Fellow of the Royal Society. Edward painted his father's portrait.

Procter, like his father, attended school first in York at the Quaker Bootham School. From 1907 to 1910 he was a student of Stanhope Forbes at the Forbes' School of Painting in Newlyn, Cornwall. He contributed to the school's publication, The Paper Chase in 1908 and 1909, was an assistant to Stanhope and Elizabeth Forbes, and was a successful, well-respected student. At Forbes' Procter met his future wife Doris "Dod" Shaw; They were "amongst the Forbes' star pupils."

In 1910 and 1911 Procter studied in Paris at Atelier Colarossi. Dod Shaw was also a student at Atelier Colarossi. Ernest and Dod were both influenced by Impressionism and Post-Impressionism and the artists that they met in France, such as Pierre-Auguste Renoir and Paul Cézanne. In 1912 Procter married Dod at the church of Saint-Vincent-de-Paul, Paris. They had a son together named Bill and stayed in Paris until 1918.

In 1918 Procter and his wife returned to Newlyn, where they primarily lived from that point onward. On 21 October 1935, after years of high blood pressure, Procter died of a cerebral haemorrhage in North Shields, County Durham, while travelling.

== First World War ==
During the First World War Procter was a conscientious objector, serving with the Friends' Ambulance Unit in Dunkirk from April 1916 until February 1919.

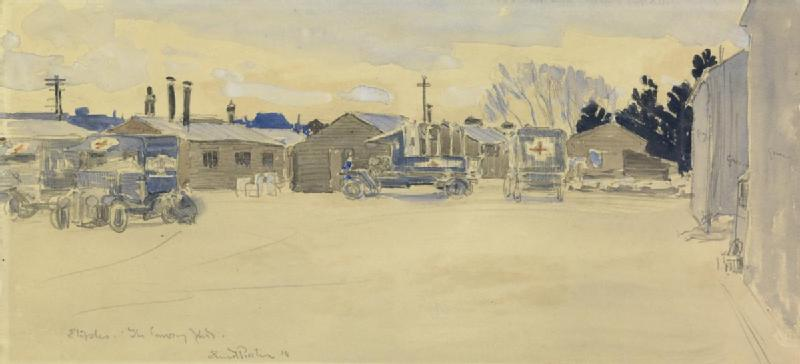
Étaples, The Convoy Yard, Imperial War Museum

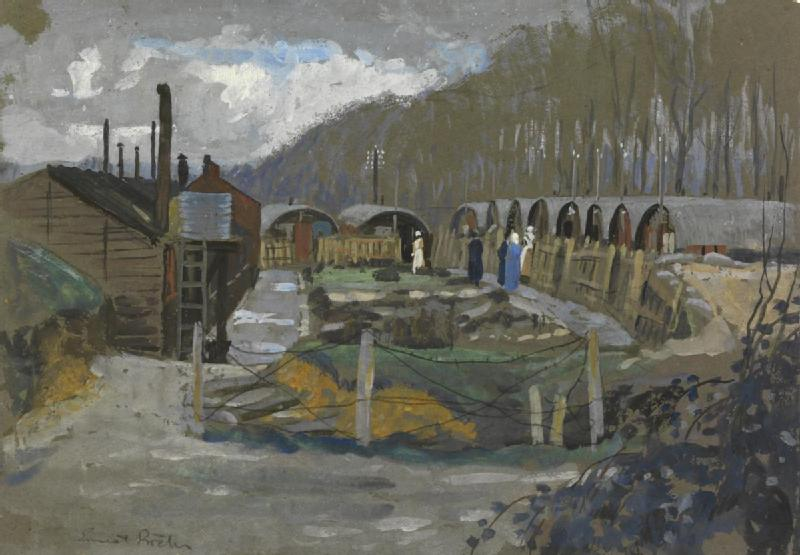
Nissen huts, St Omer, Imperial War Museum

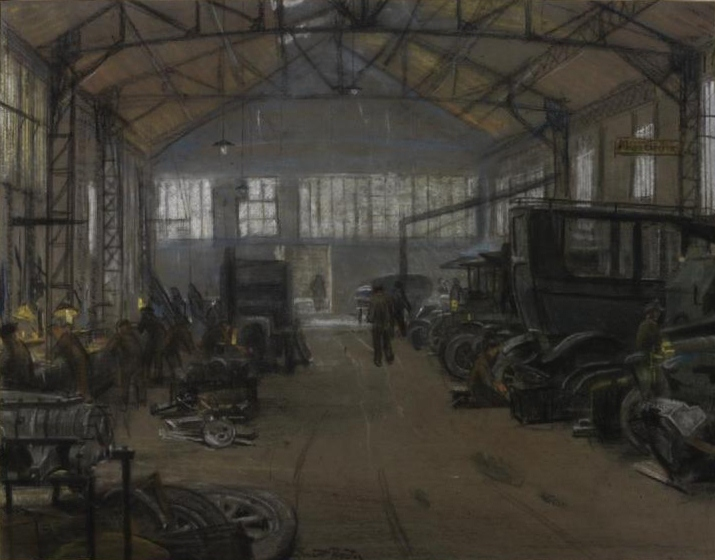
The Interior of a Garage, Boulogne, Imperial War Museum

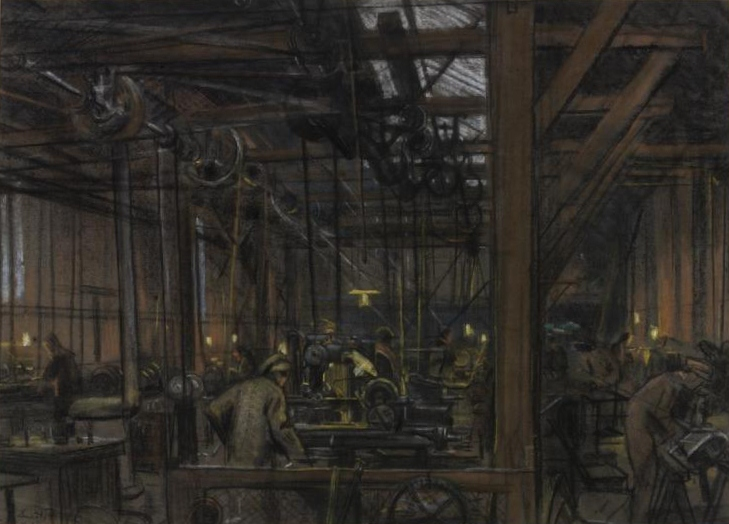
The Interior of the BRCS and Order of St John Garage, Boulogne, Imperial War Museum

== Career ==
After the war Dod and Ernest Procter returned to Newlyn, where Ernest was a member of the Newlyn Society of Artists. In 1920 Ernest and Harold Harvey established the Harvey-Procter School. They taught painting of still life, figures and landscapes in watercolour and oil. He and his wife, accepted a commission to decorate the Kokine Palace, Rangoon, in 1919 and 1920.

Procter created in 1931 what he called Diaphenicons, which were "painted and glazed decorations that provided their own light source." Leicester Galleries exhibited these works.

The Glasgow School of Art appointed him Director of Studies in Design and Craft in 1934.

== Works ==
Procter's works included portraits and landscapes.

=== Paintings ===
- All the Fun of the Fair
- Aphrodite
- Delphiniums, 1907** Earth, Water, Fire, Air, 1928
- Feather leaves, 1934, a painted ceramic plate, Penlee House Gallery and Museum. (Note: Produced in Bizarre by Clarice Cliff. Made for October 1934 Harrod's Exhibition.)
- Helston Flora Dance, 1926
- Mother & Child, 1924
- Malo Gate, Dunkirk, 1924
- Night and Evening
- Porthgwarra, oil on canvas, Penlee House Gallery and Museum.
- Rising Tide, 1936, Penlee House Gallery and Museum.
- Spring Hawthorn
- The Edge of the Shadow, 1921, for a Royal Academy Exhibition
- The Four Elements
- The Mischievous Boy
- The Road to Sancreed
- The Terrace, 1921
- The Zodiac, 1925, oil on canvas, Tate
- Those Who Dare
- Versailles, 1921

=== Portraits ===
- Sir Thomas Beecham, 2nd Bt
- Sir Thomas Beecham Conducting A Mass of Life at the Queen's Hall, 1929
- Frederick Delius
- Group including Frederick Delius and Philip Arnold Heseltine
- Sir Landon Ronald

=== Church or other commissions ===
- St Mary's Church altar screen, Chapel Street, Penzance – which in 1985 was destroyed during a fire
- Kokine Palace decorations, Rangoon, 1920 with his wife Dod. (Note: The eastern aesthetic influenced his subsequent works.)
- St Hilary Church, Cornwall:
  - Depicted St Mawes, St Kevin and St Neot for the St Hilary Church pulpit
  - Reredos of the Altar of the Dead for the St Hilary Church
  - Visitation, 1933, St Hilary Church
  - Deposition, 1935, St Hilary Church
  - Dod also made works for the St Hilary Church. Ernest and Dod's works are still on view at the church.

=== World War I ===
- Étaples, The Convoy Yard, 1918, pencil and watercolour, Imperial War Museum, Gift of the British Red Cross Society and Order of St John of Jerusalem, 1920
- Nissen Huts, St Omer, chalk and gouache, Imperial War Museum, Gift of the British Red Cross Society and Order of St John of Jerusalem, 1920
- The Interior of a Garage, Boulogne, pastel drawing, Imperial War Museum, Gift of the British Red Cross Society and Order of St John of Jerusalem, 1920
- The Interior of the BRCS and Order of St John Garage, Boulogne, pastel drawing, Imperial War Museum, Gift of the British Red Cross Society and Order of St John of Jerusalem, 1920

=== Book illustrations and other works ===
- Crowns Mine, Botallack, pencil drawing. Penlee House Gallery and Museum.
- In Newlyn (untitled). Penlee House Gallery and Museum.
- No Breakfast for Growler, 1901, book illustrations. Penlee House Gallery and Museum.
- Young Witches at Play in the Night Sky, pastel drawing. Penlee House Gallery and Museum.

== Museums and galleries ==
His works are part of collections at the Imperial War Museum, Tate, Leeds, Newcastle, Penlee House Gallery and Museum, and Worthing / Adelaide.

== Memberships ==
He was a member or affiliated to the following organisations:

- Associate of the Royal Academy (ARA), from 1932
- International Society of Sculptors, Painters and Engravers (IS), from 1925
- New English Art Club (NEAC), from 1929
- Newlyn Art Gallery (NAG), also called the Passmore Edwards Art Gallery, Newlyn, Cornwall
- Newlyn Society of Artists (NSA), Newlyn, Cornwall – member from 1924 to 34, trustee 1928 to 34

== Exhibitions ==
Procter's work was exhibited:

- 1904 +: Newlyn Art Gallery (NAG) – starting 1904, first sale 1909
- 1913: Fine Art Gallery
- 1916 +: International Society
- Leicester Galleries
- Royal Academy (49)
- Leicester Galleries (99)

Memorial exhibitions in 1936:

- Leicester Galleries
- Laing Art Gallery, Newcastle

Posthumous:

- 1985: Painting in Newlyn 1900-1930, Newlyn Art Gallery (NAG) & Barbican Art Gallery
- 1987: Looking West, Paintings inspired by Cornwall
- 1989: A Century of Art in Cornwall, CCC centenary, Truro
- 1990: Dod Procter RA and Ernest Procter ARA, Laing Art Gallery, Newcastle
- 1992: Royal West of England Academy, Bristol: Artists from Cornwall

== Gallery ==
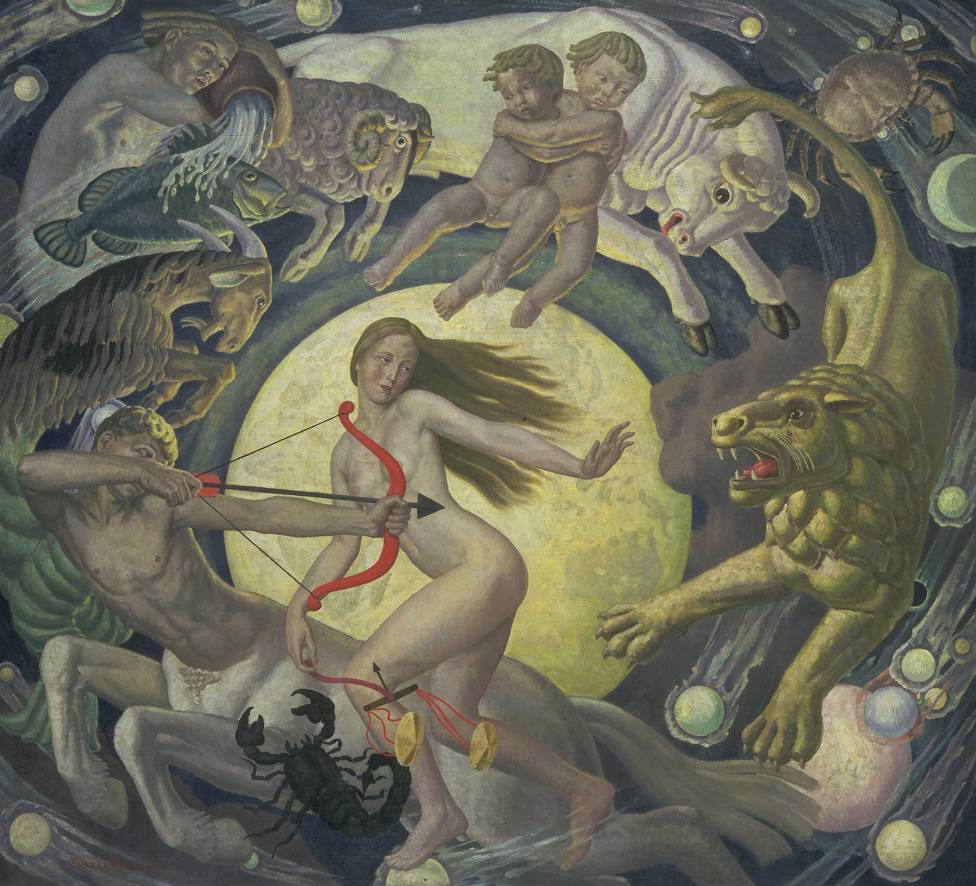
Ernest Procter, The Zodiac, 1925, oil paint on canvas, Tate Museum

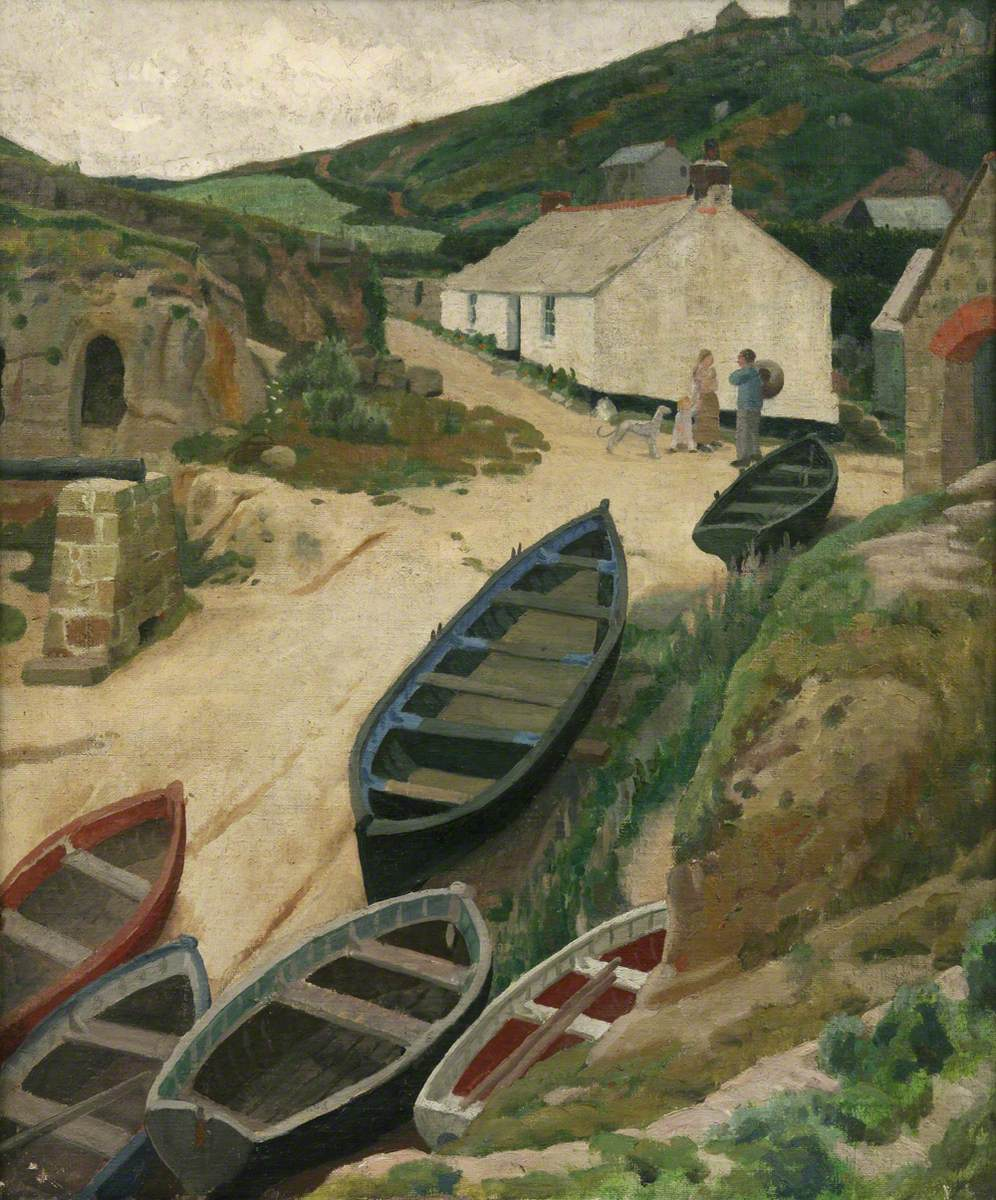
Ernest Procter, Porthgwarra, oil on canvas, Penlee House
