= Richard Cook (painter born 1947) =

British painter

- Born: 1947 (age 78–79); Cheltenham, Gloucestershire
- Education: Saint Martin's School of Art, Royal College of Art
- Known for: Painting

Richard Vernon Francis Cook (born 1947, Cheltenham, England) is a British painter living and working in Newlyn, Cornwall. Cook has been exhibiting for over twenty five years and has received awards from the British Council and the Arts Council. In 2001 he was given a solo show at Tate St Ives, with a related publication, and a major painting was acquired for the collection in 2006. Further works are held in the British Museum collection.

== Early life and education ==
Cook spent his early childhood in Ceylon, upon his family’s return to England, he attended school in Oxfordshire. Cook went on to study at Saint Martin's School of Art, London (1966–70), and the Royal College of Art, London (1970–73). As a child Cook was passionate about nature and learnt the names of trees, birds, fish and flowers. He spent countless hours near the river and woods in Oxford where he lived, feeling rooted through his experiences of nature. These are the things he loved as a child and is rediscovering as an artist living in Cornwall.

== Collections ==
- Tate Gallery, London
- The Arts Council of Great Britain
- The British Museum, London
- Manchester City Art Gallery
- Deutsche Bank, London

== Selected exhibitions ==
=== Solo ===
- 2001: Luminous, Tate St Ives, Cornwall
- 2003: New Paintings, Austin/Desmond Fine Art, London
- 2006: Art First, London
- 2008: Iridescence, Art First, London
- 2010: Under the Summer, The Exchange, Penzance, Cornwall
- 2012: With Closed Eyes, Keslte Barton, Manaccan, Cornwall
- 2016: She lies within my sleep, Felix & Spear, London

=== Group ===
- 1976: The Human Clay, Hayward Gallery, London
- 2005: Mixed Doubles, Art First, London
- 2006: Drawing Inspiration: Contemporary British Drawing, Abbot Hall, Kendal
- 2007: Art Now, Tate St. Ives
- 2010: Meetings Of Dreams, The Wills Lane Gallery, St. Ives
- 2012: Landscape, The Redfern Gallery, London
