= Gwavas =

Area of Newlyn, in Cornwall

Coordinates: 50.102°N 5.552°W

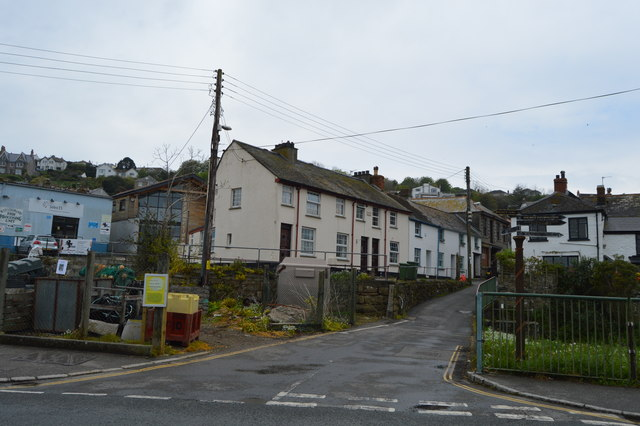
Gwavas Quay

Gwavas is a residential council estate on the southern outskirts of the town of Newlyn in west Cornwall, England, United Kingdom. It is situated immediately west of Gwavas Road and takes its name from nearby Gwavas Farm.

== History and geography ==
The name Gwavas derives from the Cornish "gwaf" meaning winter, and "bos" meaning abode. Its derivation is from the Cornish "gwavos" meaning "winter farm". There are also places of the same name in the parishes of Grade-Ruan and Sithney.

The slum clearance programme was intended to be much larger but many houses were saved following the famous Rosebud Campaign.

Gwavas is situated on hilly ground.

== Gwavas Lake ==
Nearby is the Gwavas Lake, which is an area of relatively calm water situated outside the current harbour area of Newlyn.
