= Newlyn =

Town in Cornwall, England

Coordinates: 50.101°N 5.553°W

Newlyn: Cornish: Lulynn
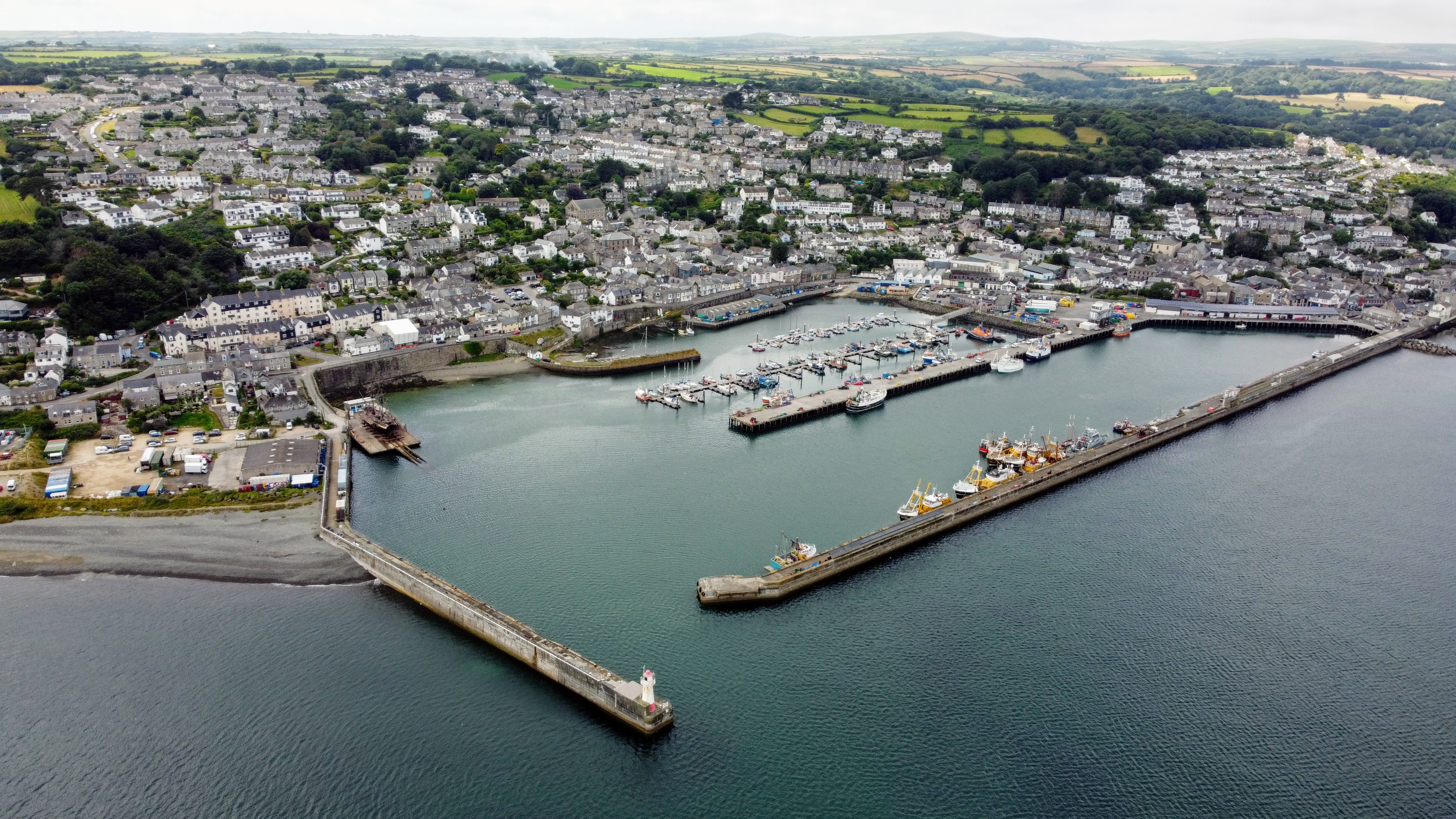

- Location within Cornwall
- OS grid reference: SW460283
- Civil parish: Penzance
- Unitary authority: Cornwall
- Ceremonial county: Cornwall
- Region: South West
- Country: England
- Sovereign state: United Kingdom
- Post town: Penzance
- Postcode district: TR18
- Dialling code: 01736
- Police: Devon and Cornwall
- Fire: Cornwall
- Ambulance: South Western
- UK Parliament: St Ives

Newlyn (Cornish: Lulynn [lylɪnː], meaning fleet pool) is a seaside town and fishing port in south-west Cornwall, England, United Kingdom. It is the largest fishing port by tonnage in England.

Newlyn lies on the shore of Mount's Bay and forms a small conurbation with the neighbouring town of Penzance. It is part of the Penzance civil parish. The principal industry is fishing, although there are also a variety of yachts and pleasure boats in the harbour, as Newlyn has become a popular holiday destination with pubs and restaurants. Although the parish is now listed under Penzance, there is an electoral ward in separate existence called Mousehole, Newlyn and St Buryan.

== Toponymy ==
The settlement is recorded as Nulyn in 1279 and as Lulyn in 1290, and the name is thought to be derived from the Cornish for "pool for a fleet of boats" which is thought to refer to the shallows offshore known as Gwavas Lake, traditionally the principal mooring for the fishing fleet in the area.

== History ==
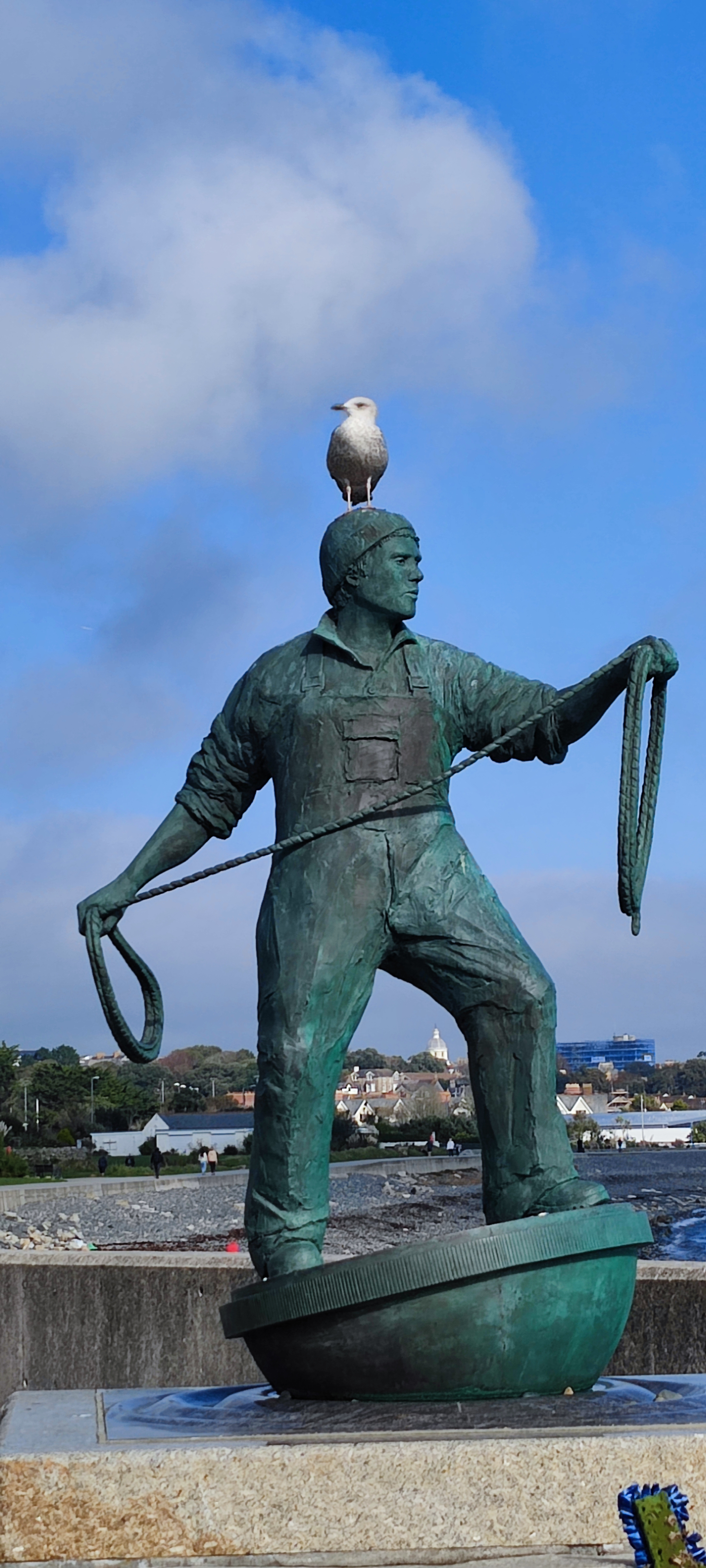
Newlyn Fisherman Memorial in Newlyn, Cornwall – bronze statue by Tom Leaper commemorating fishermen lost at sea

Before the rise of Newlyn as an important settlement the landing rights and most properties within the Newlyn area were owned by the Manor of Alverton. Newlyn's history has been strongly linked to its role as a major fishing port. The natural protection afforded by the Gwavas Lake (an area of seawater in Mount's Bay) led to many local fishermen using this area as a preferred landing site.

The Spanish Raid of 1595 destroyed Penzance, Mousehole and Paul as well as Newlyn.

In 1620 the Mayflower stopped off at Newlyn old quay to take on water. A plaque on the quay reads:

NEWLYN AMERICA

In grateful recognition of the research of Bill Best Harris world leading expert and custodian of Plymouth's historic archives, who discovered that the

MAYFLOWER

docked here for fresh water and cargo adjustments, making Newlyn Old Quay the very last stop and final departure point before it set sall for America.

In honour of Cornwall, the county they set sall from, It is a fact that they named their first arrival point In America, TRURO.

Also, thanks to John S Chapman of Lelant for additional supporting research.

MAYFLOWER

NEWLYN 400 CELEBRATIONS

In 1755, the Lisbon earthquake caused a tsunami to strike the Cornish coast more than 600 miles (970 km) away from the epicentre. The sea rose ten feet (3 m) in ten minutes at Newlyn, and ebbed at the same rate. The 19th-century French writer, Arnold Boscowitz, claimed that "great loss of life and property occurred upon the coasts of Cornwall".

Before the 19th century, "Newlyn" referred only to the area near the old quay. The part of the village that now contains the fish market was known as "Streetanowan", this was separated at high tide from "Newlyn Town" the site of the lower part of the modern harbour being reclaimed land and formerly a beach. In fact Newlyn comprises three discrete hamlets all previously separated by bodies of water, being Tolcarne (Tal Carn: Brow of the Rocks), Street-an-owan (Street-an-Owan: Oxen Street) and Trewarveneth (Farm/Manor on the Hill).

Newlyn (like Mousehole) was part of the ancient parish of Paul. It was common for villagers to climb the relatively steep route from "Newlyn Cliff" to Paul via the area which is now known as Gwavas to worship at Paul Church. Until the mid-20th century an ancient stone cross was present on this route at "Park an Grouse" (The Field of the Cross), this cross was one site of veneration of the Cornish sea deity Bucca, (others were the beaches of Newlyn and Mousehole) the name 'Bucca' has often been used as a nickname for people who reside in Newlyn: the location of the cross is now unknown.

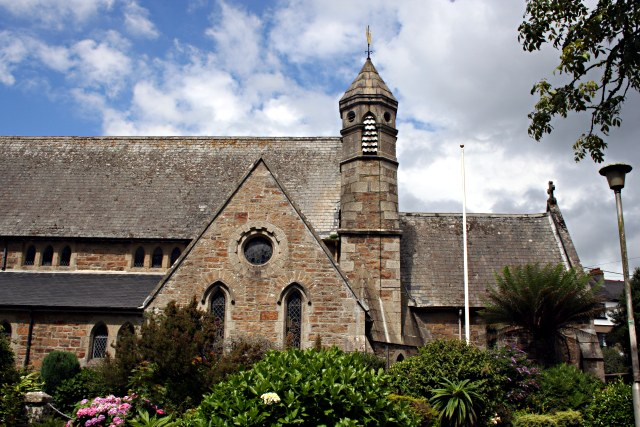
St Peter's Church

In 1851 Newlyn became the separate ecclesiastical parish of Newlyn St Peter. The church of St Peter was built in the Early English style in 1859–66. The interior is embellished with various works of art including the altarpiece and a statue of the Madonna and Child (by the then vicar the Rev. Allan G. Wyon). "The ensemble is an outstanding example of Anglo-Catholic embellishment of the period [1936–55]" (Peter Beacham). Father Wyon was the vicar from 1936 until his retirement in 1955. There is a Cornish cross by the road near the churchyard; it was found at Trereife about 1870 and much later placed near the church by the Rev. W. S. Lach-Szyrma.

Gala Day at Newlyn by Stanhope Forbes, 1907

In the 1880s a number of artists moved to the town and formed an artists' colony. The painters of Newlyn came to be known as the Newlyn School.

In 1896 Newlyn was the scene of the Newlyn riots following protests over the landing of fish on a Sunday by fishermen from the north of England, the local Cornish fishermen being members of the Methodist church and as such strong supporters of sabbatarianism.

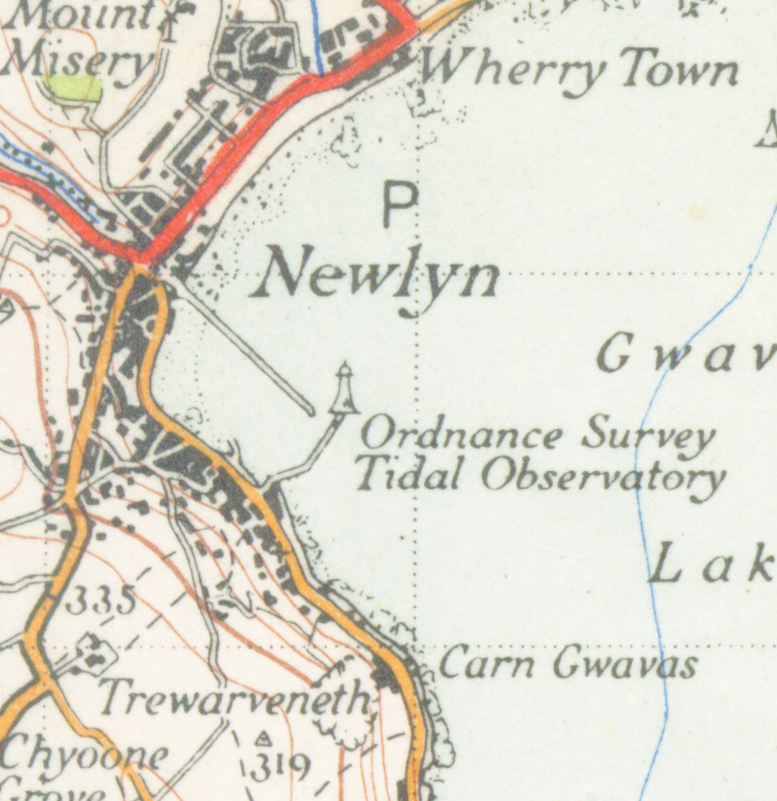
A map of the town from 1946 showing the tidal observatory

From 1915, the Ordnance Survey tidal observatory was established in the harbour and for the next six years measurements of tidal height were taken every 15 minutes. This tidal gauge data was used to calculate the mean sea level at Newlyn, Ordnance Datum Newlyn, which became the vertical datum the Ordnance Survey uses to map altitudes throughout Great Britain.

In 1937, the fishing vessel Rosebud sailed to London to deliver a petition to the Minister of Health on behalf of those villagers whose homes were threatened under the government's slum clearance scheme.

During the Second World War Newlyn was a base for the air sea rescue craft covering the Western Approaches. The harbour was bombed during the war, hitting the collier Greenhithe, which was beached in the harbour at the time and supplied coal to the east coast drifters, which travelled to Newlyn during the mackerel fishing season between the wars. Reporting the event on the Germany Calling propaganda broadcast Lord Haw-Haw announced that the Luftwaffe had sunk a British cruiser in Newlyn Harbour.

The 2014 LP Cornish Pop Songs by indie band the Hit Parade contains several songs referencing Newlyn fishing industry including "The Ghost of the Fishing Fleet", a comment on the declining investment in the area, neglect by central government and the recent influx in tourist trade.

=== Newlyn and the Cornish language ===
Newlyn, along with nearby Mousehole and Paul, was the last stronghold of the Cornish language, presumably due to the strength of its fishing fleet. William Gwavas, James Jenkins, Nicholas Boson, Thomas Boson, John Boson, John Keigwin, and John Kelynack Jnr had roots in or strong links with the district. Subsequently, several antiquarians including Prince Louis Lucien Bonaparte, Daines Barrington, Georg Sauerwein and Henry Jenner who all collected Cornish writings or sayings, and the latter two became proficient in its use.

=== Local government ===
In 1894 Newlyn became part of Paul Urban District, while Tolcarne on the eastern side of the stream was in Madron Urban District. The urban districts were abolished in 1934 and Newlyn and Tolcarne were absorbed into the municipal borough of Penzance. Penzance Municipal Borough was itself abolished in 1974 under the Local Government Act 1972, and Newlyn became part of the new Penwith district. The former borough was unparished until 1980. The unparished area was formed into a civil parish in 1980, and the new Penzance parish council chose to call itself a town council. Newlyn returns five councillors to Penzance Town Council. Penwith District was abolished in 2009, and Newlyn now falls under the unitary Cornwall Council, with the town being shared between two divisions, Penzance Promenade in the east and Newlyn and Mousehole in the west. Since 2021, the town has been part of the new Mousehole, Newlyn and St Buryan division.

== Geography ==
Newlyn is located in western Cornwall, just south of Penzance. It lies along the B3315 road which connects it to Land's End. Paul and Mousehole lie to the south. Newlyn is the second most southerly town on the UK mainland, after Helston.

The Ordnance Survey, the United Kingdom's mapping agency, bases all elevations including mapped contour lines and spot heights on the mean sea level at Newlyn (see Ordnance Datum). The mean sea level data was calculated from hourly readings of the sea level between 1 May 1915 and 30 April 1921.

== Economy ==
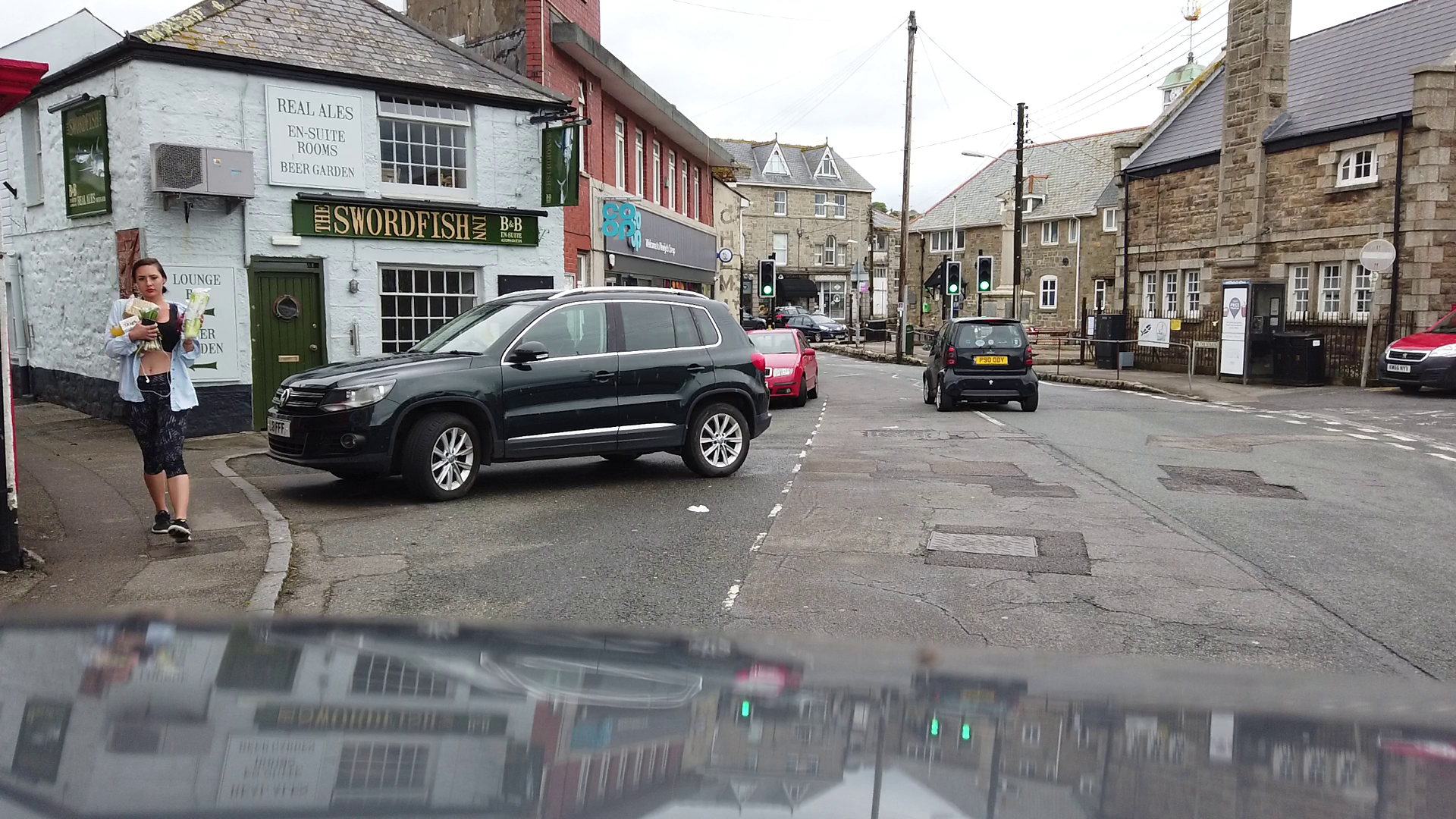
The Swordfish pub

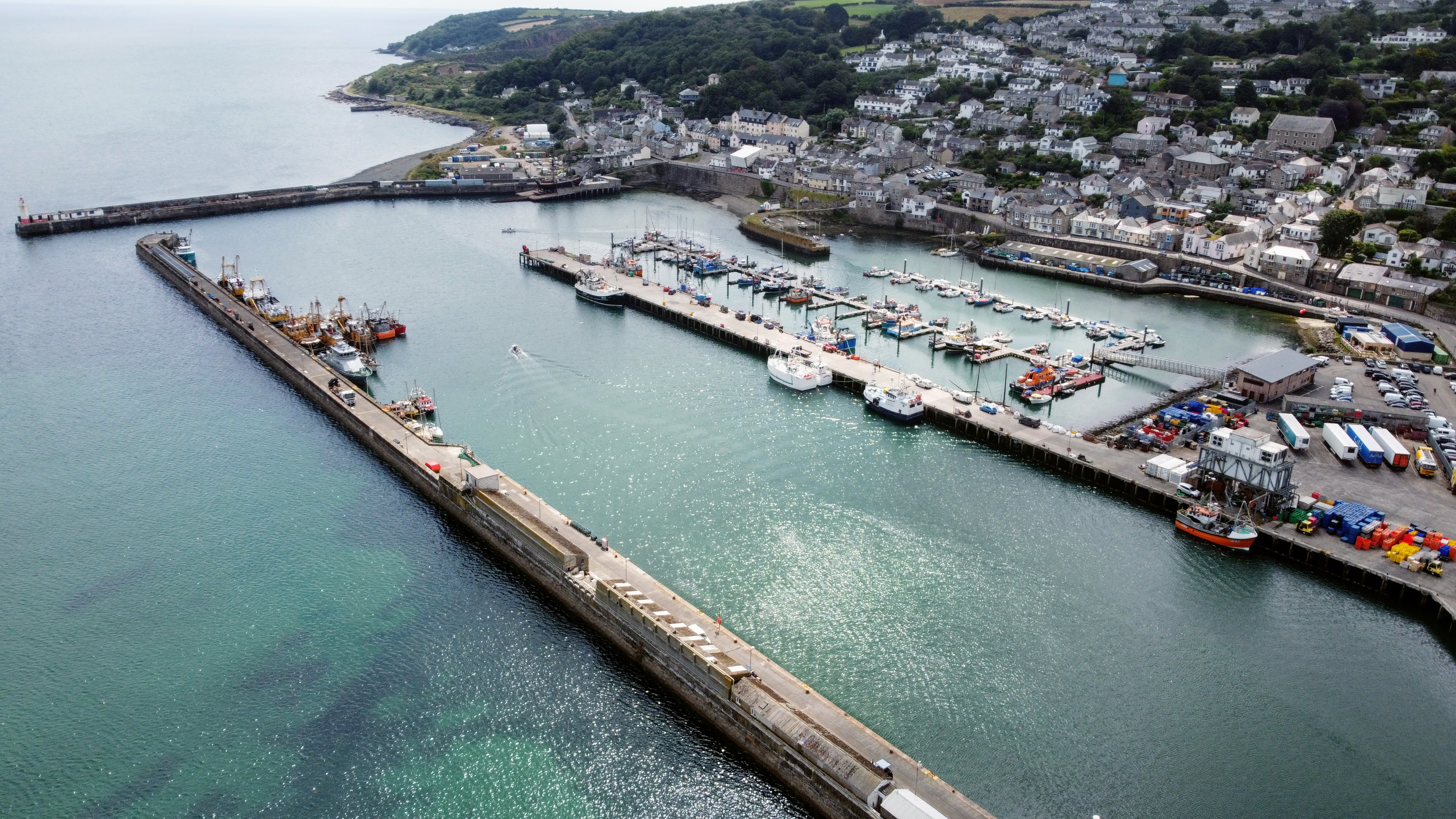
Newlyn Harbour

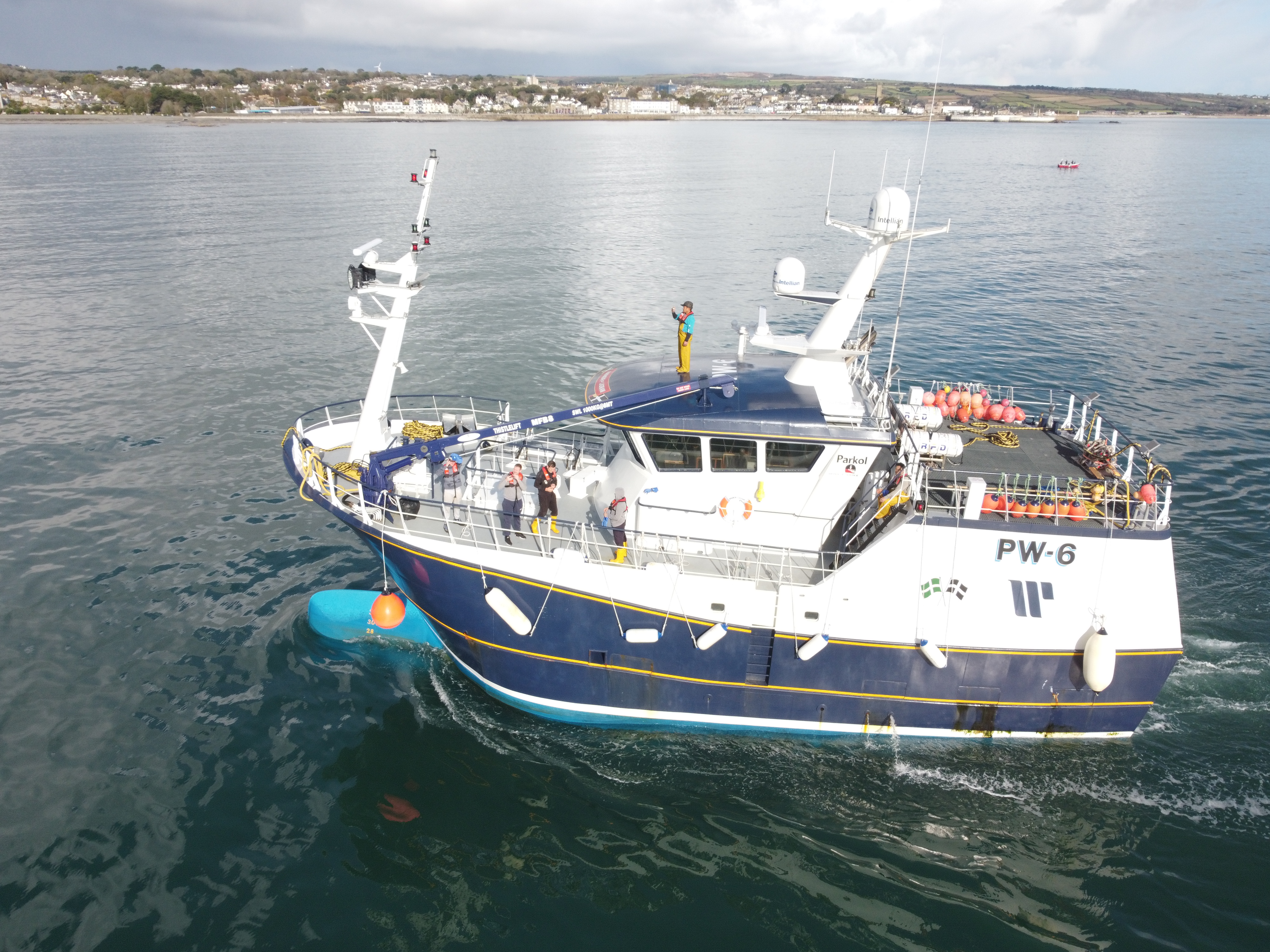
A fishing boat coming into Newlyn

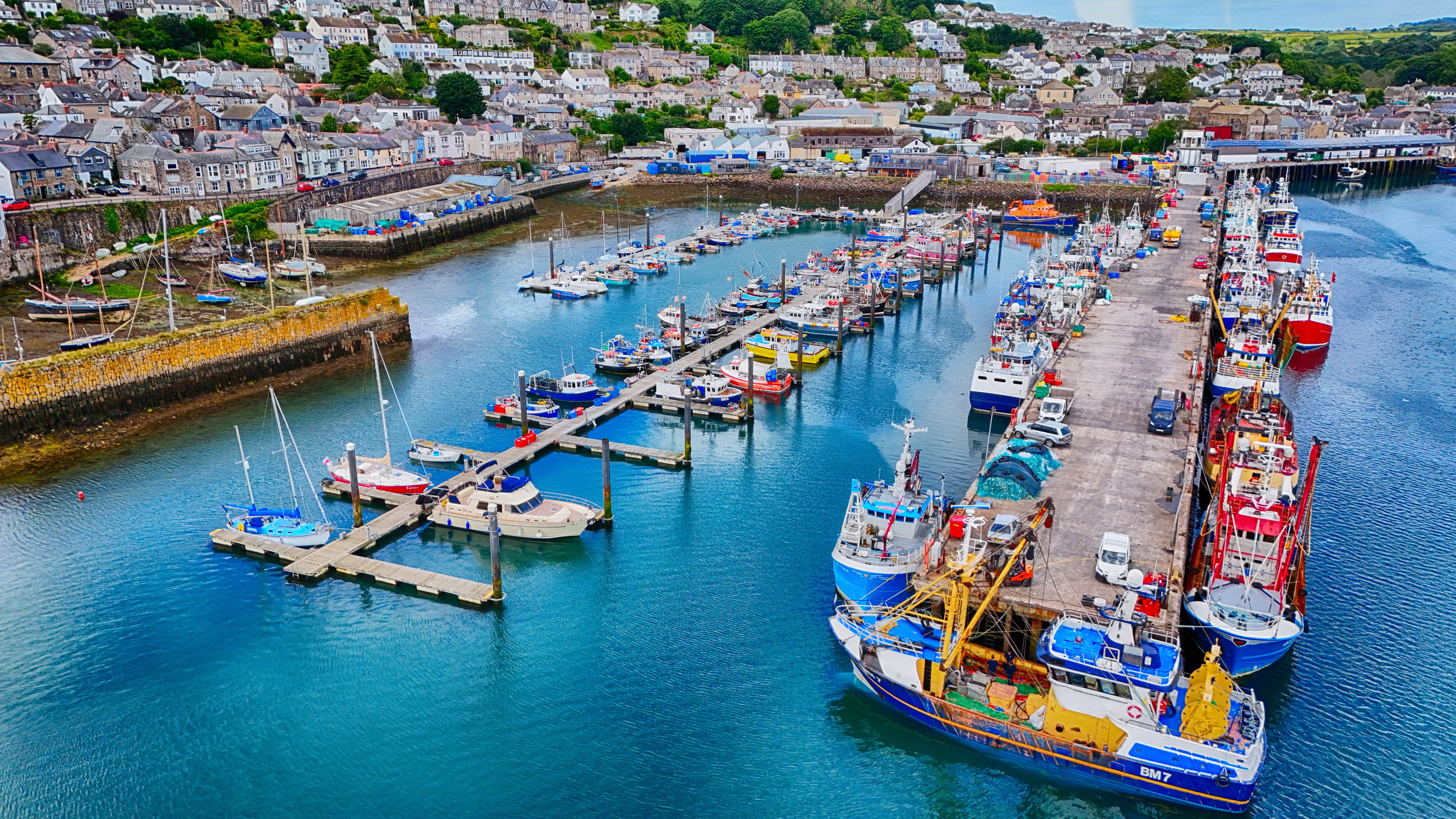
fishing boats

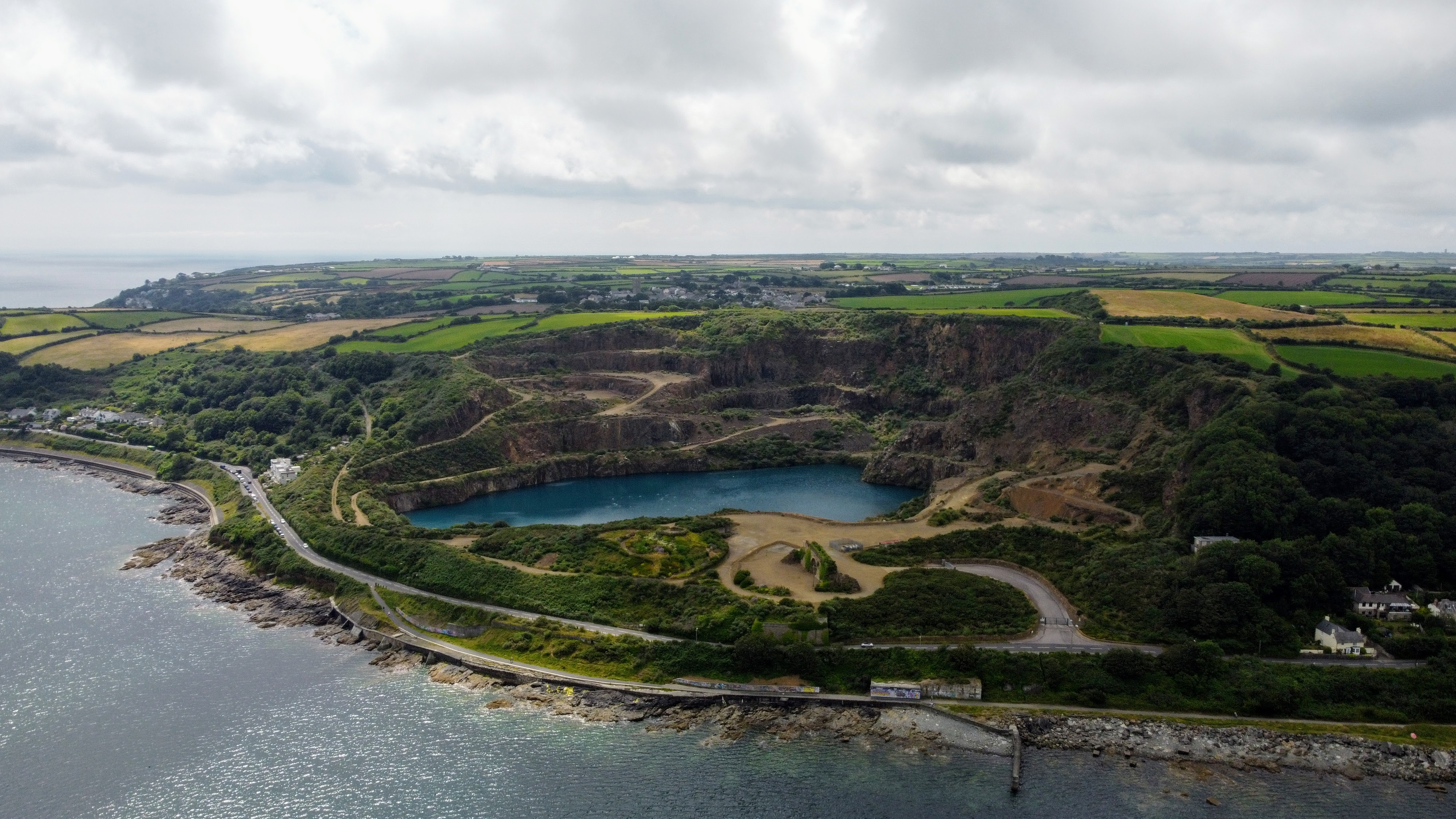
Penlee Quary

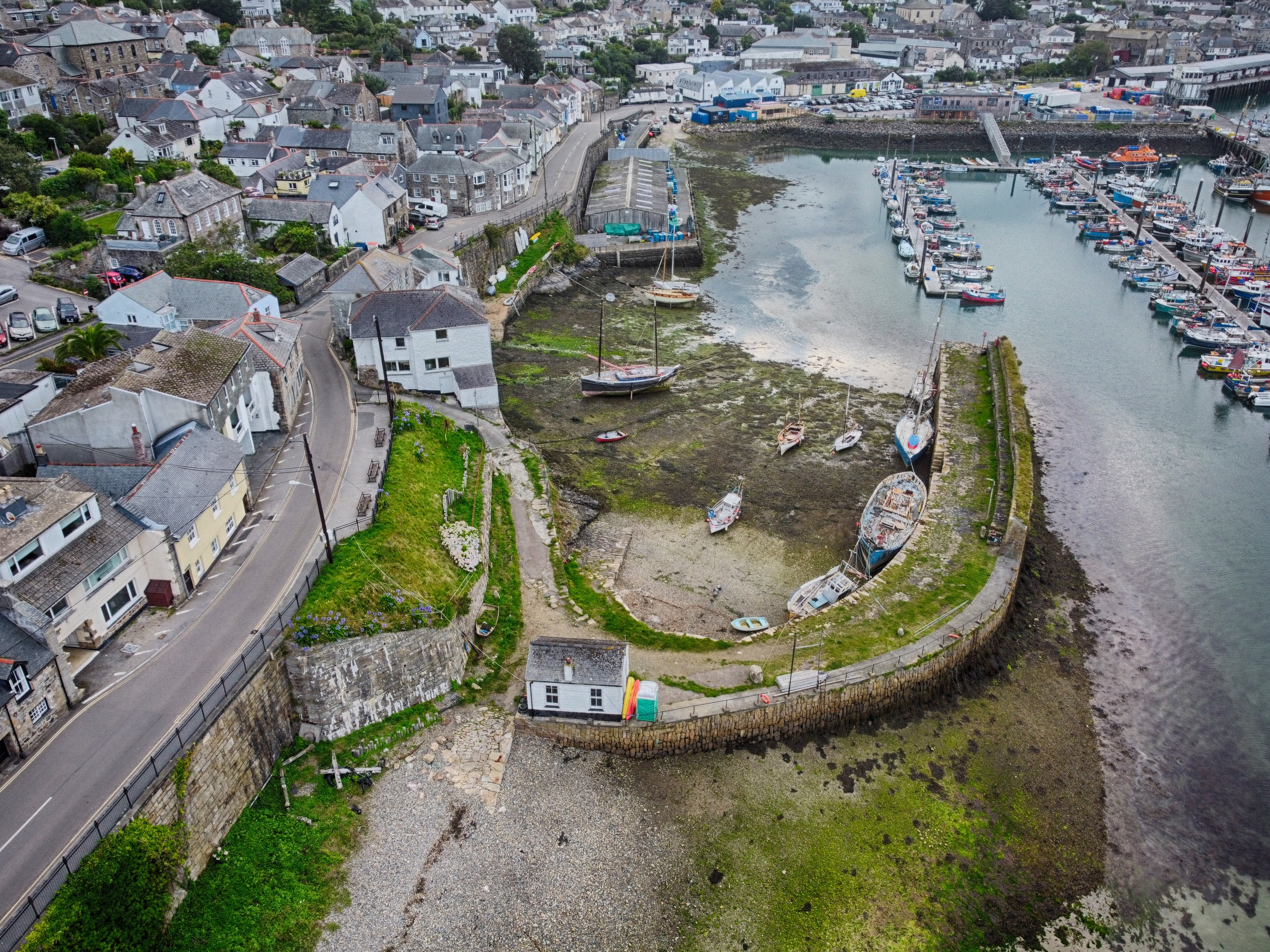
The Old Quay

Newlyn's economy is largely dependent on its harbour and the associated fishing industry; Newlyn Harbour is the largest fishing port in England. The port was a major catcher of pilchard until the 1960s. Today, a few vessels have resumed pilchard fishing and use a modern version of the ring net. The largest vessels are beam trawlers owned by W Stevenson and Sons Ltd, one of Cornwall's largest fish producers; most of the other vessels are owned by their skippers. The company based in the Old Pilchard Works today are major supplies of Cornish sardines and mixed-species fish. The fishing industry is hard work and markets are seasonably variable; Lamorna Ash experienced it for herself.

== Sport ==
=== Rugby ===
Newlyn RFC was formed in 1894 (or 1895) by the curate of St Peter's Church, the Rev Fred Peel Yates. The club amalgamated with Penzance RFC in 1944 to form Penzance and Newlyn RFC (The Pirates), currently known as the Cornish Pirates.

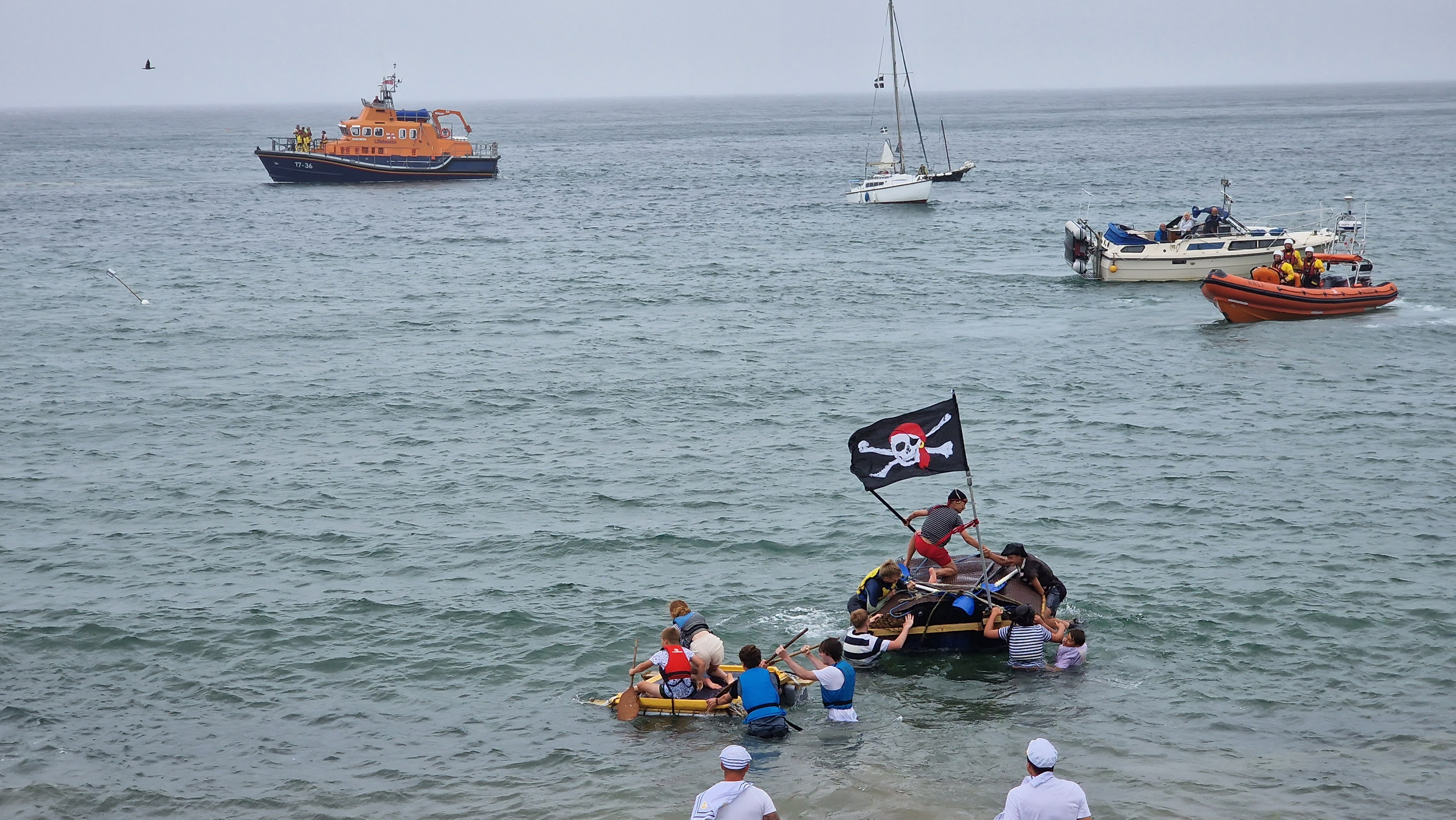
The Newlyn raft race takes part every year towards the end of August

=== Football ===
Newlyn Non-Athletico FC was formed in 1990 by a group of friends playing on Sunday mornings. They initially played in the West Penwith League, before joining the Mining League in 2002, the Trelawny League in 2011 and now the St Piran League in 2023. The club currently have two teams. The first team play home games at Mounts Bay Academy, and the reserves at 'The Aquarium' (Penzance Leisure Centre).

=== Cornish wrestling ===
Cornish wrestling tournaments, for prizes, have been held in Newlyn for centuries. Amongst other place, tournaments were held at Trewarveneth Farm.

== Food and music festival ==
Newlyn is home to the Newlyn fish festival which hosts live music, cooking demonstrations, and various marquees selling local produce.

== Notable landmarks ==
The UK National Tidal and Sea Level Facility (NTSLF) maintains a tidal observatory at Newlyn, and the UK fundamental benchmark is maintained there.

Newlyn was made famous in the 1880s and 1890s for its artists' colony, the Newlyn School, including the painters Thomas Cooper Gotch, Albert Chevallier Tayler and Henry Scott Tuke. The current largest collection of work by the Newlyn School is held by Penlee House gallery and museum in Penzance. A collection of Newlyn Copper, produced from circa 1890–1920, is on view at Penlee House. Newlyn is the home of Newlyn Art Gallery which houses a collection of modern art.

== Notable residents ==
- Nicholas Boson (1624–1708), writer in the Cornish language, member of a landowning and merchant family, involved in the pilchard fisheries.
- William Lovett (1800–1877), activist and leader of the Chartist political movement.
- W. S. Lach-Szyrma (1841-1915), local curate, 1873 to 1890, historian and science fiction writer
- Norman Garstin (1847–1926), artist, teacher, art critic and journalist, founding member of the Newlyn Art Gallery, died locally.
- Thomas Cooper Gotch (1854–1931), painter and book illustrator, lived locally and helped set up the Newlyn Art Gallery
- Stanhope Forbes (1857–1947), Irish artist and a founding member of the Newlyn school of painters
- John Pearson (1859– 1930), coppersmith master craftsman of Newlyn Copper
- Charles Holroyd (1861–1917), painter, worked locally, original printmaker and director of the National Gallery, 1906 to 1916.
- Gertrude Harvey (1879–1966), artist, active member of the Newlyn School and regular exhibitor at the Royal Academy of Arts
- Robert Hichens (1882–1940), one of seven quartermasters on board RMS Titanic, at the ship's wheel when the ship struck the iceberg
- Allan G. Wyon (1882–1962), die-engraver and sculptor and, in later life, vicar in Newlyn
- Obed Nicholls (1885–1962), a disabled artist in copper repousse in the Art Nouveau style
- Mary Jewels (1886–1977), painter, using a naïve style, mainly landscapes, portraits, fishing and harbour scenes in oil.
- Crosbie Garstin (1887–1930), poet, best-selling novelist, eldest son of the Newlyn School painter Norman Garstin, died in a boating accident in the Salcombe estuary.
- Ruth Simpson (1889–1964), artist, active member of the Newlyn School of artists and the Lamorna artists colony.
- Dod Procter (1890–1972), artist, best known for Impressionistic landscapes and "nearly sculptural studies of solitary female subjects."
- Marjorie Frances Bruford (1902–1958), artist associated with the Newlyn School, exhibited at the Newlyn Art Gallery
- Terry Frost (1915–2003), abstract artist, worked and died locally
- Brenda Wootton (1928–1994), a Cornish folk singer and poet
- Ray Atkins (born 1937), figurative artist, member of the St Ives School
- Richard Cook (born 1947), artist and painter, lives and works locally
- Mark Jenkin (born 1976), director, editor, screenwriter, cinematographer and producer; known for Bait (2019)
- Jack Nowell (born 1993), rugby union player, played 173 games for Exeter Chiefs and 46 for England
- Luke Cowan-Dickie (born 1993), rugby union player, played 164 games for Exeter Chiefs and 54 for England

== See also ==
- Listed buildings in Newlyn
- Penlee Quarry railway
