= A. F. Gallun & Sons =

Tannery in Milwaukee, Wisconsin

A.F. Gallun & Sons
- Industry: Leather production (tannery)
- Founded: 1858 in Milwaukee, Wisconsin
- Founders: August F. Gallun and Albert Gottlieb Trostel
- Defunct: 1993
- Products: Leather saddles, boots and harnesses

A. F. Gallun & Sons was one of the largest tanneries in Milwaukee, Wisconsin and one of the four largest tanneries in the United States.

== History ==
A. F. Gallun & Sons was founded in 1858 by August F. Gallun, who was part of the old pioneer families of Milwaukee. Gallun had been associated with Trostel and Gallun. Trostel carried on with Albert Trostel & Sons. Gallun's son, Albert F. Gallun eventually took over as president.

The tannery was located near the Milwaukee River in downtown Milwaukee.

== Closure ==
The tannery closed in 1993, citing its inability to keep up with the low cost of Asian competition and their production of cow leather. At the time the tannery was producing calf leather, not cow, and it felt it would not be economical to convert. By the time of its closure, the company was the last major calfskin tanner that supplied shoe manufacturers in the United States.

== Today ==
Parts of Holton and Water Streets in Milwaukee, Wisconsin are referred to as the Gallun Tannery Historic District and they were added to the National Register of Historic Places in 1983. In 2011, a portion of the tannery was razed after a wall collapse. The remainder has been redeveloped and converted into condominiums and apartments.
