= Newlyn Tidal Observatory =

British tidal observatory

- GLOSS ID 241
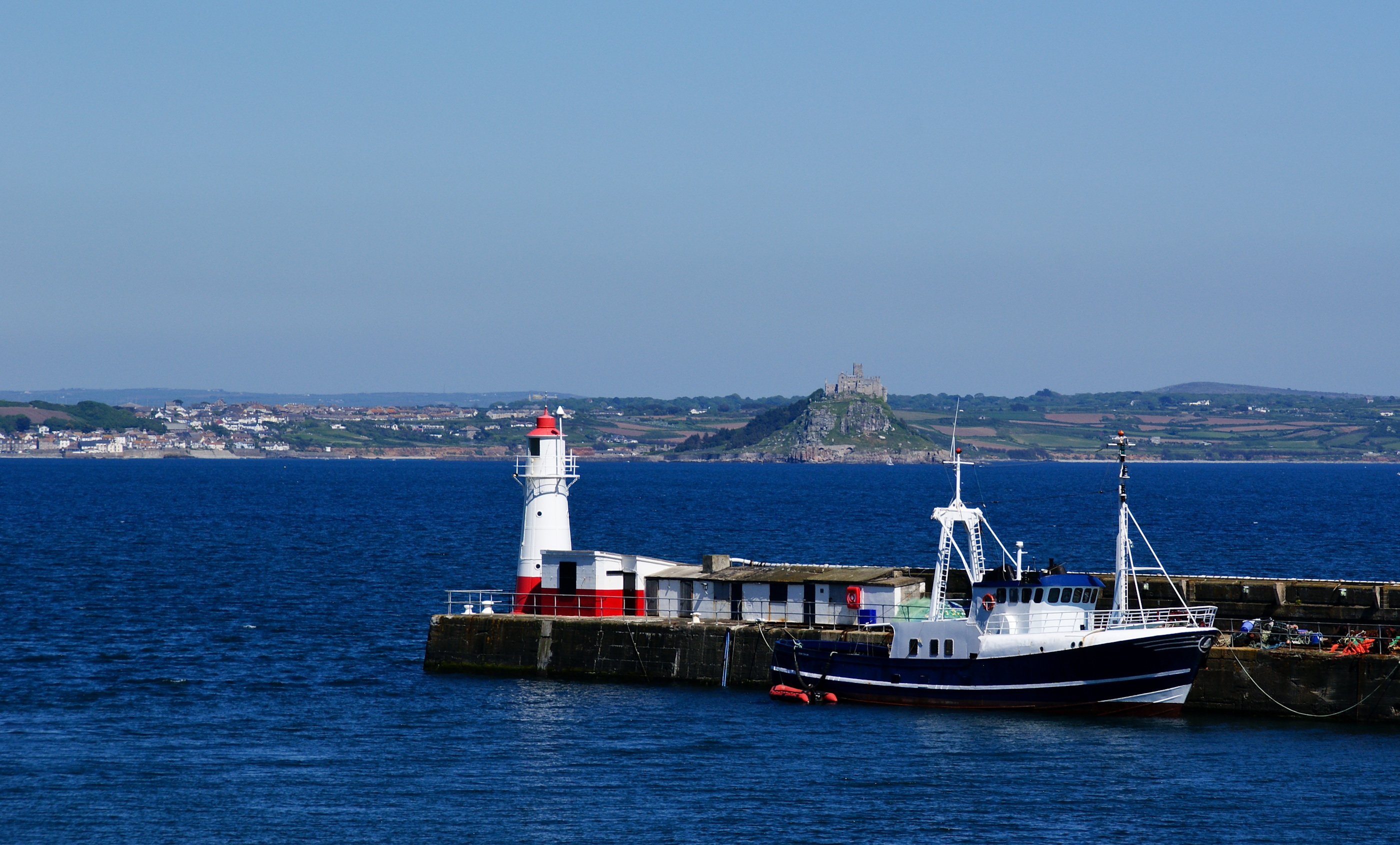
- View of Newlyn Harbour with the lighthouse and Tidal Observatory to its right

- Location within Cornwall
- 50.103000°N 5.542806°W
- Type: Tide gauge
- Location: Newlyn, Cornwall, England

History
- Built: 1915

Site notes
- Owner: National Oceanography Centre
- Website: ntslf.org/tgi/portinfo?port=Newlyn

Listed Building – Grade II
- Official name: Newlyn tidal observatory and part of the south pier
- Designated: 11 December 2018
- Reference no.: 1460225

Newlyn Tidal Observatory is a grade II listed tide gauge hut on the South Pier in Newlyn, Cornwall in England. Measurements of sea level taken at the observatory between 1915 and 1921 were used to define the reference level, Ordnance Datum Newlyn, for height measurement on the British mainland. The tide gauge has collected over 100 years of observations which has significantly contributed to studies in sea level science.

== Building and location ==
The observatory is a building situated behind the lighthouse at the end of the South Pier in Newlyn, near Penzance, in Cornwall. Constructed of concrete, it has the appearance of a small hut and is painted in red and white stripes. Inside the building is an Ordnance Survey benchmark, constituted of a brass bolt (OSBM SW 4676 2855), and a 1.6-metre (5 ft 3 in) diameter stilling well set into the pier which has ocean access via an inlet.

== History ==
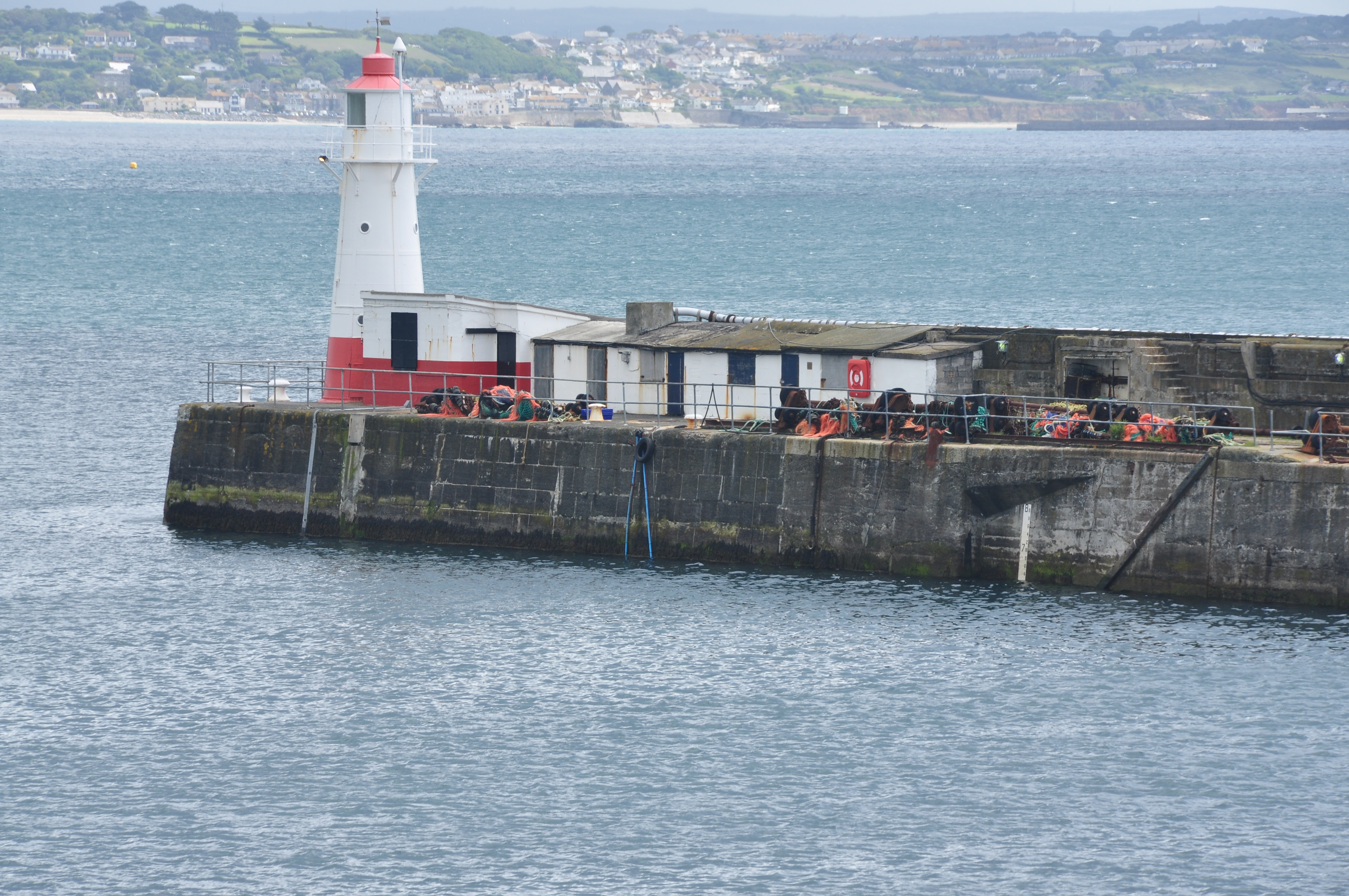
The observatory building in 2011

The Ordnance Survey established the observatory in 1915 to contribute to the measurement of a national vertical datum defined by mean sea level. The subsequent 6-year measurement campaign at the observatory, conducted from 1 May 1915 to 30 April 1921, determined the value of mean sea level as 4.751 m (15.59 ft) below the level of the brass bolt benchmark inside the hut. Due to the stable underlying granite bedrock, the proximity to the open ocean, and the absence of rivers, the observations at Newlyn were selected as the basis, or ordnance datum, for elevation measurements across Great Britain. To realise the reference datum across the country, in the early twentieth century spirit levelling techniques were used to measure a national network of circa 200 fundamental benchmarks, all referenced to the Newlyn brass bolt.

From 1915 to 1983 the observatory measured sea level using a float in the stilling well, along with a gauge supplied by Cary and Porter. With advances in technology, an Aanderaa pressure gauge was installed in 1981 to operate alongside the well gauge. Since 1983 the primary sensor has been a bubbler pressure gauge.

The Ordnance Survey operated the tide gauge until 1983, when the Natural Environment Research Council took over the management. The observatory was designated as grade II listed status by Historic England in December 2018. As of 2023 the observatory is operated by the National Oceanography Centre, and funding support is contributed by the UK Environment Agency.

== Impact ==
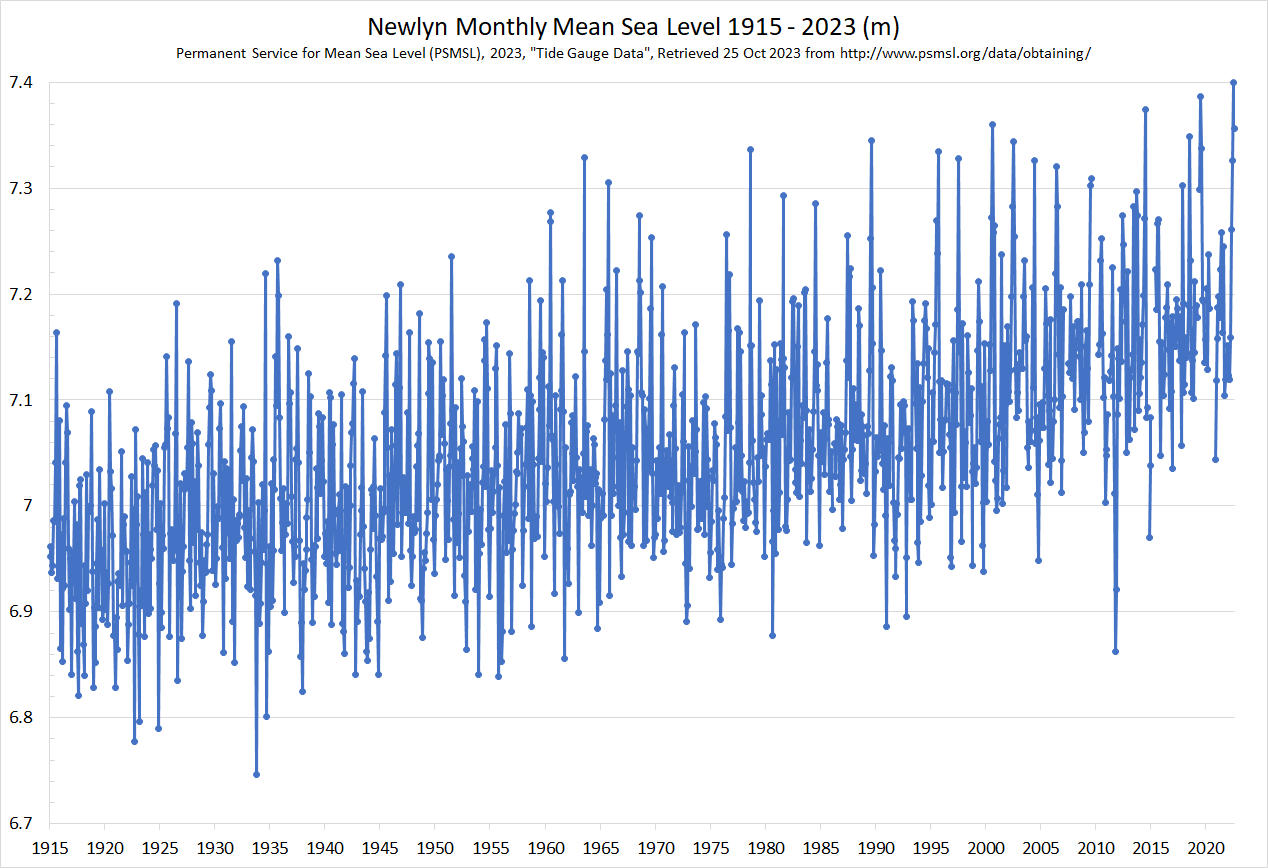
Time series plot of monthly Mean Sea Level at Newlyn, Cornwall, 1915 to 2023

The 6 years of observations captured at the observatory up to 1921 continue to define the height reference system for Great Britain, with varied applications including flood planning, understanding air pollution, infrastructure design, and deliveries by unmanned aerial vehicles.

In 2016 Bradshaw et al. published an article to commemorate 100 years of sea level measurements at the Newlyn observatory, in particular highlighting how the collected data had "played a fundamental role in UK geodesy and oceanography", and in 2021 the impact of the data on ocean and climate change studies was noted.

== See also ==
- Ordnance Survey National Grid – System of geographic grid references used in Great Britain
- Principal Triangulation of Great Britain – 1791–1853 geodetic survey of Britain
- Chart datum – Level of water from which depths displayed on a nautical chart are measured
