= Dod Procter =

English artist (1890–1972)

Dod Procter RA
- Self portrait, 1937
- Born: Doris Margaret Shaw; 21 April 1890; Hampstead, London, England
- Died: 31 July 1972 (aged 82); Redruth, Cornwall, England
- Education: Forbes School, Atelier Colarossi
- Known for: Painting
- Spouse: Ernest Procter
- Elected: President of St Ives Society of Artists (STISA)

Dod Procter RA (born Doris Margaret Shaw; 1890 – 1972) was an early twentieth-century English artist, best known for Impressionistic landscapes and delicate "nearly sculptural studies of solitary female subjects." Her sensual portrait, Morning, of a fisherman's daughter in Newlyn, caused a sensation. It was bought for the public by the Daily Mail in 1927.

Dod was married to the artist Ernest Procter. They attended art schools in England and in Paris together, where they were both influenced by Impressionism and the Post-Impressionism movements. They also worked together at times, sometimes sharing commissions and other times showing their work together in exhibitions.

Procter was a lifelong artist. After Ernest's untimely death in 1935, she travelled to the United States, Canada, Jamaica and Africa. She died in 1972 and is buried next to her husband at St Hilary Church, Cornwall. She was a member of several artists organisations, such as the Newlyn School and became President of St Ives Society of Artists (STISA) in 1966. Her work was exhibited at the Royal Academy on many occasions.

== Biography ==
=== Early life and education ===
Doris "Dod" Shaw was born in Hampstead, London in 1890. Her father was a ship's doctor and her mother was a former art student who had studied at the Slade School of Fine Art. The family moved to Tavistock in Devon, but after the death of her husband, Dod's mother moved the family to Newlyn in 1907. There, at the age of 15, Dod enrolled in the School of Painting run by Elizabeth Forbes and Stanhope Forbes. The Shaws stayed with two other Forbes students, Dod's cousin Cicely Jesse and another woman artist, Tennyson Jesse, in a large townhouse known as Myrtle Cottage. At Forbes, Dod met her future husband Ernest Procter; they were considered Forbes' star pupils. In Newlyn, Dod met Laura Knight, who became a lifelong friend and a considerable influence on her career.

In 1910 Dod and her mother went to Paris where Dod, alongside Ernest Procter, studied at the Atelier Colarossi. Dod and Ernest were both influenced by Impressionism and Post-Impressionism and the artists that they met in France, such as Pierre-Auguste Renoir and Paul Cézanne. The couple married in 1912 at the church in Paul in Cornwall and a year later their son Bill was born. The family established a home at North Corner in Cornwall. Also in 1913, Dod Procter first exhibited at the Royal Academy of Art.

During World War I Ernest served in France working with a Friends' Ambulance Unit detachment. The regular letters between the couple show Dod to be depressed at his absence as well as bored and short of money. After the war, the couple settled in Newlyn and this was the Procters' home for most of their working lives.

=== 1920s ===
In 1920 Dod and Ernest Procter were commissioned to decorate the Kokine Palace in Rangoon by a Chinese millionaire, Ching Tsong. The commission took a year and required them working with Burmese, Indian and Chinese craftsmen often painting murals at considerable heights within the palace. However Ching Tsong was unimpressed with their work and refused to pay them their agreed fees or provide accommodation so the Procters painted portraits of local people and members of the British colonial administration for an income. The Procters also created designs for etched crystal.

Dod Procter; Morning. Bought for the nation by the Daily Mail in 1927.

When she returned to England, Dod Procter began to focus on painting portraits, usually of young women. Throughout the 1920s Dod Procter continued to paint single female figures, sometimes nude, others in softly draped clothes. From around 1922, she painted a series of simplified, monumental images of young women of her acquaintance. They were typified by the volume of the figures, brought out by her use of light and shadow. The Back Bedroom (1926) and Girl on White (1923) were powerful, carefully observed portraits of young women. The Model, a portrait of a young women deep in concentration, was regarded as one of the best paintings shown at the Royal Academy in 1925. The model for the work was a Newlyn fisherman's 16-year-old daughter, Cissie Barnes, who also modelled, every day for five weeks, for Procter's best known work, Morning.

When Morning was displayed at the 1927 Royal Academy Summer Exhibition, it was voted Picture of the Year and bought by the Daily Mail for the Tate Gallery, where it now hangs. Procter sold the work for £300, but could have achieved ten times that amount. Prior to its permanent hanging in the Tate, Morning was shown in New York, and then on a two-year tour of Britain. A second, smaller version of the painting, known as Early Morning, is held by the Royal Pavilion in Brighton.

Both public and critics responded to Morning, praising its "sensuous but sombre style" which evoked the west Cornish "silver light". Frank Rutter, art critic of The Sunday Times, said in 1927 that Morning was "a new vision of the human figure which amounts to the invention of a twentieth century style in portraiture" and "She has achieved apparently with consummate ease that complete presentation of twentieth century vision in terms of plastic design after which Derain and other much praised French painters have been groping for years past." Despite this, a number of the nude paintings by Procter that accompanied Morning on tour were deemed unsuitable for display by some venues. Also considered controversial was Procter's 1929 submission to the Royal Academy. Virginal showed a young female nude holding a dove and when the Academy rejected the painting the story was reported in the several national newspapers.

As well as Cissie Barnes other women who modelled for Procter included the artist Midge Bruford and also Eileen Mayo, who had come to Newlyn to model for Laura Knight and became an artist in her own right.

=== 1930s and after ===
In the 1930s Procter's style of painting changed completely. Works such as The Orchard (1934), Sheila Among the Ferns (1935) and Kitchen at Myrtle Cottage (1935) display the meticulous finish and lighting of her earlier work but without her previous hard lines and solidly delineated bodies of colour. A floral design by Procter was among the winning entries in the 1933 Famous Artists competition run by Cadbury's for a series of chocolate box designs and which were displayed at the Leicester Galleries in London. Ernest Procter died unexpectedly while travelling in 1935. The couple had often staged joint exhibitions at the Leicester Galleries and Dod continued to do so after Ernest's death.

In 1938, Procter decided to move to Zennor, near her friend, the artist Alethea Garstin. The subjects of her pictures were largely portraits and flowers. Garstin's influence was apparent in Procter's work in the latter part of her career. She became a full member of the Royal Academy in 1942.

In the early 1940s Procter illustrated four children's books written by Clare Collas: Four’s Company: a children's fantasy (London: Peter Davies, 1942), The Flying Village: an improbable story (London, 1943), The Blue-Coated Heron: an adventurous story (London: Peter Davies, 1944) and Penny for the Guy (London, 1945).

Procter visited Tenerife in 1938 and again, with her friend, the artist Jeanne du Maurier, in 1946. In 1948, she visited Basutoland and in 1964 went to Tanganyika. During the 1950s Procter spent some time in Jamaica, with Garstin, where she mainly painted portraits of children.

During her lifetime and after her death her work fell out of favour. But in the 21st century, she was featured in several gallery exhibitions and her works are collected in British museums, including the Tate. Photographs of Procter are in the collection of National Portrait Gallery, London.

== Memberships ==
Procter was a member of, or affiliated with, the following organisations:

- Associate of the Royal Academy (ARA), from 1934
- New English Art Club (NEAC), from 1929
- Newlyn Society of Artists (NSA), Newlyn, Cornwall
- Penwith Society of Arts, from 1949
- Royal Academy, from 1942
- SRA, 1966
- St Ives Society of Artists (STISA), from 1937 to 1949, President 1946

== List of works ==
The following are a list of some of Procter's works:

- African Head - Painting, Oil on board
- Ancilla with an Orange- Painting, Oil on canvas
- Anemones - 1936, Painting, Oil on canvas
- Aunt Lilla - 1946, Painting, Oil on canvas
- Autumn Flowers - Painting, Oil on canvas
- Blue (Painting of a young girl) -1938, Painting, Oil on canvas
- Boys and Coconuts - 1945, Painting, Oil on canvas
- Mornings - 1929, Painting, Oil on canvas, 30x60cm
- Early Morning, Newlyn - 1926, Painting, Oil on canvas
- Eileen Mayo - Painting, Oil on canvas
- Flowers on a chair - Painting, Oil on canvas
- Gabriel in St. Lucia - Painting, Oil on canvas
- A Girl Asleep - 1925. Painting, Oil on canvas
- Girl in Blue - 1925, Painting, Oil on canvas
- Girl With a Parrot - Painting, Oil on canvas
- Glass - 1935, Painting, Oil on canvas
- The Golden Girl - 1930, Painting, Oil on canvas
- The Innocent - Painting, Oil on canvas
- Jamaican Girl - 1960, Painting, Oil on canvas
- Kitchen at Myrtle Cottage - 1930, Painting, Oil on canvas
- Lilian - 1923, Painting, Oil on canvas, 52x42cm
- Little Sister - Painting, Oil on canvas
- Midge Bruford, The Model - Painting, Oil on canvas
- Nasturtiums - Painting, Oil on canvas
- The Orchard - 1934, Painting, Oil on canvas
- The Pearl Necklace - Painting, Oil on canvas
- The Quiet Hour - 1935, Painting, Oil on canvas
- Self Portrait - Painting, Oil on canvas
- Sketch of Burmese Children - Painting, Oil on canvas
- The Sunday Shirt -1957, Painting, Oil on canvas
- Tolcarne Inn - 1935, Painting, Oil on canvas
- Young Roman - c. 1938-29, Painting, Oil on canvas
- Winter Scene from the Artist’s House, Newlyn - Painting, Oil on canvas

== Exhibitions ==
Her works were exhibited:

- 1913: Royal Academy
- 1918: International Society;
- 1921 - 1926: Newlyn Art Gallery (NAG)
- 1922 onwards: Royal Academy, including 1927's exhibit of Morning
- 1928: International Exhibition, the Carnegie Institute
- 1935: Carl Fischer Gallery, New York, also in 1936
- New English Art Club
- Leicester Galleries

Posthumous:

- 1985: Painting in Newlyn 1900-1930, NAG & Barbican (touring)
- 1987: Looking West, Paintings inspired by Cornwall 1880s to present day, NAG
- 1989: A Century of Art in Cornwall, 1889-1989, CCC centenary, Truro
- 1990: Dod Procter RA and Ernest Procter ARA, Newlyn Orion with Laing Art Gallery, Newcastle
- 1992: Artists from Cornwall, RWE, Bristol (selected)
- 1996: Women Artists in Cornwall (mixed), Falmouth Art Gallery
- 2002: Under the Open Sky (mixed), Penlee House Museum & Art Gallery
- 2007: Dod Procter, Penlee House Art Gallery

== Museum and gallery holdings ==
Selected holdings:

- Birkenhead Williamson Art Gallery and Museum: Anemones
- Brighton Museum & Art Gallery): Early Morning (1927, oil on canvas, reduced version of 'Morning' at the Tate Gallery)
- Bristol Royal West of England Academy: Ancilla with an Orange (1956, oil on canvas), Flowers on a Chair
- Bristol Museums, Galleries and Archives: Winter Scene from the Artist's House, Newlyn
- Burnley (Towneley Hall Art Gallery and Museum): The Hall Table
- Hanley Potteries Museum & Art Gallery: Clara, Girl in White
- Hastings Jerwood Gallery: Lilian, Glass
- Hull Ferens Art Gallery: Young Roman (c. 1928-1929, oil on canvas)
- Leamington Spa (Mus & AG): An Innocent, or A New Day (oil on canvas)
- London Tate: Morning (1926); Kitchen at Myrtle Cottage (1930-1935); Orchard (1934)
- London Royal Academy of Arts (1946) Autumn Flowers (c. 1932-41), The Pearl Necklace, Jamaican Girl
- Melbourne National Gallery of Victoria: In a Strange Land (1919, oil on canvas)
- Newcastle-upon-Tyne Laing Art Gallery Girl in Blue
- Penzance Penlee House: Aunt Lilla (c. 1943), Gabriel in St Lucia, Self Portrait, Little Sister, "Tolcarne Inn"
- Plymouth City Council Museum and Art Gallery: African Head
- Sefton Atkinson Art Gallery and Library: Sketch of Burmese Children
- Sheffield Museums: Nasturtiums
- Southampton Southampton City Art Gallery: Black and White
- Swansea Glynn Vivian Art Gallery: Early Morning, Newlyn
- Walsall The New Art Gallery Walsall: Spring Flowers, The Quiet Hour
- Woking Ingram Collection of Modern British Art at The Lightbox: The Golden Girl
