= Albert F. Gallun =

Leather-tanning company president

Albert F. Gallun (January 2, 1865 – December 5, 1938) was president of A. F. Gallun & Sons in Milwaukee, Wisconsin. At the time, the company was one of the four largest leather-tanning operations in the United States.

== Early life ==
Gallun was born in 1865 and attended the German-English Academy in Milwaukee.

== Career ==
He worked at Trostel & Gallun which had been founded in 1858 by his father, August F. Gallun, and Albert Trostel. When Trostel & Gallun split, August F. Gallun opened A. F. Gallun & Sons. Alfred became president of the company in the 1890s and retired in 1928. He and his brother, Arthur, studied modern methods of tanning leather practiced throughout the world and were recognized as authorities on the industry and the scientific principles involved. They were considered pioneers in the industry in the chrome method of tanning. A short time before World War I, they established a research department at Columbia University for the tanning industry which was paid for by A. F. Gallun & Sons and the university. Gallun was also a director of Marshall & Ilsley bank.

== Personal life ==
Gallun was married to Hedwig Mann, of Two Rivers, Wisconsin, who died in 1932. They had four children: Elinor, Edwin A., Albert F. Gallun Jr., and Gladys.

Gallun helped found the village of Chenequa, Wisconsin.

He died at his Milwaukee, Wisconsin residence.

=== Residence ===
Gallun's mansion, built in 1914, is part of the NRHP Kenwood Park-Prospect Hill Historic District. It is referred to as the Gallun Mansion and as the Pritzlaff mansion, as it was inherited by his daughter who married hardware store executive John C. Pritzlaff. It was donated to the University of Wisconsin–Milwaukee, which sold the property.
