= August F. Gallun =

German-American businessman (1834–1912)

August Friedrich Gallun (May 30, 1834 – 1912) was the founder of A. F. Gallun & Sons which operated their "Empire Tannery" in Milwaukee, Wisconsin.

He was born in Osterwieck-on-the-Harz, Germany.

He came to the United States in 1854 from a family of leather tanners. His father and grandfather had been engaged in the business in Germany.

In 1864 he married Julia Kraus and they went on to have four children, Albert F. Gallun, Ella, Edwin (who died at the age of 22), and Arthur H. Gallun.

He was employed by Albert Trostel and after 9 months of employment, they founded Trostel & Gallun. They were well known for harness, saddle, collar and line leather, boot and shoe grains, wax upper, and kip and calf skins.

After 8 years together, their partnership dissolved and each went into business with their sons. Gallun founded A. F. Gallun & Sons. They did business across the United States, and also some in Europe and South America.

Parts of Holton and Water Streets in Milwaukee, Wisconsin are referred to as the Gallun Tannery Historic District and they were added to the NRHP in 1983.
