= Blackiston =

Blackiston may refer to:

- Blackiston, Delaware, an unincorporated community in Kent County, Delaware, United States
- Blackiston Formation, a geologic formation in Indiana, United States

== People with the surname ==
- Galton Blackiston, English chef
- Portia Spennie Blackiston, American educator and clubwoman

== See also ==
- Blackiston Mill, Indiana, an unincorporated community in Floyd County, Indiana, United States
