= Smock-frock =

Traditional rural man's outer garment

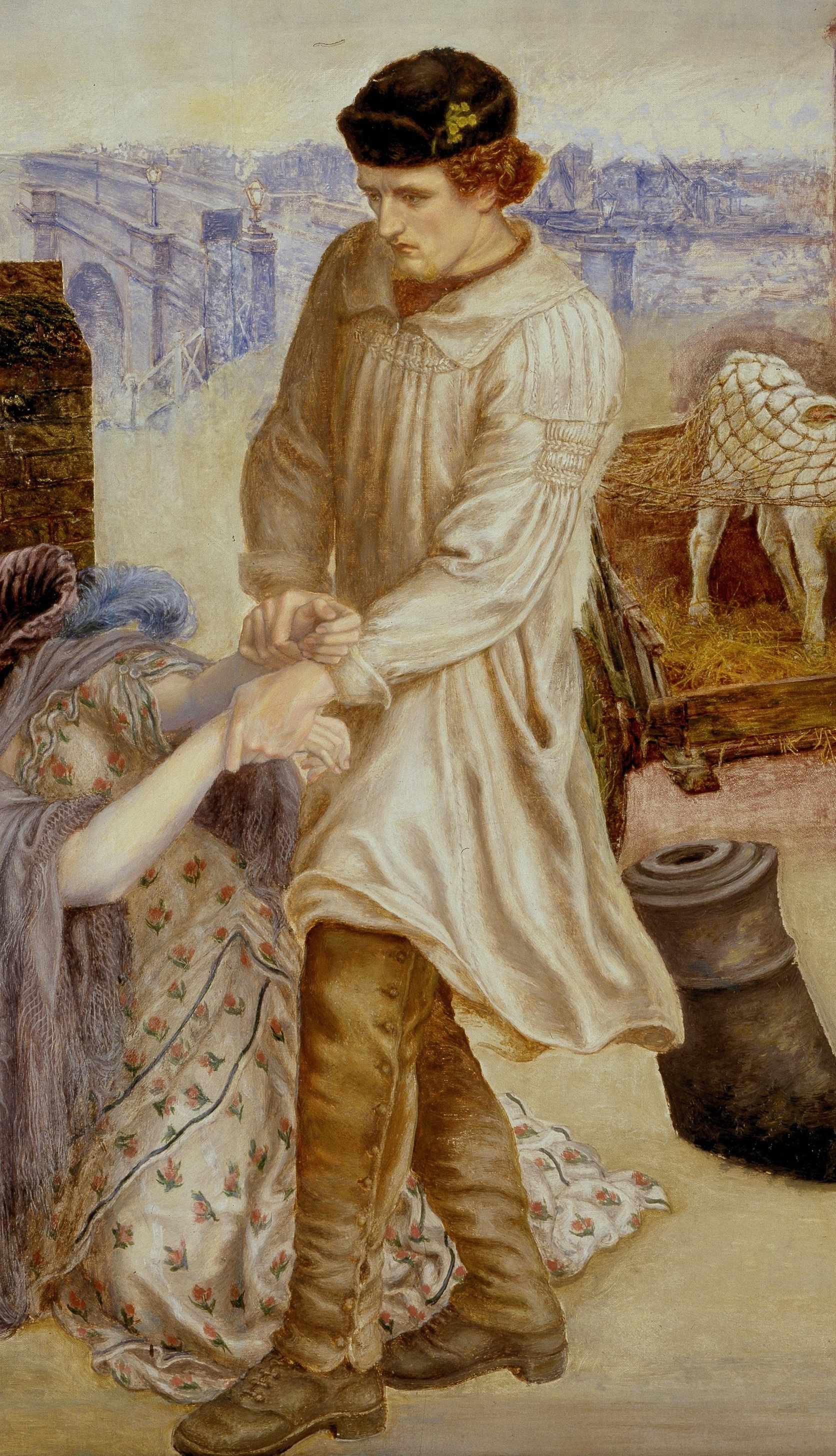
A 19th-century shepherd in a smock-frock. Detail from Found by Dante Gabriel Rossetti, 1854.

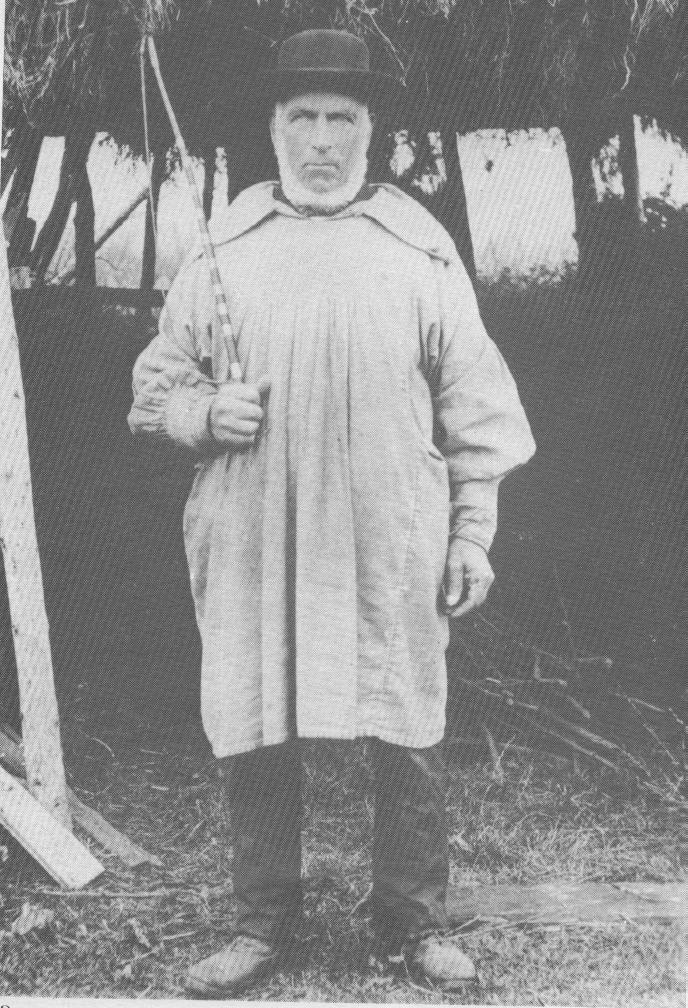
Old man wearing a smock and carrying a whip

A smock-frock or smock is an outer garment traditionally worn by rural workers, especially shepherds and waggoners. Today, the word smock refers to a loose overgarment worn to protect one's clothing, for instance by a painter.

The traditional smock-frock is made of heavy linen or wool and varies from thigh-length to mid-calf length. Characteristic features of the English smock-frock are fullness across the back, breast, and sleeves folded into "tubes" (narrow unpressed pleats) held in place and decorated by smocking, a type of surface embroidery in a honeycomb pattern across the pleats that controls fullness while allowing a degree of stretch.

== Types of smock-frocks ==
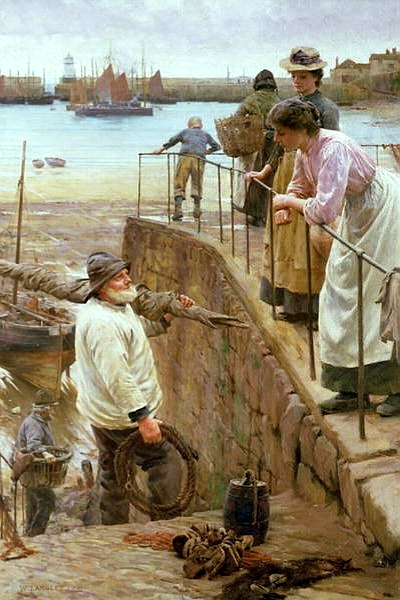
Walter Langley, Between the Tides, 1901, Fishermen wear knit-frocks and fisherman's smocks

- The round smock is a pullover style with an open neckline and a flat, round collar. This smock is reversible front-to-back. A feature of Sussex smocks or round frocks is the lack of elaborate decoration; instead there is fine embroidery on the yoke, collar, cuffs and shoulder. Sussex smocks were thought to be the most elaborate of smocks.
- The shirt smock or Surrey smock is styled like a man's shirt, with a collar and a short placket opening in the front. It is not reversible.
- The coat smock worn by Welsh shepherds is long and buttons up the front in the manner of a coat.
- The fisherman's smock is a reversible hardwearing sailcloth smock typically dyed indigo (or white or red colour) once worn as an outer garment by Atlantic fishermen across Devon, Cornwall, Brittany and the Channel Islands, and other parts of Northwestern Europe, often worn over a knitted gansey. It is now often favoured as an artist's smock by association with the Newlyn School who often depicted characters in this dress.
- The knit-frock (Cornish use), Gansey or Guernsey is a worsted knitted form of the fisherman's smock, often patterned and dyed indigo, it was again traditionally fully reversible and was again found throughout the fishing communities of the Atlantic from Brittany to the Netherlands. It was often oversized to midthigh.

== Development ==
Detail from May Day by Kate Greenaway. The child in green wears a smock-frock.

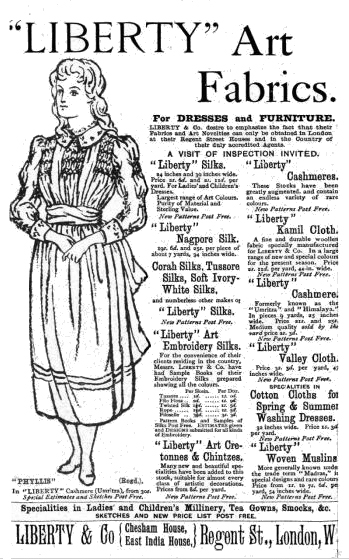
Liberty art fabrics advertisement showing a smocked dress, May 1888

It is uncertain whether smock-frocks are "frocks made like smocks" or "smocks made like frocks"—that is, whether the garment evolved from the smock, the shirt or underdress of the medieval period, or from the frock, an overgarment of equally ancient origin. What is certain is that the fully developed smock-frock resembles a melding of the two older garments.

From the earlier 18th century, the smock-frock was worn by waggoners and carters; by the end of that century, it had become the common outer garment of agricultural labourers of all sorts throughout the Midlands and Southern England. The spread of the smock-frock matches a general decrease in agricultural wages and living standards in these areas in the second half of the 18th century. The smocks were cheaper than other forms of outer garments, and were both durable and washable.

Embroidery styles for smock-frocks varied by region, and a number of motifs became traditional for various occupations: wheel-shapes for carters and waggoners, sheep and crooks for shepherds, and so on. Most of this embroidery was done in heavy linen thread, often in the same color as the smock.

By the mid-19th century, wearing of traditional smock-frocks by country labourers was dying out, although Gertrude Jekyll (born 1843) noticed them in Sussex during her youth, and smocks were still worn by some people in rural Buckinghamshire into the 1920s. As the authentic tradition was fading away, a romantic nostalgia for England's rural past, as epitomised by the illustrations of Kate Greenaway, led to a fashion for women's and children's dresses and blouses loosely styled after smock-frocks. These garments are generally of very fine linen or cotton and feature delicate smocking embroidery done in cotton floss in contrasting colours; smocked garments with pastel-coloured embroidery remain popular for babies.

== Parachutist smocks ==
During World War II, military parachutists wore wind-proof jump smocks primarily to cover equipment that may have caused the parachutist to be stuck in a narrow doorway. German parachutists wore the Knochensack, British parachutists wore the Denison smock whilst US Marine paramarines wore a jump smock as well. Today the name smock is still used for military combat jackets. Examples include DPM Parachute Smock, that replaced the Denison Smock, the Canadian Para Smock and Smock Windproof DPM.

== Related garments ==
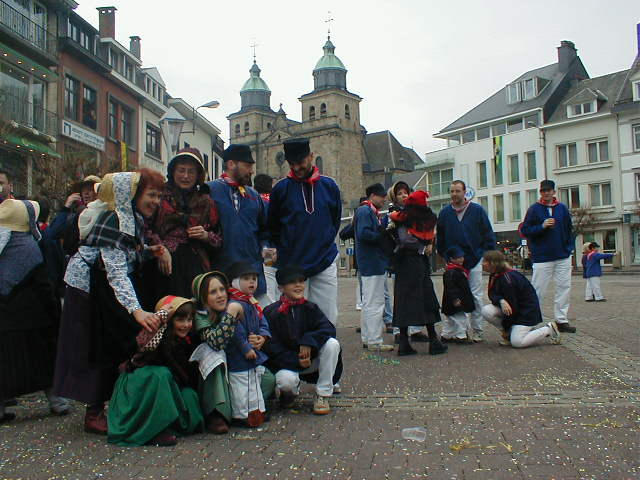
Men wearing the traditional Walloon bleu sårot

The Walloon bleu sårot is a dark blue smock worn by men in parts of Belgium as part of national dress.

The Lèine bhàn was a type of smock worn to church by Scottish men who had broken the law.

== See also ==
- Apron
- Pinafore
- Tabard
- Chemise/Smock
- Frock
- Frock coat
- Gymnastyorka
- Smock mill
- Kirtle
- Surcoat
- Kappōgi
- Artistic dress movement
- Embroidery
