= Portia (given name) =

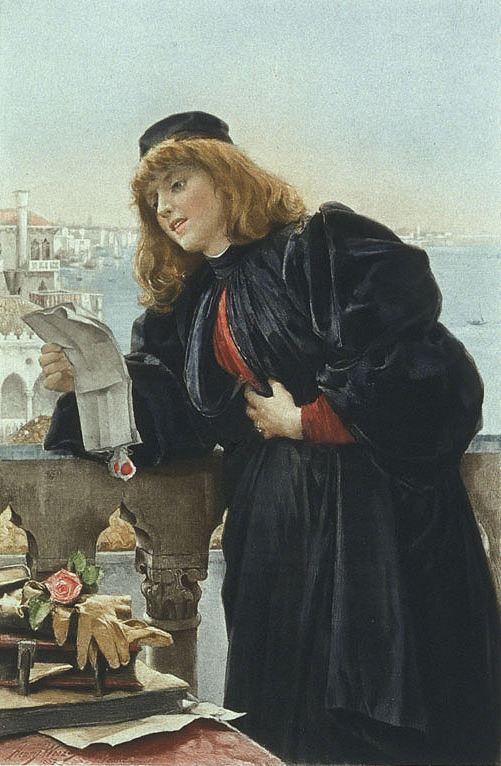
- Portia from William Shakespeare's The Merchant of Venice by Henry Woods.
- Gender: Female
- Language: Latin

Origin
- Meaning: Pig

Portia is a feminine given name taken from the name of the Roman Porcia gens, which was ultimately derived from the Latin porcus; porcus translates to pig. It is best known as a character who disguises herself as a man to act as an imposter judge and save the life of Antonio in William Shakespeare's The Merchant of Venice. Porsha is a modern misspelling variant.

== Women ==
- Portia (wife of Brutus) or Porcia, the wife of Roman senator Marcus Junius Brutus
- Portia Arthur (born 1990), Ghanaian author, writer and reporter
- Portia Spennie Blackiston (1898–1973), American educator and clubwoman
- Portia Dawson, American actress
- Portia de Rossi or Portia DeGeneres, Australian-born actress
- Portia Doubleday, American actress
- Portia Geach (1873–1959), Australian artist and feminist
- Portia Holman (1903–1983), Australian child psychiatrist
- Portia Mansfield (1887–1979), American dance educator and choreographer
- Portia Robinson (1926–2023), Australian historian
- Portia Holmes Shields, American academic administrator
- Portia Simpson-Miller, political leader of Jamaica's People's National Party and Prime Minister of Jamaica
- Portia White, Canadian singer
- Portia Wu (born 1970), American lawyer
- Portia Zvavahera (born 1985), Zimbabwean painter

== Pen name ==
- Portia, pen name of Abigail Adams (1744–1818)
- Portia, pen name of Grizelda Elizabeth Cottnam Tonge (1803–1825)

== Fictional ==
- Portia (The Merchant of Venice), a character in William Shakespeare's play The Merchant of Venice
- Portia Quayne, the protagonist in The Death of the Heart by Elizabeth Bowen
- Portia Gibbons, a character on The Mighty B!
- Portia, a minor character in The Hunger Games
- Portia Copeland, a character in Carson McCullers' novel The Heart Is a Lonely Hunter
- Portia Blake, the lead character in the American radio and television soap opera Portia Faces Life
- Portia, a spider protagonist in Children of Time, a novel by Adrian Tchaikovsky
- Portia, Door's mother in Neverwhere, a novel by Neil Gaiman
- Portia Featherington, the matriarch of the Featherington family in the Bridgerton novels and Netflix television adaptation.
- Princess Portia, a character in the animated fantasy film Barbie: Princess Charm School.
- Portia, from the "Spencer and Portia" segments of 101 Dalmatian Street
- Portia Maye, the Houndmaster in the video game Dead by Daylight
- Portia Weever, a character in Waterloo Road
- Portia, named after the Shakespearean character, a lead character in the 2015 musical Something Rotten!
