= Motherless (disambiguation) =

Motherless is the state of being without a mother.

Motherless may also refer to:

- Motherless (film), a 2022 Iranian film
- Motherless (painting), an 1895 painting by Walter Langley
- Motherless (sculpture), an 1889 sculpture by George Anderson Lawson
- Motherless (website), a pornographic video-sharing website

== See also ==
- Orphan
