= Exie =

Exie can refer to:

- Exie, Kentucky, United States, an unincorporated community
- Exie Lee Hampton (1893–1979), American teacher and community leader
- Owen Exie J Hurcum (born 1997), British former politician
