= Arthur Deane =

Scottish botanist and photographer (1875–1954)

Arthur Deane FRSE MRIA (1875 – 1954) was a Scottish botanist and photographer. He was the first director of botany at the Ulster Museum. He specialised in trees and in photo-micrographs of cell samples.

== Life ==
He was born in Glasgow on 6 June 1875.

From 1901 to 1905, he was the assistant curator of Warrington Museum. In 1905, he moved to be director of the Belfast Museum in Ireland (later renamed as the Ulster Museum).

He made an extensive study of trees, including multiple cell studies in the form of photo-micrographs including a large number of species from the Indian subcontinent. During his time at Warrington, he provided 186 micrographs to Herbert Stone's book, The Timbers of Commerce and Their Identification.

He was elected a Fellow of the Royal Society of Edinburgh in 1923. His proposers were Sir John Arthur Thomson, John Symington, Sir John James Burnet and William Evans Hoyle. From 1947 to 1950, he was president of the Belfast Natural History and Philosophical Society.

He died in Ballycarry in Northern Ireland on 12 January 1954.
