= Portia (The Merchant of Venice) =

Character in The Merchant of Venice

- The Merchant of Venice character
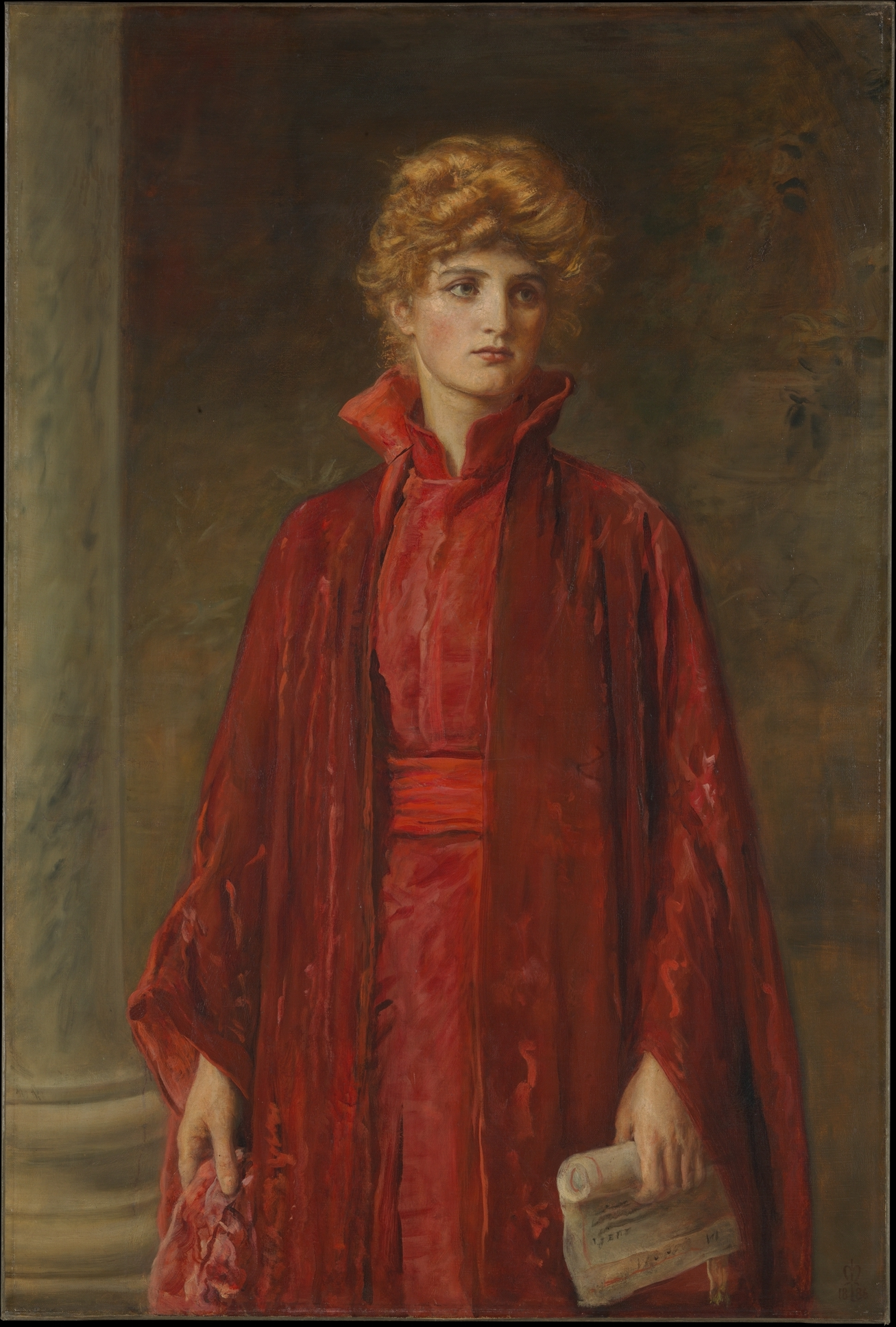
- Portia by John Everett Millais, 1886
- First appearance: The Merchant of Venice; c. 1596–98
- Created by: William Shakespeare
- Based on: Porcia (wife of Brutus)
- Portrayed by: Boy players (Original Elizabethan version); Frances Abington; Sarah Siddons; Elizabeth Whitlock; Maggie Smith; Claire Bloom; Sybil Thorndike; Joan Plowright; Caroline John; Lynn Collins; Lily Rabe; Gemma Jones

In-universe information
- Alias: Balthazar
- Occupation: Heiress; also disguises herself as a lawyer
- Family: Unnamed father (deceased)
- Significant other: Bassanio
- Religion: Catholic
- Nationality: Venetian

Portia is a female protagonist in The Merchant of Venice by William Shakespeare. In creating her character, Shakespeare drew from the historical figure of Porcia – the daughter of Cato the Younger – as well as several parts of the Bible.

Portia is fond of proverbs, frequently quoting them, which was considered a sign of wisdom and intellect in the Elizabethan era. It has been suggested that the character of Portia was based on Queen Elizabeth, who was reigning at the time the play was written, and who also had a penchant for proverbs.

== Character ==
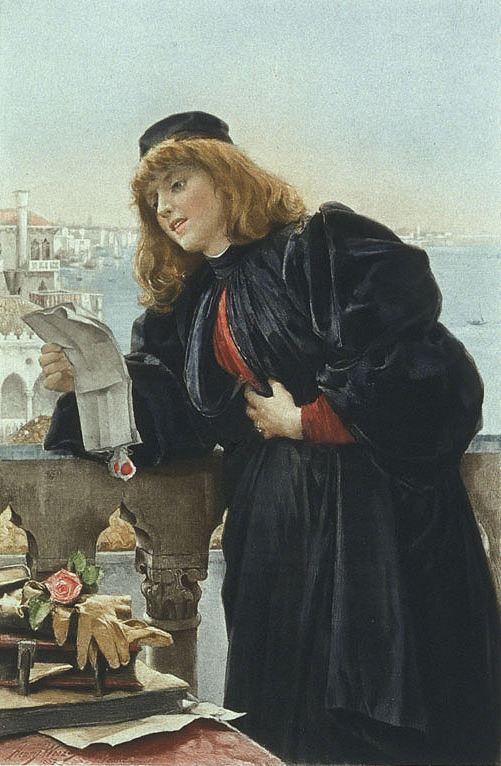
Portia (1888) by Henry Woods

In Shakespeare's play, Portia is a wealthy heiress in Belmont, a fictional estate near Venice. She is bound by a lottery outlined in her father's will, which allows potential suitors to choose one of three caskets made of gold, silver, and lead, respectively. If they choose the correct casket containing Portia's portrait and a scroll, they win her hand in marriage. Portia is glad when two suitors, one driven by greed and another by vanity, fail to choose correctly. She favors Bassanio, a young but impoverished Venetian noble.

Later in the play, she disguises herself as a man and then assumes the role of a lawyer, Balthazar, whereby she saves the life of Bassanio's friend Antonio in court. In the court scene, Portia finds a technicality in the bond, as it does not allow for the removal of blood, thereby outwitting the Jewish moneylender Shylock and saving Antonio from giving the pound of flesh demanded when everyone else, including the Duke presiding as judge, fails. It is Portia who delivers one of the most famous speeches in The Merchant of Venice:

The quality of mercy is not strained.
It droppeth as the gentle rain from heaven
Upon the place beneath. It is twice blest:
It blesseth him that gives and him that takes.

In the end, Portia and Bassanio go on to live together along with the former's lady-in-waiting, Nerissa, and her husband, Gratiano.

Harold Fisch argued that the words of Deuteronomy 32:2, "My doctrine shall drop as the rain, my speech shall distil as the dew; as the small rain upon the tender grass, and as the showers upon the herb," were echoed in the first words of the speech, "The quality of mercy is not strained. / It droppeth as the gentle rain from heaven / Upon the place beneath."

== Critics ==
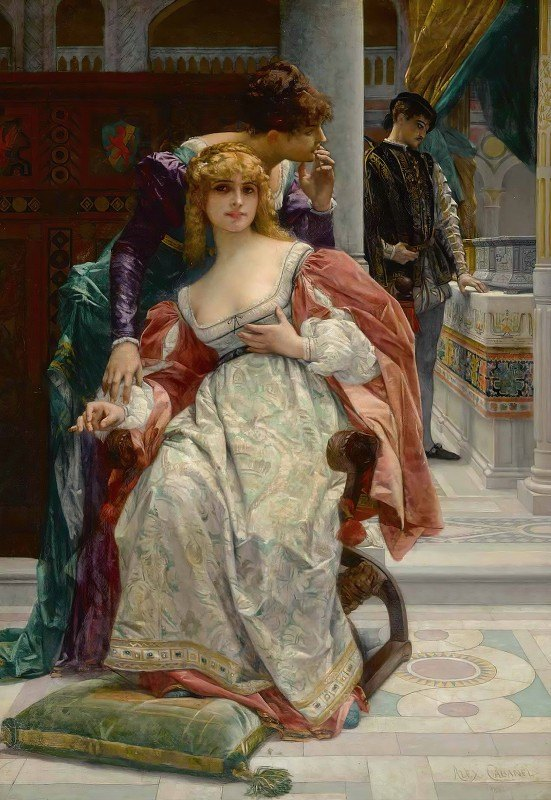
La belle Portia (1886) Alexandre Cabanel

In her book Shakespeare's Daughters, critic Sharon Hamilton categorizes Portia as one of Shakespeare's women who act instead of their (absent) father. Additionally, rather than being subdued by her society's restrictive feminine model, she is "confident, witty, and resourceful." Susan Oldrieve notes that while Portia rebels against patriarchal control, she eventually relents, "partly out of trust and duty, and partly because she finds that it ultimately works to her advantage."

Critics disagree about the extent of help Portia gives Bassanio in her test, the choosing of the caskets. In 1876, the critic J. Weiss was the first to assert that Portia assists Bassanio. More recent critics that take this view are S. F. Johnson, in "How Many Ways Portia Informs Bassanio's Choice," and Michael Zuckert in "The New Medea: On Portia's Comic Triumph in The Merchant of Venice," both in 1996. Opposing this view is Robert Hapgood in "Portia and The Merchant of Venice: The Gentle Bond" (1967) and Corinne S. Abate in "Nerissa Teaches Me What to Believe: Portia's Wifely Empowerment in The Merchant of Venice" (2002).

Despite her lack of formal legal training, Portia wins her case by referring to the exact language of the law. The tactics she uses are, in modern terms, referred to as a "Philadelphia lawyer." These tactics help demonstrate her power in the court, contrasting with her earlier lack of choice in the marriage.

However, such tactics also lead to further discussions about the use and abuse of rhetoric. As a vital concept of civic life during the Elizabethan era, rhetoric often indicates an individual's wit (in a way, similar to the modern term "Intellect"), while at the same time intricately linked to moral issues as it possesses the potential to obfuscate distinctions between right and wrong. For example, the abuse of rhetoric skills is brought to light by Portia – highlighting the idea that an unjust argument may win through eloquence, loopholes and technicalities, regardless of the moral question at hand – and thus provoking the audience to consider that issue.

== Portrayals ==
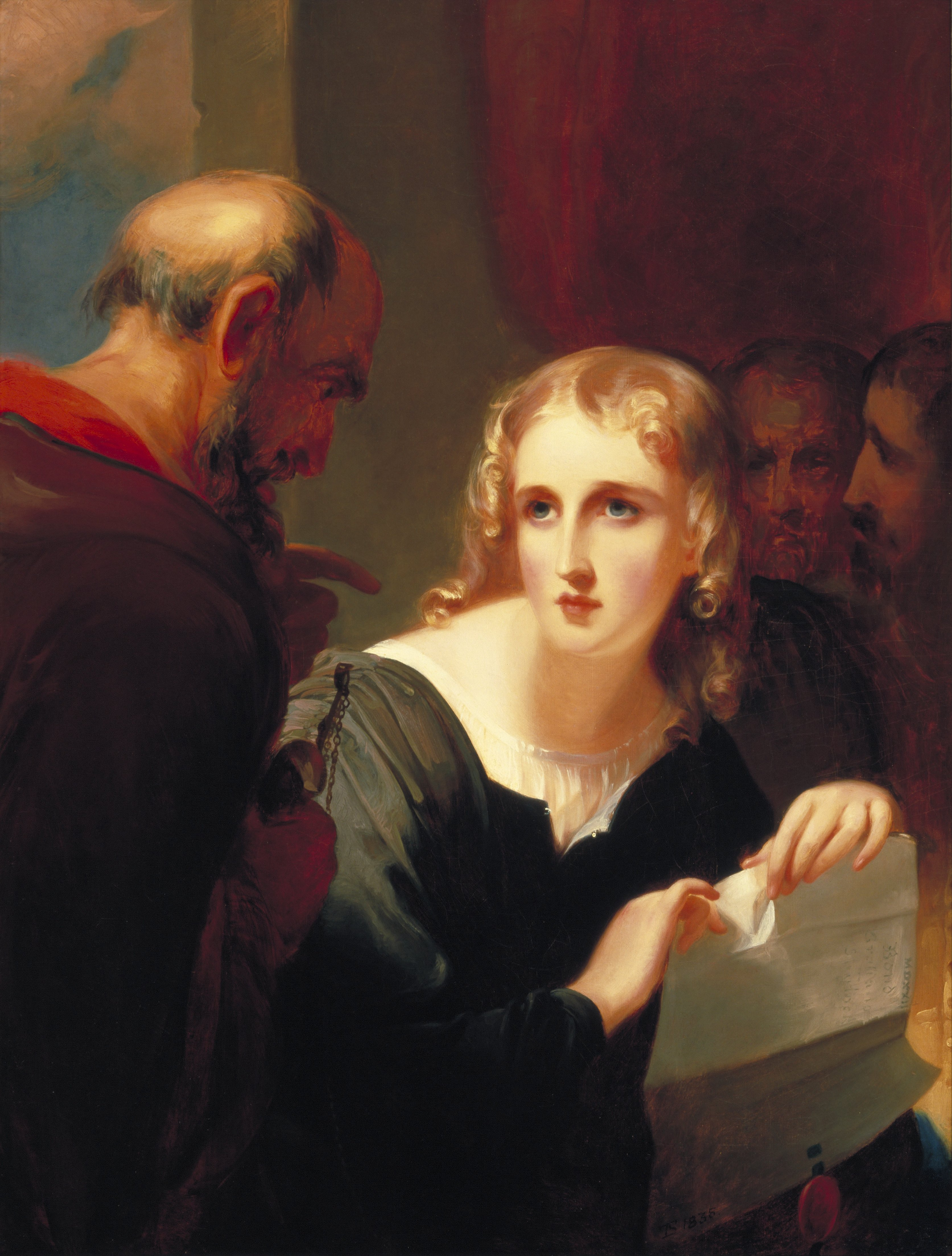
Portia and Shylock, by Thomas Sully

Frances Abington, Sarah Siddons and Elizabeth Whitlock all played Portia in the 18th century when actresses first started appearing on stage in performances of the play. More recently, the role has been depicted in the cinema, on television, and in theatres by a number of notable actresses such as Maggie Smith, Claire Bloom, Sybil Thorndike, Joan Plowright, Caroline John, Lynn Collins, Lily Rabe, and Gemma Jones.

== Cultural references ==
The character of Portia has had a considerable and long-lived cultural impact.

- Abigail Adams adopted the pen name "Portia" in letters to her husband, John Adams, the second president of the United States. John signed his letters with "Lysander".
- The New England School of Law was originally known as the Portia Law School when it was established in 1908 as a women-only law school and was known by that name until 1969.
- In his Rumpole novels, author John Mortimer has Rumpole call Phyllida Erskine-Brown (née Trant) the "Portia of our Chambers".
- Georgina Weldon, the celebrated Victorian litigant and amateur soprano, was referred to as the "Portia of the Law Courts".
- Portia is a moon of Uranus, one of several such named after Shakespearean characters.
- Portia de Rossi (born Amanda Lee Rogers), married to Ellen DeGeneres, adopted the name Portia to reinvent herself after becoming a model and actress.
- The Portia Hypothesis, which states women with masculine-sounding names tend to be more successful in a legal profession than otherwise identical counterparts, is named after the character.
- Portia (given name), the history and usage of the given name

== Sources ==
- Delistraty, Cody (30 July 2014). "Who Wins in the Name Game?". The Atlantic.
- Shakespeare, William (2011). "The Merchant of Venice". In Drakakis, John (ed.). The Arden Shakespeare, third series. Bloomsbury Publishing. doi:10.5040/9781408160398.00000006. ISBN 9781903436813.
- Hicks, Philip (April 2005). "Portia and Marcia: Female Political Identity and the Historical Imagination, 1770–1800". The William and Mary Quarterly. Third Series. 62 (2). Omohundro Institute of Early American History and Culture: 265–294. doi:10.2307/3491602. eISSN 1933-7698. ISSN 0043-5597. JSTOR 3491602.
- Karkoschka, Erich (2001). "Comprehensive Photometry of the Rings and 16 Satellites of Uranus with the Hubble Space Telescope". Icarus. 151 (1). American Astronomical Society: 51–68. Bibcode:2001Icar..151...51K. doi:10.1006/icar.2001.6596. ISSN 0019-1035.
- Kornstein, Daniel J. (1993). "Fie upon Your Law!". Cardozo Studies in Law and Literature. 5 (1, A Symposium Issue on "The Merchant of Venice"). Cardozo School of Law: 35–56. doi:10.2307/743391. ISSN 1043-1500. JSTOR 743391.
- Kort, Michele (29 August 2005). "Portia heart & soul". The Advocate. Here Media. Archived from the original on 26 May 2015.
- Leimberg, Inge (2011). 'What May Words Say ... ?': A Reading of The Merchant of Venice. Fairleigh Dickinson University Press.
- Martin, John (2004). "Weldon [née Thomas], Georgina (1837–1914)". Oxford Dictionary of National Biography (online ed.). Oxford University Press. doi:10.1093/ref:odnb/53148. (Subscription, Wikipedia Library access or UK public library membership required.)
- "Law School History". New England Law.
