= Portia (painting) =

Painting by John Everett Millais

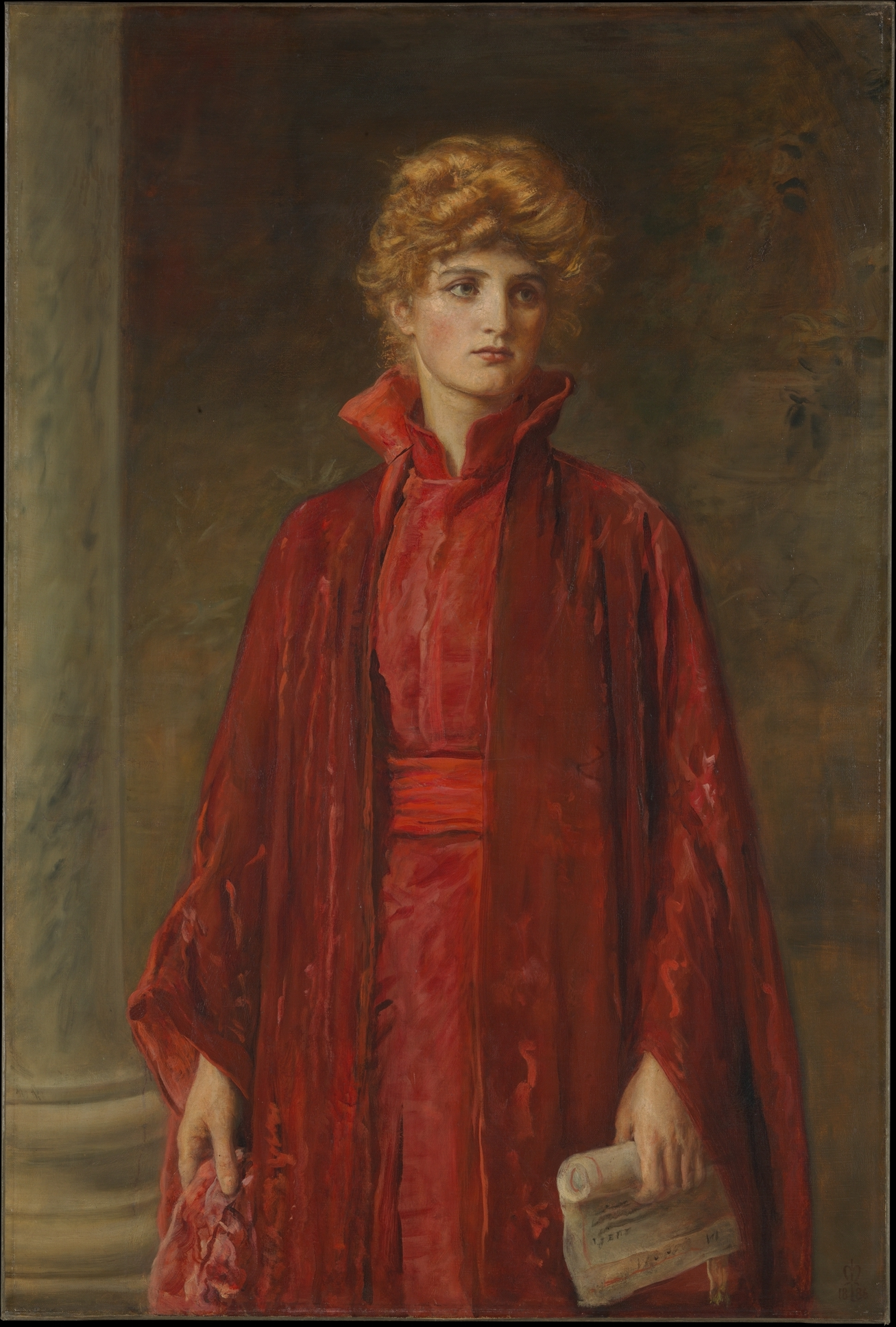
- Artist: John Everett Millais
- Year: 1886
- Type: Oil on canvas, genre painting
- Dimensions: 125.1 cm × 83.8 cm (49.3 in × 33.0 in)
- Location: Metropolitan Museum of Art, New York City

Portia is an 1886 oil painting by the British artist John Everett Millais. Combining portrait and history painting, it depicts the model Kate Dolan in the costume worn by the celebrated stage actress Ellen Terry in her role as Portia in William Shakespeare's Elizabethan era play The Merchant of Venice. For many years the painting was mistakenly believe to feature Terry herself.

Rather than submitting it to the Royal Academy's Summer Exhibition he displayed it at McLean’s Gallery in London the same year. The painting is now in the collection of the Metropolitan Museum of Art in New York, having been acquired in 1906.

== Bibliography ==
- Baetjer, Katharine. British Paintings in the Metropolitan Museum of Art, 1575-1875. Metropolitan Museum of Art, 2009.
- Mahon, Ellen Macleod & Mahon, John W. The Merchant of Venice; Critical Essays. Taylor & Francis, 2013.
