= Guernsey (clothing) =

Knitten woollen sweater worn by seamen

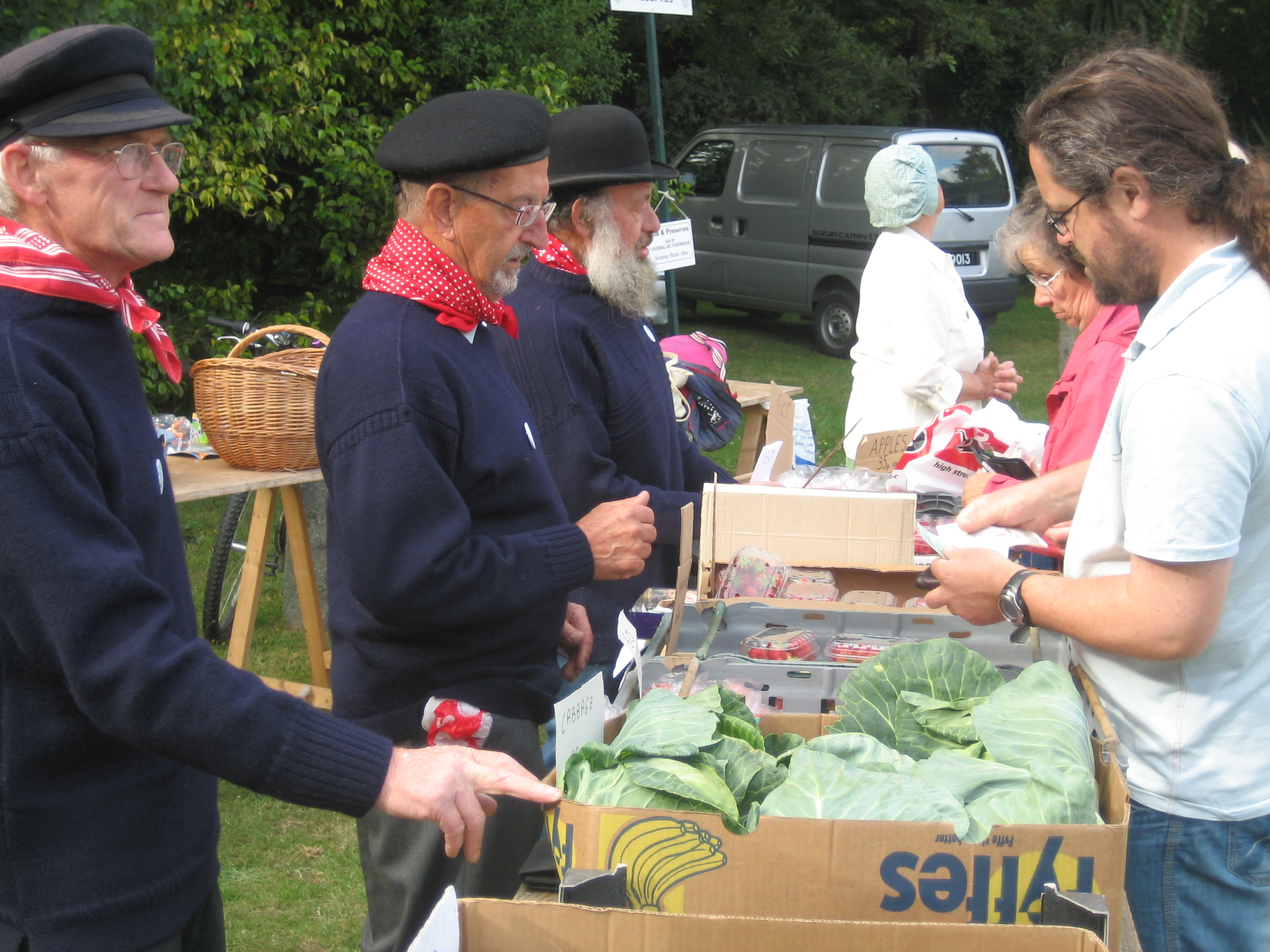
Guernseymen wearing their guernseys at Lé Viaer Marchi (The Old Market), Guernsey

A guernsey, or gansey, is a seaman's knitted woollen sweater, similar to a jersey, which originated in the Channel Island of the same name, sometimes known as a knit-frock in Cornwall, especially Polperro.

== Origins ==
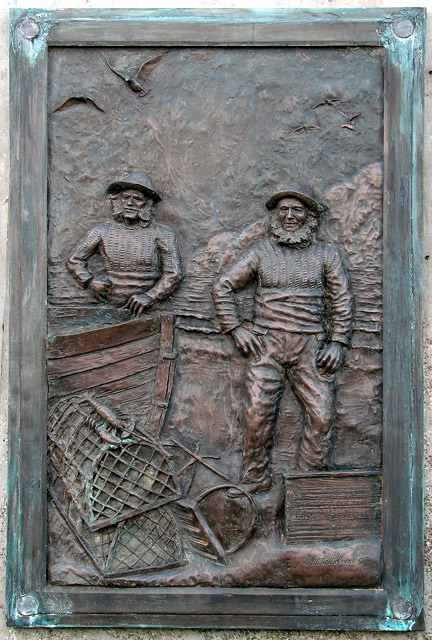
Plaque in Sheringham, Norfolk, showing fishermen Big John Craske and James 'Squinter' West in guernseys

The guernsey is the mainstay of Guernsey's knitting industry which can be dated back to the late 15th century when a royal grant was obtained to import wool from England and re-export knitted goods to Normandy and Spain. Peter Heylin described the manufacture and export of "waste-cotes" during the reign of Charles I. The first use of the name "guernsey" outside of the island is in the 1851 Oxford Dictionary, but the garment was in use in the bailiwick before that.

The guernsey was traditionally knitted by the fishermen's wives and the pattern passed down from mother to daughter through the generations. While commercially available sweaters are machine knit, the final finishing of these machine-knit parts is completed by hand.

Mary Wright argues that the use and wearing of guernseys throughout the British Isles for over a century and a half almost justifies the guernsey for qualification as a national costume. A guernsey from the Folk Museum Guernsey was included in the 2010 BBC project A History of the World in 100 Objects.

The term can also refer to a similarly shaped garment made of woven cloth, also called a Guernsey shirt or smock. There are a number of different names for the same garments, for instance Guernsey frock, Guernsey shirt, smock-frock, or fisherman’s frock. Essentially these are all the same garment, with the materials varying based on the purpose for which it is worn.

== Pattern ==
Two styles of guernsey exist: a plain "working" guernsey and a "finer" example that was generally saved for special occasions and Sunday-best attire. Traditionally, Ganseys were seamless and worked in the round using the circular knitting method.

The "working" guernsey design was kept simpler in order to reduce the amount of time and materials needed to produce. The sale of knitted garments to supplement family income was important to many island families and thus the garments that were sold were also of a simple design. It is estimated that a total of 84 hours was needed to complete a guernsey: a simpler design could be produced faster than a more elaborate one.

Twenty-four principal patterns have been identified in Cornwall alone, each one again drawing inspiration from ropes, chains, waves, nets and sand-prints.

Worn as a source of pride and often knitted by prospective wives "to show the industrious nature of the woman he was about to marry", the "finer" guernsey was more elaborately patterned than its working cousin. With the advent of the machine-knitted guernsey and the decline in the knitting industry, this guernsey is a much rarer sight.

It is not uncommon for a guernsey to last several decades and be passed down in families. Guernseys knitted for children were knitted to be "grown into" and often came down to the knee.

== Use in the British Armed Forces ==
The guernsey was first widely used in the rating uniform of the 19th-century British Royal Navy. It is said that guernseys were worn at the Battle of Trafalgar (although these were probably made from woollen cloth, rather than knitted).

Orders for variants of the guernsey have also come from the Intelligence Corps, the Mercian Regiment, the Tank Regiment and Gurkha Logistics where they form part of officer uniforms.

== Export market ==
Guernseys are still being knitted for local use and export. Japan is at present one of the biggest export markets. In January 2025 NHK (Japan's national TV network) came to Guernsey to make a documentary about the island's famous knitwear.

== Use in other languages ==
The translation for the word "jumper" or "sweater" in the Goidelic languages, Irish, Scottish Gaelic and Manx, are "geansaí", "geansaidh" and "gansee" respectively, all borrowings from the English guernsey/gansey. The Norwegian word "genser" is derived from "guernsey" and means sweater or jumper. In Danish a guernsey is called a "sømandstrøje", meaning a seaman's sweater.

== See also ==
- Guernsey (Australian rules football)
- Jersey (clothing)
