= Guernsey (Australian rules football) =

Shirt for Australian rules football players

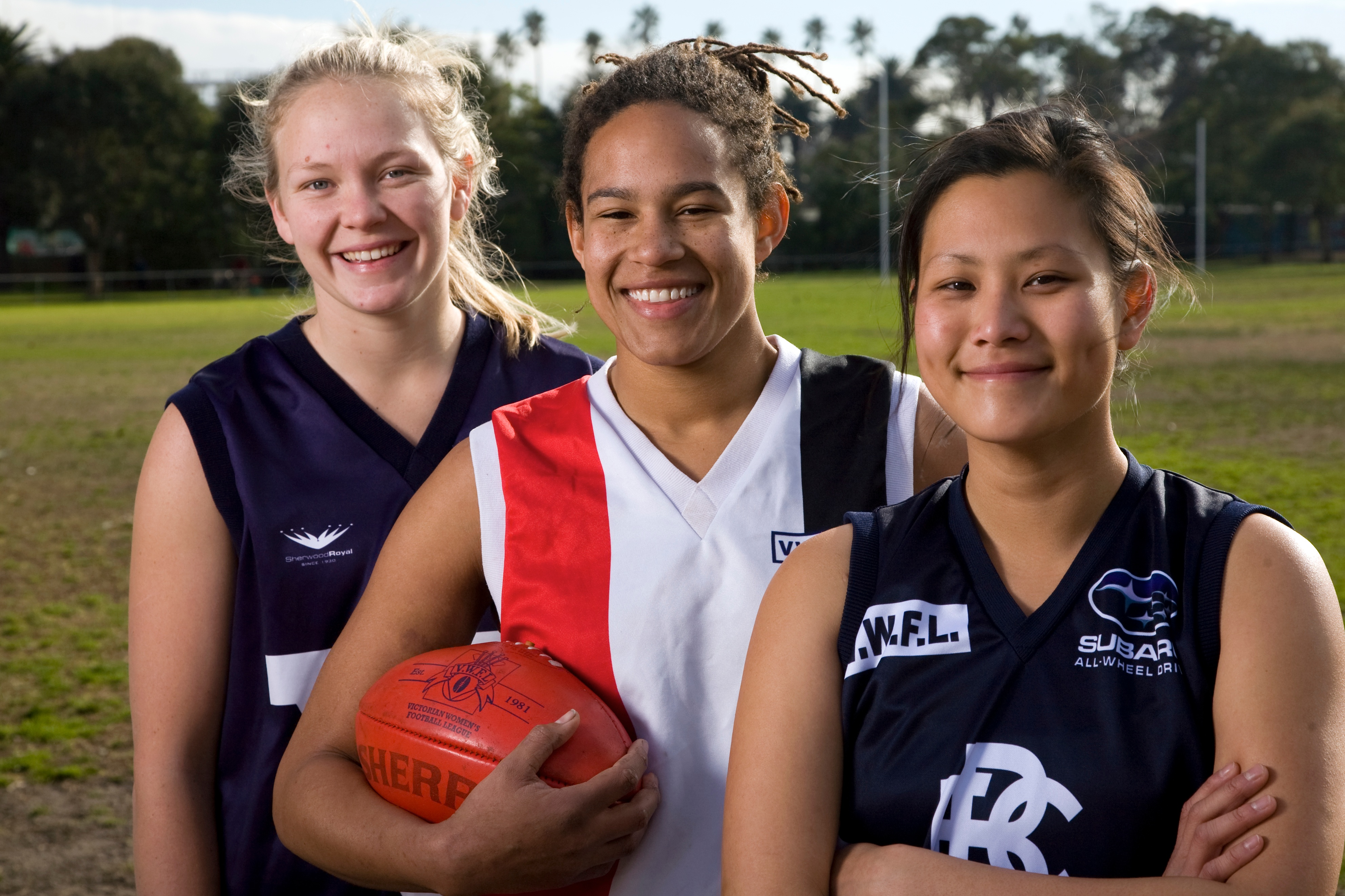
Australian rules footballers wearing guernseys

A guernsey (also called a jumper) is a type of shirt worn by Australian rules footballers. It is typically sleeveless, although long sleeves may also be worn.

The typical guernsey features the player's number on the back, the colours of the player's team, and the team logo. Sponsor logos may also appear on the guernsey. Unlike sports such as soccer and American football, the surnames of Australian rules footballers do not appear on their shirts (with the exception of International Rules football, which is a hybrid code). Australian rules football is unique in referring to the player's shirt as a "guernsey", with most other sports referring to their respective uniforms as a "jersey". As an extension of this tradition, the expression "to get a guernsey" is a metaphor for being selected for something or gaining recognition for an achievement.

== History ==
The first footballers often wore cricket whites during matches with teams distinguished by wearing coloured ribbons and caps. By the 1870s, footballers started to wear more rugged and robust woollen navy jumpers called Guernseys which traced their origins to the Channel Islands off the coast of France. It is from this garment that the modern football guernsey takes its name.

By the 1880s, most footballers were wearing lace-up jerkins made from canvas and leather. A guernsey could be worn underneath the jerkin to provide the player added warmth. By World War 1, the lace up jerkin was dispensed with by most VFL teams, although this form of clothing was used in other leagues such as the SANFL until 2001.

By the 1910s and 1920s, modern knitting and dying techniques had made it easier to produce woollen jumpers in varying patterns and colours. Collars were added to the jumpers and sleeveless options became popular amongst footballers. Although wool had been used as the main fabric of choice, most guernseys were changed to the much cheaper acrylic in the 1980s. In the late 1990s, collars were removed from football guernseys and manufacturers began making the clothing by using modern polyester fabrics using sublimated dying techniques.

During the 1970s, VFL teams began sewing the VFL logo and sponsor logos on their guernseys. Clash and preseason guernseys came into effect during the 1990s due to the growing demand by fans and broadcasters to make football easier to watch by making matches fully “light vs dark” rather than the simple dark shorts vs white shorts.

In 2014, the AFL considered adding names to the guernseys, with Kevin Sheedy claiming it would help fans recognise Greater Western Sydney players, but after trialling the concept in Round 5 decided not to go through with it, despite fans' positive reactions, citing lack of space as a practical limitation.

== Variations ==
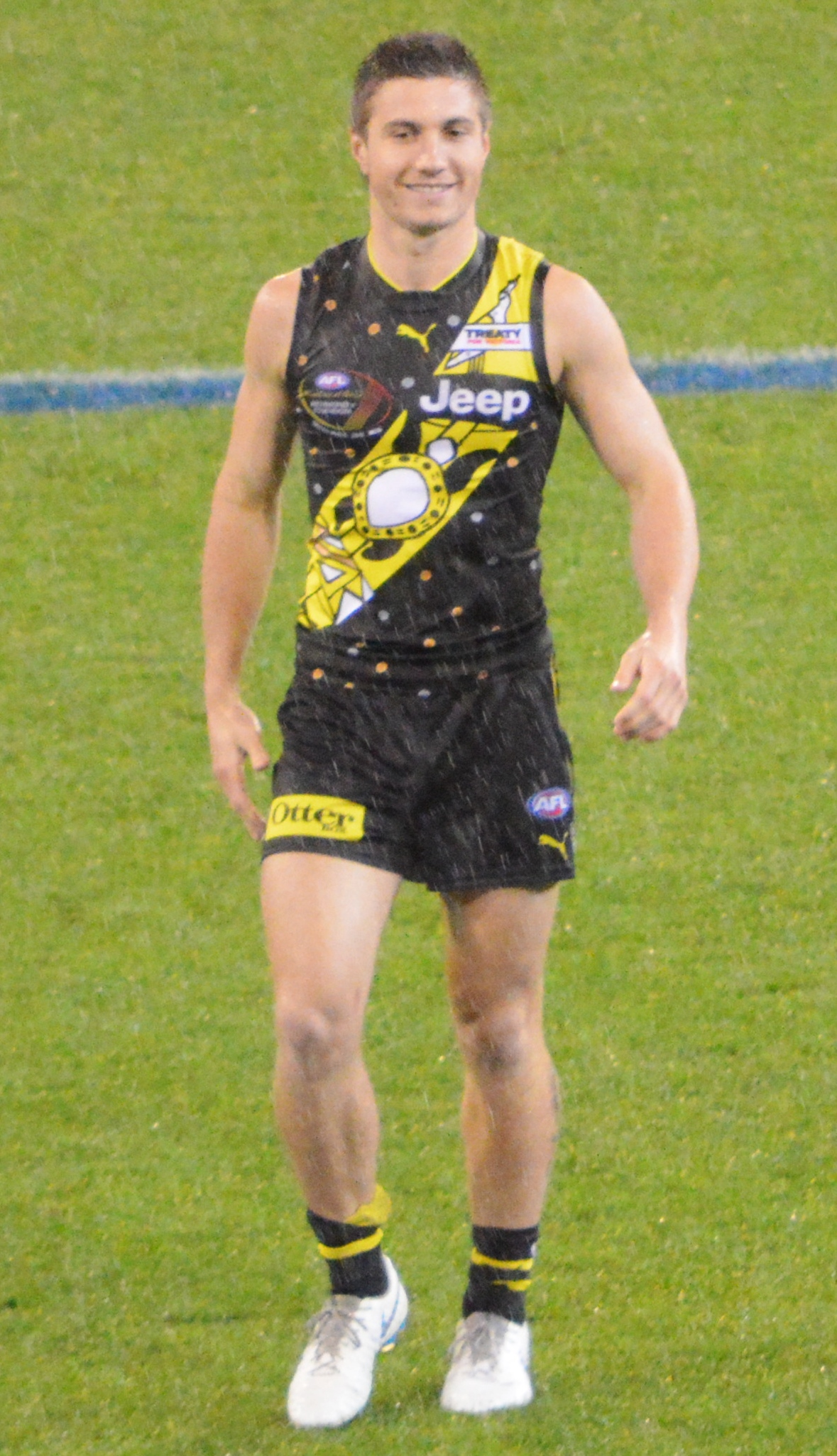
Liam Baker at a Dreamtime at the 'G match in 2019

Most AFL clubs wear a home guernsey for a majority of games (specifically games that are played at their home ground) and a clash guernsey for away games where the team’s guernsey clashes in colour with the other team’s. The most common type of clash guernsey is a colour swap where, for example, a team with white stripes on a mostly black jumper changes to black stripes on a mostly white jumper.

=== Heritage Round ===
From 2003 to 2007, AFL teams wore a heritage guernsey which was a recreation of a guernsey from previous seasons.

=== Indigenous Round/Sir Doug Nicholls Round ===
Every year since 2014, AFL clubs have designed a special guernsey in honour of the annual Indigenous Round/Sir Doug Nicholls Round. These guernseys, worn by every club in the AFL, feature Indigenous-Australian artwork and are sometimes designed by past or even present players of the club.

== See also ==
- Number (sports)#Australian rules football
- Guernsey (clothing)
- Jersey (clothing)
