= Kappōgi =

Type of smock

External image
- Kappōgi worn over kimono

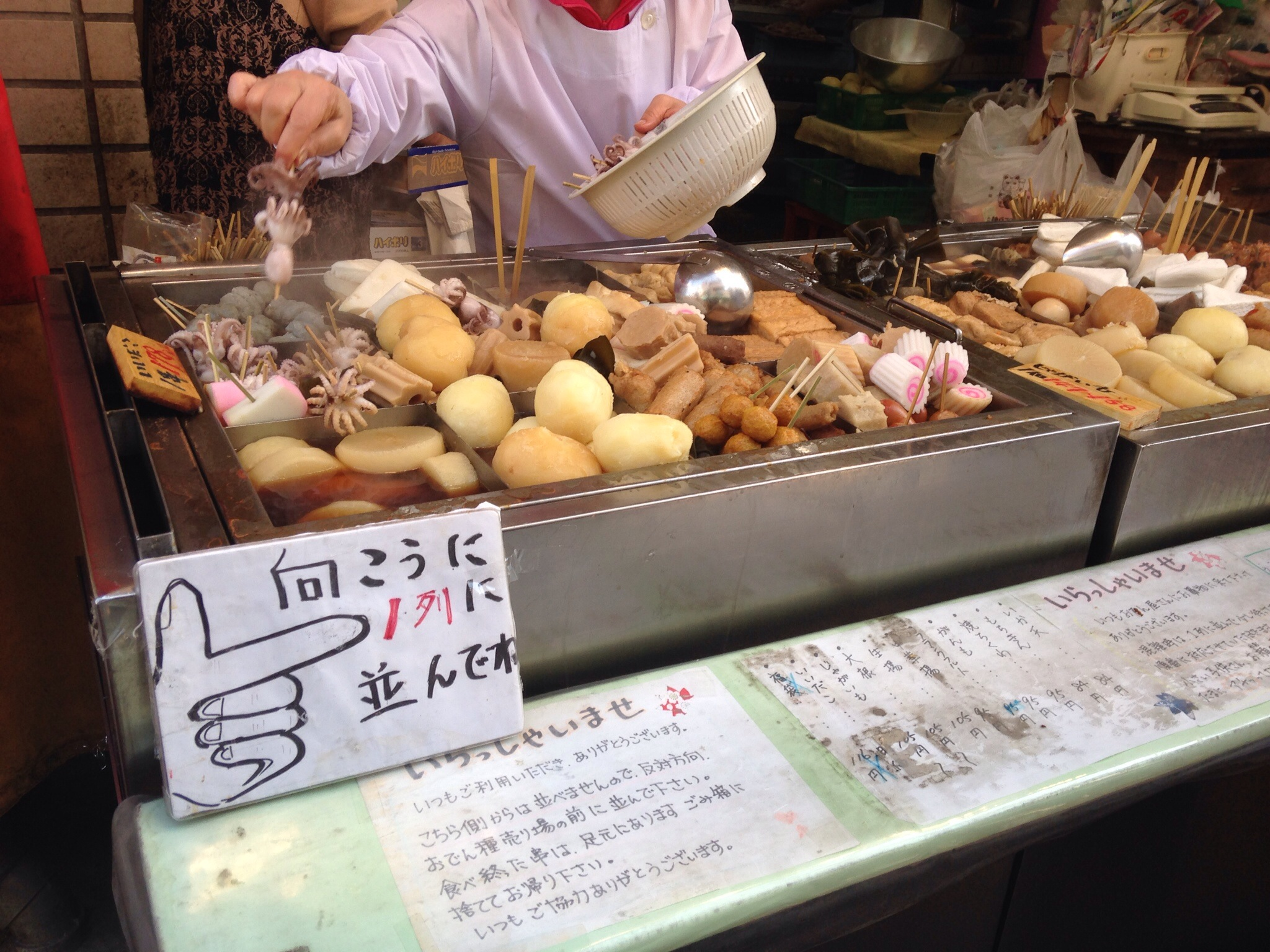
The shopkeeper wears a kappōgi to protect their clothes.

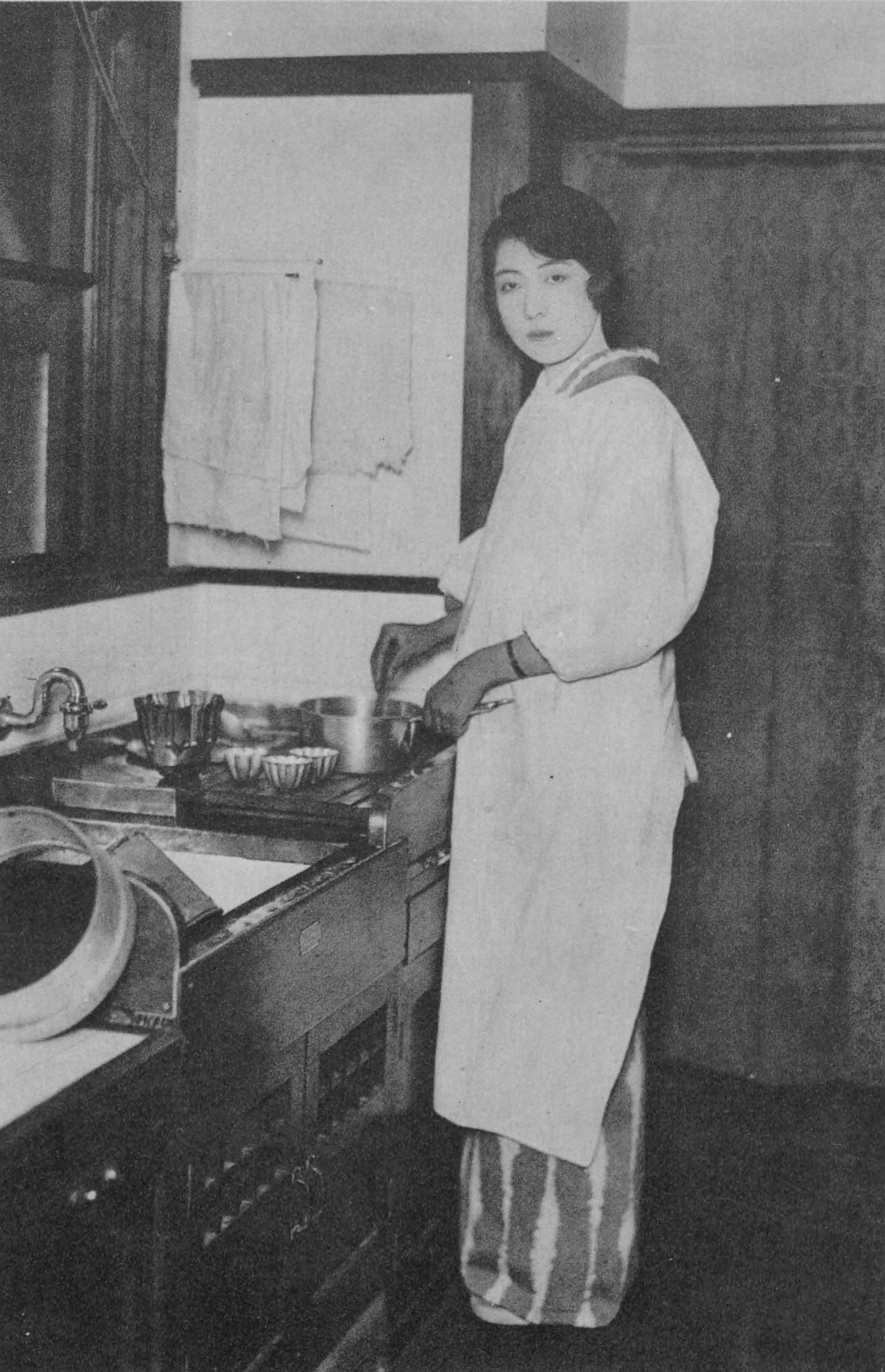
Countess Kiyosu Atsuko wearing a kappōgi in kitchen 1920s

A kappōgi (割烹着, "cooking wear") is a type of smock, originating in Japan. First designed to protect kimono from stains when cooking, it has baggy sleeves with gathered cuffs terminating just after the elbow, and the torso comes down to the wearer's knees. It closes by means of strips of cloth that are tied at the back of the neck and waist. It is particularly used when cooking and cleaning.

The kappōgi was introduced at Japan's first culinary academy, Akahori Kappō School, in 1902, when most people wore kimono on a daily basis.
