= Lèine bhàn =

The lèine bhàn, (meaning 'white shirt' in Scottish Gaelic), was a distinctive smock which transgressors of ecclesiastical law, in Scotland, were at one time obliged to wear in church during public worship on one or more Sundays – also called gùn odhar ('dun gown'), and gùn na h-eaglaise ('church gown').
