= Portia Hypothesis =

The Portia Hypothesis claims women with masculine-sounding names will be more successful in the legal profession than an otherwise identical counterpart. The hypothesis is named after William Shakespeare's character from the Merchant of Venice, who disguises herself as a man so she can argue as a lawyer.

== Evidence ==
A study of South Carolina judges by Bentley Coffey (Clemson University, Department of Economics) and Patrick McLaughlin (George Mason University, Mercatus Center) found evidence supporting the hypothesis.
