= Motherless (painting) =

1895 painting by Walter Langley

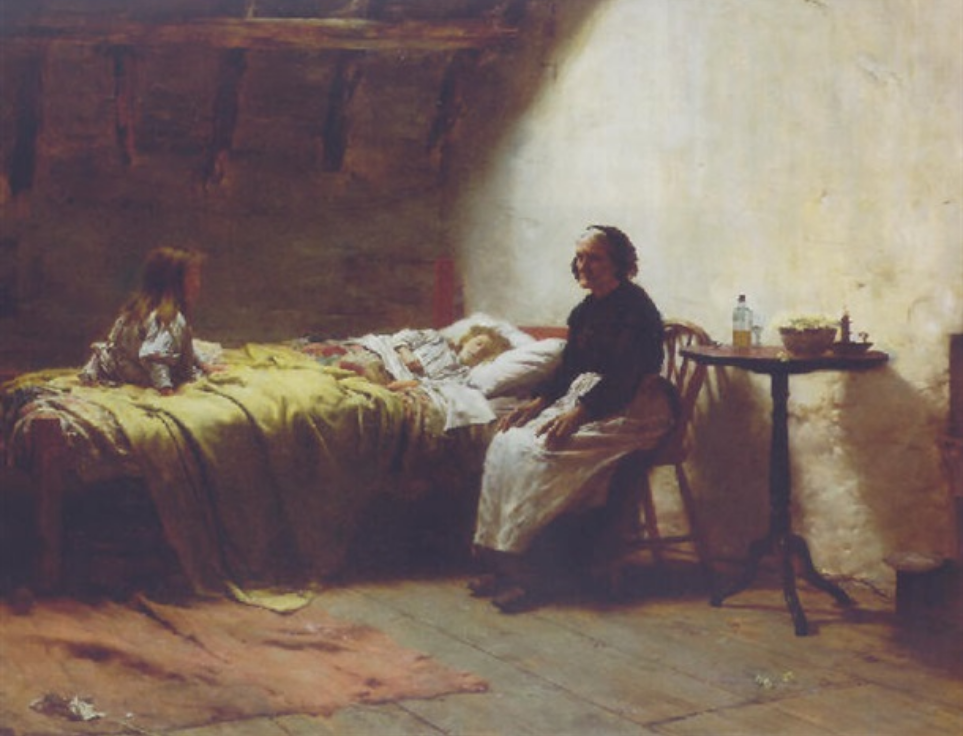
- Artist: Walter Langley
- Completion date: 1895
- Medium: oil on canvas
- Dimensions: 121.9 cm × 153.7 cm (48.0 in × 60.5 in)

Motherless is an 1895 painting by Walter Langley. The painting depicts a child in bed, illuminated by the sunlight. An elderly woman and the child's sister sit nearby. It was painted the same year that Clara, Langley's wife and the mother of his four children died of a stroke.

== The painting ==
Motherless is an 1895 painting by Walter Langley. It was painted the same year that Clara, Langley's wife and the mother of his four children died of a stroke. The painting shows a child in bed, illuminated by the sunlight. An elderly woman and the child's sister sit nearby.

== Critical reception ==
The painting was selected for the Royal Academy's Summer Exhibition in 1894 and hung in Gallery X. It was described in the Summer Exhibition's programme notes as a "grey picture, relieved by yellow blanket and bowl of primroses". The painting was in a private collection as of 2005. A reviewer for The Sketch felt the title was "somewhat sickly" but Langley's painting was superior to another painting of the same title by Frederick D. Wallen. A reviewer for London Society felt it was the "lest offensive" of the "avowedly story pictures" and that the elderly woman's "pathetic expression" was "particularly good". The Art Journal felt that the painting suffered from "a love of mournful subjects" which Langley shared with other Newlyn artists and described the subject as a "golden-haired child sick into death" surrounded by "all the minutely observed paraphernalia of poverty".

It is described as "a very touching scene" in Media History (1998).
