= Warrington Museum & Art Gallery =

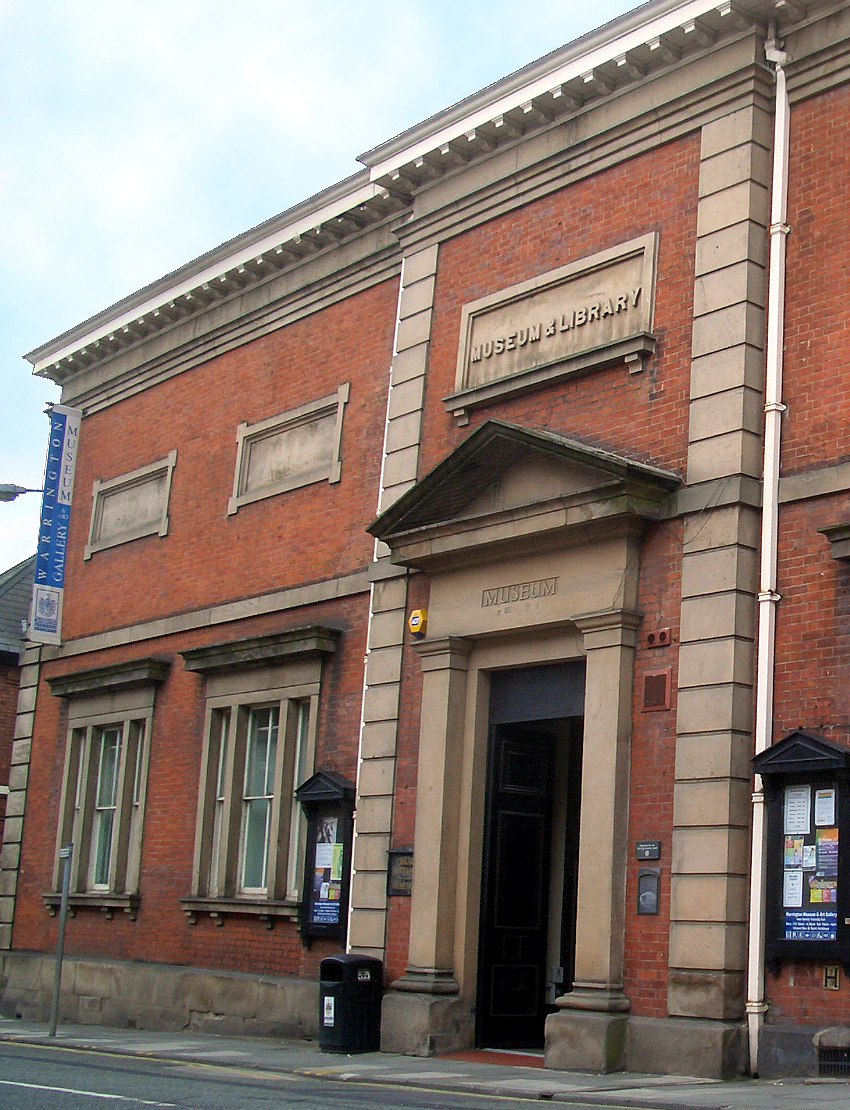
- Entrance to museum

- Location in Cheshire
- 53.3871°N 2.5959°W
- Location: Bold Street, Warrington, Cheshire, England
- OS grid reference: SJ 604 880

History
- Built: 1855–57
- Built for: Warrington Corporation

Site notes
- Architect: John Dobson
- Governing body: Culture Warrington

Listed Building – Grade II
- Designated: 4 April 1975
- Reference no.: 1161270

Warrington Museum & Art Gallery is on Bold Street in the Cultural Quarter of Warrington in a Grade II listed building that it shares with the town's Central Library. The Museum and the Library originally opened in 1848 as the first rate-supported library in the UK, before moving to their current premises in 1858. The art galleries were subsequently added in 1877 and 1931. Operated by Culture Warrington, Warrington Museum and Art Gallery has the distinction of being one of the oldest municipal museums in the UK and much of the quintessential character of the building has been preserved.

== Architecture ==
The museum and art gallery were built between 1855 and 1857 to a design by John Dobson. The building is constructed in brick and stone and is in two storeys. It is recorded in the National Heritage List for England as a Grade II listed building, having been designated on 4 April 1975.

== Collections ==
The museum's collection was originally based upon the collection of the Warrington Natural History Society but it has since grown and now includes a wide range of subjects such as ethnology, egyptology, geology, Roman Britain, pottery/ceramics, botany, fish, amphibians, reptiles, the Civil War, local industries, birds and mammals, and glass. The building also houses a collection of around 1,000 paintings, (oils, watercolours and prints) from the 19th and early 20th centuries, many of which are on display in the mezzanine Art Gallery on the 2nd floor. One of the most famous works in the collection is Between the Tides (1901) by Walter Langley, acquired in 1966. On the first floor there are two temporary galleries, one large and one small, which frequently display travelling exhibitions and the work of local artists and events relating to the community. One exhibit which has received some public attention is the Warrington seal, which was shot in Paddington Lock in 1908, then given to the Museum. In 1999 James Dickinson repaired the mount, giving it new whiskers "rescued from an old tiger".

Since 1885 the museum has been home to the mummy of an Egyptian male teenager.

== Gallery ==
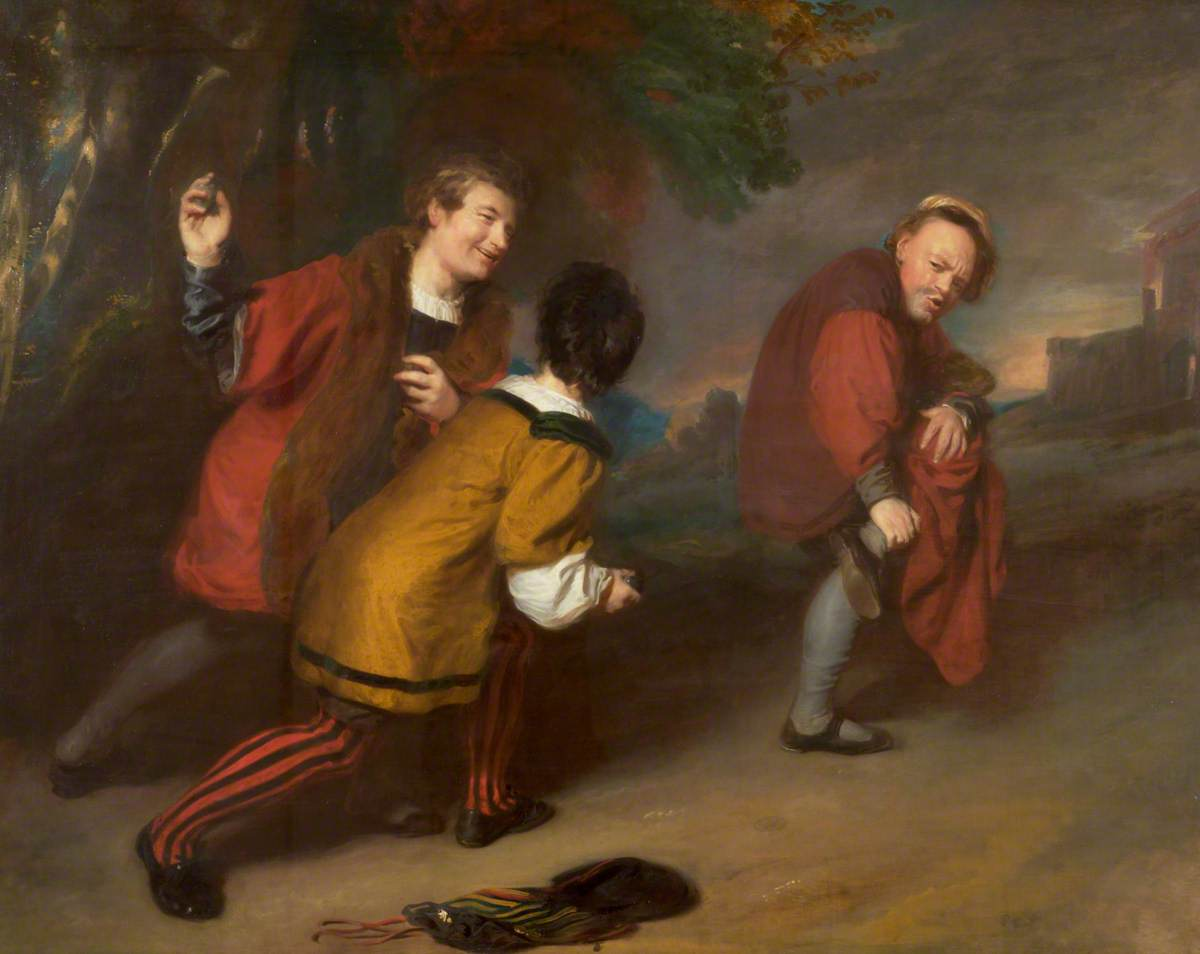
The Search for the Heliotrope by Henry Perronet Briggs, 1819

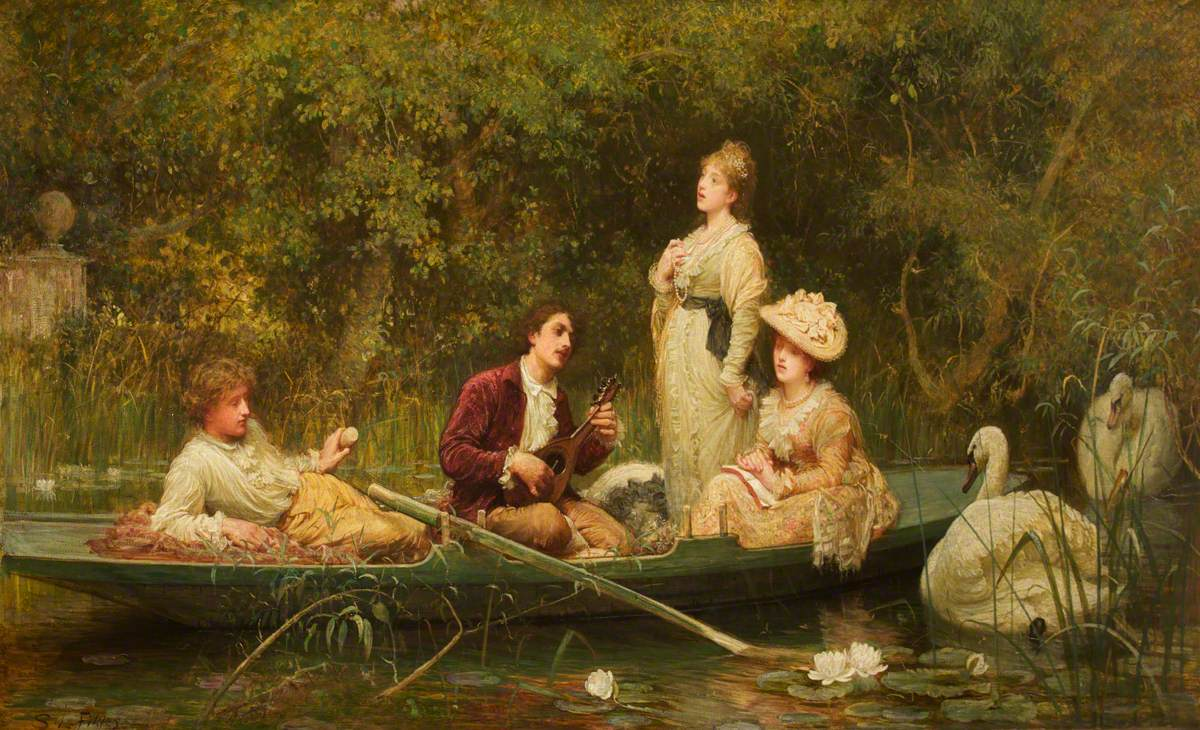
Fair Quiet and Sweet Rest by Luke Fildes, 1872

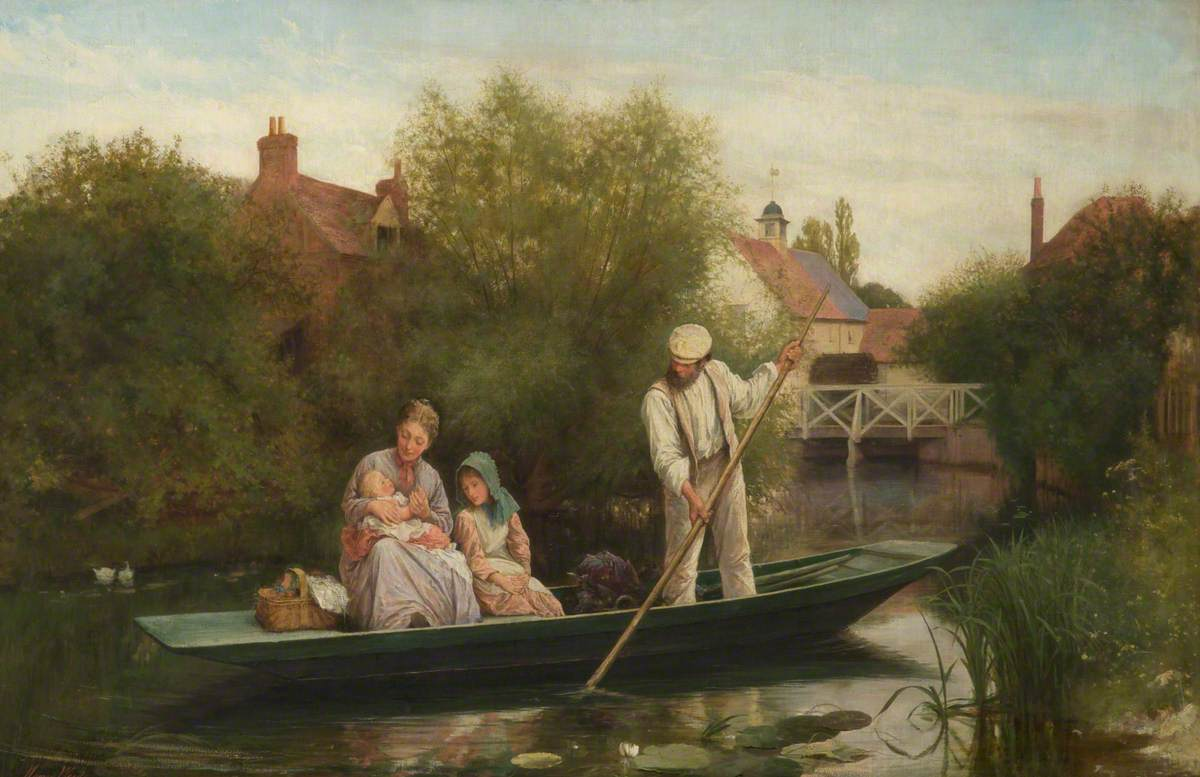
Going Home by Henry Woods, 1873

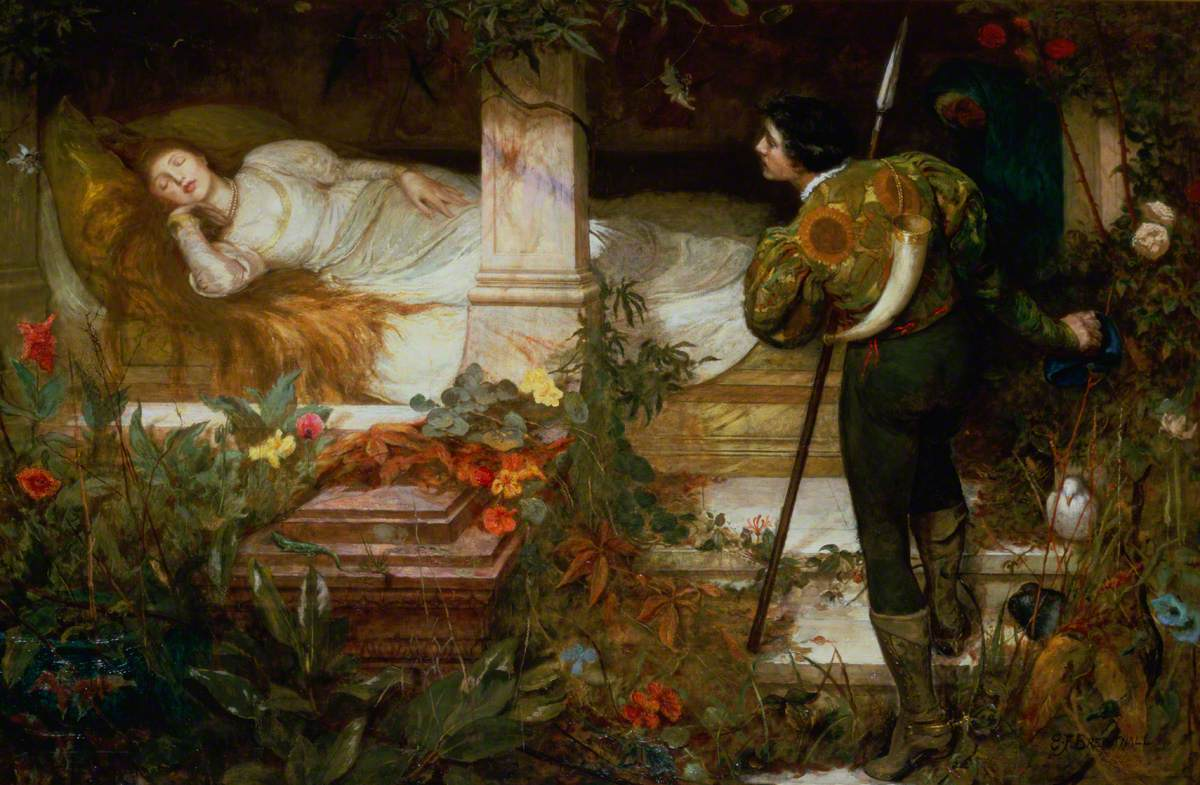
Sleeping Beauty by Edward Frederick Brewtnall, 1877

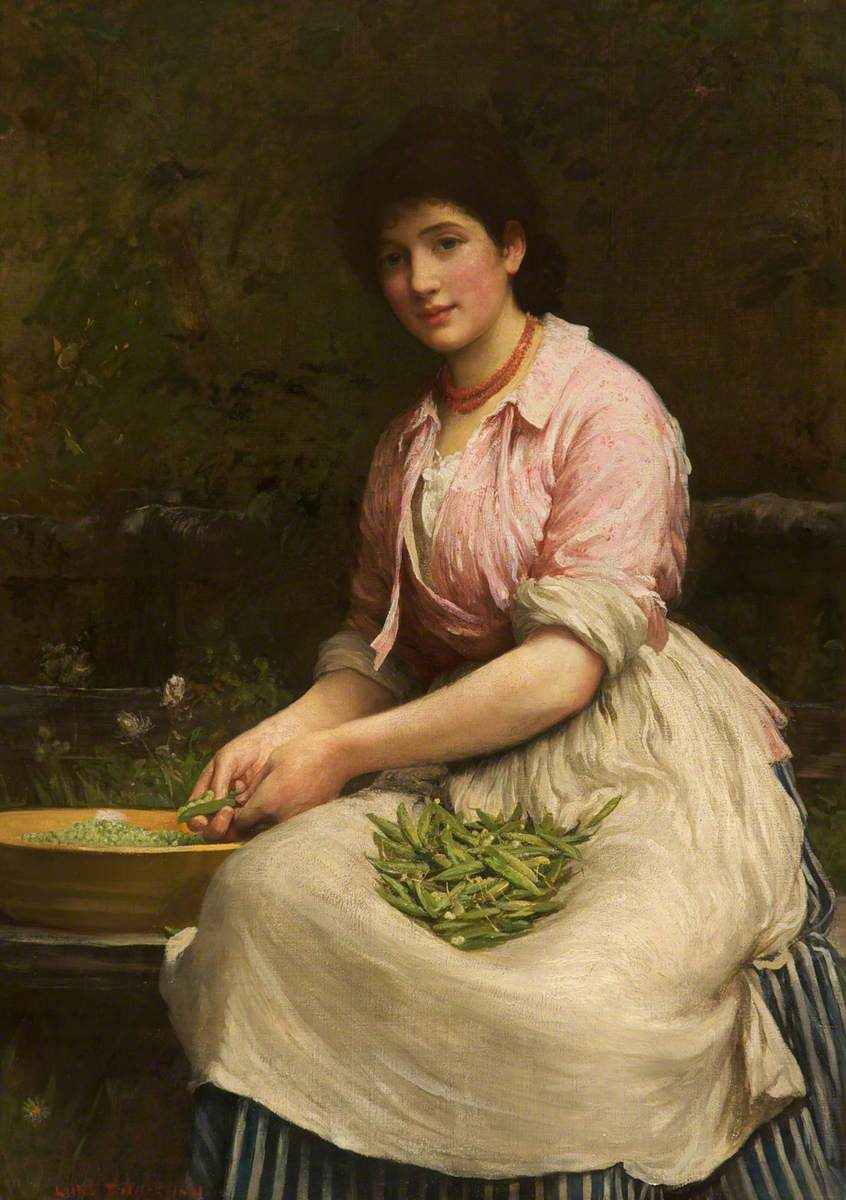
Girl Shelling Peas by Luke Fildes, 1881

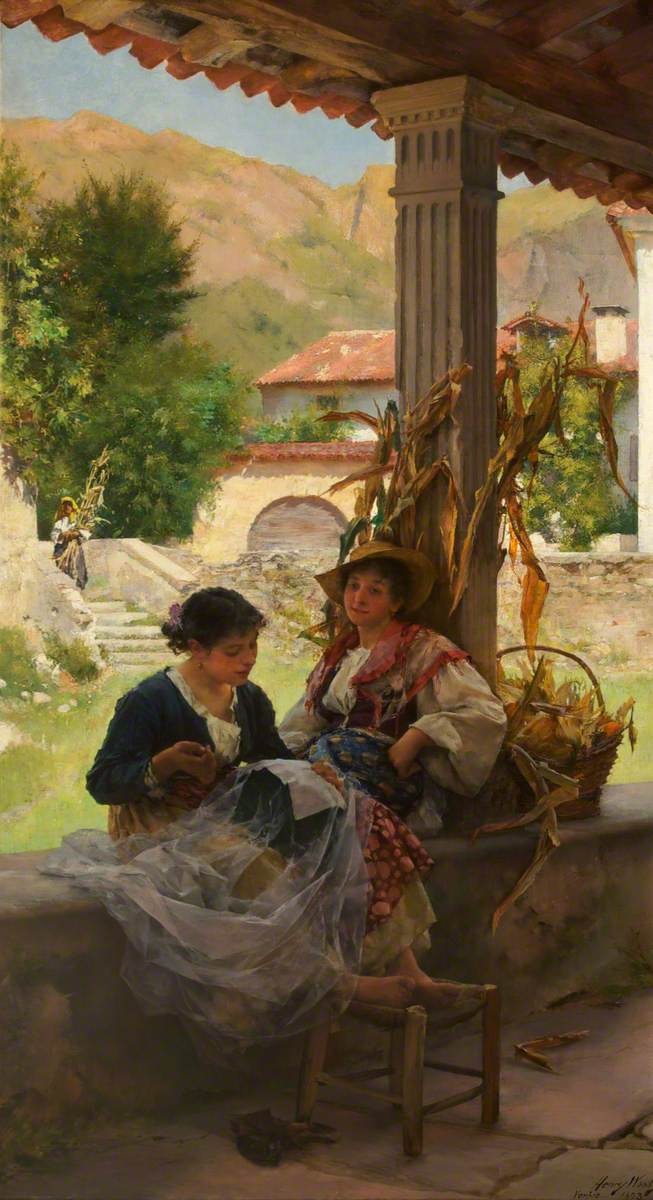
First Communion Veil by Henry Woods, 1893

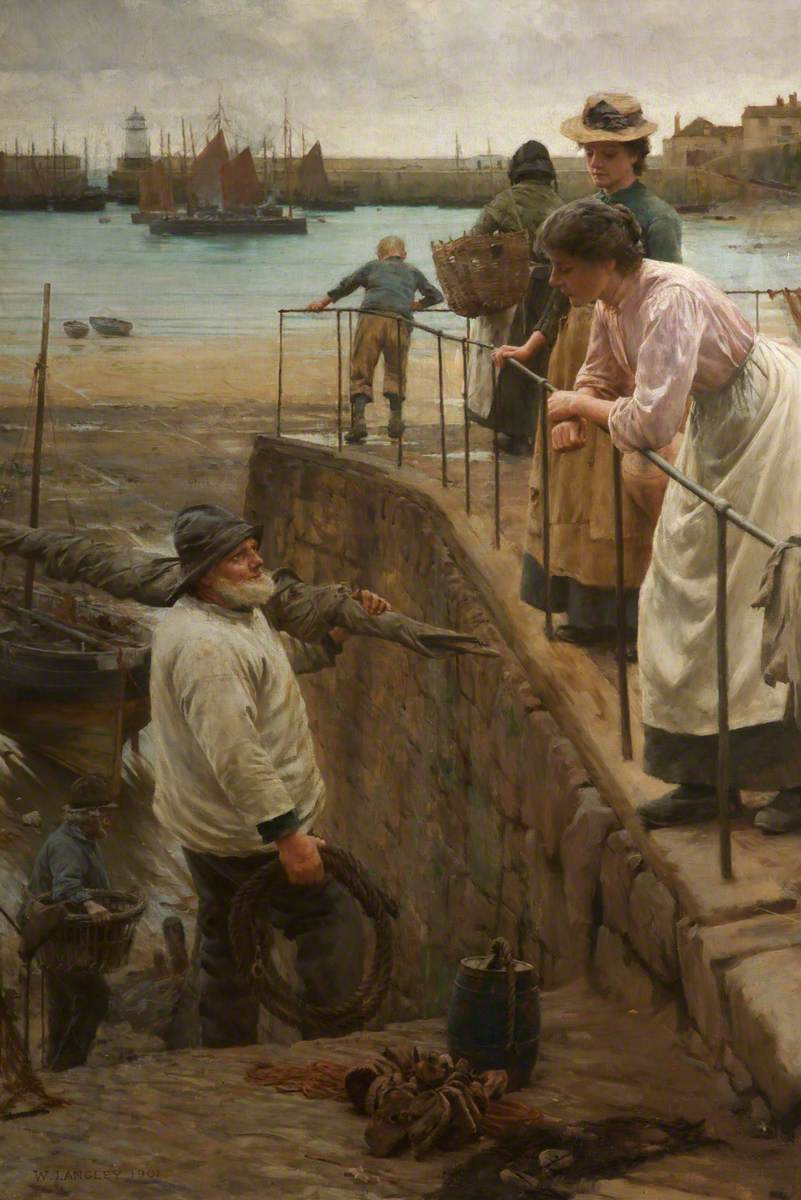
Between the Tides by Walter Langley, 1901

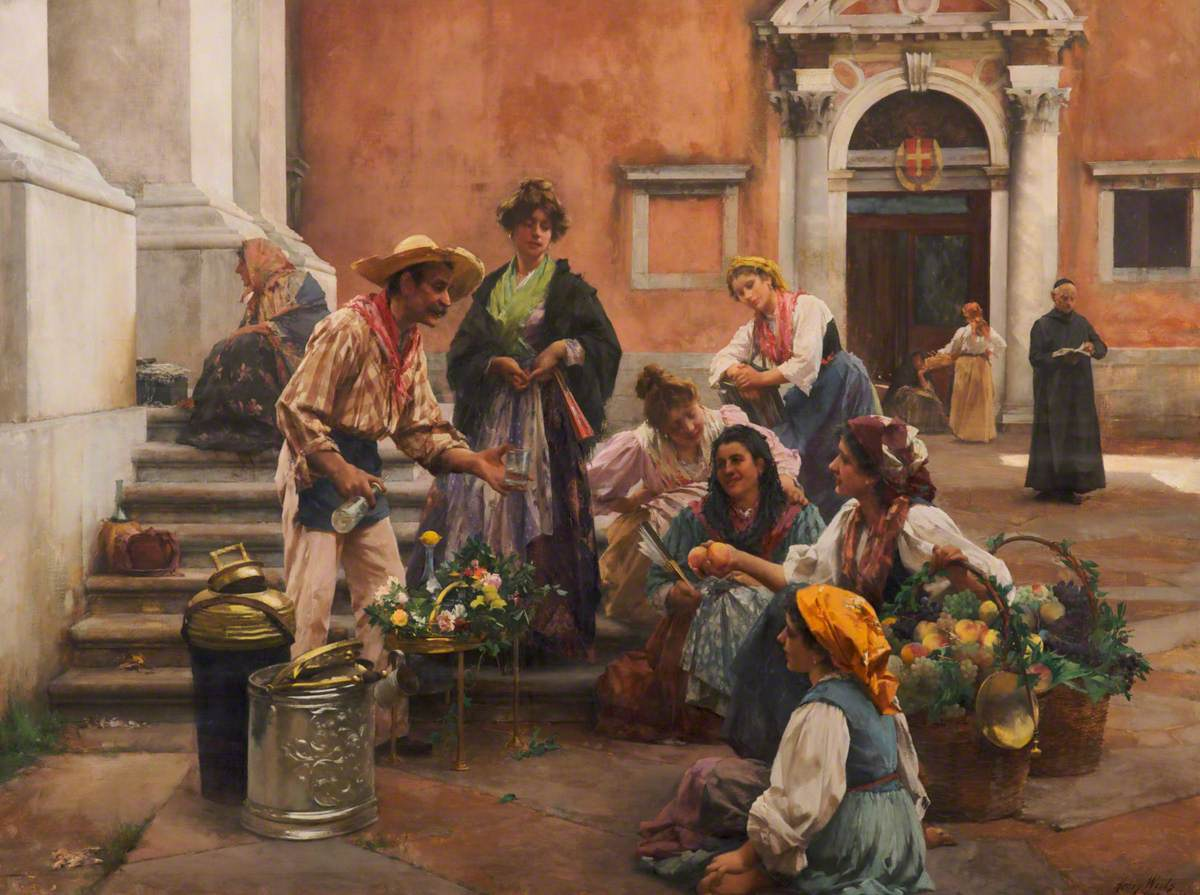
Venetian Water Seller by Henry Woods, 1902

== Notable staff ==
- Arthur Deane, FRSE, Assistant Curator 1901–5

== See also ==
- Listed buildings in Warrington (unparished area)
- List of museums in Cheshire
