= Between the Tides (painting) =

Painting by Walter Langley

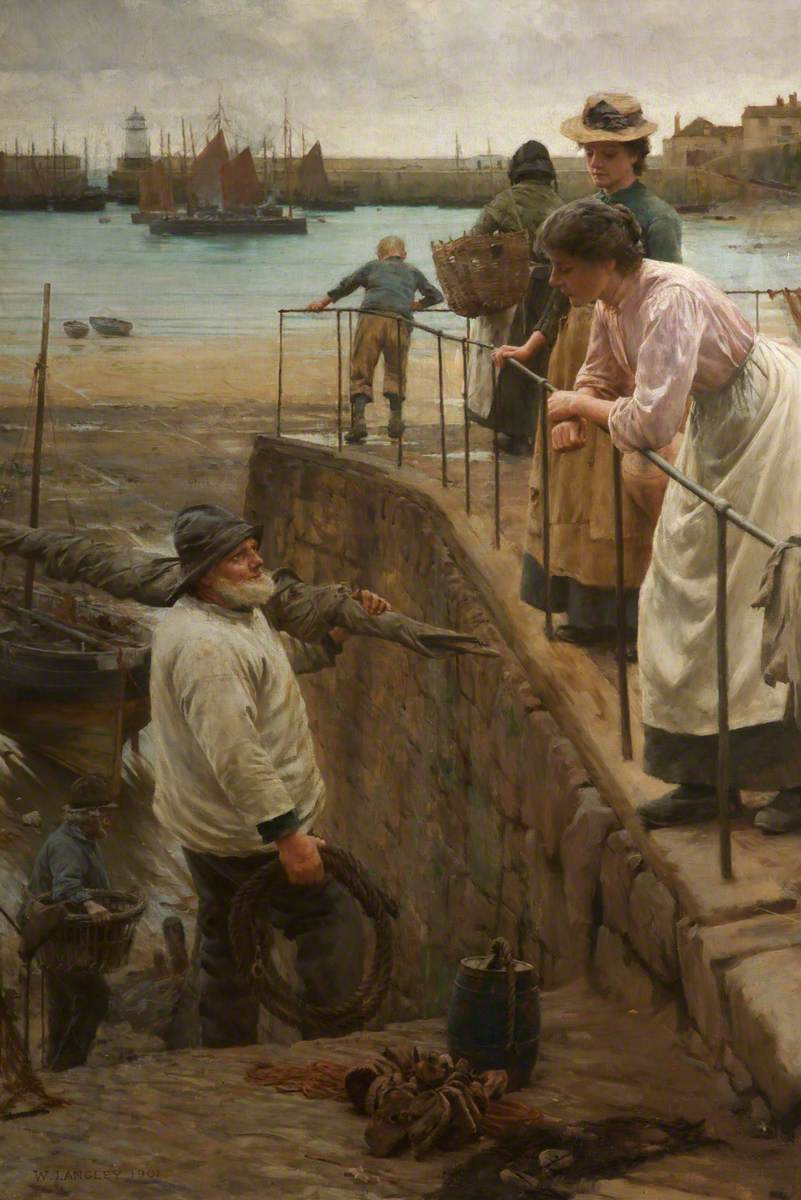
- Artist: Walter Langley
- Year: 1901
- Type: Oil on canvas, genre painting
- Dimensions: 150 cm × 100 cm (59 in × 39 in)
- Location: Museum and Art Gallery, Warrington

Between the Tides is an oil painting on canvas by the British artist Walter Langley, from 1901. It depicts a scene in the harbour at Newlyn in Cornwall.

Langley was a prominent member of the Newlyn School of artists who blended French impressionism with Realist technique in their depictions of coastal life. The picture was displayed at the Royal Academy Exhibition of 1901 held at Burlington House in London. Today it is part of the collection of Warrington Museum and Art Gallery in Cheshire, having been acquired in 1966.

== Bibliography ==
- Gillin, Edward J. Entente Imperial: British and French Power in the Age of Empire. Amberley Publishing, 2022.
- Langley, Roger. Walter Langley: Pioneer of the Newlyn Art Colony. Sansom & Company, 1997.
