= Portia Spennie Blackiston =

American educator

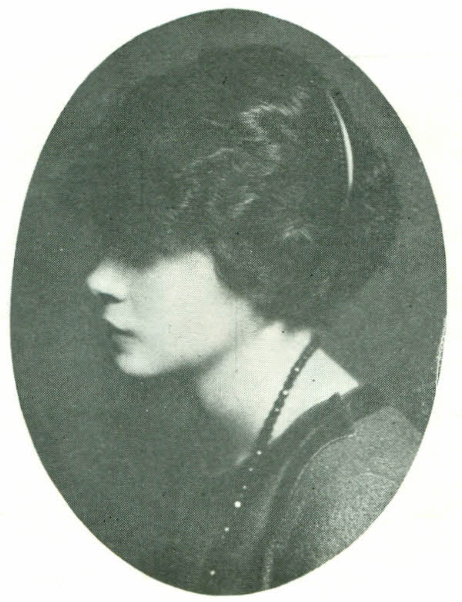
- Portia Spennie Blackiston, from the 1924 yearbook of the West Virginia Collegiate Institute
- Born: Portia Smiley Spennie; October 14, 1898; Virginia, U.S.
- Died: November 2, 1973 (aged 75); Culver City, California, U.S.
- Occupation: Educator

Portia Smiley Spennie Blackiston (October 14, 1898 – November 2, 1973) was an American educator and clubwoman, trained in sewing, dressmaking, and millinery. She taught at West Virginia Collegiate Institute in the 1920s.

== Early life and education ==
Portia Smiley Spennie was born in Virginia, the daughter of Edward H. Spennie and Susan Rix Spennie. Both of her parents attended Hampton Institute, and her father taught carpentry there. She graduated from Hampton Institute in 1918, and completed a two-year course in dressmaking and millinery at Pratt Institute in 1920.

== Career ==
Blackiston taught sewing at Tuskegee Institute, and at a summer teachers' institute in Elizabeth City, North Carolina in 1921. She taught domestic arts, including sewing, at West Virginia Collegiate Institute in the 1920s, with Exie Lee Hampton as one of her colleagues in the home economics department.

In St. Louis, Blackiston was active in clubwork, especially in the Women's Auxiliary of the People's Hospital, and in the Booklovers, one of the city's longest running women's literary clubs. She was secretary of the Booklovers in 1937. In 1955, she hosted a Booklovers meeting to discuss the Aeneid.

== Personal life and legacy ==
Spennie married German and Latin language scholar and World War I veteran Harry Spencer Blackiston in 1923. They had a daughter, also named Portia, and a son, also named Harry. They lived in St. Louis while Harry Sr. was a professor and dean at Harris-Stowe State University there. Her husband died in 1970. She lived with her son and his family in Los Angeles in her last years, and died in 1973, aged 75 years, in Culver City, California.

In 2021, Portia Spennie Blackiston was among the suffragists of color featured in the Champlain Valley Suffrage Centennial Auto Tour, and the tour's accompanying booklet.
