= Herbert Stone =

English footballer

Herbert Henry Stone (born April 1873) was an English footballer. His regular position was at full back. He was born in St Albans, Hertfordshire. He played for Manchester United and Ashton North End.
