= Media History (journal) =

Academic journal

Media History is an academic journal of the history of mass media. It is indexed in America: History and Life, Historical Abstracts, International Bibliography of the Social Sciences, and Scopus, amongst others.
