= Walter Langley =

English painter (1852–1922)

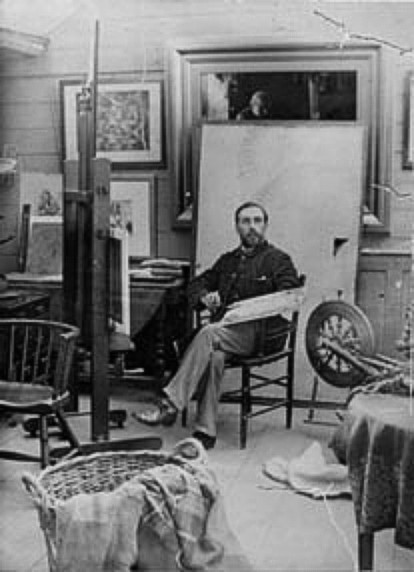
Walter Langley in his studio

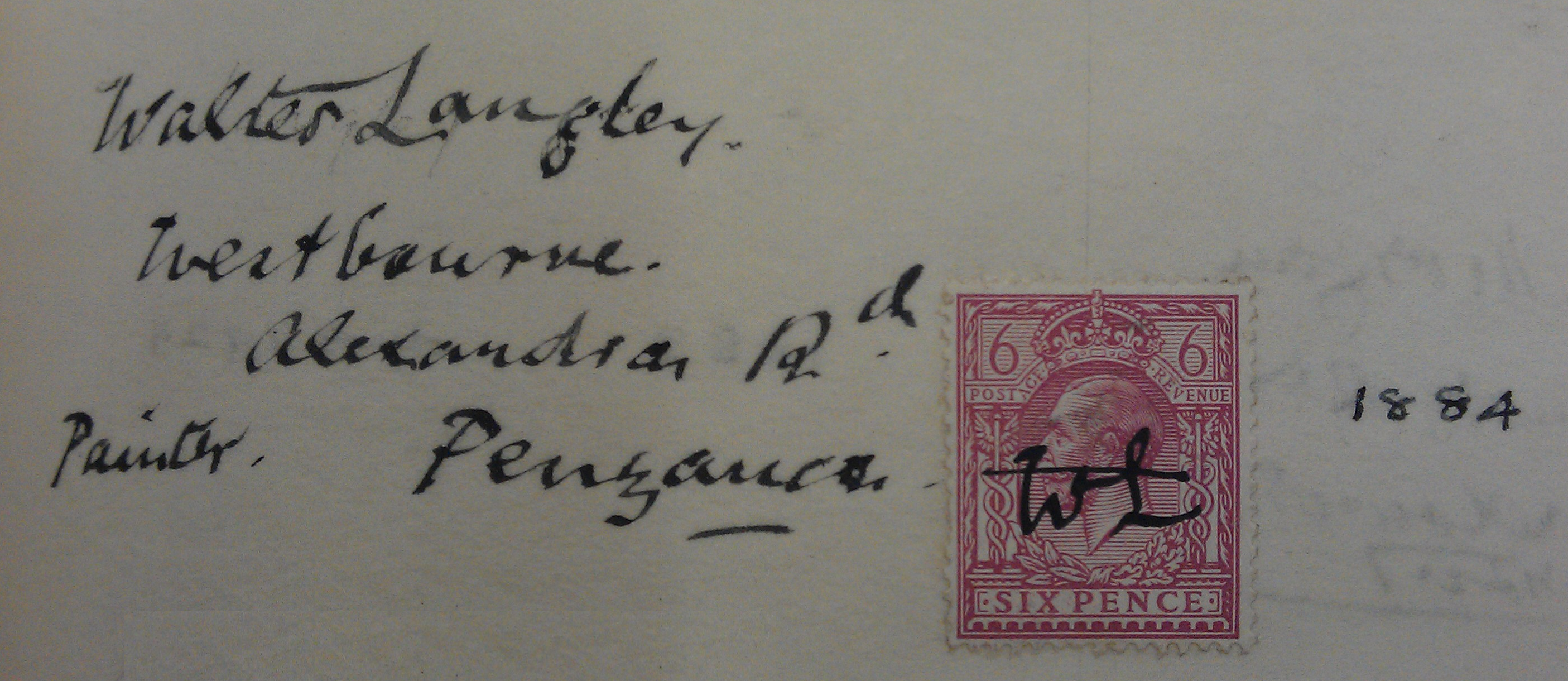
Langley's entry in the Royal Birmingham Society of Artists members' register; in his own hand. Dated 1884 and with an initialled post-1910 postage stamp.

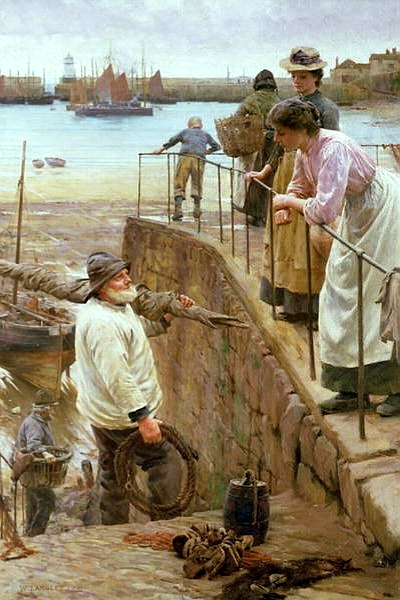
Between the Tides, oil on canvas, 1901

Walter Langley (8 June 1852 – 21 March 1922) was an English painter and founder of the Newlyn School of plein air artists.

== Biography ==
He was born in Birmingham and his father was a journeyman tailor. At 15 he was apprenticed to a lithographer. At 21 he won a scholarship to South Kensington and he studied designing there for two years. The sometimes highly ornate work is mainly in gold and silver and in a Renaissance style. He returned to Birmingham but took up painting full-time, and in 1881 was elected an Associate of the Royal Birmingham Society of Artists (RBSA). In the same year he was offered £500 for a year's work by the Birmingham-based photographer Robert White Thrupp (1821–1907). With this money he and his family moved to Newlyn where he was one of the first artists to settle and began recording the life of the fishing community.

Politically left wing for his era, he was noted for his social realist portrayals of working class figures, particularly fishermen and their families. He was a supporter of Charles Bradlaugh, a radical socialist politician. His own working-class background enabled him to identify with the villagers and the hardships they endured, many of his paintings reflect this sympathy with the working-class fisher-folk amongst whom he lived. One of the best known works is the watercolour For Men Must Work and Women Must Weep (1883; Birmingham Museum and Art Gallery) based on Charles Kingsley's poem The Three Fishers (1851). Another is Between The Tides (1901; Warrington Museum & Art Gallery). News of the Missing was shown at the Royal Academy in 1884 and sold to an unnamed buyer for £250.

Although one of the first to settle in the Newlyn artists' colony Newlyn School, Langley initially benefited little from its growing fame, partly because of his working-class origins and partly because until 1892 he painted largely in watercolour rather than the more prestigious medium of oils. His early training in lithography gives his paintings a detail and texture that show his technical skills. On 12 March 1881 Langley was elected an associate member of the Royal Birmingham Society of Artists.

In 1884, Langley was elected a member of the RBSA and continued to exhibit widely throughout the UK and abroad. Later in his career his reputation grew. Langley's In Faith and Hope the World Will Disagree was singled out as "a beautiful and true work of art" by Leo Tolstoy in his book What is Art?, while in 1895 Langley was invited by the Uffizi to contribute a self-portrait to hang alongside those of Raphael, Rubens and Rembrandt in their collection of portraits of great artists. Today his work is considered "vital to the image of the Newlyn School" and "alongside Stanhope Forbes ... the most consistent in style and substantial in output."

Langley's Motherless was selected for the Royal Academy's Summer Exhibition in 1894 and well received. It was painted the same year that Langely's wife, Clara, and the mother of his four children, died of a stroke.
