= Blackiston Mill, Indiana =

Unincorporated community in Indiana, U.S.

Coordinates: 38°20′08″N 85°47′53″W

Blackiston Mill is an unincorporated community located in Floyd County, Indiana, at latitude 38.336 and longitude -85.798. The elevation is 446 feet (136 m).

B. F. Blackiston once owned a mill in the community.
