= Exie Lee Hampton =

American educator, community leader and clubwoman (1893–1979)

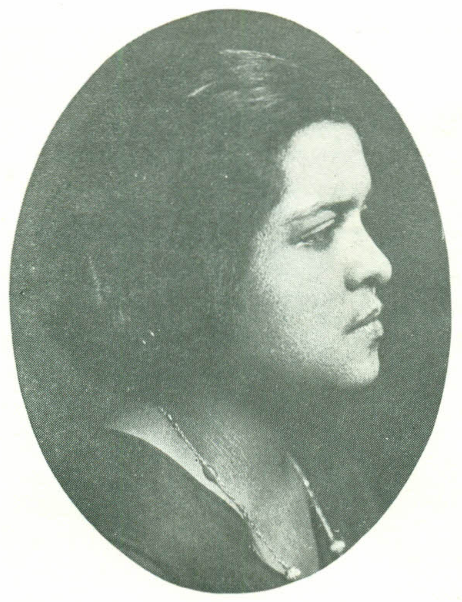
- Exie Lee Hampton, from the 1924 yearbook of West Virginia Institute
- Born: Exie Lee Kelley; 1893; Boone County, Missouri
- Died: 1979 (aged 85–86); San Diego, California
- Occupations: educator, community leader
- Years active: 1921–1967

Exie Lee Hampton (1893–1979), born Exie Lee Kelley, was an American educator, community leader and clubwoman in Southern California. She served on the national board of the YWCA during World War II, and was executive director of the Eastside Settlement House in Los Angeles after the war.

== Early life ==
Exie Lee Kelley (or Kelly) was born in Boone County, Missouri. She attended Lincoln Institute in Jefferson City, Missouri, and Kansas State Agricultural College, earning a bachelor's degree in home economics. She pursued further training in summer sessions at Columbia University and the University of Southern California.

== Career ==
Hampton was a home economics teacher. By 1921, she was a teacher-trainer at West Virginia State College, at Wilberforce University, and at Branch Normal School in Pine Bluff, Arkansas. She taught for five years at East Side High School in El Centro, California.

In the early 1930s, she became executive director of the Clay Street Clubs, which she developed with others into the Clay Avenue YWCA, a branch that served African-American girls and women in San Diego's Logan Heights neighborhood. She left the San Diego work to join the national board of the YWCA, in the USO division, during World War II. She was also active in the San Diego chapter of the NAACP.

In 1946, she became executive director of the Eastside Settlement House in Los Angeles. In 1961, she was leader of the Victoria Business and Professional Women's Club of Riverside, California. She was on the first board of directors of the Inland Area Urban League, when it started in 1966.

Hampton was active in the black sorority Alpha Kappa Alpha for many years. In 1937, she attended and spoke at the western regional conference of the group. In 1950, she chaired the western regional conference.

== Personal life ==
Exie Lee Kelley married a pastor, Charles H. Hampton, in 1929, and as the pastor's wife was active in women's groups in the Baptist churches in El Centro and San Diego. Rev. Hampton was president of the Western Baptist State Convention for over thirty years, before he died in 1979. Exie Lee Hampton also died in 1979, in San Diego, in her eighties.
