= Henry Woods (painter) =

English painter

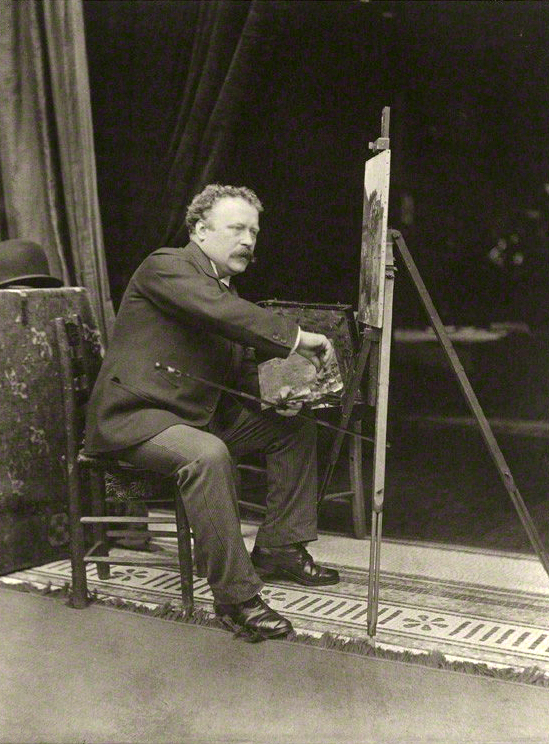
- Henry Woods
- Born: 22 April 1846; Warrington, England
- Died: 27 October 1921 (aged 75); Venice, Italy
- Occupations: Painter, Illustrator

Henry Woods RA (22 April 1846 – 27 October 1921) was a British painter and illustrator, and one of the leading Neo-Venetian school artists.

== Early life ==
Henry Woods was born to a middle-class family at Warrington. His father, William, was a pawnbroker and for some time a town councillor; his mother, Fanny, a shopkeeper. He was the eldest of nine siblings.

Woods studied at Warrington School where he received a Department of Science and Art bronze medal, and a scholarship to study at South Kensington School of Art, moving to London in 1865 with his fellow art student Luke Fildes: "the two became each other's greatest friend and artistic confidant for life." In 1869 both Woods and Fildes became illustrators for The Graphic newspaper, and became associated with artists John Everett Millais, Hubert von Herkomer and Frank Holl. The same year Woods began exhibiting at Royal Academy exhibitions – his style influenced by Carl van Haanen and Eugene de Blaas – and continued to do so until his death.

By 1871 Woods and Luke Fildes were lodging together in Finsbury, London, and later at 22 King Henry's Road, Haverstock Hill, where each had a studio. Both were part of an outdoor landscape sketching circle that included Marcus Stone and Charles Edward Perugini. In 1874 Woods became brother-in-law to Fildes through the marriage of Fildes to his sister, Fanny, also an artist.

== Venice ==
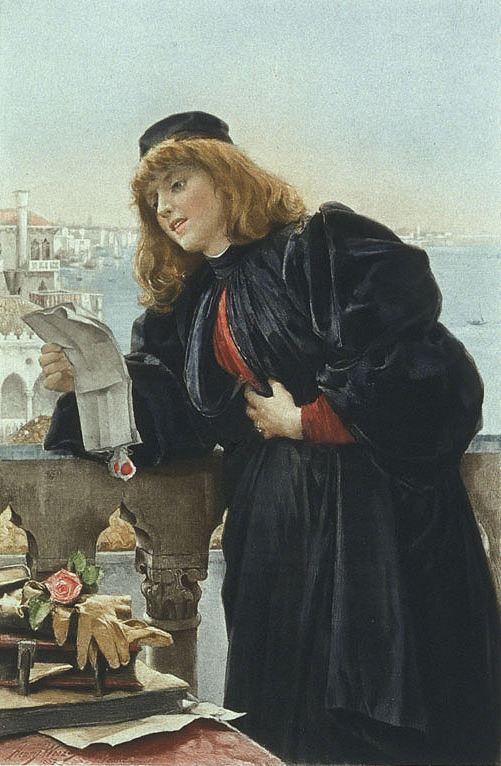
Portia by Henry Woods (1887)

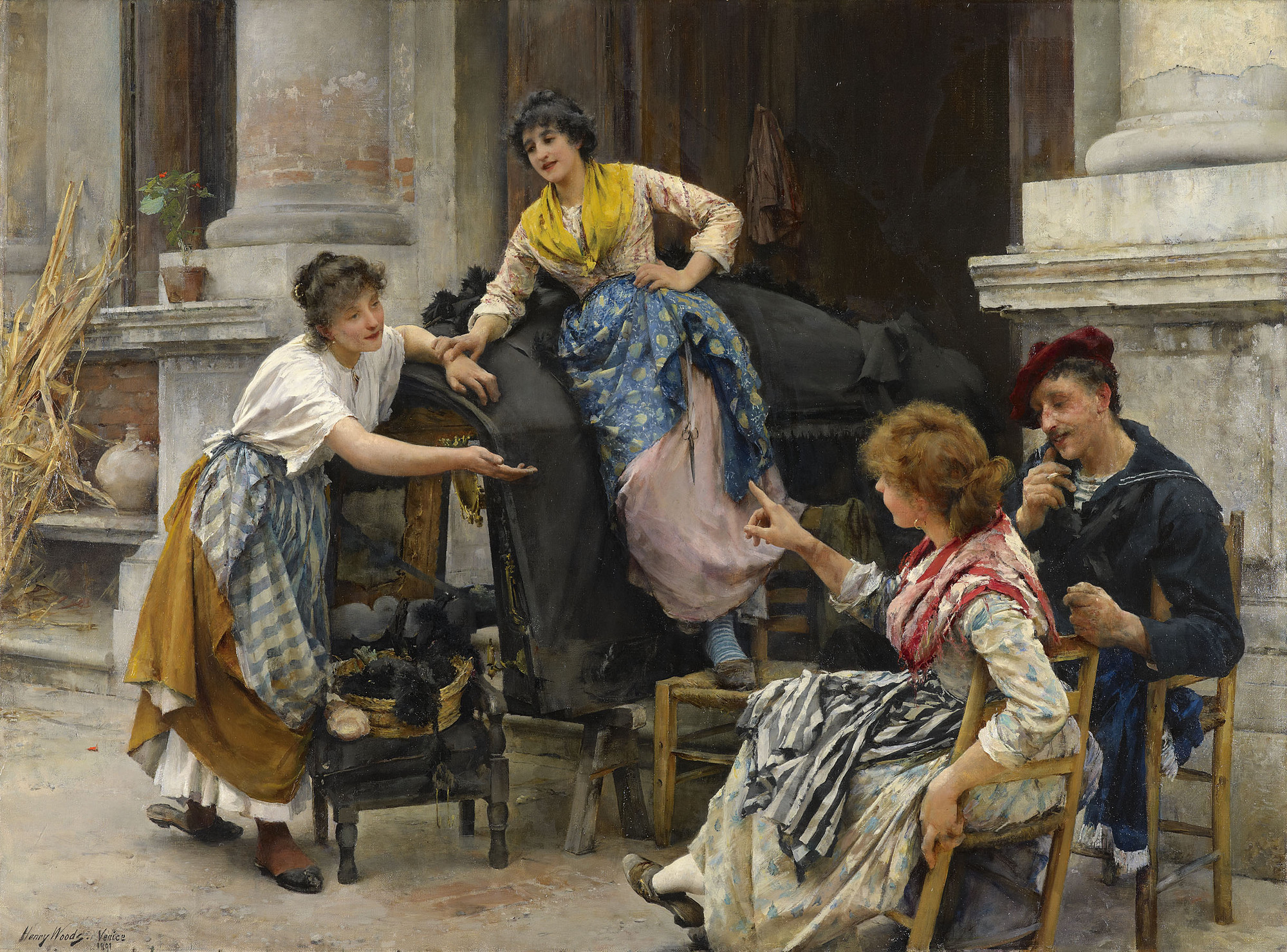
Rivals by Henry Woods (1891), 86.2 cm by 116.5 cm, oil on canvas (Royal Collection)

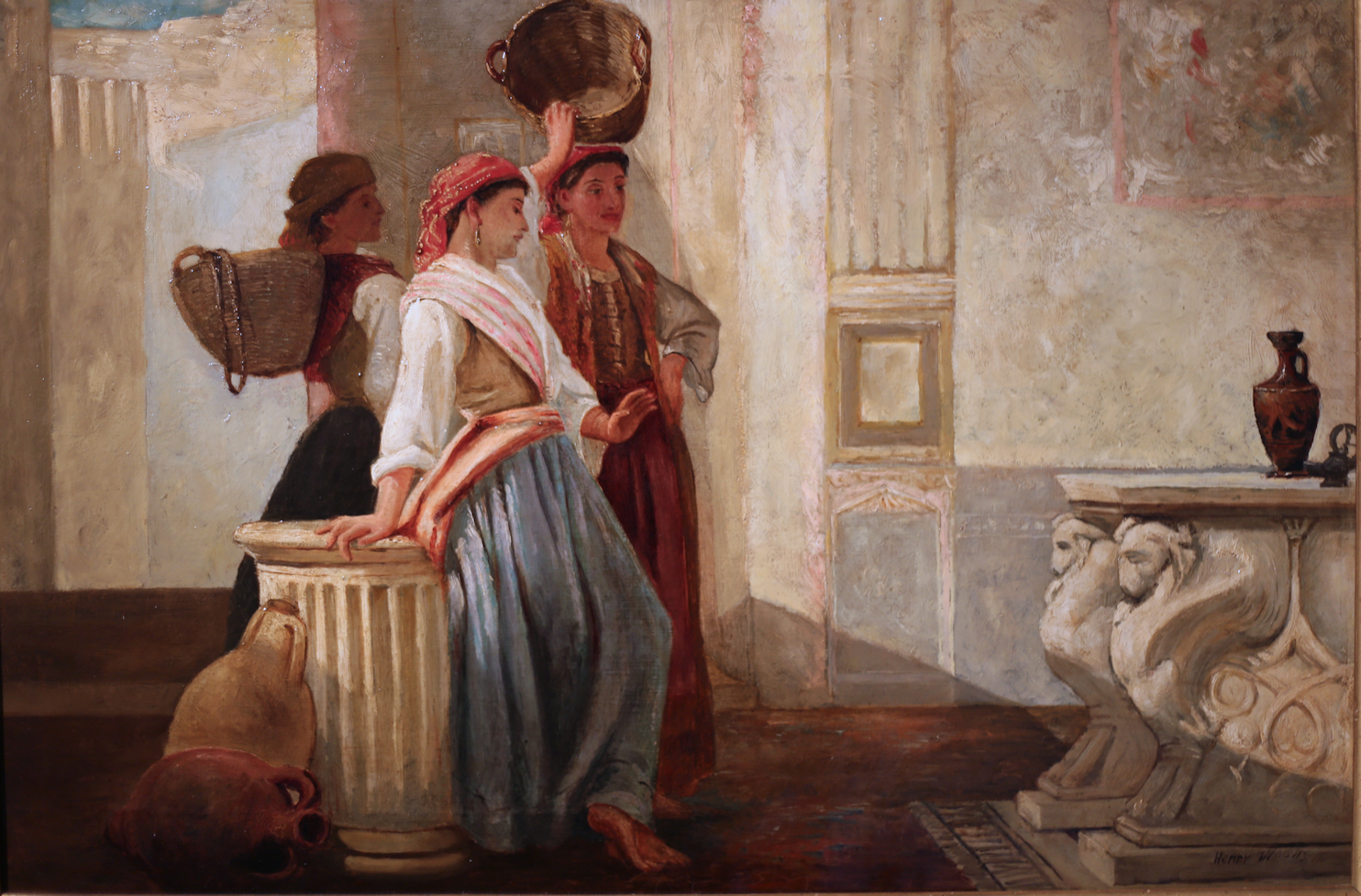
Three Women Contemplating Classical Art by Henry Woods (c.1880), 24 x 61 cm, oil on canvas (Private collection)

Woods first visit to Venice was in 1876, and, despite a few trips back to England, he stayed and worked there from 1878 to the end of his life, portraying everyday life of Venetian people. He became friends with the artist colony of Ludwig Passini, August von Pettenkofen, Cecil van Haanen, Eugene de Blaas, Roussoff, Ruben, and Thoren. He met Whistler in 1879–80, introducing him to Roussoff, and befriended Sargent. In the summer of 1880 he visited England and took up a commission in the Artists' Rifles – he had been a volunteer for some years – practicing maneuvers on Wimbledon Common, and posting guard at Royal Academy banquets.

It was his 1881 Venice paintings At the foot of the Rialto and The Gondolier's Courtship that aided his associate membership of the Royal Academy in 1882; in 1893 he became a full member alongside Henry Moore and John MacWhirter. Before 1882 he had a studio on the Casa Raffaelli, after which he took a larger studio overlooking the Grand Canal, near the church of San Maurizio, while working at the village of Serra Valle during "the full heat of the Venetian summer." One of the visitors to his studio was Empress Frederick, who discussed his Serra Valle paintings favourably. During 1890–92 Woods wrote letters from Venice for publication in The Daily Graphic.

In 1889 a work submitted to the Paris Exposition Universelle won a bronze medal.

Woods was also a member of The Arts Club, and an honorary member of the Accademia di Bella Arte.

== Death ==
Apart from two-and-a-half years prior to 1919, and occasional visits to England to exhibit at the Royal Academy, Woods remained in Venice until the end of his life, latterly at the Calcina Hotel near the Zattere. On 27 October 1921, in the morning, Woods was painting at the Ducal Palace and returned by gondola to the Calcina for lunch. The gondolier returned later and found Woods dead beside his easel. A memorial service was held at San Vio, the English Church, after which he was buried in the Protestant cemetery.

== Collections ==
The works of Henry Woods are held in private and public collections, including those at the Art Gallery of New South Wales, Sydney, the Government Art Collection, London, New York Public Library, the Royal Collection, the Royal Academy of Art, Tate Britain, Tyne and Wear Museums, Newcastle, and the Walker Art Gallery, Liverpool.

== Major works ==
- 1872 — A Monday Popular Concert. New York Public Library
- 1873 — Going Home. Warrington Museum & Art Gallery
- 1878 — A Country Studio. Private collection
- 1878 — Entrance to the Grand Canal. Government Art Collection
- 1879 — The convalescent. Art Gallery of New South Wales
- 1879 — On the Steps of the Rialto, Venice. Private collection
- 1879 — Scene from Victor Hugo's '93. Art Gallery of New South Wales
- 1880 — Street dealers in Venice. Kunsthalle Hamburg
- 1881 — At the foot of the Rialto. Private collection
- 1881 — The Gondolier's Courtship Private collection
- 1882 — A Venetian Fan Seller. Private collection
- 1884 — A rest on the steps, Venice. Private collection
- 1884 — Venetian Cloisters. Private collection
- 1885 — Cupid's Spell. Tate Gallery
- 1886 — A Venetian Canal. Private collection
- 1886 — The Water Wheels at Savassa, Italy. New Walk Museum, Leicester
- 1887 — Portia. Tyne and Wear Museums
- 1890 — A Canal in Venice. Private collection
- 1890 — La Promessa Sposa. Private collection
- 1891 — Rivals. Royal Collection
- 1891 — Street in Venetia. Brighton Museum & Art Gallery
- 1892 — In the Belfry of the Campanile of St. Mark's, Venice. Maas Gallery
- 1892 — The church of the Frari and school of San Rocco, Venice. Private collection
- 1893 — Cloisters, the Church of the Frari, Venice. Warrington Museum & Art Gallery
- 1893 — First Communion Veil. Warrington Museum & Art Gallery
- 1894 — In the Piazza. Private collection
- 1885 — Bartering. Private collection
- 1895 — Il Campo SS Giovanni e Paolo, Venice. Royal Academy of Arts
- 1896 — A Courtyard in Venice. Private collection
- 1896 — A Venetian Christening Party. Towneley Hall Art Gallery
- 1896 — A Street in the Rhone Valley. Private collection
- 1902 — Venetian Water Seller. Warrington Museum & Art Gallery
- 1903 — Fruit sellers from the islands, Venice. Private collection
- 1905 — A Venetian Vintage. Harris Museum and Art Gallery
- 1906 — A Venetian Beauty. Private collection
- 1906 — Rosina. Warrington Museum & Art Gallery
- 1907 — The Admonition. National Museums Liverpool
- 1912 — The Honeymoon. Private collection
- 1914 — Washing Day. Private collection
- 1915 — The Interior of St.Peter Martyr, Murano Venice. Private collection
- 1916 — A Consultation. Private collection
- 1919 — Laundry Girls in Venice. Private collection

== Sources ==
- Fildes, Luke, Val: Luke Fildes R.A.: A Victorian Painter; Michael Joseph, London (1968)
