= Mary Butts =

English modernist writer (1890-1937)

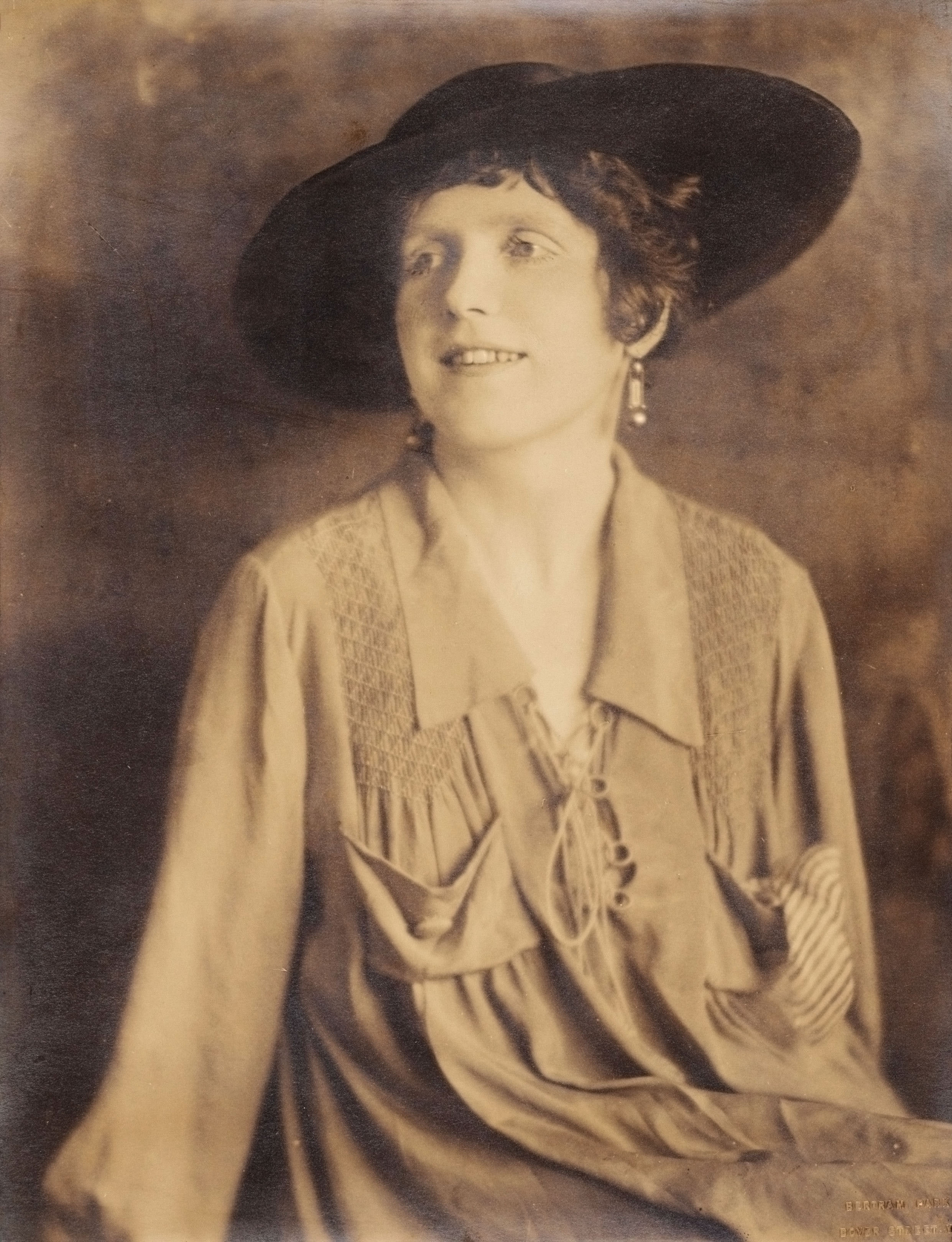
- Photo portrait by Bertram Park, 1919
- Born: Mary Franeis Butts; 13 December 1890; Poole, Dorset, England
- Died: 5 March 1937 (aged 46); Penzance, Cornwall, England
- Occupation: Novelist

Mary Frances Butts (13 December 1890 – 5 March 1937), also Mary Rodker by marriage, was an English modernist writer. Her work found recognition in literary magazines such as The Bookman and The Little Review, as well as from fellow modernists, T. S. Eliot, H.D. and Bryher. After her death, her works fell into obscurity until they began to be republished in the 1980s.

== Life ==
Butts was born on 13 December 1890 in Poole, Dorset, the daughter of Mary Jane (née Briggs) and Captain Frederick John Butts. She had a younger brother, Anthony. In later life she and her brother were estranged. Her great-grandfather was Thomas Butts, the friend of William Blake, the poet and artist. She was brought up at Salterns, an 18th-century house overlooking Poole Harbour (described in her book, The Crystal Cabinet: My Childhood at Salterns), where she became an admirer of the Blake watercolors which her father had inherited. In 1905 her father died; after which she was sent for a boarding school education at St Leonard's school for girls in St Andrews (1905–1908). In 1906 her mother sold the Blake paintings and in 1907 remarried. From 1909 to 1912 Mary studied at Westfield College in London, where she first became aware of her bisexual feelings. She did not complete a degree there, but was sent down for organising a trip to Epsom races. She went on to study at the London School of Economics, from which she graduated in 1914.

She became a student of the occultist Aleister Crowley. She and other students worked with Crowley on his Magick (Book 4) (1912) and were given co-authorship credit.

In 1916, she began keeping the diary which she would maintain until the year of her death.

In the first years of World War I, she was living in London, undertaking social work for the London County Council in Hackney Wick, and in a lesbian relationship. She then met the modernist poet, John Rodker, a pacifist at that time hiding in Dorking with fellow poet and pacifist Robert Trevelyan. In May 1918 she married Rodker, and in November 1920 gave birth to their daughter, Camilla Elizabeth. Butts also adopted Rodker's pacifism. She helped Rodker to set up as a publisher, and through him she met several modernist writers, including Ezra Pound, Wyndham Lewis, Ford Madox Ford, Roger Fry and May Sinclair. Shortly after the birth of her daughter she began a liaison with Cecil Maitland.

During the early 1920s Butts was mostly in Paris, where she became friends there with several writers and artists, including the painter Cedric Morris (a friend of her brother) and the artist, poet, and filmmaker Jean Cocteau, who illustrated her book, Imaginary Letters (1928). In mid-1921 she and Maitland spent about twelve weeks at Aleister Crowley's Abbey of Thelema in Sicily; she found the practices there shocking, and came away with a drug habit. In 1922 and 1923 she and Maitland spent periods near Tyneham, Dorset, and her novels of the 1920s make much of the Dorset landscape. In 1923 her book of stories, Speed the Plough and other stories was published; which was followed in 1925 by her first novel, Ashe of Rings (published by Robert McAlmon). Ashe of Rings is an anti-war novel with supernatural elements.

In 1927, she and Rodker were divorced. In 1928, Butts published Armed with Madness a novel featuring experimental Modernist writing revolving around the Grail legend. In 1930, she married the homosexual artist, William Park "Gabriel" Atkin or Aitken (1897–1937) (Mary then styled herself Mrs Aitken, but retained her maiden name for her writings). After a time in London and Newcastle, they settled in 1932 at Sennen on the Penwith peninsula on the western tip of Cornwall, but by 1934 the marriage had failed.

Butts was an ardent advocate of nature conservation, and attacked the pollution of the English countryside in her pamphlets Warning To Hikers and Traps For Unbelievers.

In 1933, at Sennen, she was introduced to the young novelist, Frank Baker, by George Manning-Sanders. Some time later, when Baker was living at Halamanning Valley with his friend John Raynor, she and Baker met again and became friends. They became members of the congregation of St Hilary's church, where Fr. Bernard Walke would produce nativity plays broadcast by the BBC.

Shortly before her death, she was working on a study of emperor Julian the Apostate. She died on 5 March 1937, at the age of forty-six, at the West Cornwall Hospital, Penzance, after an operation for a perforated gastric ulcer. Her funeral was held at St Sennen's Church, Sennen. Her autobiography, The Crystal Cabinet, was published a few months after her death. Her brother, Anthony, committed suicide in 1941 by throwing himself out of a window.

== Legacy ==
A portrait of Mary Butts was painted in 1924 by Cedric Morris, and a portrait drawing of her was made by Jean Cocteau (reproduced as a frontispiece to her memoir, The Crystal Cabinet).

Mary Butts's papers are held at the Beinecke Library at Yale University. A biography, Mary Butts: Scenes from the Life by Nathalie Blondel, was published in 1998.

== Published works ==
- 1912: Magick (Book 4), by Aleister Crowley, Butts given co-authorship credit
- 1923: Speed the Plough and other Stories
- 1925: Ashe of Rings
- 1928: Armed with Madness
- 1928: Imaginary Letters
- 1932: Death of Felicity Taverner
- 1932: Traps for Unbelievers
- 1932: Several Occasions
- 1932: Warning to Hikers
- 1933: The Macedonian (a study of Alexander the Great)
- 1935: Scenes from the Life of Cleopatra
- 1937: The Crystal Cabinet: My Childhood at Salterns (memoir)
- 1938: Last Stories

== Reprints by McPherson & Co ==
- 1992: From Altar to Chimney-Piece: Selected Stories. Preface by John Ashbery.
- 1992: The Taverner Novels: Armed with Madness & Death of Felicity Taverner. Preface by Paul West; afterword by Barbara Wagstaff.
- 1994: The Classical Novels: The Macedonian & Scenes from the Life of Cleopatra. Preface by Thomas McEvilley.
- 1998: Ashe of Rings and Other Writings. Preface by Nathalie Blondel.
- 2014: The Complete Stories of Mary Butts. Preface by John Ashbery; foreword by Bruce R. McPherson.
- 2021: The Collected Essays of Mary Butts. Edited and introduced by Joel Hawkes, with Bruce R. McPherson
