= Annie Walke =

English painter

- Born: Anne Fearon; 1877; Banstead, Surrey, England
- Died: 1965 (aged 87–88)
- Education: Cheltenham Ladies College, Chelsea School of Art, London School of Art
- Known for: Painter
- Spouse: Nicolo Bernard Walke

Annie Walke or Anne Fearon Walke (1877 in Banstead, Surrey – 1965 in Penzance) was an English artist. (Note: Cornwall Artists gives her year of birth as 1877 and her place of birth as Banstead, Surrey. There are other sources, such as Penlee, that give her year of birth as 1888, but that has to be wrong as she'd be 14 by the time she may have visited her sister in St Ives about 1902.) Anne Fearon grew up and was schooled in Banstead, Surrey. After completing her studies at the Chelsea School of Art and the London School of Art, she and her sister, Hilda Fearon, furthered their studies in Dresden, Germany. About the turn of the 20th century Miss Fearon settled in Cornwall, where she continued her studies and established a studio in the Cornish coastal village of Polruan.

After she married Nicolo Bernard Walke in 1911, she moved with him to St Hilary, Cornwall. where her husband became the vicar in 1913.

She was a member of the Newlyn School and other artists' organizations and created portraits and religious works for churches. Her work has been exhibited in England, Paris, America and South Africa. In the latter part of her life Walke was a published poet.

== Personal life ==
Anne Fearon was born in 1877 in Banstead, Surrey (just outside what is now the border of Greater London), one of six children born to Edith Jane Duffield Fearon and Paul Bradshaw Fearon, a successful London wine merchant. One of the four girls was a sister named Hilda, also an artist, (Note: Hilda studied at the Slade School of Fine Art. After studying at Slade and in Dresden, Hilda lived in St Ives, Cornwall from about 1900. There she lived at "The Cabin", currently a rental cottage, and studied under Gertrude and Algernon Talmage. About or after 1904, she moved to London.) who was born the year after Anne's birth.

Anne attended the Cheltenham Ladies College, Chelsea School of Art and the London School of Art. She exhibited her paintings at the Royal Academy and other venues in London. Her instructors included Sir William Orpen, Augustus John and Sir William Nicholson. After Anne and Hilda finished their formal studies in the London area, they travelled together for additional education in Dresden. Between about 1902 and 1904 she may have joined her sister in St Ives, Cornwall.

Example of works of her instructors

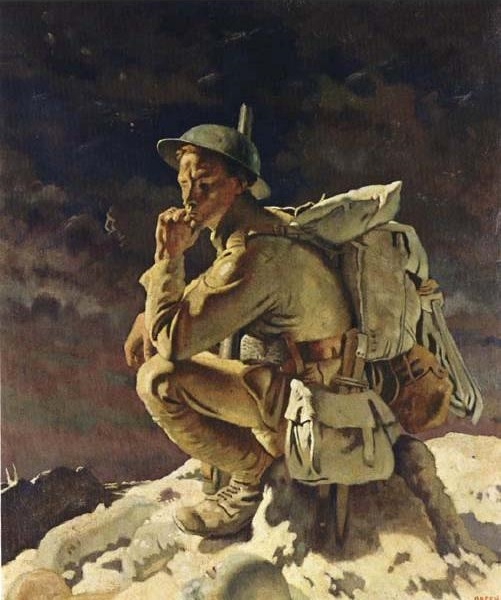
Sir William Orpen, The Thinker, 1918

Augustus John, Woman by a Riverbank, 1910–1912, Brooklyn Museum

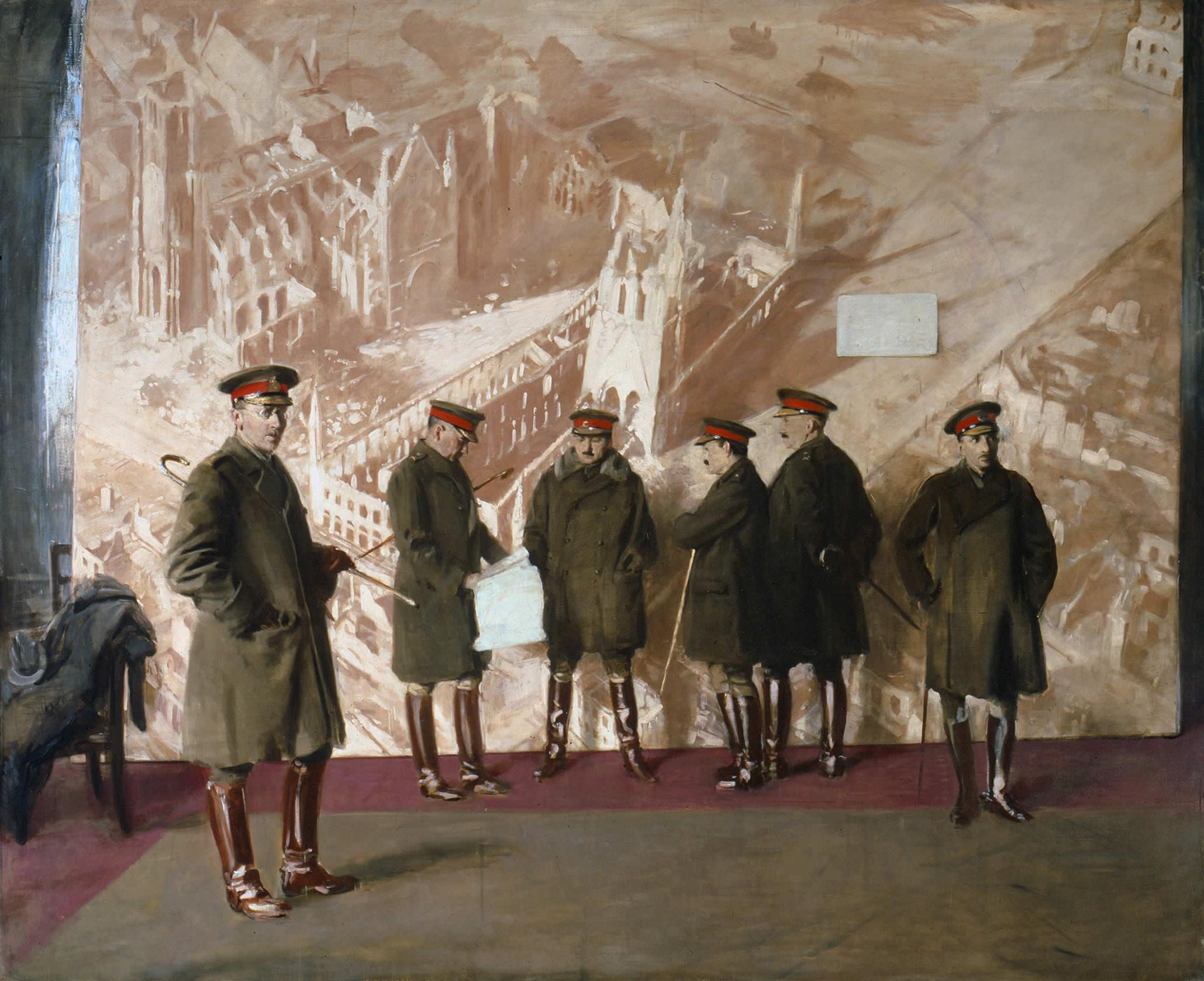
Sir William Nicholson, Canadian Headquarters Staff, 1918, Canadian War Museum, Ottawa

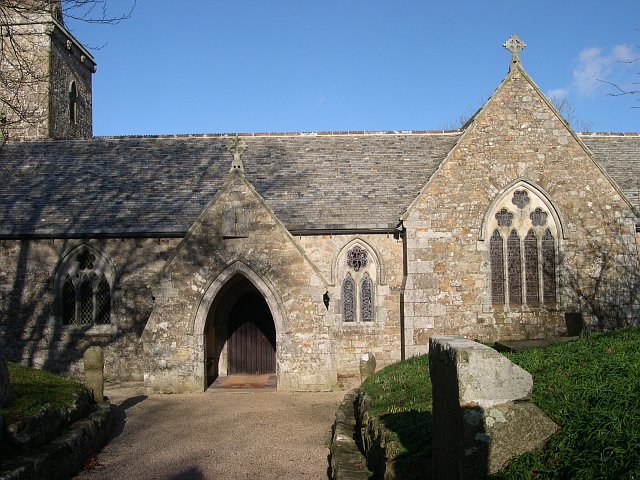
St Hilary Church, Cornwall

She married Nicolo Bernard "Ber" Walke, already an Anglican priest, in 1911 while he was a curate at Polruan where she had established a studio. Bernard Walke was appointed St Hilary Church's vicar in 1912, but not instituted to the living until 1913. He remained vicar until 1936. The couple was described by Newlyn School artist Laura Knight:

They were both long and thin, and Ber always wore dandy silk socks - he was not in the least like a parson to look at. A man with ideals that he lived up to — he was big-hearted enough to understand anyone and had it in him to enjoy vulgar fun as much as any. After we became intimate we often went to stay with the Walkes at St Hilary, as simple as any monastery in its furnishings.

The couple had no children but cared for a few orphans for a while. After Ber retired the couple settled in Mevagissey at The Battery. Bernard died on 25 June 1941 and was buried in Lelant Churchyard, near St Erth and St Hilary. Annie Walke remained at their home and continued painting until about 1950. After that, she wrote and had one book published in 1963. Anne Walke died in 1965 and was buried at St Erth.

== Career ==
About 1904 she set up a harbour-facing studio in Polruan, a southern Cornwall coastal town. Over her career she painted murals, figures and portraits. She was a member of the Royal Society for the Encouragement of Arts, Manufactures and Commerce, Newlyn Society of Artists and the St Ives Society of Artists.

In St Hilary Walke fashioned an artist's studio out of a horse's stable, bringing in extra light, wooden floors and an exterior garden. Of her work space it was said:

In this quiet unobtrusive little place, surrounded by tall shrubs, while the famous bells rang over the peaceful garden, the painter meditated and produced quiet-toned pictures of saints and portraits of distinction.

== Newlyn School ==
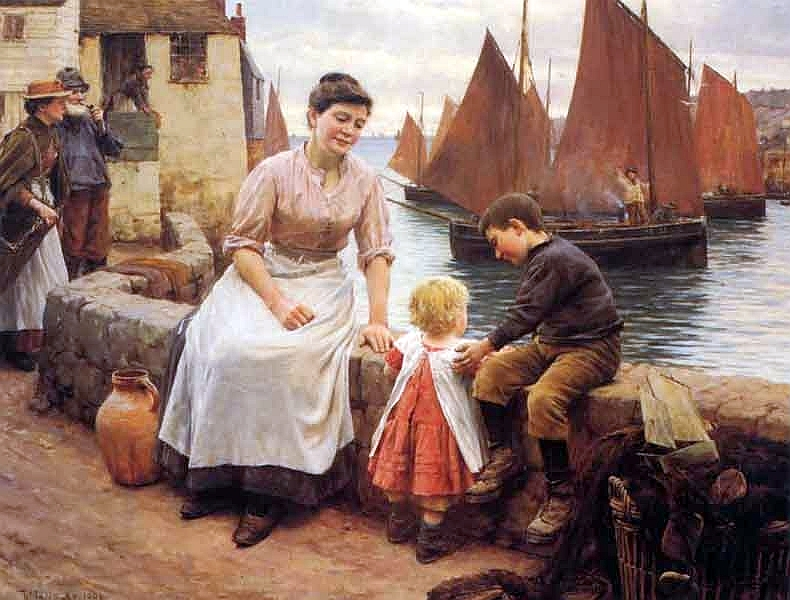
Walter Langley, The Greeting, 1904. Made by another member of the Newlyn School.

Walke met Laura Knight at an exhibition in Newlyn, but Annie and Bernard met more individuals from the Newlyn School through introduction by Alfred Munnings in 1915. Walke was a member of the Newlyn School, an artist colony in the Newlyn area of Cornwall. Because of his close association with area artists, her husband's book Twenty years at St Hilary is often used to research information about Cornwall artists.

The Jesus Chapel at Truro Cathedral, built at the expense of Bishop Walter Frere, was decorated by Annie Walke. The reredos depicts Christ in alb and girdle in the central panel, surrounded by scenes of various Cornish industries.

=== St Hilary Church commissions ===
Although the medieval St Hilary church was rebuilt in 1853, it lacked interior decoration. Works by Annie and some of their artist friends, like Laura Knight, Dod Procter, Ernest Procter, Harold Harvey, Roger Fry and Phyllis ("Pog") Yglesias were commissioned to decorate the church. These artists from the "Lamorna Group", (Note: The Lamorna Group included artists of the Newlyn School in the Lamorna valley.) created altarpieces, panels and other works. Among the works were some depicting a number of the Cornish saints.

One of Annie's works for the church was a Joan of Arc painting that was placed just inside the south door of the church. Ernest Procter made a work that depicts St Mawes, St Kevin and St Neot for the pulpit and a reredos of the Altar of the Dead. Annie, Dod and Ernest Procter, Gladys Hynes, Alethea and Norman Garstin and Harold Knight all made paintings for the sides of the stalls in the church. Pog Yglesias made the north wall's crucifix and nearby is Roger Fry's reredos. 12-year-old Joan Manning Saunders made the painted pictures for a chancel screen. The church "became one of the most notable shrines in the country."

== Works ==
=== Paintings ===
Her works include:

- The Annunciation, oil on board
- The Black Boat, oil on panel
- Head and shoulder portrait of a woman, oil on canvas
- London Child II, oil on canvas
- Portrait of a gentleman in a Spanish cloak (Reverend Bernard Walke), oil on canvas
- Questioning the man born blind, oil on canvas board
- Serapheta Convalescent
- Sorrowful Women, oil on canvas, stamped with the retailer's mark of James Lanham, St Ives.
- Thou Art Peter, oil on canvas board
- Toilers, oil on canvas
- White Tulips, est. 1940s, oil painting, Penlee House, Penzance

=== Works for churches ===
Her works include:

For Truro Cathedral

- A triptych altar piece
- Christ Mocked, ca 1935, oil on canvas, Royal Cornwall Museum, Truro, Cornwall (Note: Made with "typical 1930s stylisation.")
- Preaching from the Hill, oil on hardboard, Royal Cornwall Museum, Truro, Cornwall
- Reverend Bernard Walke and His Mother, oil on canvas, Royal Cornwall Museum, Truro, Cornwall
- St Christopher, oil on board, Royal Cornwall Museum, Truro, Cornwall

She has also commissioned work from

- St. Anselm's Catholic Church
- St. Mary's, Graham Street, London
- A Plympton church
- Penzance Girls' School Chapel
- St. Hilary Church.

== Exhibitions ==
Her work was shown at the following exhibitions:

- Leicester Galleries
- New English Art Club
- Newlyn Art Gallery (Passmore Edwards Art Gallery), Newlyn, Cornwall in March 1927
- Paris Salon
- Royal Institute of Oil Painters (ROI)
- Royal Society of British Artists (RBA)
- United Artists
- Other locations in America and South Africa

After her death, her works were exhibited at the following group exhibitions:

- 1993 - An Artistic Tradition, Penzance and District
- 1996 - Women Artists, Falmouth, Antigua and Barbuda (AG)
- 2002 - Women Painters, Penlee

== Publications ==
- A Boy Returns: and other poems. Haywards Heath, Sussex : Breakthru Publications 1964
- A selection of seven poems by the artist Annie Walke (1877–1965), Camborne (44, Trecarrack Road, Pengegon, Camborne, Cornwall): Philip Hills 2000.

The books are available at the Cornwall Centre.
