= Joan Manning-Sanders =

British artist and child prodigy

- Born: 17 May 1913; Torcross, Devon, England
- Died: 2002 (aged 88–89)
- Other names: Joan Floyd (married name)
- Known for: Painter; Child prodigy
- Notable work: The Brothers; The Concertina Players
- Spouse: Roderick Pierre Floyd
- Parents: Ruth Manning-Sanders; George Manning-Sanders

Joan Manning-Sanders (17 May 1913 – 2002) was a British artist regarded as a child prodigy.

== Biography ==
=== Early life ===
Manning-Sanders was born in Torcross, Devon on 17 May 1913. Her mother was poet and author Ruth Manning-Sanders. Her father was George Manning-Sanders, a writer of short stories. They also had a son, David, who was Joan Manning-Sanders's younger brother. Between 1914 and 1927, the Manning-Sanders family lived in Bude and Newlyn, Midhurst, Catchall, Sennen Cove, and Grasse, France.

Between the ages of 5 and 12, Joan Manning-Sanders and her brother did not attend school but were taught by their governess Florence Bridge. Manning-Sanders was encouraged by Bridge to visualise and draw her Bible with added inspiration from nature and books. This resulted in Manning-Sanders producing a series of Biblical images when she was 8. She also drew pictures of King Harold and King Canute to illustrate her history lessons.

When Manning-Sanders was 11, her work was commended by Father Bernard Walke of St Hilary's Church, Cornwall. He commissioned her to paint a set of six watercolours of the New Testament for the church. Around this time, Manning-Sanders was given her own studio next to the sea.

Aged 13, Manning-Sanders had her paintings The Pedlar and David and the Globe featured in the Young Artists' section of an exhibition organised by the Daily Express. To be featured in the exhibition, artists had to be aged at least 18. It was reported that Manning-Sanders's pictures were allowed because the Exhibition Committee misread Manning-Sanders's '13' as an '18' on her entry form.

=== Wider recognition and the Royal Academy ===
Manning-Sanders's paintings were regularly accepted into the Royal Academy of Arts until the 1930s and gained her a reputation as a child prodigy. In 1928, her first Academy picture The Brothers was featured at the exhibition at Burlington House. Manning-Sanders was 14. The Brothers depicts three fishermen, two of whom play draughts with beer beside them while the third watches. At the time, the painting was described as "almost touching genius" and it cemented her reputation as a prodigy. It was reported that admirers of the picture included Ramsay MacDonald.

In 1929, Manning-Sanders was the youngest exhibitor at the Royal Academy for the second year. Her picture Concertina Players, depicting four men playing the concertina was granted a place of honour. It was sold for £350.

In July 1929, a volume of Manning-Sanders's work was published by Faber and Faber called Drawings and Paintings by Joan Manning-Sanders. It includes an introduction by R. H. Wilenski and features 32 pieces of art produced by Manning-Sanders when she was between the ages of 8 and 16. The book was described in an article in The Cornishman as including "many striking examples of the richness and originality of a singularly gifted child's mind." Among the featured pictures are the New Testament paintings Manning-Sanders's produced for Bernard Walke's church.

In 1930, aged 17, Manning-Sanders's work was accepted into the Academy for the third time. Her painting was a life-size picture of her brother, David. It was described in The Graphic as being "an advance in technique on her previous paintings–it is a work of a fully conscious artist, and no longer the remarkable achievement of an unusually promising beginner." The exhibition also featured another of her paintings, The Chinner Family.

By the time she was 18, Manning-Sanders was a member of the Royal Institute of Oil Painters. In 1931, she had four works featured in the Royal Institute of Oil Painters' exhibition. In 1932 she held her own exhibition of paintings at Brook Street Gallery with over 40 paintings. In 1934 her picture of a sleeping boy was hung in the Academy's Yorkshire exhibition.

=== Later life ===
In 1938 Manning-Sanders married Roderick Pierre Floyd, a fellow artist. At the time she lived in Chelsea, London.

After her artistic success in the early 1930s, Manning-Sanders attended the Chelsea School of Art and painted in both Paris and St Ives. She had works featured with the New English Art Club, Society of Women Artists, Royal Society of Arts, and the Walker Art Gallery in Liverpool. However, she did not reach the same level of success as she did in her youth. Her figurative style went out of fashion and her attempts at a modernist technique did not prove successful.

During World War II, Manning-Sanders worked on developing Meteor jet aircraft in Gloucester. She later moved to Canada for a decade and practised as a portrait painter, after which she moved back to England and helped her mother research folk and fairy tales.

== Legacy ==
From 19 November 2011 to 14 January 2012, an exhibition of Manning-Sanders's work was held at Penlee House in Penzance titled A Forgotten Prodigy. The paintings were provided by Manning-Sanders's son, John Floyd, who had preserved the canvasses. The paintings were restored at the Painting Conservation Department at the Courtauld Institute Galleries in London.

The paintings created by Manning-Sanders for St Hilary's Church can still be seen in the Church's Lady Chapel.
