= St Neot =

St Neot may refer to:

- Saint Neot, a 9th-century monk from Cornwall
- St Neot, Cornwall, a village in Cornwall, England
- St Neots, a large town in Cambridgeshire, England
