= Filson Young =

Irish journalist (1876–1938)

Alexander Bell Filson Young (1876–1938) was a journalist from Northern Ireland, who published the first book about the sinking of the RMS Titanic, called Titanic, in 1912, only 37 days after the sinking. He was also an essayist, war correspondent in the Boer War and World War I, a programmes advisor to the BBC, and the author of two novels. Beside his literary work, he was an organist and composer, and a pioneer of motoring and aviation.

== Biography ==
Alexander Bell Filson Young was born in Ireland in 1876, at Ballyeaston, County Antrim. He was the son of the Revd. William Young and Sarah Young (née Filson).

His first publication was A Psychic Vigil (1896), which he issued under the pseudonym, 'X. Rays'.

Securing a job as a war correspondent for The Manchester Guardian, he was in South Africa during the Second Boer War. His accounts of his experiences and observations there formed the basis of his book, The Relief of Mafeking ... With an account of some earlier episodes (1900). This was followed in 1901 by his A Volunteer Brigade: notes of a week's field training ...and 'Mastersingers', musical criticism

Young was an early motoring enthusiast, and in 1904 published The Complete Motorist: being an account of the evolution and construction of the modern motor-car, with notes on the selection, use and maintenance of the same, and on the pleasures of travel upon the public roads (which went into eight editions), and The Joy of the Road (1907). To make a career in publishing he wrote continually on his many enthusiasms and on subjects which would interest the public. In 1903 appeared his Ireland at the Cross Roads; in 1905 his novel, The Sands of Pleasure (at the time considered a scandalous account of prostitution in Paris); in 1906 his Venus and Cupid: an impression .. after Velasquez ..., his Christopher Columbus and the New World and his Mastersingers: appreciations; in 1907 his The Wagner Stories and The Lover's Hours (poems); in 1908 a second novel, When the Tide Turns; in 1909 Memory Harbour: essays; in 1911 More Mastersingers (a second volume of musical criticism); in 1912 Opera Stories, his Letters from Solitude and Other Essays (reprinted from the Saturday Review) and A House in Anglesey (privately printed). Young also edited Outlook, and literary columns in The Saturday Review and the Daily Mail.

In 1911 Young visited Belfast to see the RMS Titanic under construction; and when it sank in 1912 his book about the disaster appeared little over a month afterwards.

In 1914 he made the first of four contributions to the "Notable Trials" series with an account of the trial of the Frederick Seddon and his wife. That year James Joyce's Dubliners was published by Grant Richards; Young had commended the book earlier when working as a reader for Richards. Joyce suggested that Young should write an introduction to the work which he preferred not to do.

Before World War I Young briefly spent time on Sir David Beatty's flagship, HMS Lion, and on the outbreak of war in 1914 he was able, through the influence of Admiral Lord Fisher, First Sea Lord, to enter the Royal Naval Volunteer Reserve and be assigned to Beatty's flagship again from November that year. He was at the Battle of Dogger Bank, but left the navy in 1915 before the Battle of Jutland in 1916. After the War he published in 1921 With Beatty in the North Sea and With the Battlecruisers. He also wrote the article on David Beatty for the 12th edition of Encyclopædia Britannica (1922).

He also continued his writing on a variety of other subjects – A Christmas Card (1914), New Leaves: essays (1915), Cornwall and a Light Car (1926), and he resumed his contributions to the "Notable Trials" series, with accounts of the trials of H. H. Crippen (1919), Edith Thompson and Frederick Bywaters (1923) and Herbert Rowse Armstrong (1926).

In the early days of broadcasting he came to know John Reith and in 1926 became an adviser on radio programmes for the BBC. From 1930 to 1936 he contributed a weekly essay to the BBC's periodical, Radio Times. In the early 1930s a proposed television play based on Young's book, Titanic (1912), was shelved because of protests by relatives of persons involved in the sinking. From 1926 he produced a succession of folk plays by Fr Bernard Walke to be produced by the BBC from St Hilary Church, Cornwall.

He continued with some writing on miscellaneous subjects. In 1934 his Shall I Listen? - Studies in the Adventure of Broadcasting appeared.

At the age of fifty-eight, in 1936 he learned to fly; and in the same year published his radio broadcasts of the experience as Growing Wings.

Young was also an able photographer. A bromide print by him of Max Beerbohm is held by the National Portrait Gallery, London.

He died in 1938 in London. His funeral was held at St Mary's church, Bourne Street. He was twice married, latterly to Vera (née Rawnsley) North in 1918 (whose third husband would be the writer Clifford Bax), with whom he had two sons, William David Loraine Filson-Young and Richard Filson-Young (b. 1921). Both were killed as Royal Air Force pilots in World War II – Richard in 1942 and William (Billy) in 1945.
