= Denys Val Baker =

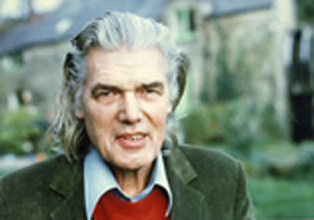
- Born: Denys Baker; 24 October 1917; Poppleton, England
- Died: 6 July 1984 (aged 66); Penzance, England
- Occupations: Novelist; journalist; short story writer; editor
- Writing career
- Pen name: David Eames, Henry Trevor, David Valentine
- Genres: Autobiography, short story

Denys Val Baker (24 October 1917 – 6 July 1984) was a Welsh writer, specialising in short stories, novels, and autobiography. He was also known for his activities as an editor, and promotion of the arts in Cornwall.

== Early years ==
Born Denys Baker in Poppleton, York, North Riding of Yorkshire on 24 October 1917 where his father, the Welsh-born Valentine Henry Baker, was stationed as a pilot instructor during World War I. His mother was Dilys Eames, who was from Anglesey in North Wales and had played harp at the National Eisteddfod of 1901. He grew up in Sussex and eventually lived with his parents in Surbiton, then in Surrey, now in Greater London.

Val Baker was always proud of being of Celtic ancestry; he considered himself to be more Welsh than English, and this was an influence in his writings.

A lifelong pacifist and vegetarian, he registered as a conscientious objector in June 1939, prior to World War II, and volunteered to join a group of some 200 COs sailing to Jersey in May 1940 to work on the tomato and potato harvests. The impending German invasion of the Channel Islands led to the return of half of the COs, including Val Baker. He became secretary of a pacifist community, Youth House, in Camden Town. and carried out rescue work in London during the Blitz.

== Career ==
Val Baker showed an interest in writing from when a young man. He was particularly drawn to the short story format, which was very popular in the 1920s and 1930s, and he would send stories to many magazines. Thanks to his father's contacts with the Harmsworth family, Val Baker managed to get a job as a reporter on the Derby Evening Telegraph, one of the Harmsworth family's regional titles, and stayed there for three years. After that he moved to London where he worked as a jobbing journalist on various trade papers.

He was by now beginning to supplement his income through freelance journalism and sales of short stories to the many literary magazines that were popular in the days before television. He had by this time legally changed his surname to Val Baker in honour of his father, who had died in a flying accident in September 1942.

Val Baker started publishing his own quarterly magazine Opus, (later to be renamed Voices) in the early 1940s, which featured stories, poems and reviews by his contemporaries- many of whom went on to be well-known writers. In 1943 he produced the first of his annual Little Reviews Anthologies through Allen & Unwin, which presented the best of that year's output from the country's many literary magazines. There were also a series of anthologies of short stories by British and international writers.

As a writer of fiction his career really started with Selected Stories, which was a little stapled paperback issued in 1944. This was quickly followed by Worlds Without End, a hardback published in 1945, and then his first novel The White Rock in the same year. The latter was also published in US and the Netherlands. A second novel The More We Are Together soon followed and then a third The Widening Mirror in 1949.

Val Baker was also increasing his output of short stories, many of which were not only published in magazines, but also read on the BBC's Morning Story programme. Over the years, he had well over 100 stories read on BBC radio.

Val Baker had always been enchanted by Cornwall, and he eventually moved there firstly to Penzance, Sennen and St Hilary eventually to St.Ives in 1956. This change was to mark a new era in his writing career. While continuing to write short stories, he also launched the publication The Cornish Review in 1949. The Cornish Review featured poems, short stories, articles, art and book reviews. This quarterly magazine lasted three years and ten issues. In 1966 Val Baker revived the Review with much the same mixture, this time it lasted for twenty six issues until it folded in 1974. An Index to "The Cornish Review" by Phoebe Proctor was published by the Institute of Cornish Studies in 1978; "The Cornish Review" magazine: an illustrated bibliography by Tim Scott was published by Cornish Connections / Hare's Ear ISBN 0-9515686-2-0.

In 1959 he published the acclaimed Britain's Art Colony by the Sea about the artistic community of Cornwall, and particularly based around St. Ives. Val Baker lived in various places in Cornwall as his family kept growing. The family life in Corwall was to provide the basis for many autobiographical, humorous books. The first of which, The Sea’s in The Kitchen, was published in 1962 by Phoenix House and was to be his best selling book since the 1940s. This was soon followed by The Door is Always Open in 1963 and eventually by another twenty four.

Another aspect of his life was his interest in the sea. When Val Baker purchased his own boat, MFV Sanu, an ex-navy supply tender, it was an inspiration for his books, short stories, and magazine articles.

In the 1960s and 1970s he continued with a prolific creative output, mainly through the publisher William Kimber & Co. But finally, from the early 1980s, onwards Val Baker's health began to deteriorate and he suffered excruciating pain from irritable bowel syndrome, an illness that seems to have practically curtailed his writing career.

== Death ==
On 6 July 1984 Val Baker died at the West Cornwall Hospital, Penzance at the age of sixty six. He had written fourteen novels, twenty two collections of short stories, twenty six autobiographies, over forty anthologies, another twenty books on general subjects as well as hundreds of short stories and articles for magazines throughout the world. The popularity of his books was reinforced when with the introduction of Public Lending Rights in the year of his death, the royalties put him in the top 120 of most borrowed authors of over 6000 who had registered.

== Family life ==
He was married twice. His first marriage was to Librarian Patricia Johnson whom he met in 1942. They had one son, Martin, born in 1944. This marriage collapsed and ended in 1948. At this point Val Baker moved to Cornwall. He lived there for the rest of his life except for a three-year sojourn in London and one year in Bermuda.

He married Jess Bryan (b. 1922) in 1949. Bryan brought to the family Gillian (b. 1945) and Jane (b. 1947). The family slowly grew with the births of Stephen in 1949, Demelza in 1951, and Genevieve in 1954.

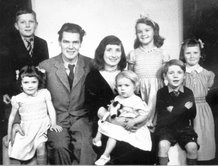
Denys, Jess, and family

His life in Cornwall really began in 1948 when he rented a small cottage at the foot of Trencrom Hill just outside St Ives. But as the family quickly grew, following the marriage with Jess, they moved from Trencrom to Penzance and then to Sennen Cove.

Then, the Val Bakers were able to buy the seventeen-room Old Vicarage, St Hilary, the house featured in Bernard Walke's book Twenty Years at St Hilary. At this time Jess took lessons with the potter David Leach in Penzance and soon opened up a studio pottery, which continued for at least twenty years.

In 1954 the Val Bakers left St Hilary and moved to Kent and then to London. But three years later they returned to Cornwall to a tiny rented cottage in Virgin Street, St Ives and then to Church Place before in 1958 moving to St Christopher's a house overlooking Porthmeor beach. It was here that the pottery run by Jess began to be successful, and Denys would often be found there both writing and serving customers. It was also here that Denys started on a series of autobiographical books, inspired by family life at St Christopher's.

In 1967 the family moved to the Old Sawmills, an isolated, rambling house located in extensive woodland up a creek at Golant on the river Fowey approachable only by boat or walking along the railway belonging to English China Clays. It was here that Denys settled for five years, writing in an old shed/studio on the sunny side of the creek. By now most of the older children had set out on their ways but they often returned with friends, and the Sawmills was always a very busy place. One of the reasons for this move was the safe mooring available for the newly purchased 60 ft ex-navy supply tender MFV Sanu. Meanwhile, the Mask Pottery in Fowey continued to be run by Jess, with the help of Stephen and Demelza. Jess was offered the opportunity of running a course teaching the pottery in Bermuda so she and Denys spent a year there.

On their return in 1972, with MFV Sanu now moored in the Mediterranean, they started planning to move to another old millhouse, at Crean between St. Buryan and Land's End in 1972. As at Golant, Denys continued writing in a shed for a studio. Along the cliff footpath at Zennor, there is a bench overlooking the sea, which is dedicated to the memory of Denys Val Baker.

== Selected bibliography ==
=== Novels ===
- The White Rock: Sylvan Press, 1945
- The More We Are Together: Sampson Low, 1947
- The Widening Mirror: Sampson Low, 1949
- A Journey With Love: Bridgehead USA 1955.
- The Titles My Own: (as David Eames) Bless 1955.
- As The River Flows: Milton House, 1974.
- Company of Three: Milton House, 1974.
- Don't Lose Your Cool Dad: Milton House 1975
- Barbican's End: William Kimber:1979
- Rose: William Kimber: 1980.

=== Short story collections ===
- Selected Stories: Staples and Staples 1944 ?
- Worlds Without End: Sylvan Press 1945.
- The Return of Uncle Walter: Sampson Low 1949
- Strange Fulfillment: Pyramid Books USA, 1959.
- The Flame Swallower: J. L. Lake, 1963.
- The Strange and the Damned: Pyramid, 1964.
- Bizarre Loves: Belmont Books, USA, 1964.
- Strange Possession: Pyramid 1965.
- Strange Journeys: Pyramid, 1966.
- The Face in the Mirror: Arkham House USA 1971.
- Woman & the Engine Driver United Writers 1972
- A Summer to Remember: William Kimber 1975.
- Echoes from Cornish Cliffs: Kimber 1976.
- The Secret Place: William Kimber 1977.
- Passenger to Penzance: William Kimber 1978.
- At the Seas Edge: William Kimber 1979.
- The House on the Creek: William Kimber 1981.
- Thomasina's Island: William Kimber 1981.
- The Girl in the Photograph: Wm Kimber 1982.
- Martin's Cottage: William Kimber1983.
- At the Rainbow's End: William Kimber 1983.
- A Work of Art: William Kimber 1984.
- The Tenant: William Kimber 1985.

=== Autobiographies ===
- The Sea's in the Kitchen: Phoenix House 1962
- The Door is Always Open: Phoenix House 1963.
- We'll Go Round the World Tomorrow: 1965
- To Sea with Sanu: John Baker: 1967.
- Adventures Before Fifty: John Baker 1969.
- Life Up The Creek: John Baker 1971.
- The Petrified Mariner: William Kimber 1972.
- An Old Mill by the Stream: Wm Kimber 1973.
- Spring at Lands End: William Kimber 1974.
- Sunset Over the Scillies: William Kimber 1975.
- A View from the Valley: William Kimber 1976
- The Wind Blows from the West: Kimber 1977
- A Long Way to Land's End: Kimber 1977
- All This and Cornwall Too: Kimber 1978.
- A Family for all Seasons: Wm Kimber 1979.
- As the Stream Flows By: Wm Kimber 1980.
- Upstream at the Mill: William Kimber 1981.
- A Family at Sea: William Kimber 1981.
- The Waterwheel Turns: William Kimber 1982.
- Summer at the Mill: William Kimber 1982.
- Family Circles: William Kimber 1983.
- Down a Cornish Lane: William Kimber 1983.
- The Mill in the Valley: William Kimber1984.
- When Cornish Skies are Smiling: WK1984
- My Cornish World: William Kimber 1985.
- Cornish Prelude: William Kimber 1985.

=== Other works ===
- Paintings from Cornwall: Cornish Library 1950
- Britain Discovers Herself: Johnson & Co 1950
- How to be an Author: Harvill Press 1952
- The Pottery Book: Cassell 1959
- Pottery: (as Henry Trevor) Constable 1963
- The Young Potter: Nicholas Kaye 1963
- Fun With Pottery: Kaye & Ward 1973
- The Spirit of Cornwall: W. H. Allen 1980
- Let's make Pottery: Warne 1981
- A View from Land's End: William Kimber 1982

=== Edited books include ===
- Preludes: (Poetry Anthology) Opus Press 1942
- Little Reviews: 1914–43 P.E.N. Books 1943
- Little Reviews Anthologies: Allen & Unwin 1943, 1944, 1945, 1946, 1947/48 and 1949
- International Short Stories: W. H. Allen 1944
- Writing Today: Staples & Staples 1943, 1944, 1945 & 1946
- London Aphrodite: Stories from the New Elizabethan Era: Bridgehead Books, 1955
- Ghosts in Country House: William Kimber 1981
- When Churchyards Yawn: William Kimber 1982
- Stories of Haunted Inns: William Kimber 1982
- Ghosts in Country Villages: William Kimber 1983

=== Literary magazines published ===
- Opus: Quarterly (1–14) in London ca. 1940–1943 (No. 14, spring 1943: Wigginton, Tring, Herts: Opus Press)
- Voices: Opus renamed around ca. 1943–46
- Cornish Review: Quarterly !949-52 & !966-74
