= St Hilary, Cornwall =

Coordinates: 50.130°N 5.428°W

St Hilary
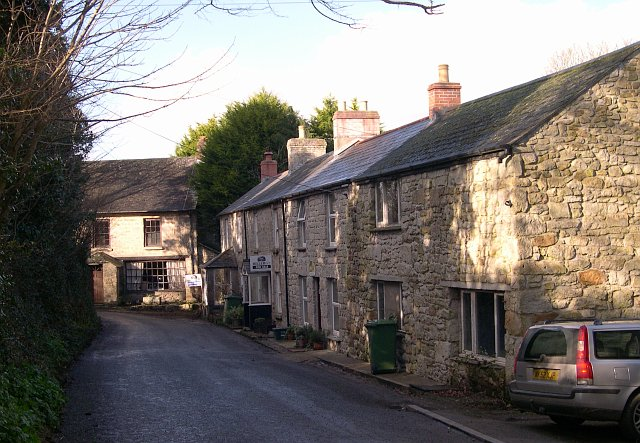
- Cottages near St Hilary Church

- Location within Cornwall
- Population: 821 (2011 census)
- OS grid reference: SW550312
- Unitary authority: Cornwall
- Ceremonial county: Cornwall
- Region: South West
- Country: England
- Sovereign state: United Kingdom
- Post town: PENZANCE
- Postcode district: TR20
- Dialling code: 01736
- Police: Devon and Cornwall
- Fire: Cornwall
- Ambulance: South Western
- UK Parliament: St Ives

St Hilary is a civil parish and village in west Cornwall, England, United Kingdom. It is situated approximately five miles (8 km) east of Penzance and four miles (6.5 km) south of Hayle.

Chynoweth is an area immediately north of St Hilary churchtown. The land of the parish is high enough to provide views of bays on both coasts, St Ives Bay five miles north and Mount's Bay two miles south.

For the purposes of local government St Hilary has a parish council and elects councillors every four years. The principal local authority in the area is Cornwall Council. During the height of mining activity the population was three times that in the 1930s.

== Geology ==
The area has many former mines: especially notable was a mine called Wheal Fortune which extended into the parish of Ludgvan. Penberthy Croft Mine, to the north of the parish, was designated a Site of Special Scientific Interest in 1993 and is noted as the most important site in Britain for secondary ore minerals of lead, copper, and arsenic. Wheal Jewell, a mine between Marazion and Goldsithney, put its 40-inch cylinder pumping-engine up for auction on 21 July 1884, along with other plant and tools.

An earthquake occurred in St Hilary in 1796.

== Notable buildings ==
The parish church is dedicated to Saint Hilary of Poitiers and is in the Early English style but had to be rebuilt after a fire in 1853. It has a 13th-century tower and is a Grade I listed building. Ennys Manor farm on Trewhella Lane dates from 1688, and was the home of the Millet family until the 19th century and then passed by marriage to the Grylls family.

A children's home existed in St Hilary in the 1920s and 1930s, accommodated in a former pub, the Jolly Tinners.

== Notable residents ==
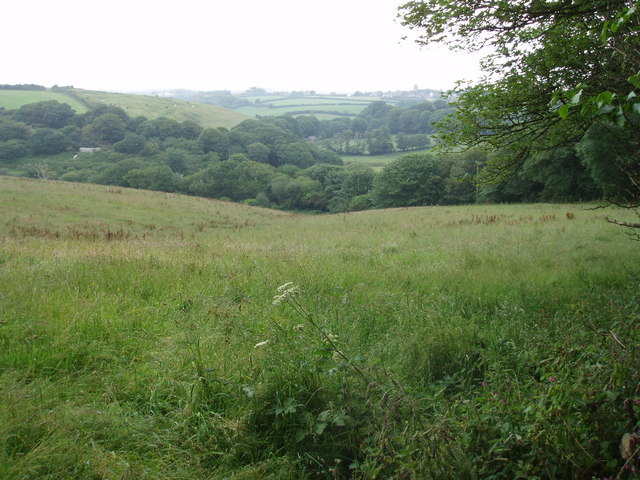
The valley at Wheal Fortune

Notable people from the parish include three former Vicars, the writer Denys Val Baker, and the artist Anne (Annie) Walke (wife of Bernard Walke).

Malachy Hitchins was an astronomer and Vicar of St Hilary. Thomas Pascoe was Vicar of St Hilary for 56 years in the 19th century. Bernard Walke was Vicar of St Hilary, from 1913 to 1936. Father Walke was the author of four religious plays and of an autobiography, Twenty Years at St Hilary (London: Methuen & Co., 1935; reissued by Mott, London, 1982 with an introduction by Frank Baker and ISBN 0-907746-04-7).

The youngest son of Malachy Hitchins, Fortescue Hitchins (1784–1814), was born at St Hilary. He became a solicitor at St Ives, Cornwall, and was the author of "The Tears of Cornubia" and other poems. He compiled material for a history of Cornwall, which after his death was edited by Samuel Drew, and published in 1824.

== Legend ==
The ghost of Rev. John Penneck, Chancellor of Exeter, (died 1724) is said to raise great storms here.
