= Gladys Hynes =

British painter (1888-1958)

1921 portrait of Hynes

Gladys Hynes (1888 – 1958) was an English modernist painter, sculptor, illustrator and designer of English and Irish heritage. Trained in the London School of Art and in the Forbes School of Painting in Cornwall, she worked in the Omega Workshops where she mixed with the pioneers of Cubism and Vorticism. She exhibited at the Royal Academy, with the Friday Club, the London Group and the International Society of Sculptors, Painters and Gravers. Her painting, Escalator (1922), now lost, was selected to represent Britain at the Venice Biennale in 1924. In 1928 she illustrated A Draft of the Cantos 17 to 27 of Ezra Pound published by John Rodker. Despite her successful exhibiting career and her connection to key movements of twentieth-century British art, many of her artworks have been lost to view.

== Early life and education ==
Gladys Margaret Jermyn Hynes was born on 9 November 1888 in Indore (now in Madhya Pradesh), India to a family with deep roots in the British Raj. Her father, Harry Hynes (1844-1919) worked for the Bank of Bombay; her Irish grandfather, James Lewis Hynes (1814-1896), transferred from military service to the East India Company in Bombay (Mumbai); her uncle George Hynes was assistant Director General of the Post Office of India.Her English mother, Edith Power (1856-1911), came from a medical and clerical family. Hynes identified strongly with her Irish great-grandfather, Patrick Hynes (1787-c. 1850), whom she believed to have fought in the United Irishmen’s rebellion of 1798.

In 1890 Harry Hynes retired to London, settling the family in Bayswater and later Ealing. Hynes was mostly educated at home by a governess. From 1904 to 1906 she attended the Ealing School of Art’s Vacation Sketch Club. In 1908 she enrolled in the London School of Art under Frank Brangwyn and John Macallan Swan. There she forged important friendships with Welsh artist Nina Hamnett and with Annie Walke (then Fearon).

== Cornwall and Omega ==
After Hynes’s mother’s death in 1911, the family settled in Penzance. Attending the Forbes School of Painting, she joined the resident artists of the Newlyn School: Harold Harvey and Gertrude Harvey, Dod Procter and Ernest Procter, Harold Knight and Laura Knight, Norman Garstin and Alethea Garstin, and Colwyn Edward Vulliamy, known as C.E.V. or Tom, who married her sister Eileen in 1916. In Newlyn she painted 344 Oakley Crescent, Chelsea (1912), now lost, which was exhibited at the Royal Academy Summer Exhibition of 1912. Shortly after she completed In the Park (1912).

In 1913 Hynes returned to London to work at the Omega Workshops founded by the Bloomsbury Group’s Roger Fry, Vanessa Bell and Duncan Grant.The Omega employed part-time artists on subsistence wages to apply modernist designs to textiles, furniture and interior decoration, with time left over to pursue their own art. Hynes worked alongside Nina Hamnett, Winifred Gill, Frederick Etchells and his sister Jessica, mixing with Wyndham Lewis, William Roberts and Henri Gaudier-Brzeska.

Family responsibilities necessitated Hynes’s return to Penzance on the outbreak of World War I, reuniting with friends near Newlyn and befriending the newly arrived Gluck, Effie Craig, Cedric Morris, his sister Nancy, and Arthur Lett-Haines. Hynes’s Omega exposure to Cubism surfaces in Boys Bathing in Harbour (c. 1916, known only in preliminary study) and The Chalk Quarry (c. 1916). The impact of the war is evident in Morning (1916) and The Fowler (1917-19). In 1916 Bernard Walke, Anglo-Catholic minister of St Hilary’s Church in nearby Marazion, who had married Hynes’s fellow-student Annie Walke (née Fearon), commissioned Hynes and Dod Procter, Harold Knight, Harold Harvey, Norman Garstin and his daughter Alethea Garstin, under the direction of Ernest Procter, to paint the church’s choir stalls with scenes of Cornish saints.

== London ==
In 1919 Harry Hynes died and Hynes settled permanently in London. With her siblings Sheelah and Hugh, she shared a large house in Hampstead with writer Mary Butts, and her husband, poet John Rodker. Other lodgers included actress Elsa Lanchester, and musician, director and actor Harold Scott. Rodker ran the Ovid Press in the basement, publishing poetry by Ezra Pound and T.S. Eliot and graphic works by Wyndham Lewis, Edward Wadsworth, Henri Gaudier-Brzeska , and Roald Kristian.

In 1920 Hynes exhibited Noah’s Ark (1920) at the Friday Club and in 1921 Cornish Wrestlers (1920, untraced) in the International Society of Sculptors, Painters and Gravers’ exhibition. The London Underground inspired The Strap-hangers (1922) and Escalator (1922); the latter was selected to represent Britain and the 1924 Venice Biennale. Tables (1921) portrays Hamnett and Lett-Haines in the Le Dôme Café in Paris.

In 1924 Hynes and her siblings moved to 41 Haverstock Hill, only doors from the lodgings of other artists: Bernard Adeney and his wife Noël Gifford Adeney, John Farleigh and his wife Elsie Wooden, Mary Adshead and her husband Stephen Bone, William Roberts and Mark Gertler. In the late 1930s many of these houses were demolished and the artists, including Hynes, moved around the corner to Provost Road. Apart from the duration of World War II, Hynes lived in 4 Provost Road for the rest of her life.

By 1923 Hynes’s focus had turned to sculpture. Most of these works are lost, with the exception of her polychromatic bust Anthony Butts (1925). Madonna and Child, in carved and lacquered wood, exhibited at the Royal Academy in 1930, was stolen from its church home in 1989. Her Woman with Clasped Hands, included in Lucy Wertheim’s Modern Wood Carvings exhibition in 1932, has disappeared. Hynes’s artistic versatility is evident in the commissions she fulfilled across various media. She created decorative masks for scenographer and set designer Vladimir Polunin and for Bernard Shaw’s play, Androcles and the Lion in 1924-5. She fashioned a processional banner for the St Joan Social and Political Alliance. She designed book jackets for the publisher Constable and Co. John Rodker commissioned her to illuminate the deluxe folio edition of A Draft of the Cantos 17-27 of Ezra Pound: Initials by Gladys Hynes (1928) in which her designs become an integral part of the text.

== Politics ==
Inspired by her rebel great-grandfather, Hynes was a fervent Irish Republican. In 1919 she enrolled in London’s Gaelic League, ready to support Dáil Éireann, the self-declared Irish parliament. She befriended its Director of Publicity, Desmond FitzGerald, assisting him with the Dáil’s underground newspaper, the Irish Bulletin. In December 1921 the war between Britain and separatist Ireland ended with the Anglo-Irish Treaty. Its failure to deliver full Irish independence caused many former rebels to reject it, a rupture which brought about the Irish Civil War. FitzGerald accepted the Treaty, becoming a minister in the Irish Free State government. Hynes aligned herself with Irish Republicans, including FitzGerald’s wife Mabel, in rejecting it. Hynes nevertheless accepted FitzGerald’s requests to design a ministerial seal and postal stamps for the new nation, although no commissions followed. They remained friends; her last sculpture Aengus Óg (unfinished, lost) was intended as a memorial to Desmond and Mabel FitzGerald. Her friendship with maverick Irish rebel and socialist Jack White was also lifelong.

Hynes was received into the Roman Catholic Church in 1941, her sister Eileen following in 1943. Their younger sister Sheelah had been a Catholic from the 1920s.

Hynes’s politics was generally progressive. She was a feminist and suffragist, supporting St Joan’s Social and Political Alliance (originally called the Catholic Women’s Suffrage Society). The horror of World War I, especially the death of her young airman brother, disposed her towards pacifism. The influence of socialism is evident in In the Park (1912); Private View (1937) challenges the heterosexual establishment. Yet other elements signal disturbing ambivalences; indications of Antisemitism draw attention to her lifelong friendship with Ezra Pound.The surface reading of some of her artworks is destabilized: the pacifism of her World War II paintings, Crucifixion (1939) and Resurgimus (1941) is undercut by the paranoid menace of the Surrealist Eyes that Guard Us (1940) and by the cryptic cartoon style of Penny for the Guy (1940).

During World War II Hynes could not communicate with Ezra Pound, living in Italy since the mid-1920s, as Italy was now an enemy nation. He had long denounced finance capitalism, a preoccupation fueled by his virulent Antisemitism. Broadcasting to the United States from Rome Radio, he blamed all social ills, including war, on Jewish control. After the war he was repatriated to the United States and charged with treason. Declared mentally unfit to face trial he was detained in a psychiatric hospital in Washington, D.C. Over the twelve years of confinement many literary figures campaigned for his release. Hynes also intervened, attempting unsuccessfully to engage Luigi Sturzo, Catholic priest and Italian politician, on Pound’s behalf.

The controversy over Pound’s Antisemitism intensified in April 1958 when he was released from the psychiatric hospital. In May Hynes defended him against these charges in a letter to the Observer:

'Ezra Pound is not and has never been, an anti-Semite; he hates Usury, the Jewish people have been, and still are, much concerned with the manipulating of money… Ezra Pound hates Usury, not Jews, he has always had Jews among his personal friends.'

Hynes died after a fall on 20 November 1958, bequeathing her estate to her sister Sheelah.

== Legacy ==
Sheelah began selling Hynes’s works in the early 1970s through several London galleries. The Royal Air Force Museum purchased Crucifixion (1939), the Musée du Petit Palais in Geneva Morning (1916). The Wolfsonian-Florida International University, Miami Beach acquired The Chalk Quarry (1916), The Fowler (c. 1917-19), The Strap-hangers (1922) and Resurgimus (1941). In 1972 her work was included in The Café Royalists: An Exhibition of Café Royal Artists at the Parkin Gallery, London, and in the same gallery in 1973, in its Blood, Sweat & Tears: 1940 and All That exhibition.

In 1988 Yale University’s Beinecke Library which had acquired Hynes’s original drawings for the illuminations of Pound’s A Draft of Cantos 17-27, along with the poet’s letters to her, created a large display, The Cantos of Ezra Pound: A Poem Including History, curated by Prof. Lawrence C. Rainey.

The Gladys Hynes: Radical Lives exhibition at Charleston in Lewes (United Kingdom) to 11 October 2026, places her works in the avant-garde circles in which she moved. The Wolfsonian-FIU will hold a Gladys Hynes retrospective from February 2027 to February 2028.

== List of Works ==
The following is a list of some of Hynes's works:

Asses, pencil on paper

A Four-Panel Screen Featuring Animals of the Antipodes

A Penny for the Guy, oil on board

A Tropical Fantasy, oil on board

Anthony Butts, wood with oil paint

Back view of gardens, Provost Road, watercolour

Boys Bathing in Harbour (preliminary study), oil and pencil on panel

Cat in a Tree, watercolour and crayon on paper

Cherubs, gouache on paper

Circus Clowns, oil on panel

Crucifixion, oil on board

Escalator, oil on panel

In the Park, oil on canvas

Love on the Allotment, pencil on paper

Madonna and Child, carved and lacquered wood

Martin de Porres [1], oil on board

Martin de Porres [2], oil on board

Morning, oil on panel

Noah’s Ark, oil on canvas

Original designs for the Cantos, various media on paper

Pot and napkin rings, paint and lacquer on wood

Private View, oil on panel

Resurgimus, oil on board

Still life, oil on board,

St Morwena, oil on panel

Straphangers, oil on panel

Study for a memorial picture, pen, gold leaf and watercolour on paper

Study for Aengus Óg, wood

Study for Strap-hangers, pencil on paper

Study for a mural, oil on paper

Study of parrots, pencil and chalk on paper

Tables, oil on panel

The Chalk Quarry, oil on canvas

The Eyes that Guard Us, oil on paper laid on board

The Eyes that Guard Us (calendar), watercolour on paper

The Family Bungalow in Indore, India, watercolour on paper

The Fowler, oil on canvas,

The Innocence of War, oil on board

The Night Journey, pencil on paper

== Exhibitions ==
1912 Passmore Edwards Art Gallery, Newlyn

1912 Royal Academy Summer Exhibition

1916 London Group, Goupil Gallery

1916 International Society of Sculptor, Painters and Gravers, Grosvenor Gallery

1920 The Friday Club, Alpine Gallery

1920 International Society of Sculptor, Painters and Gravers, Grosvenor Gallery

1921 International Society of Sculptor, Painters and Gravers, Grafton Gallery

1922 Daily Express Woman’s Exhibition

1922 Hull Art Gallery

1923 Daily Express Woman’s Exhibition

1924 British Pavilion, Venice Biennale

1930 Royal Academy Summer Exhibition

1932 Modern Wood Carvings, Lucy Wertheim Gallery

Posthumous

1972 The Café Royalists: An Exhibition of Café Royal Artists, Parkin Gallery

1973 Blood, Sweat & Tears and All That, Parkin Gallery

2026 Gladys Hynes: Radical Lives, Charleston at Lewes

== Museums and Gallery Holdings ==
Beinecke Rare Book and Manuscripts Library, Yale University: Original designs for the Cantos (1928)

RAF Museum, Crucifixion (1940)

Recovering Art by Women [RAW] Collection: The Night Journey (1922); Cat in a Tree (1937) ; Morning (1916); Anthony Butts (1925); A Penny for the Guy (1940)

St Hilary Church, Marazion: St Morwena (1916-19)

Tate Archive: The Eyes that Guard Us: wartime calendar (1940)

Wolfsonian–FIU, Miami: The Chalk Quarry (c. 1916); The Fowler (c. 1917–19); Study for Strap-hangers(1922); Resurgimus (1941)
