= Frank Baker (writer) =

British writer

Francis Baker (22 May 1908 – 6 November 1983) was a British writer of novels and short stories, mainly on fantastic or supernatural themes. He was also an actor, musician and television scriptwriter. His best-known works are his novels, The Birds (1936) and Miss Hargreaves (1940), and his memoir, I Follow But Myself (1968).

== Biography ==
Francis Baker was born at Hornsey in London in 1908, the son of a marine insurance salesman (who had been a chorister at Magdalen College, Oxford) and grandson of an organist at Alexandra Palace. During World War I he was a weekly boarder at schools in Crouch End and Stafford; and from 1919 to 1924 he was a chorister at Winchester Cathedral and was educated at the cathedral choir school (The Pilgrims' School), when William Holden Hutton was dean of the cathedral.

Baker left school at the age of sixteen, and for the next five years (1924 to 1929) worked at the London Assurance Company, before leaving to work for one year at the new Royal School of Church Music.

He then moved to St Just in Penwith, Cornwall, where he had a position of church organist and let holiday rooms in a cottage he shared with Marcus Tippett. One of their guests was the writer and editor Edward Garnett. At this time, Baker wrote his first novel, The Twisted Tree, which was afterwards published in 1935 by Peter Davies.

On the death of Marcus Tippett, Baker moved to the New Forest, but soon returned to Cornwall to work as an organist for Bernard Walke at the church of St Hilary in Penwith, where he helped Walke in his productions of the first religious plays broadcast live on BBC radio.

Baker's second novel, The Birds, was published by Peter Davies in 1936. In his autobiography I Follow but Myself Baker stated that it bore some resemblance to The Terror by Arthur Machen (first published 1917). When Alfred Hitchcock's The Birds was released in 1963, ostensibly based on a short story "The Birds" (1952) by Daphne du Maurier, Baker considered pursuing litigation against Universal Studios but eventually decided against doing so because legal counsel considered that the works were substantially different. The opinion states: "The treatment of the general idea of attacks by birds in the two works is as different as it could be."

Du Maurier denied that she had taken the idea of Baker's novel for her own short story or that she had ever read the book. Any subsequent doubt on this point arose from the fact that Du Maurier was Davies's cousin. He was said to have been very excited about Baker's novel, and it is reasonable to suppose he might have mentioned it to Du Maurier. Some sources state that Du Maurier was working as a reader for Davies in 1936. This is not true – she was already a successful author by then – and spent almost all of 1936 in Alexandria with her soldier husband and young daughter. Some elements of Baker's story appear to have parallels in Hitchcock's film but it is not clear that the film's scriptwriter, Evan Hunter, was aware of Baker's work. By the time the film script was written, the novel was 26 years old. It had not been remotely successful – selling no more than 350 copies in total.

Baker's Miss Hargreaves (1940) was his most successful novel. It is a comic fantasy in which a fictional character comes to life. He later adapted it as a stage play, which was produced in London at the Royal Court Theatre Club with Dame Margaret Rutherford in the starring role. There have been two broadcast adaptations – one by Baker in 1950 (BBC TV) and one by Brian Sibley in 1989 (for radio). A television opera, ' The Spur of the Moment ', based on the novel, was composed by Guy Halahan with a libretto by Joe Mendoza and broadcast by the BBC in 1959.

Baker became a professional actor and during World War II he toured Britain with Dame Sybil Thorndike, Lewis Casson (whom he understudied) and Paul Scofield.

In 1943, he married Kathleen Lloyd, with whom he had three children: Jonathan, Llewellyn, and Josephine. For 18 months, he was the pianist for the Players' Theatre, accompanying performers such as Leonard Sachs and Hattie Jacques.

In 1954, Baker wrote Lease of Life – which was made into a film by Ealing Studios (also 1954) starring Robert Donat.

Baker's 1956 novel Talk of the Devil (set in Zennor, Cornwall) includes a character, Nathanael Sylvester, transparently based on Aleister Crowley. The Crowleyan connections in this novel are explored in Paul Newman's 2005 book The Tregerthern Horror.

Baker wrote further novels and short stories, and articles in publications such as The Guardian, Radio Times and Life and Letters. He worked as a script editor and wrote plays for BBC. In 1968, his memoir I follow but Myself was published, in which he recalled the friends who had most affected him throughout his life.

In 1969–1970, he spent time in the United States as Artist-in-Residence at the University of Oklahoma.

During their marriage, Baker and his wife moved several times – from Hampstead to Mevagissey, to Surrey, to Perran Downs (Cornwall), to Cardiff, and to Kidderminster. They settled finally in Cornwall at Porthleven. In 1982, Baker died in Porthleven, of cancer.

== Bibliography ==
Novels

- The Twisted Tree (1935)
- The Birds (1936) reissued in 2013 by Valancourt Books with an introduction by Ken Mogg.
- Miss Hargreaves (1940)
- Allanayr (1941) published as Full Score in the USA
- Sweet Chariot (1942)
- Playing With Punch (1944)
- Mr Allenby Loses the Way (1945)
- Before I Go Hence (1946)
- Embers (1946)
- The Downs So Free (1948)
- My Friend the Enemy (1948)
- Blessed Are They (1951)
- Lease of Life (1954)
- Talk of the Devil (1956)
- Teresa: A Journey Out of Time (1961)

Collections

- Stories of the Strange and Sinister (1983)

Non fiction / Autobiographical

- The Road Was Free (1948)
- I Follow But Myself (1968)
- The Call of Cornwall (1976)
