= Armed with Madness =

1928 novel by Mary Butts

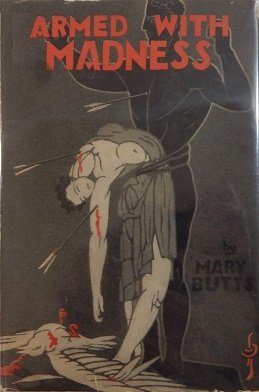
- First edition (US)
- Author: Mary Butts
- Language: English
- Genre: Modernist
- Publisher: Wishart & Co (UK); Albert & Charles Boni (US)
- Publication date: 1928
- Publication place: United Kingdom
- Media type: Print (hardback & paperback)
- ISBN: 0-929701-18-6 (McPherson Paperback Reprint in 'The Taverner Novels')

Armed with Madness is a novel by Mary Butts first published in 1928 that incorporates Modernism and Psychoanalytical Criticism.

A variation on the grail myth, concerned with ritualism and the relationships of a group of young bohemians living in rural isolation on the south-west coast of England, it is recognized as Mary Butts's most significant contribution to literary modernism, and has been called a "masterpiece of Modernist prose".

== Plot summary ==
Five friends are staying at a remote cottage in the Cornish countryside, where they’re joined by an American. While helping clean out a local well, the six discover an ancient cup buried within. This cup seems to have a long and mysterious history—could it even be the fabled Holy Grail? Investigating the cup’s identity soon ignites simmering tensions among the group of uneasy “friends” as their personalities, desires, fears, and hopes begin to clash.

== Publication history ==
Completed in 1927, the novel was first published in the 1928 edition, by Wishart & Co, London, with three engraved plates by Jean Cocteau. It has since been reprinted several times, recently by McPherson, with Butts's 1932 novel The Death of Felicity Taverner, as The Taverner Novels in its 1992 and 1998 editions, incorporating an introduction by Paul West. It was published singly as a Penguin Modern Classic in 1998.
