= Bernard Walke =

English Anglican priest

- Born: Nicolo Bernard Walke; 15 June 1874; Vicarage, Redlynch, Wiltshire
- Died: 25 June 1941 (aged 67); Mevagissey
- Other name: Ber Walke
- Occupation: Anglican priest
- Known for: BBC Plays, St Hilary controversy

Bernard Walke, born Nicolo Bernard Walke (1874–1941), was an English Anglican priest. Most of his ministry was in three Cornish parishes; he was parish priest of St Hilary from 1913 to 1936.

== Personal life ==
Bernard Walke was the eldest of three sons of a Tractarian clergyman who was vicar of Redlynch in Wiltshire.

Walke married artist Anne Fearon in 1911. The couple were described by Newlyn School artist Laura Knight:

They were both long and thin, and Ber always wore dandy silk socks – he was not in the least like a parson to look at. A man with ideals that he lived up to – he was big-hearted enough to understand anyone and had it in him to enjoy vulgar fun as much as any. After we became intimate we often went to stay with the Walkes at St Hilary, as simple as any monastery in its furnishings.

Walke was described as "a monastic looking man" and his dress was unusual; it included a long black cloak and a hat somewhat resembling a sombrero. For transport he used a donkey shay. In 1932 he had two horses (one given him by A. J. Munnings) and a pony. The pair had no children. After Walke had resigned his living in 1936 the couple settled in Mevagissey at The Battery. Bernard died on 25 June 1941 and was buried in the churchyard of Lelant, Cornwall. Annie Walke died in 1965 and was buried in St Erth churchyard, Cornwall, site unknown.

== Early positions ==
Walke became a curate at St Ives, Cornwall; after some years he moved to Polruan also as a curate. He remained at Polruan for eight years and both there and at St Ives became familiar with the life of fishermen.

== St Hilary Church ==
Bernard Walke was appointed St Hilary Church's vicar in 1912 but was not instituted to the living until 1913; he resigned in 1936.

Father Walke was a High Churchman and the changes in services which he introduced were strange to the members of the congregation. Many came in the early days to marvel at the curious goings on in a communion service unlike the morning prayer to which they were accustomed. However this did not persist and many became hostile and stayed away while others remained faithful worshippers. The open air services he held late on Sundays on the Downs were however popular. W. H. Frere, Bishop of Truro, 1923–35, approved of many aspects of Walke's ministry but their views differed on reservation of the blessed sacrament: the bishop held that it was within his authority while Walke maintained it was inherent in that of a parish priest.

=== Plays ===
Walke wrote his first play, Bethlehem (a Nativity play), in the early 1920s; it was performed at Christmas by a cast of parishioners for an audience drawn from St Hilary and neighbouring parishes. In 1927 it was broadcast by the British Broadcasting Corporation. Walke produced the first religious plays for a live broadcast on BBC radio. Assisting him was Frank Baker, an author and the church organist. The idea came from Filson Young who was the producer of the broadcast play The Western Land which Walke also wrote.

=== Artwork ===
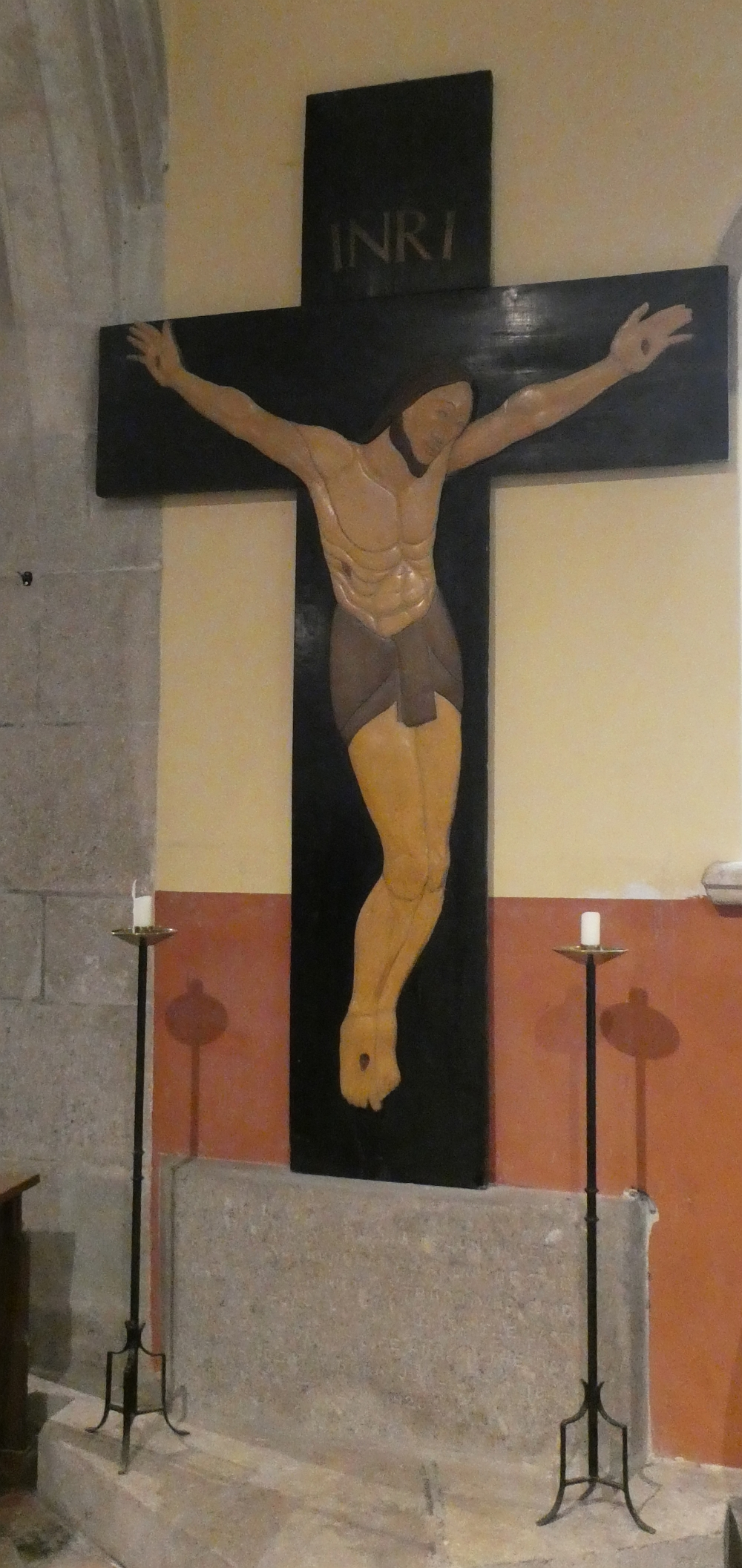
Crucifix by Phyllis "Pog" Yglesias

Built in 1853, St Hilary church lacked interior decoration. The first church was first built during the Middle Ages.

Annie Walke was a member of the Newlyn School, an artist colony in the Newlyn area of Cornwall. Works by Annie and some of their artist friends were commissioned to decorate the church, which included altarpieces, panels and other works. Some of the works depicted the lives of saints from Cornwall. One of Annie's works for the church was a Joan of Arc painting that was placed just inside the south door of the church. Ernest Procter made a work that depicts St Mawes, St Kevin and St Neot for the pulpit and a reredos of the Altar of the Dead. Annie, Dod and Ernest Procter, Gladys Hynes, Alethea and Norman Garstin and Harold Knight all made paintings for the sides of the stalls in the church. Pog Yglesias made the north wall's crucifix and nearby is a reredos by Roger Fry. 12-year-old Joan Manning-Sanders made the painted pictures for a chancel screen. The church "became one of the most notable shrines in the country."

Anglican priest and author H. Miles Brown wrote of the transformation:

His church had been gradually enriched with painted choir stalls, pictures, statues and several altars of stone. Its appearance was neither exactly Roman, nor medieval, but largely sui generis, every ornament and gift the result of love.

The transformation of the church and the publicity which came from the broadcasting of the plays was not the liking of a group of parishioners including Anna Maria King (their leader) and Poynter Adams. They applied to the consistory court for the removal of some items of church furnishing. The court's judgement ordered the removal of some of the items and the discontinuing of some of the customs and ceremonies about which complaints had been made. However Walke felt unable to recognise the right of such a court to determine matters spiritual since appeals could be made to a secular court so ignored the judgement. Reacting to this a large group of extreme Protestant agitators broke into the church on 8 August 1932, and removed or destroyed many of the fittings and furnishings. The damage was caused by an ad hoc group of Protestants from Plymouth and elsewhere including Anna Maria King and John Kensit (a Protestant propagandist from London). They allowed Walke to enter the church and to remove the blessed sacrament from the tabernacle.

Because of his close association with artists in the area, Walke's book Twenty Years at St Hilary is often used to research information about Cornwall artists.

== Unemployment relief ==
In the years immediately after the end of the First World War Walke became concerned about the large numbers of unemployed Cornish miners who were unable to find work. With Gerard Collier he organised prayer meetings for out-of-work miners at the Friends' Meeting House in Redruth. The majority of the miners were also Methodists; after the prayer meeting they discussed the prospects of reviving the mining industry. From these meetings a plan to rebuild the industry on a Christian basis was put forward by Walke, Collier and a number of others who saw an opportunity to strengthen the place of religion in society. The support of the various Christian denominations in Cornwall was obtained and a disused mine at Scorrier which had closed fifty years earlier was acquired. Sufficient capital was accumulated to finance exploratory work at the mine which would enable a decision on its viability to be made and fifty miners joined the Communion of the Ring in Cornwall at a service of dedication conducted by the Bishop of Truro and ministers of other denominations. Three months later the engineer reported favourably on the exploratory work and it was hoped to raise enough capital to continue from a group in London who had made their decision to invest conditional on the support of the project by the Bishop of Truro and two others in Cornwall. However the third of these declined his support because he knew of a forthcoming government plan for road-making intended to relieve unemployment. At this point the project had to be abandoned.

== St Hilary Children's Home ==
The St Hilary Children's Home for boys and girls was established in the Jolly Tinners building (at that time a disused public house). The home was founded and managed by Walke and his wife, Annie. It was set up under the auspices of Holy Family Homes, developed by Father Alban Henry Baverstock.

Boys and girls were transferred in 1939 to Walsingham in Norfolk after St Hilary's Church had been targeted by anti-Catholic protesters.

Walke gives an account of the home in chapter 18 "The Jolly Tinners" of his Twenty Years at St Hilary. At the time he wrote (while in the sanatorium at Tehidy) the home had been open for ten years. It was planned to have five boys and five girls cared for by a matron. It was the refounding of a previously existing home which had been established by a woman who after two years intended to close it. Influenced by his experience of seeing neglected and delinquent children brought before the juvenile court in Shoreditch, Walke, assisted by Father Rogers (Vicar of Penzance) and Mrs. T. B. Bolitho, refounded the home: the four children from the previous home were admitted. Some of the children were sent there from Shoreditch and Clerkenwell under orders of the court. The first broadcast of Walke's Christmas play by the BBC was followed by an appeal for funds for the home (the "Cornish Home for London Children"); in the following weeks he received thousands of letters with some contribution to its funds. In some cases further contributions were sent after later broadcasts.

== Later life and legacy ==
In November 1932 Walke fell ill with influenza and did not conduct any services until Christmas Day. However, on St Stephen's Day (26 December) he again became ill and his illness was diagnosed as tuberculosis; he was then moved to the sanatorium at Tehidy and eventually recovered. His recollections Twenty Years at St Hilary were written while in Hut 10 of the sanatorium. and published in 1935. He dedicated it to his wife, whom he refers to in the text as "Annie Walke". Different chapters cover his various interest as well as the story of his ministry at St Hilary; e.g. "Donkeys", "Brethren of the Common Table". On returning to the parish he added an epilogue looking forward to a few more years.

Canon A. M. Allchin observed in the introduction to the Truran edition of "Twenty Years" that in the last ten years of his life Walke was affected by his poor health and a sense of failure of his hopes. He is however still well remembered at St Hilary, more than anything for the plays which had made such a national impact and even more on those who were involved in the productions. Though Walke might appear a man of the past (for example in his hopes that the Church of England would return whole-heartedly to Catholicism) in other ways he looks forward (for example in his hopes for peace between nations and social equity).

== Publications ==
- Bernard Walke. Twenty Years at St. Hilary. Anthony Mott; 1935 (first edition). ISBN 978-0-907746-04-1. (Note: There were five editions made of Walke's book. 1) 1935 Methuen & Co. Ltd (OCLC 1895567) ISBN 978-0-907746-04-1, 2) 1936 printed in London Open Library OL13718577M, 3) 1982 published by Anthony Mott in London. Open Library OL16217554M 4) 2002 Paperback Introduction by A. M. Allchin. Mount Hawke: Truran, 2002. ISBN 9781850221647 OCLC 54789914 5) 2002 Hardback ISBN 9781850221708 OCLC Open Library OL11919248M)
- Bernard Walke. Plays from St. Hilary. London: Faber and Faber. Open Library OL19932186M. (Note: Includes three plays: The upper chamber. The Eve of All Souls. The stranger at St. Hilary.)
