= St Hilary's Church, St Hilary, Cornwall =

Church in Cornwall, England

Coordinates: 50.1311°N 5.4288°W

St Hilary Church, St Hilary
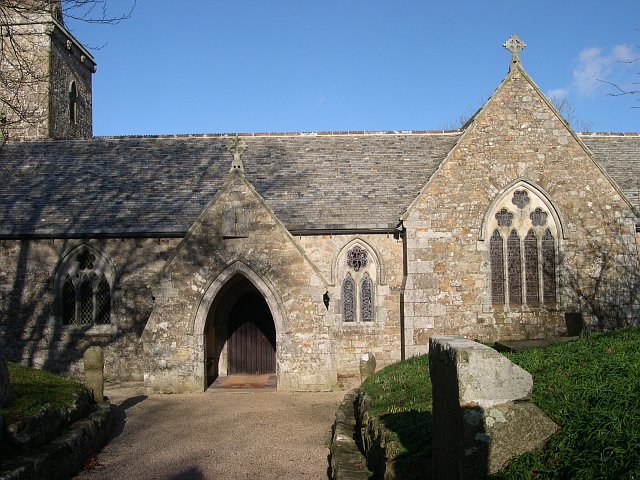
- St Hilary Church, St Hilary
- Denomination: Church of England
- Churchmanship: High Church

History
- Dedication: St Hilary of Poitiers

Administration
- Province: Canterbury
- Diocese: Truro
- Archdeaconry: Cornwall
- Deanery: Penwith
- Parish: St Hilary, Cornwall

Clergy
- Priest: Father Jeff Risbridger
- Location within Cornwall

Listed Building – Grade I
- Official name: Church of Saint Hilary
- Designated: 10 June 1954
- Reference no.: 1310334

The Church of St Hilary is an Early English–style church in the village of St Hilary, Cornwall, England. It features a 13th-century tower. Following a fire in 1853, the remainder of the church was rebuilt two years later by William White. The church is dedicated to Saint Hilary of Poitiers and is a Grade I listed building. The architecture is described in Pevsner's Buildings of England: Cornwall.

== Antiquities ==
A Roman milestone was found in the foundations of the church in 1854, and it is now fixed in the south aisle. The inscription, Imp Caes Flav Val Constantino Pio nob Caes divi Constanti Pii F[el] Aug[usti] filio, refers to the Roman emperor Constantine the Great (Collingwood (1965) RIB no. 2233). The churchyard contains both British and Roman crosses.

There is a Cornish cross in the churchyard; it has a Latin cross on both sides. There is another cross on Trewhela Lane.

== 20th century and after ==
=== Newlyn School artists' works ===
Bernard "Ber" Walke was made Vicar of St Hilary in 1912; he was the priest from 1913 to 1936. Although the medieval St Hilary Church was rebuilt in 1853, it lacked interior decoration. Annie Walke, the vicar's wife, and some of the couple's artist friends from the "Lamorna Group" of the Newlyn School were commissioned to decorate the church with altarpieces, panels and other works. Some of the works depicted the lives of saints from Cornwall.

One of Annie's works for the church was a Joan of Arc painting that was placed just inside the south door of the church. Ernest Procter made a work that depicts St Mawes, St Kevin and St Neot for the pulpit and a reredos of the Altar of the Dead. Annie, Dod and Ernest Procter, Gladys Hynes, Alethea and Norman Garstin and Harold Knight all made paintings for the sides of the stalls in the church. Phyllis ("Pog") Yglesias made the north wall's crucifix and nearby is Roger Fry's reredos. 12-year-old Joan Manning Saunders made the painted pictures for a chancel screen.

=== Damage and restoration ===
The parish became notorious in the 1930s after extreme Protestant agitators broke into the church on 8 August 1932, and removed or destroyed many of the fittings and furnishings that had been installed by the much-loved Father Bernard Walke (vicar of St. Hilary from 1912 to 1936). The damage was caused by an ad hoc group of Protestants from Plymouth and elsewhere. More recently, some of these have been restored, and the devotional Anglo-Catholic atmosphere has been reinstated.

The church continues to fundraise to maintain the fabric and is hoping to be able to restore the bells which are currently awaiting repair.

== St Hilary Heritage Centre ==
The church houses the St Hilary Heritage Centre beneath the school room, with displays about local history dating back to the Roman era. Exhibits include mining, emigration, Newlyn School paintings, Cornish language and the history of the church. The Heritage Centre tells the fascinating story of St Hilary with its historic links to St Michael's Mount. It has a rich and celebrated history from pre-historic times to the present day. The church has unique links with West Cornwall's literary and artistic heritage particularly the Newlyn Artists. The Procters, Harveys, Knights, Garstins and Walkes were all involved in the unique scheme of decoration of the church which has led to its Grade I listing. Open from May to end of September on Wednesdays 11.00 am to 4.00 pm
