= Saint Neot (monk) =

9th-century Christian monk and saint

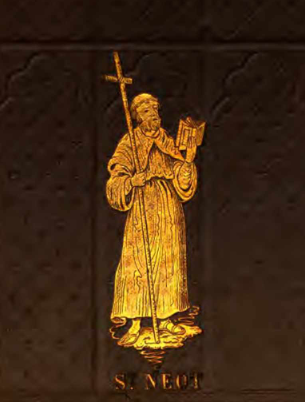
- Saint Neot

Hermit, Monk
- Died: 31 July 877
- Venerated in: Roman Catholic Church; Anglican Communion; Eastern Orthodox Church
- Major shrine: St Neot, Cornwall (original); St Neots Priory (destroyed)
- Feast: 31 July
- Patronage: Patron saint of Fish

Neot (died 31 July 877) was an English monk. Born in the first half of the ninth century, he lived as a monk at Glastonbury Abbey. He preferred to perform his religious devotions privately, and he later went to live an isolated life in Cornwall, near the village now called St Neot. His wisdom and religious dedication earned him admiration from the monks. He visited the Pope in Rome, who instructed him to found a monastery in Cornwall.

He did so, and because of his devotional qualities, he became famous, and attracted large numbers of pilgrims, and with them money. A number of miracles are said to have taken place involving him. Neot died on 31 July 877. His remains were kept at the monastery he had founded, and they attracted considerable numbers of pilgrims.

About 975 AD a monastery was founded at Eynesbury (in what is now the town of Saint Neots), and in order to increase the lucrative visits of pilgrims, Neot's remains were abstracted from Cornwall without permission, and lodged at Eynesbury. The anticipated public attention followed, and the district around the priory and monastery became known as St Neots: that is the name of the chief town there now. Controversy arose later as to whether Neot's remains were truly at the Priory, but this was confirmed by Anselm, the Prior of the French Abbey of our Lady of Bec, in Normandy, which was the superior institution to Eynesbury and St Neots after the Norman Conquest. Anselm took Neot's jawbone back to Bec.

During the reign of King Henry VIII, the Dissolution of the Monasteries took place and the priory and monastery at St Neots were probably destroyed. No further report is made of the location of Neot's remains to this day. He is remembered by the names of the town of St Neots and the Cornish village of St Neot; the parish church of Poundstock in Cornwall was also dedicated to him until 1970. The parish church in St Neot has a medieval stained glass window depicting the miracles. His feast day is 31 July.

== Early life ==
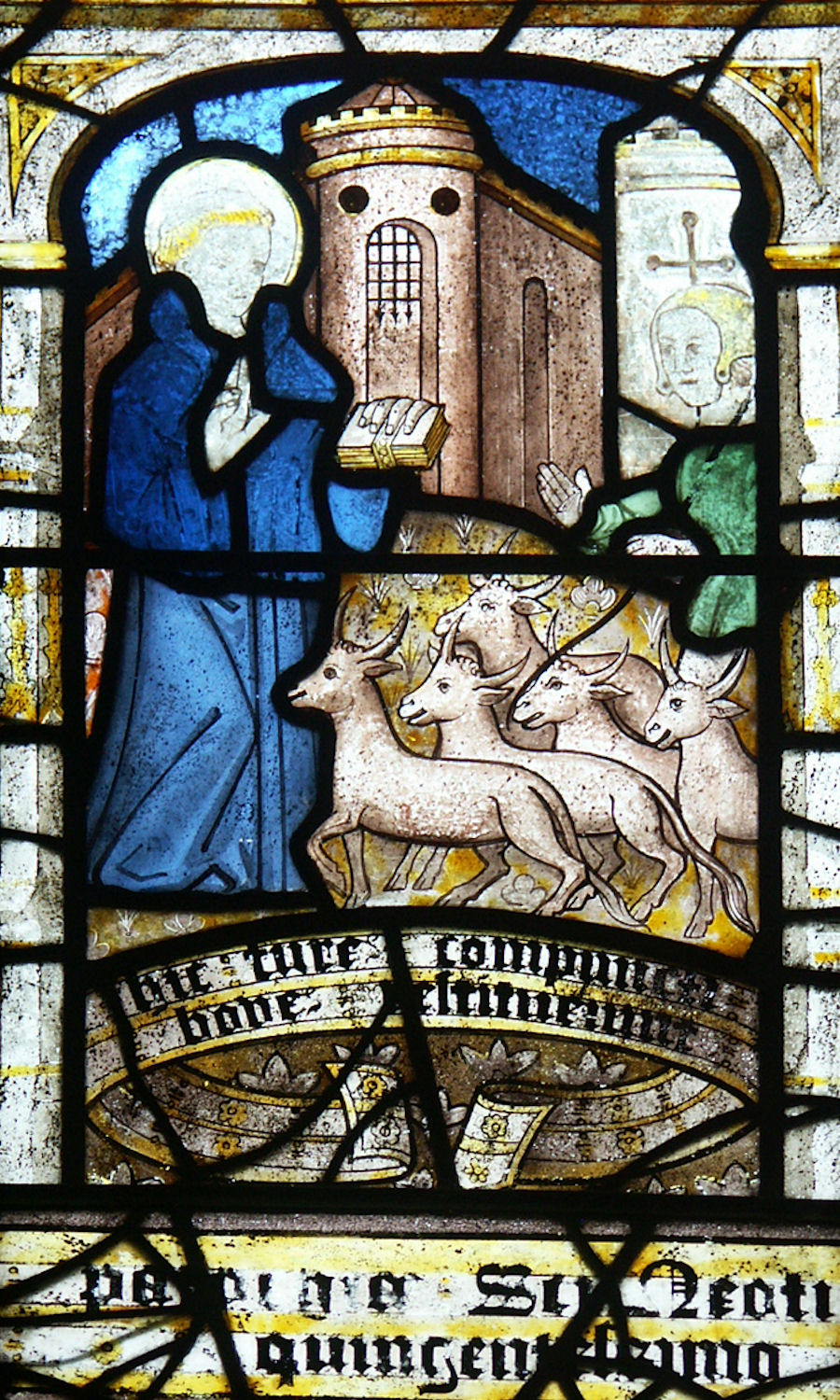
St Neot, as depicted on a stained-glass window at the village of St Neot, Cornwall

Neot was born into a minor branch of the West Saxon royal house, in the first half of the ninth century, somewhere in Wessex. (Note: Whitaker says that Neot was the brother of King Alfred, but this is not generally supported. Whitaker had committed himself with the title of his book.) Neot's father was named Ethelwulph. (Note: Various writers have spelt this Fidulf, Eldulf, Edulph and Adulph.) In early life he was under pressure to become a soldier, but when he was old enough, he devoted himself instead to a religious life. As a young man therefore, he became a novice monk, living in Glastonbury Abbey, about the middle of the ninth century. He was extremely studious.

He is likely to have been given an Anglo-Saxon name by his parents, but this is not recorded. The word neophyte was commonly used at the time for individuals who had newly undertaken religious vows, and Gorham speculates that he might have been called "Neophytus", the Latin form of neophyte, at the monastery by monks who noticed his application to religiosity. In time, this might have been abbreviated to "Neotus", the Latin form of the name by which we know him now.

He was admired for his literary attainments by the other monks; and he was known for his humility and religious devotion. In addition to the religious observances prescribed by the monastery, he often awoke in the middle of the night and went to the chapel secretly to pray, in the disguise of a penitent, returning at dawn to continue the ordinary monastic routine. In due course he was admitted to Holy orders, and later he was made Sacristan of the Abbey. The fame of his scholarship and devotion attracted many pilgrims from all parts of the country, who went to Glastonbury to receive the benefit of his wisdom.

It was while he was at Glastonbury that the miracle of the door lock, described below, took place.

== Becoming a hermit ==
Neot's wish to do his additional devotional prayer privately shows that he wanted to avoid deriving pleasure from the approval of others. As Gorham puts it, "Under a strong feeling of the danger of popular applause, he determined to retire from this public station, and to lead the life of an anchoret in some less frequented spot". An anchoret (or anchorite) is someone who retires from ordinary life, and lives in seclusion for religious reasons.

Neot travelled from Glastonbury to live near a remote village in Cornwall; at the time the village was known as Hamstoke. The location Neot chose was surrounded by dense woodland in hilly terrain. Neot took with him one man, named Barius, as a servant. He spent seven years at this place; despite his wish to avoid public attention, the tiny community of Hamstoke became known as Neotstoke or Neot-stow during this time. (Note: In a footnote on page 46, Gorham says that the name Neot-Stoke was only adopted after Neot's death. A possible explanation is that the name Neotstoke was used by pilgrims going to see him, but was only adopted by local people later.) He lived as if he was a novice in religion; he macerated his body by fastings, by watchings, by prayers, because he had not lived hitherto in any hermitical strictness.

When seven years had passed, Neot visited the Pope in Rome, to seek instructions about his future. He evidently intended to withdraw further from the world, but the Pope dissuaded him from that course, and told him to return to Cornwall and to "scatter the word of God among the people". Neot returned to where he had been living and founded a monastery there, (Note: The monastery was referred to at the time as a convent; the word referred to holy establishments for either sex.) and gathered together some religious men, over whom he was made Abbot.

== King Alfred's visits ==
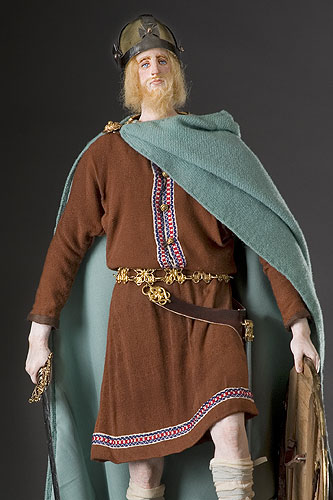
Alfred the Great as imagined by George S Stuart

King Alfred is said to have been a frequent visitor to Hamstoke (or Neotstoke) where Neot had withdrawn from his celebrity status at Glastonbury. In the year 867, Alfred was on a hunting expedition in the area; he turned aside to the Church at Ham-Stoke, where St Guerir (Note: Guerir's name is spelt in many different ways by different writers, including Gueryr.) was in residence. Alfred remained there for some time prostrate in prayer, imploring freedom from some severe disease with which he was afflicted. When he left, it was not long before the King was free of the illness. This was believed to be as a result of the holiness of the place in which his prayers had been offered. Neot seems not to have been in residence at the time of this visit by Alfred, and Whitaker says that the cure of Alfred's illness prompted Neot's adoption of the place as his residence.

Later, when Neot was installed as Abbot, Alfred made several visits. Neot is said to have repeatedly rebuked the King for his unbridled ambition. He warned that Alfred might expect greater misfortunes from the Danish (Viking) invasions. Alfred had failed, Neot said, to attend to his people's complaints and petitions.

== Neot's death ==
After his journey to Rome and his return to Neotstoke, Neot now remained there for the rest of his life. In the year 877 he became ill with a progressive illness described as "languor" and sensing the approach of death, he took the holy communion.

Having refreshed his spirit by a participation of the emblems of his Saviour's death, like a faithful shepherd he addressed his own little flock. He exhorted them to live in peace, and spoke much of the means by which the salvation of the soul might be promoted. He then committed his soul to the mercy of the Almighty, and (stretching forth his hands towards heaven) breathed out his spirit in the midst of psalmody [the singing of psalms] and prayers.

He died on 31 July 877.

31 July is widely quoted as his Saint's Day.

However Skeat gives his day as October 28. and Saunders explains:

That was the date of his death and his "principal festival"; "Afterwards his festival was observed on October 28th, the day of the translation of his relics from Cornwall into Huntingdonshire, and he is still venerated on that day in the calendar of the Universal Church.

He was buried in the Church which he himself had built, upon the site of the more ancient Chapel dedicated to St Guerir. Seven years later, a larger and more appropriate building had been made by the monks of Neotstoke, and Neot's body was reinterred at the north side of the altar.

Whitaker had written that "When Neot died he was buried at the monastery. About sixty years after his death, about the year 936, his remains were taken inside, at first to a side-chapel, and then to the nave, while much of the monastery and the accompanying church were demolished and rebuilt." but Gorham, writing later, decidedly contradicts that.

The monastery that Neot had founded declined in importance after his death, and in fact the lands were later seized by the Earl of Morton. It is likely that in the reign of William the Conqueror the building was demolished entirely. No trace of it remains, nor is the location known.

== Eynesbury Priory founded and Neot's remains transferred there ==
About the year 975 a priory was founded in Eynesbury, close to the River Great Ouse in what is now Huntingdonshire. A nobleman and landowner named Leofric (alternatively Earl Alric) and his wife Leofleda (alternatively Countess Ethelfleda) were the creators of the priory on their land. (Note: Tebbutt calls them Leofric and Leoflaed, and the settlement Ernulph's Bury.) It was essential to add prestige and status to their new priory; the objective was to attract pilgrims, and their money. This meant selecting a notable holy person as their patron, and Neot was their choice. The commercial possibilities would be even greater if some physical relics could be acquired, and legend has it that Leofric and Leofleda decided to acquire those of Neot. Legend continues that Neot's bones were stolen from Cornwall, and brought to Eynesbury where they were placed in a shrine at the priory.

The priory structure was wooden, located in what is now St Neots, but at that time was considered to be part of Eynesbury. (Note: Several writers believe the location to have been near the present-day Waitrose supermarket, but Young believes it was near the crossroads formed by Cambridge Street and Huntingdon Street.) The locality already had a small population.

The official Warden of Neot's shrine secretly decamped from Cornwall with the treasure with which he had been entrusted. He left Neot-Stoke on St Andrew's day, 30 November, he reached Eynesbury on 7 December. Neot's remains were kept in the residence of Earl Alric at Eynesbury for a short time, as the Priory had not yet been constructed. The year of this event seems not to have been recorded, but must have been several years after Neot's death in 877 AD and well before the presumed destruction of the Eynesbury priory by the Danes in 1010 AD.

Stevenson in reviewing the work of other historians states in passing, "The date of the transference [of the relics] was, however, not 974, [as had been suggested] but about 1000."

Returning to events at the time:

In the meantime, the inhabitants of Neot-Stoke, having understood that the Warden was missing, and having suspected the fraud, flocked to the Shrine of their Saint to inspect the sacred Chest. On finding that their invaluable treasure was gone, they were filled with self-reproach at their own carelessness, and with indignation at the infidelity of their servant. Having armed themselves with such weapons as they could procure, they sought the fugitive among the neighbouring woods, hills and valleys. After much waste of time and fruitless labor, having obtained information respecting the road by which he had fled, a party of the principal inhabitants traced him to Eynesbury.

Restoration of the stolen property having been in vain demanded, their rage became excessive. From bribes and threats, they were about to proceed to violence; and blood would have been shed, had not the royal authority interposed to quell this disturbance.

King Edgar sided with Leofric and Leofleda, and actually sent soldiers to ensure that the Cornishmen went home, empty-handed. (Note: Edgar died in 975 AD.)

== Eynesbury Priory ==
Gorham says

No sooner were the remains of Neot safely deposited at Eynesbury, than Earl Alric raised over them a Chapel, and converted the palace of Earl Elfrid into a Monastery which was dedicated to the Saint... In honor of the Saint the name of the place was changed to Neots-bury.

The chapel and monastery were located on the east bank of the River Great Ouse, on the north side of the present-day town of St Neots. The priory was located in the space between the present-day Priory Lane and Tan Yard, on the bank of the River Great Ouse.

The chapel at the Priory was soon consecrated in the presence of Ethelwolde, Bishop of Winchester, Æscwin, Bishop of Lincoln, Brithnod, Abbot of Ely, Earl Ægelwin, Ædric Pope, Ædelm Polga and many others. Earl Alric and Lady Ethelfleda entreated Abbot Brithnod and Bishop Æscwin that the foundation would have their protection, and that they would furnish it with monks. This was agreed to, and a Benedictine foundation was created, monks being sent from Ely and Thorney. Some land was given to the foundation, most of which was at Waresley and Gamlingay.

== Removal of the relics ==
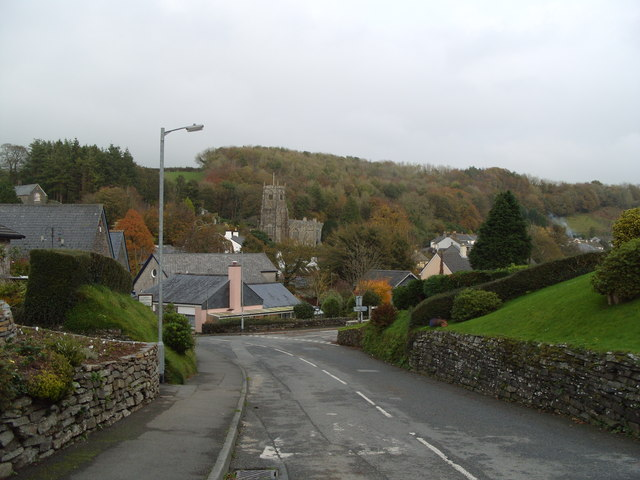
View of St Neot Church, Cornwall

It appeared that the future of the Priory at St Neots, and the remains lodged there, were secure. However after a few years a Danish attack on the area was anticipated, and for safety the relics, that is the remains of Neot, were transferred for safety to a place thought to be less susceptible to Danish attack. Lewina, a lady of Eynesbury and the sister of Osketul, the Abbot of Croyland (now Crowland), arranged for the relics to be taken to her property at Whittlesea. She sent a message to Osketul asking him to come with a force of monks to take the relics to Croyland Abbey. They did so, although at that time the marshy district was almost impenetrable. This event probably took place in 1003. The priory of Neotsbury, that is St Neots, was destroyed by the Danes in 1010. They were pagans and had no scruples about destroying religious relics. It is not known whether the Danes attempted the destruction of the first priory, but Young says that if they did so, the buildings were either repaired or rebuilt, since it is recorded that the bones of St Neot had been restored to the priory by 1020.

When peace was restored and Danish incursions were no longer expected, Neot's remains were transferred back to St Neots, where some rebuilding had taken place. The fame and attraction provided by possession of the remains of a saint were so powerful that the monks of Croyland falsely insisted in later years that Neot's remains were still at Croyland. The issue became so contentious that in 1078 or 1079 Bishop Anselm (soon afterwards Archbishop of Canterbury) visited the priory at St Neots and inspected the remains, and announced that they were indeed present there. Nevertheless the Abbot of Croyland continued to claim that his Abbey held them.

A century later, the subsequent Abbot of Croyland continued to claim that the remains were with him there, but widespread doubts were expressed and the chest which was claimed to contain Neot's remains was opened. It was found to contain a skull, the collar bones, the shoulder blades, some bones of the thorax, and the leg bones.

"In 1215 these pretended relics of Neot were removed by the Abbot Henry Longchamp, (Note: Grandson of Henry de Longchamp.) and were placed by an altar erected to his honor... As a proof of the futility of these claims, in 1295 Oliver Bp. of Lincoln issued a second Attestation, reciting the Testimonial of Abp. Anselm." The bones were not those of Neot, he affirmed, and Neot's remains were at St Neots.

== Adoption of the Priory by a French Abbey ==
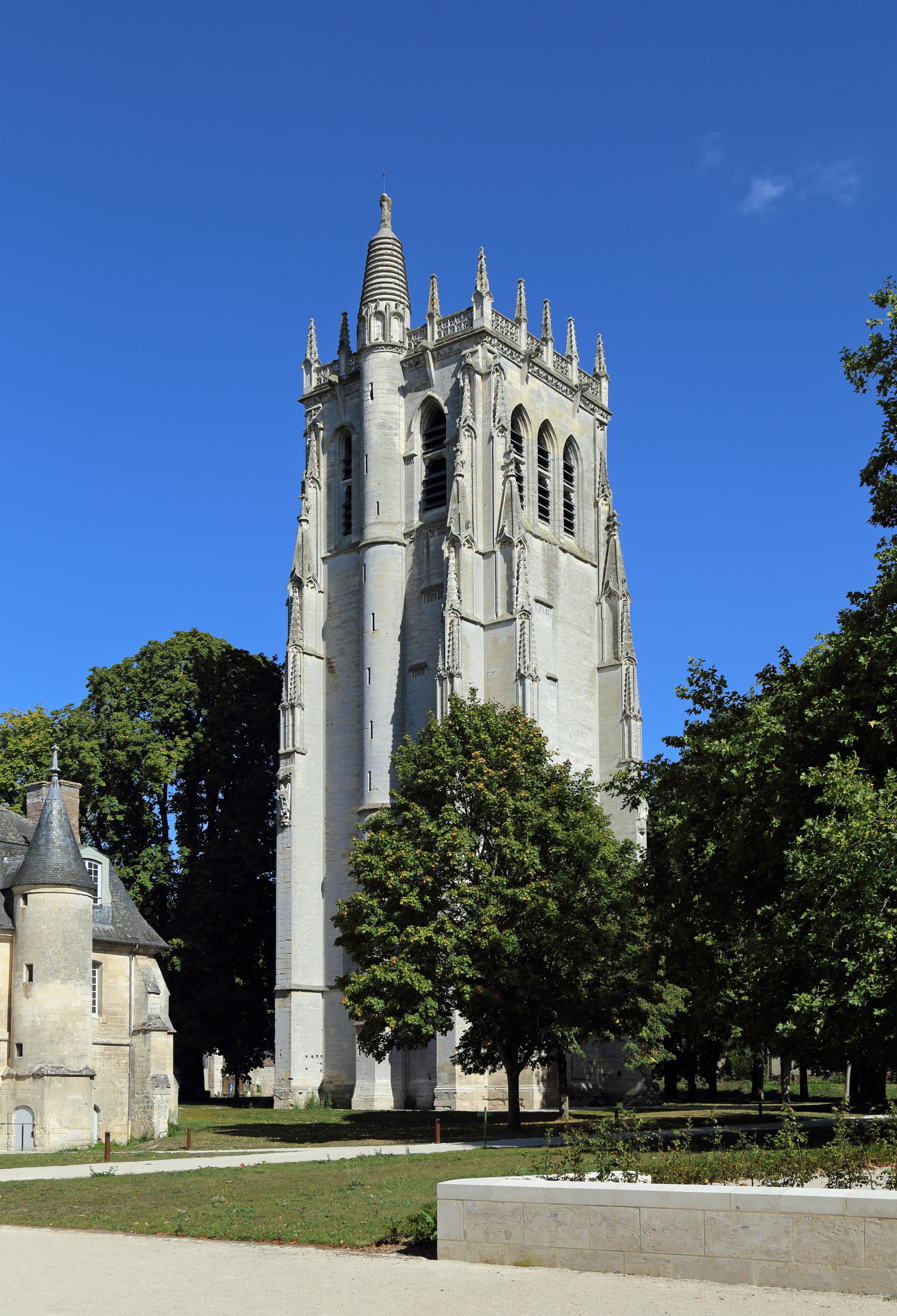
The Abbey of Notre-Dame in Bec, Normandy

The Norman Conquest took place in 1066, and England became subject to the rule of William the Conqueror. This huge change of governance was accompanied by changes in religious authority, and the Priory of St Neots was seized by Gilbert Earl of Owe. The local monks were ejected and French monks installed. The son of Gilbert, Richard fitz Gilbert and his wife Rohaïs were in local control, and sent word to the Abbey of Bec, in Normandy, for monks to be sent; St Neots Priory became subject to the French Abbey. This took place about 1080 and was a most important step, for Bec was one of the leading intellectual and cultural centres of northern Europe.

Once again doubts surfaced about whether Neot's bones were indeed at St Neots Priory, and in 1078 or 1079 the Abbot of Bec came to St Neots to verify the matter. This was in fact Anselm, who had been appointed to the post of Abbot in 1078. (Note: Anselm was actually Italian by birth.) Anselm examined the shrine, which was a portable container called a feretory. Anselm found all of Neot's bones inside, with the exception of one arm, which may have been pilfered by the Monks of Croyland. The bones were once again enclosed in the feretory, with the exception of one minor part, probably Neot's jawbone, which Anselm took with him on his return to Bec. The feretory was locked, and Anselm took the key with him as well.

In 1113 Rohaïs, now a widow, gave all her farmlands ("her entire manor") to the priory and its monks. In 1409 the Priory was removed from the control of the French Abbey in a process called denization. An Englishman, Edward Salisbury was appointed Prior, and only English monks were to be admitted.

== Dissolution of the monasteries ==
King Henry VIII brought about a rupture between the church in England and the Roman Catholic religion, resulting in the first Act of Supremacy of 1534, making Henry supreme authority over the Church of England and rejecting the authority of the Pope. From 1536 Henry instituted a series of processes called the Dissolution of the Monasteries (or Suppression of the Monasteries), in which the lands and property of monasteries were appropriated to the state. There were about 900 religious houses in England at the time.

St Neots Priory was surrendered to the King on 21 December 1539. There were a prior and seven monks in residence. The Priory had no further religious activity.

== Relics of St Neot ==
With the monasteries being dissolved, and the Roman Catholic observances now being disparaged, the remains of Neot seem to have lost their significance. The Priory of St Neots was already in a poor physical condition, and when its associated lands were given by Henry VIII to Sir Richard Williams of Hinchinbrook. (Note: Gorham's spelling; the modern spelling is Hinchingbrooke.) In 1589 the stones in the ruins of the Priory were used for construction of the new bridge over the nearby River Great Ouse. No trace of the existence of the buildings remained.

There is no record of the fate of the shrine (feretory) of St Neot. The jawbone of Neot, taken by Anselm to Bec, was last recorded there in 1680, and it too has been lost.

The writer Leland saw two non-bodily relics at St Neots in 1538: Neot's "interior vest" made of hair-cloth, "in the Irish manner", and a comb used by Neot, "made of a little bone of two fingers' breadth, into which were inserted small fishes' teeth, the whole having the appearance of a pike's jaw."

Young remarks that no-one knows what happened to the bones of St Neot after the Dissolution. They may have been seized and destroyed by King Henry's commissioners, who were ordered to remove all relics and other "superstitious" items from religious houses.

== The Alfred Jewel ==
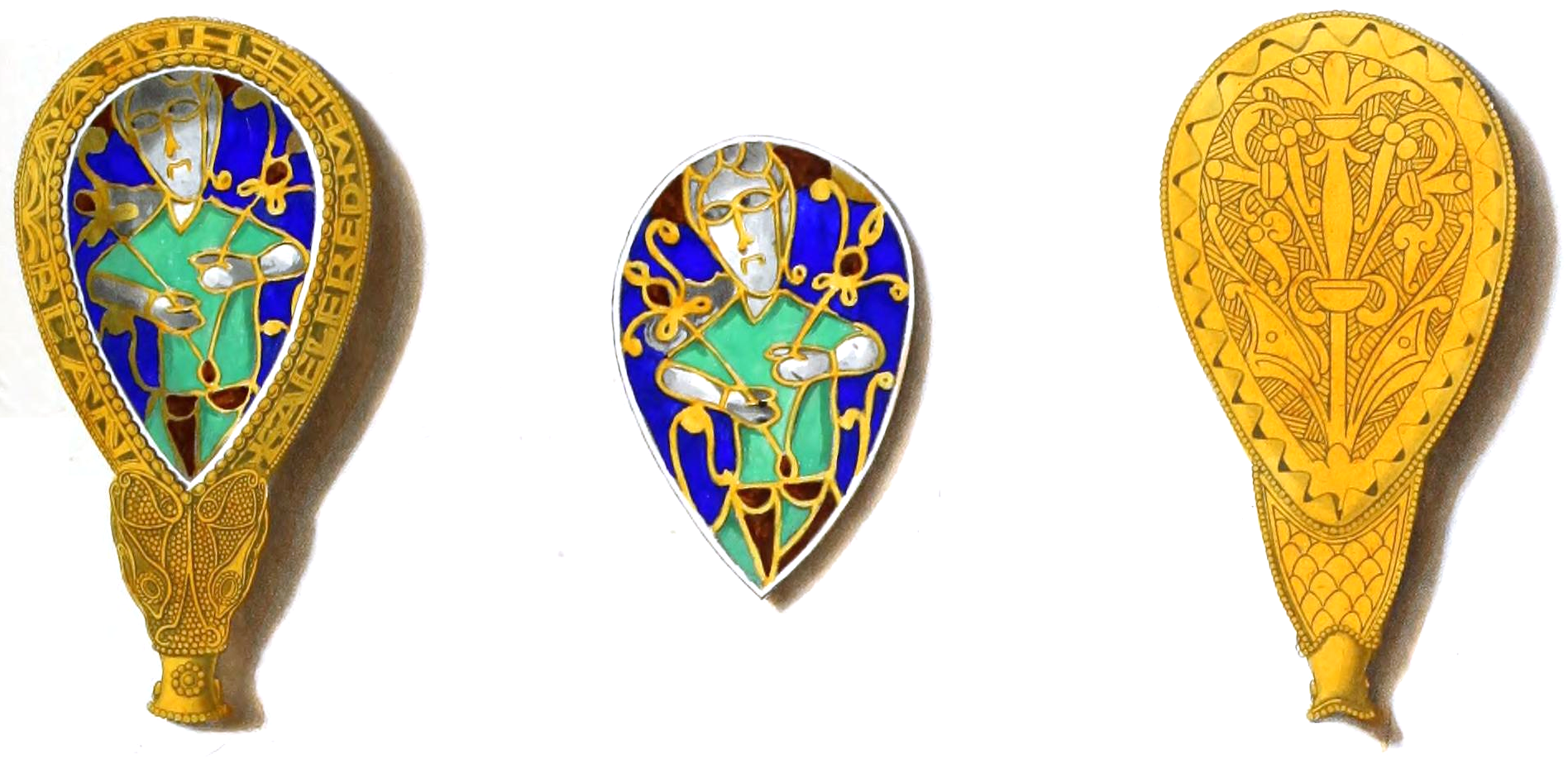
King Alfred’s Jewel—front, enamel, back

The Alfred Jewel was found in 1693 near Athelney in Somerset, close to the area where King Alfred had hidden to escape Viking soldiers in AD 878. The jewel is made of gold with an enamel image under a rock crystal; it is thought to be the end of a pointer used to follow religious text when reading. The Old English inscription reads "Alfred ordered me to be made".

The figure depicted on the jewel was believed to be Saint Neot, and for that reason was adopted as the emblem for the Cambridgeshire town of St Neots. Neot is thought to have carried a palm before King Alfred's soldiers as they went into battle, and the figure seems to be holding a palm. Later studies suggested that it depicts Christ, or alternatively the abstract idea of insight, inspired by the reading of religious works. The jewel is now part of the collection in the Ashmolean Museum, Oxford.

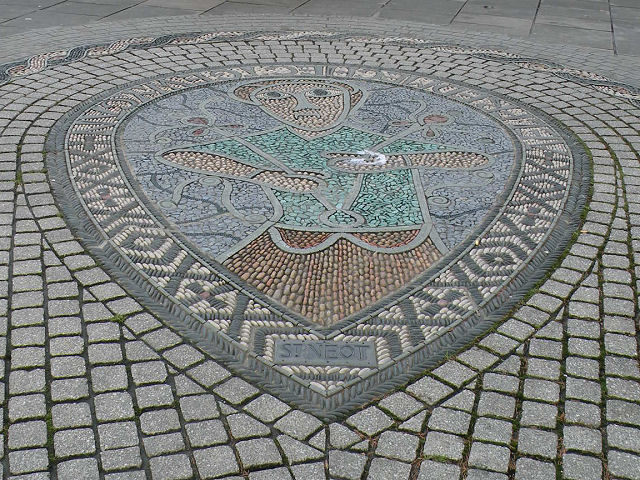
St Neot mosaic

A mosaic based on the design of the jewel is inset into the pavement of the Market Square in the town of St Neots.

== Miracles ==
Neot is said to have been involved in several miraculous events, although these are not universally supported as accurate.

=== The high door lock ===
Neot was small of stature: four feet tall. An important visitor arrived at Glastonbury church, of which Neot was sacrist, responsible for the general management of the building. The visitor knocked loudly, but he had arrived at a time when the occupants, including Neot, were taking a midday nap. Neot was eventually woken by the visitor's knocking, and went to open the door to him. It was approached from within by a step upwards, so that the lock was very high from the place where Neot could stand, and he could not reach it.

He is thus distressed exceedingly, when at last, wonderful to be seen! the lock descends from its height to the level of his monastic sash... the lock remained thus low during a long time afterwards, for a witness to the mighty "miracle", being lowered assuredly in consequence of St. Neot's distress, continuing lowered long after St. Neot was gone...

Whitaker asserts that in reality, Neot fetched an iron stool, enabling him to reach the lock, and left it there for later use. This is how the lock "lowered" for Neot to reach.

Gorham thinks that, afterwards, the door lock was permanently lowered by the more worldly agency of a carpenter:

"The lock was lowered in consequence of St. Neot's distress....... Thus, what was left, as the consequence of a little alteration made, and a memorial of a little event in the life of the Saint, was shaped by the plastic imagination of devotees into the memorial of a miracle that had never been wrought."

A derivative of this fable developed later: there is supposed to be a stone opposite the south porch; Neot stood on it and threw the key towards the door; the key found its way into the keyhole and opened the door for him.

=== The perpetual fishpond ===
The next reported miracle took place at the place in Cornwall where Neot lived as a hermit, with Barius as his servant. God had placed three small fish in a pond nearby. Neot was a vegetarian, but he was told by an angel that he might take one fish daily to eat, but only one. He did so every day, and in the following mornings Neot found that there were still three fish: the fish that had been taken was restored.

Later Neot fell very ill, and in despair his servant Barius decided to take two fishes out of the pond, and prepared them for Neot to eat. He boiled one and broiled (grilled) the other. When he took the cooked fish to Neot, he was alarmed, and told Barius to return them to the water instantly. He did so, and as soon as the fish reached the water they revived and began to swim about.

The language of Gorham, translating an ancient manuscript, is more poetic; when Barius brought him the two fish:

Neot was alarmed, and anxiously inquired whence the two fishes came. Barius told his simple tale. "What hast thou done?" said the Hermit: "Lo! the favor of God deserts us; go instantly and restore these fishes to their element." While Barius was absent at the pool, Neot prostrated himself in earnest prayer, till his servant returned with the intelligence that the fishes were disporting in the water as usual. He again went to the well (continues this fabulous narrative), and took only one fish; which the Hermit had no sooner tasted, than he was restored to perfect health!

=== A fox stole Neot's shoe ===
There is a natural spring a short distance to the west of the church in the Cornish village of St Neot. It is likely that this was the spring habitually used by Neot himself. It formed a small pond at the time, and Neot seems to have bathed in the pond. At the time it was a secluded spot, and Neot liked to pray there, unobserved by others. He may have spoken his prayers while standing in the pond and washing himself. One day he was doing so, when he heard the approach of some horsemen; to avoid making contact with them, he hastened away to the dwelling (Note: Usually referred to as a "cell" but this usage is unfamiliar to many modern readers.) where he lived, to complete his prayers. In his hurry to avoid the horsemen, he shed a sandal, and now he sent Barius to find it.

While Neot was absent from the spring, a fox was passing and discovered the lost shoe, and picked it up and ran off with it. "In order that the Saint might not be scandalized by so mean a thing, the fox was miraculously cast into a deep sleep, and died, having the thongs of the shoe in his vile (Note: "Vile" seems a strong word; at the time when this was written, foxes were considered to be wicked, cunning and sly.) mouth." Barius found the shoe and took it to Neot, who made him promise never to tell the story during Neot's lifetime.

A writer in the Catholic Layman tells us that an angel was involved: when the fox saw the shoe and decided to take it away:

An angel, who loved to hover in hallowed places, and to breathe an atmosphere which was sanctified by the devotions of God's Saints, was present there invisibly and saw this thing, and he would not that such an one as St Neot should be molested even in so small a matter, so that he had sent the sleep of death upon the fox, and Barius when he came there found him dead —- arrested at the instant of his theft —- yet holding the thongs of the shoe in his mouth.

=== The deer pulled the plough ===
Although he had been a hermit, Neot farmed land at the monastery, and he used oxen to pull the plough. One night some thieves came and stole the oxen. There was a great herd of stags near the place and Neot ordered them to be yoked to the plough like oxen, to pull the plough. At the Saint's command, the stags all left their pasture and came to bow their necks under the yoke. They were yoked to the plough and pulled it every day. They returned to their usual pastures in the evening, but came back every morning for another day of ploughing.

The thieves heard of this miracle and went to Neot and asked for forgiveness, which he promptly granted to them. Realising that their life of crime was wicked, they asked to be admitted as monks, and they spent the rest of their lives in prayer. As the oxen had been returned to Neot by the thieves, he commanded the stags to return to their natural life, but their progeny bore a mark recording the event, "a ring of white like a yoke about their necks, and on that part of the neck which used to bear the yoke."

=== Hunting dogs were repelled ===
One day Neot was singing the psalms at the spring, (Note: Some writers say that he did so immersed up to his neck, but this is not supported by serious sources, and hardly seems plausible.) when a doe was being chased by a huntsman's dogs. She came in terror to Neot and lay down at his feet, and by her anxious pantings implored his aid. The pursuing dogs wished to tear her into pieces, and approaching, they showed the signs of their fury in the loudness of their barking. However, when they saw the doe at the feet of St Neot, they ran away, as if they had been struck with a stick or a spear, and Neot commanded the doe to depart in safety.

The huntsman was a noble gentleman; he went to Neot in submission and asked his advice on how he should conduct his life; and on Neot's instruction he too became a monk and joined the monastery.

=== The powerful wind ===
Neot had a wealthy neighbour, and one day his agricultural workers were bringing in the harvest on wagons. A strong wind developed, and it was so powerful that it drove the wagons and the oxen and men back to the field from which the corn had been taken. The harvest was unloaded for safety. As soon as the rich man heard of the event, he considered it as a warning, sent for his sin. He hastened to the saint and begged pardon, and made a perpetual donation of money to the tenants of the saint, apparently liberating them from further obligation to work for him.

=== The crows respect the Sabbath services ===
Once a great multitude of crows began to eat the crops and everything they could from the fields, damaging them greatly. People watched over their fields from Monday to Saturday and scared the crows away. However on Sunday the people went to church and the crows took advantage of their absence and feasted on the crops. The people ceased to go to church on Sundays, preferring to guard their crops. Neot saw this and he built a large compound of earth and granite and ordered the crows to gather in it every Sunday at the time of Liturgy: because people should hear the Word of God and because it was bad to harm the fields. The birds obeyed immediately and as long as the saint was alive they flew to the compound every Sunday and remained there till the end of the Holy Service. (There is a Roman or early British earthwork in Eynesbury connected with this miracle.)

== Stained-glass window depicting the miracles ==
The Church of St Neot stands in the village of St Neot, Cornwall. The church was built between 1425 and 1530, on a site where there had previously been an earlier church. It has a series of magnificent stained-glass windows depicting religious themes. One of them shows representations of the miracles connected with Neot.

Grylls describes them in detail; writing in 1844 he says that "they have all been restored as they originally stood":

1. Neot resigning his crown to his younger brother, who is kneeling to receive it; whilst two attendants stand behind. In the background of this and all the other compartments, is seen his monastery...

2. Neot kneeling, taking the vows as monk. The abbot, with the crosier in his hand, reading the vows to him, whilst a monk is covering his head with a cowl. Another monk, in a white dress, bears the holy oil...

3. Neot, reading his psalter, as was his daily wont, with his feet immersed in his favourite well, rescues a doe from her hunter, who, struck with awe at the miracle which has preserved her from his dogs, is delivering up his horn to the saint, and afterwards turns monk himself...

4. Neot receiving instructions from an angel, respecting three fishes which he shows him in his well. These instructions were, that so long as he took one, and only one, of the fishes for his daily food, the supply should never be diminished...

5. The saint, sick in his bed, ordering his servant Barius to bring him one of the fish for his dinner, as usual...

6. Barius, anxious to suit his sick master’s taste, has here taken two fishes from the well, (which is seen behind with the third fish in it) and is boiling one in a vessel, and broiling the other on a gridiron...

7. Barius bringing the two fishes on a dish to his master in bed...

8. Barius, sent back by the saint, in alarm at his having transgressed the angel's instructions, throwing the two fish again into the well, where they are immediately restored to life...

9. A thief driving away the saint's oxen from before the monastery...

10. A man and boy ploughing the ground with four stags, which, at the saint’s prayers, came and offered themselves tamely to the yoke, in lieu of the stolen oxen...

11. One of the robbers (who were terrified by the report of the foregoing miracle) bringing back the oxen to Neot, in consequence of whose instructions out of the book he is reading to him, the thief and his companions become monks, and enter the convent...

12. Neot kneeling to receive Pope Martin's blessings who wears the papal crown and robes, and holds the aspergillum, or holy-water sprinkle, in his right hand, and his staff, surmounted by the triple cross, in the left...

Along the bottom of the window runs the following inscription (in Latin): At the cost of the young men of this parish of St. Neot, who erected this window, A.D. 1528.

== Eastern Orthodox Church ==
Neot is venerated in the Orthodox church. His saint's day in that church is 31 July in the Julian calendar, which is 13 August according to the Gregorian calendar.

== Relics ==
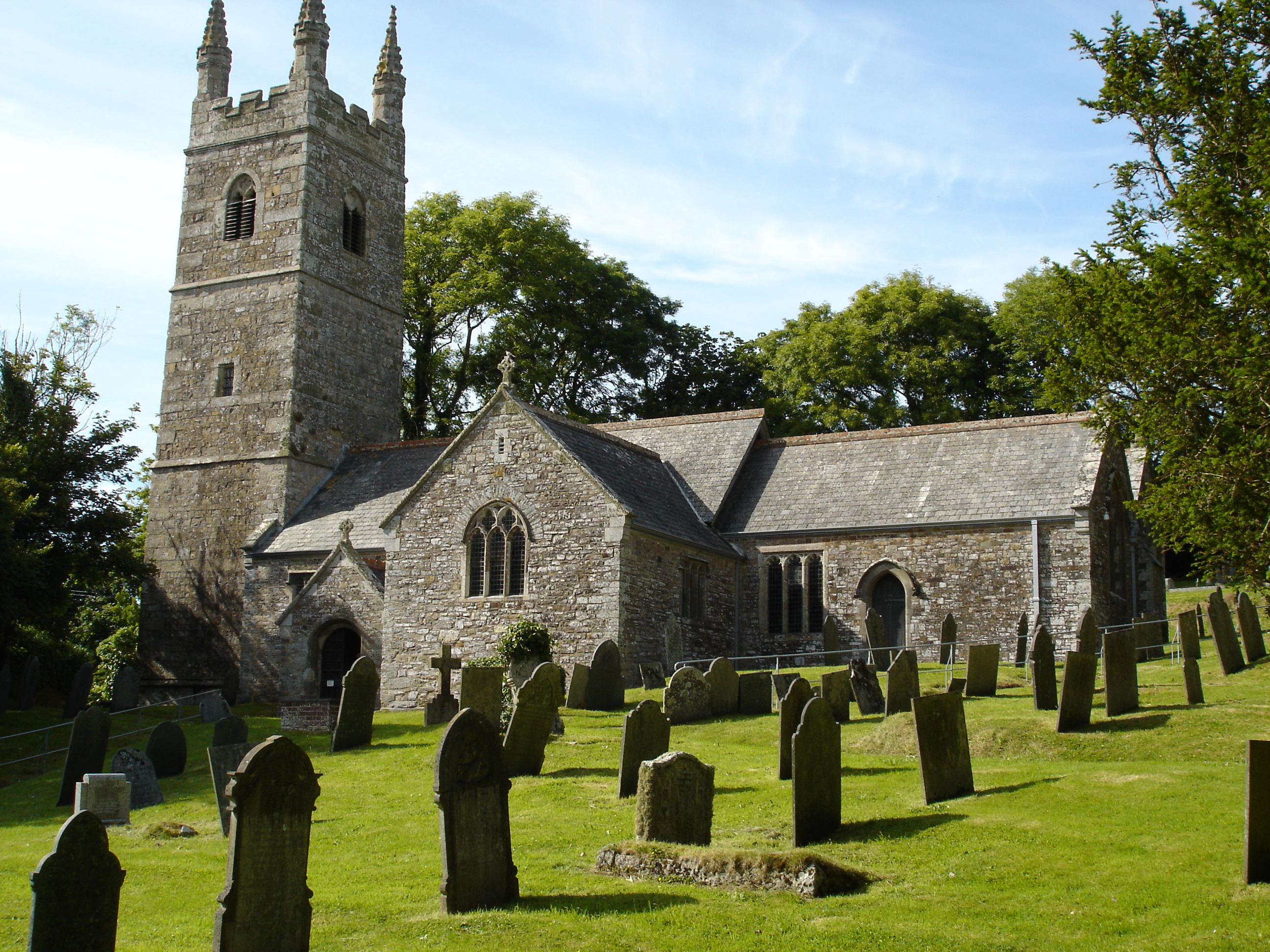
St Winwaloe's Church, Poundstock

There are no physical remains known of St Neot. He is remembered by the name of the large town of St Neots in Cambridgeshire (Note: Formerly Huntingdonshire.) and the village of St Neot in Cornwall. St Winwaloe's Church, Poundstock, Cornwall, was dedicated to him from medieval times until 1970, when it reverted to its original dedication to Saint Winwaloe.

St Neot's well is located a short distance to the west of the church at St Neot, Cornwall. Hope, writing in 1893, said that "It was arched over by General Carlyon, having fallen in many years ago."

There is a holy well dedicated to Neot about half a mile north of Poundstock church. A well house was constructed there in 1914.

Both wells may be seen by a simple search on Youtube.

== The Annals of St Neots ==
Contemporary records of Neot's life are scarce, and in many cases vague and self-contradictory. There are four surviving manuscripts which purport to describe his life, and writers in the last few centuries have arrived at different conclusions from them. The writer Asser was contemporaneous with Neot but his work on Alfred the Great and available in translation throws only limited light on Neot. A so-called "interpolation" is associated with Asser's work; this was written by a different, anonymous writer, and this too is of limited value. The work entitled Annals of St Neots is so-called only because the writer Leland met with a copy of the work at the priory of St Neots, and hence bestowed upon it the title Chronicon Fani Sancti Neoti.

== Notes ==
In this Wikipedia article, archaic spellings have been retained in quoted passages.
