= Edwin Harris =

English painter (1855–1906)

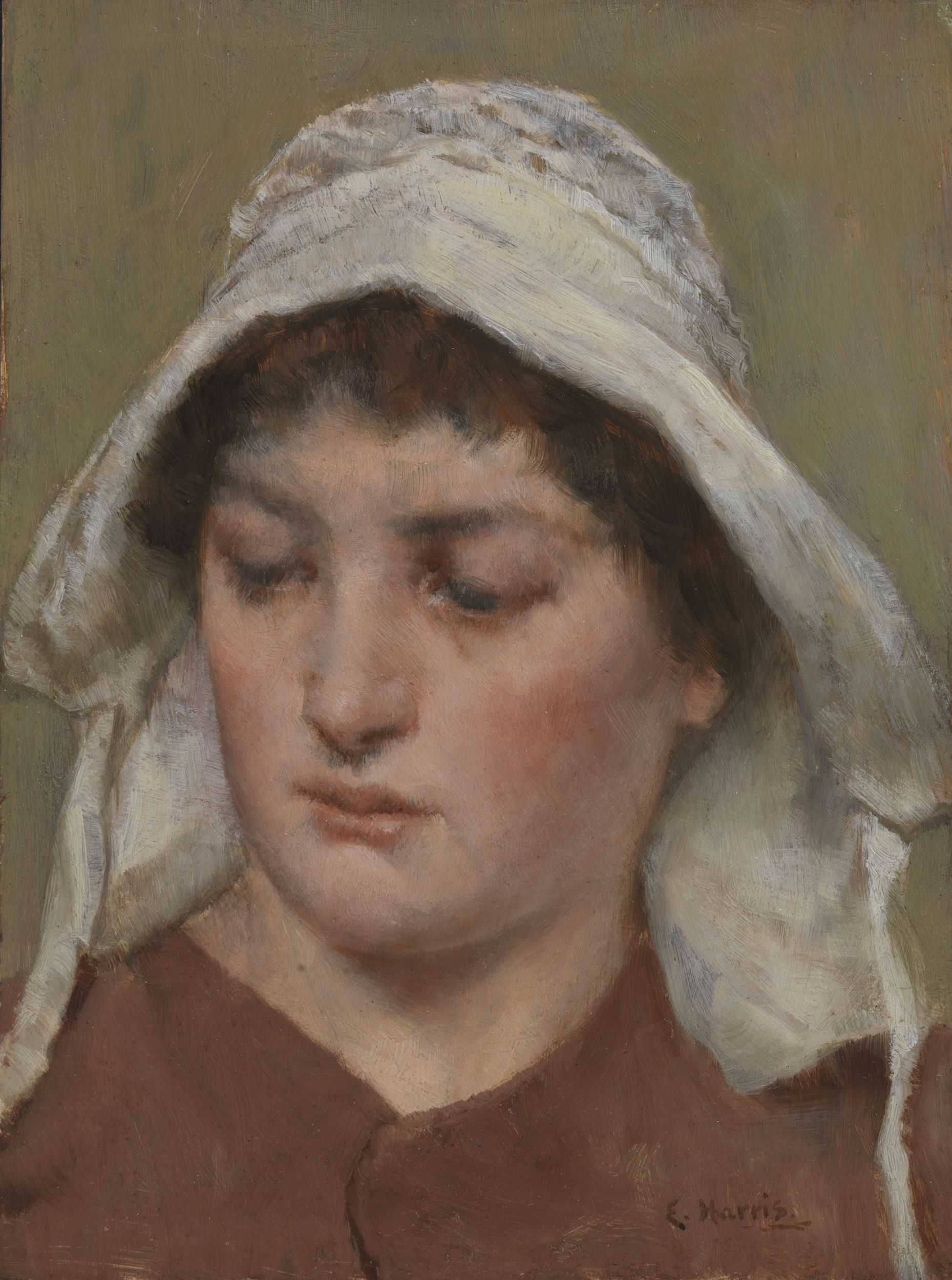
- Young Woman in a Bonnet
- Born: Edwin Harris; 1855; Birmingham, England
- Died: 1906 (aged 50–51); Cleeve Prior
- Known for: Painting
- Movement: Newlyn School

Edwin Harris (1855–1906) was an English painter from Ladywood, Birmingham.

== Biography ==
Harris entered the Birmingham School of Art at the age of fourteen, where he worked under Charles Morgan, F G Jackson and Edward R Taylor. Fellow students included Walter Langley, William John Wainwright and William Breakspeare. Harris was appointed as assistant master and after two years set up his own studio, painting pictures and giving lessons.

In 1880 he progressed to Verlat's Academy in Antwerp with Wainwright. Their Birmingham training stood them in good stead and he and Wainwright were selected to join the group of twelve elite students who were given a separate studio to work life size from the nude. He began exhibiting at the RBSA and was an early member of the Art Circle formed to encourage younger artists.

He first visited Newlyn in 1881 and the following year he was at Pont Aven in Brittany, then a magnet for plein-air painters from all over Europe. He settled in Newlyn, Cornwall in 1883 and stayed there for twelve years. Harris was recognised as one of the pioneers of the Newlyn School of artists which included his fellow Birmingham painters, Langley, Wainwright and William Banks Fortescue. Joined by Alexander and Elizabeth Stanhope Forbes, Thomas Cooper Gotch and Frederick Hall, the colony became the focus for modern painting in Britain. He left Newlyn in 1895 and took up portrait painting in Cardiff, Newport and Bristol and it became his main source of income.

In 1898 he returned to Birmingham, opening a studio in Norwich Union Chambers before settling in Cleeve Prior, Worcestershire where he died.

Harris was elected Associate in 1885 and Member in 1886 of the Royal Birmingham Society of Artists.
