= Rose Mead =

British painter

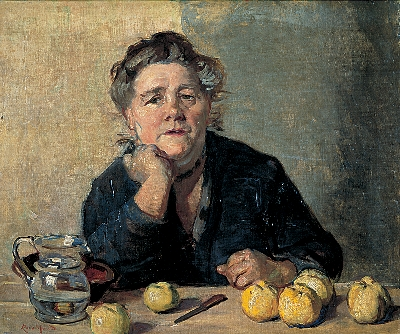
- Barbara Stone - Rose Mead (c. 1940)
- Born: 4 December 1867; Suffolk, England
- Died: 1946; Suffolk, England
- Education: Lincoln School of Art, Westminster School of Art
- Known for: Portrait painting
- Movement: traditional

Emma Rose Mead (4 December 1867 – late March 1946) was a British born portrait painter who exhibited at the Royal Academy summer exhibition and was a colleague of Augustus John. Mead was a prolific artist who worked in various fields – landscapes, street scenes, still lifes and flower studies alongside her portrait work, using both oil on canvas and watercolour on paper.

== Early life ==
Mead was born in Bury St Edmunds, the daughter of a plumber, glazier and house painter. She was aged 20 before she had any formal artistic training when she attended the Lincoln School of Art. She left there to study at the Westminster School of Art, in London in 1892, under the tutorship of Frederick Brown just prior to his appointment as Professor at the Slade School of Fine Art. During this time she painted a self-portrait in the act of cooking. A company that made cookers similar to the one pictured offered £500.00 (equivalent to £55,000 in 2025) to add their name, an amount she refused because she was unwilling to "prostitute" her art. Mead's stay at Westminster was brief before having to return home to nurse her father. After his death Mead studied under Auguste Joseph Delécluse in Paris, where a pastel portrait was exhibited at the Paris Salon. This same portrait was exhibited at the Royal Academy in 1896.

== Later life ==
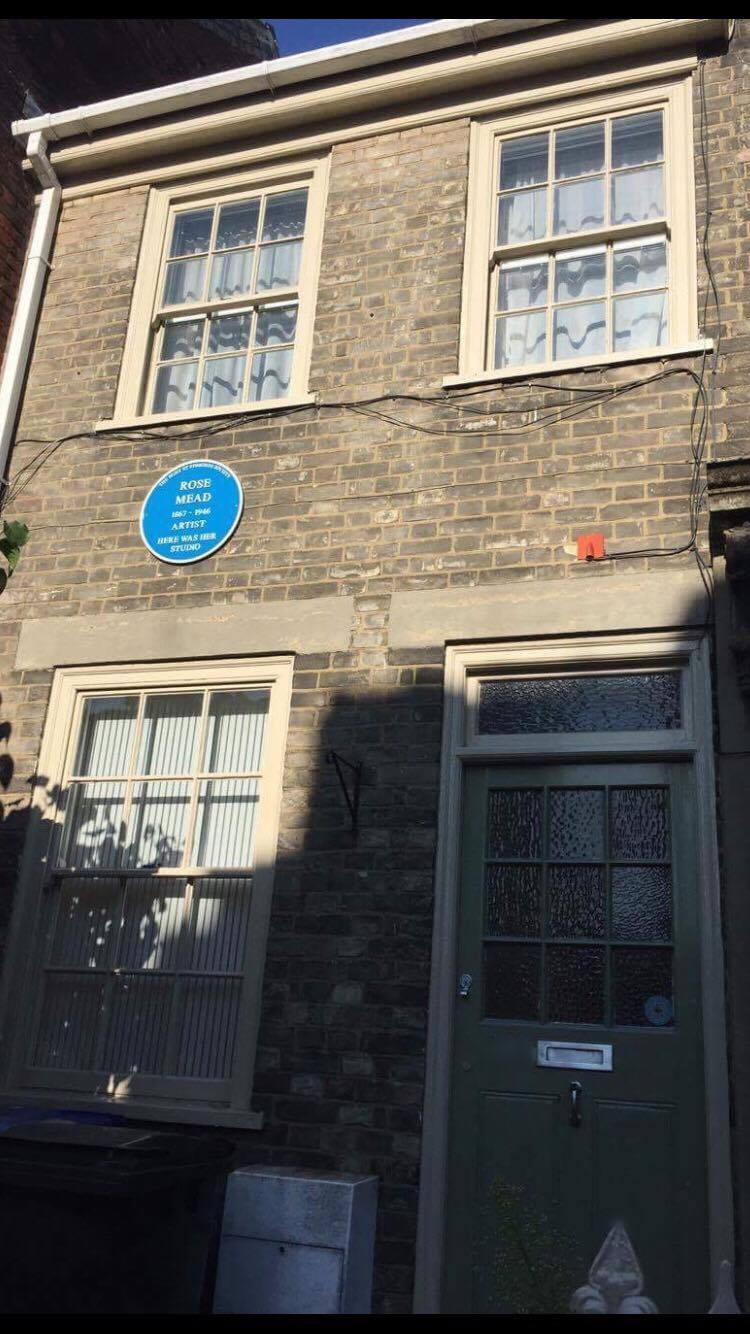
18A Crown Street - the house where artist Rose Mead lived, located in Bury St Edmunds, England.

Mead returned to Bury St Edmunds in 1897, never- except for the rare holiday- to leave again. In the same year Cuisine en Boheme was shown at the Royal Academy summer exhibition. Two paintings Friday Morning at St Mary's and My Mother were shown in the 1899 exhibition. Rose Mead nursed her mother until her death in 1919, whilst earning a living painting portraits, mainly commissioned by local dignitaries. In 1929 she visited Newlyn in Cornwall, visiting the existing Newlyn School of artists of that time. One figure study titled Painted in Dod Procter's studio in Newlyn is a known result of the visit.

In c. 1933 she visited the South of France, a watercolour of St Paul de Vence provides a record of that time. The artist was known by locals to approach girls and young women if she was attracted by some characteristic, and would ask if, with their parents permission, they would be happy to pose for her. Whilst painting she counselled them not to get married, urging them to find fulfilment in a career, one sitter remembering that once the artist had discovered she had married – "She felt that I had quite changed and that it had a detrimental effect on my personality".

The artist never achieved the promise shown at the start of her career, it is thought mainly because of the breaks caused by the death of her father and the need to care for her mother until she was aged 52.

She was found dead at the bottom of her studio stairs in Crown Street, Bury St Edmunds at the end of March 1946 at the age of 78.

== Legacy ==
A 'representative collection' of Rose Mead's paintings are held, and some shown, in Bury St Edmunds' Moyses Hall museum. A Rose Mead painting of the Unitarian Meeting House in Bury was displayed in an exhibition marking the building's 300 year anniversary.

Frederick Pawsey published a series of 12 postcards of historic scenes as acted out for the Bury St Edmunds Pageant of 1907. Ralph Tuck also published one of her watercolours as a postcard to promote the event.

== Gallery ==
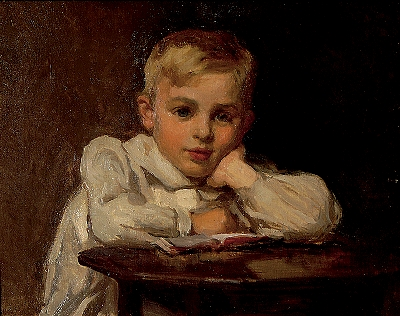
Reginald Mead, Rose Mead c.1910

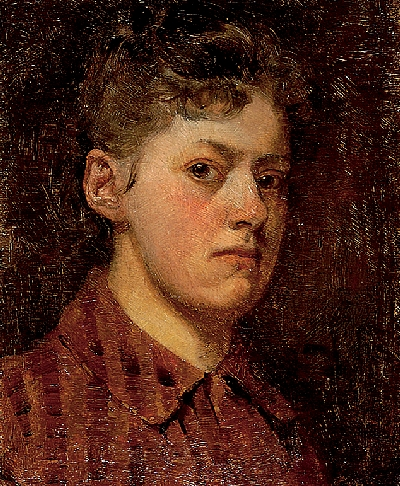
Self Portrait, c.1900

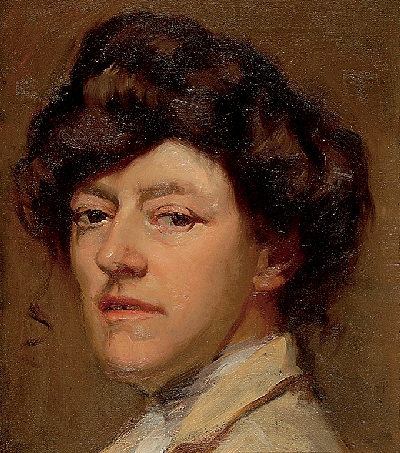
Self Portrait, c.1910

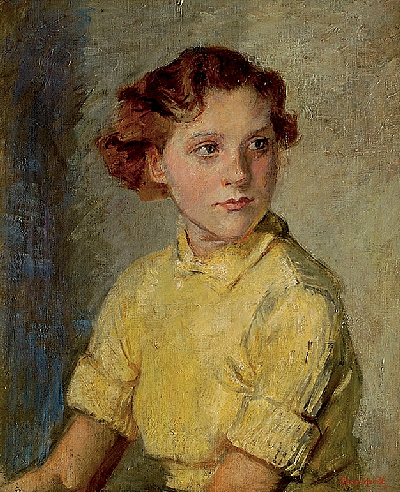
The Outdoor Girl, c.1933

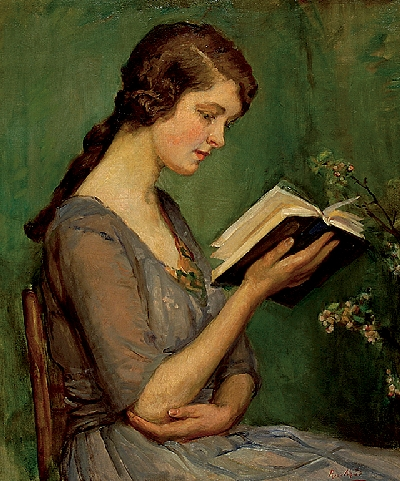
Molly Reading, c.1920
