= Champney Treasure House =

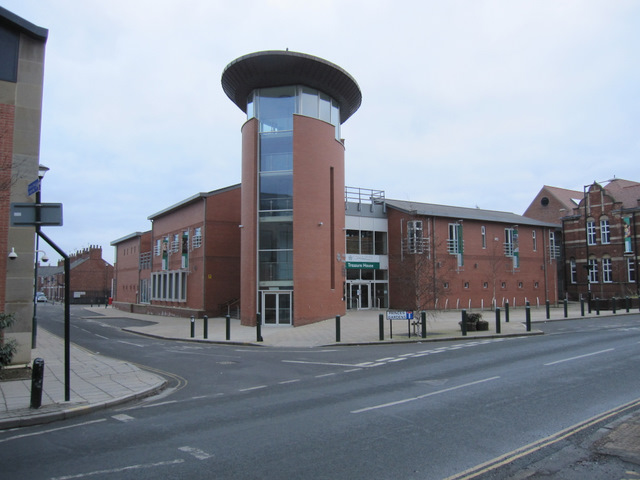
- Champney Treasure House, Beverley
- Former name: The Treasure House
- Location: Beverley, East Riding of Yorkshire, England
- Coordinates: 53°50′26″N 0°25′45″W
- Type: History museum
- Website: www.eastridingculture.co.uk/find-a-place/?entry=treasure_house_main

Champney Treasure House (formerly The Treasure House) is a cultural centre operated by the East Riding of Yorkshire Council in the town of Beverley in the East Riding of Yorkshire, England. The centre acts as the main hub for heritage and information services, and contains the East Riding Archives and Local Studies, Beverley Library, Beverley Art Gallery and Champney Treasure House Museum. The building also contains a coffee lounge and gift shop. The top floor, known as 'The Tower', serves as an elevated sightseeing platform, showcasing 360 degree views of the Beverley Minster and the town of Beverley.

== History ==
The original grade II listed building, designed by architect John Cash, was completed in stages with Beverley Library, on the ground floor, opening in 1906 and Beverley Art Gallery on the first floor in 1910. The idea and funding to build a public Library and Art Gallery came from Beverley-born businessman John Edward Champney (1846–1921).

In 1928, an extension was completed to the East side of the building to house a new reference library on the ground floor, occupied by East Riding Registration & Celebratory Services from late 2024, and a lecture room on the first floor, now used as the Art Gallery exhibition space.

Initial plans were drawn up in 1997 for a contemporary extension to the building, beginning with consultations and preparatory work being carried out by the Beverley Town Council, Beverley Civic Society and national organisations such as English Heritage and the Royal Fine Arts Commission.

Work on The Treasure House started in October 2004, with local construction contractors Houlton engaging with archaeologists and the then Chairman of the East Riding of Yorkshire Council, Councillor Margaret Chapman. A time capsule was buried to mark the start of building work, with its contents reflecting life in the East Riding at that time. It was planned that the capsule would be resurrected in fifty years from its planting, intending to be brought out in 2054. Some of the items entered into it included contributions from local schools such as Longcroft School, with students producing coursework describing how they envisage the world to be in fifty years time.

The initial completion date was stated as being autumn 2006, and it had been hoped that the building would open on the centenary of the opening of the library. Eventually, the building would be completed in 2007. The project had been funded through a grant of £3.9 million from the Heritage Lottery Fund.

The facility underwent a £3.3 million transformation scheme, starting in September 2023 lasting until late 2024, during which it was closed to the public. This included a new customer service centre and the relocation of the registration service to the building. The new facility opened to the public on 9 December 2024.

== Architecture ==
The older parts of the building are constructed of red brick, with sandstone banding, stone and terracotta dressings, and mainly tiled roofs. The original block has three bays flanked by end bays with shaped gables, and to the right is an entrance bay. Recessed on the right is a later gabled range, linked by a two-storey block. The entrance bay has a distyle Ionic portico, above which is a mullioned and transomed bay window, and a copper-covered roof.

== Publicly accessible areas ==
=== Archives and Local Studies ===
At the main entrance of the Treasure House, the research room of the East Riding Archives and Local Studies can be found. Members of the public have access to all of the books, microfiche resources, archive newspapers, documents, pictures and rare books of the East Riding. Experienced archivists are also available to assist with searches. To the left of the research room, there is a conservation workshop where large gallery windows allow viewing of conservators restoring pictures, books and other documents.

=== Beverley Library ===
At the end of the main corridor is the Beverley library, allowing access to all of the library resources including the lending and reference libraries, computers, newspapers and children's area.

=== Beverley Art Gallery ===
Beverley Art Gallery can be found on the first floor of Champney Treasure House, in the original part of the building with a restored Edwardian interior. Beverley’s first public art gallery was envisioned as a place of civic pride and continues this legacy today, displaying highlights from its British art collection alongside a diverse programme of exhibitions to enjoy for free. The gallery collection includes work by local artists Frederick William Elwell RA and Mary Dawson Elwell SWA, as well as the likes of Sir William Russell Flint, Arthur Rackam and Dame Laura Knight. On permanent display, is renowned painting ‘A Panic’ by Henry William Banks Davis, considered to be the world’s largest cattle painting. The exhibition programme showcases work by notable local and international artists, as well as national touring exhibitions. It also hosts a lively programme of events, and has an active group of members: the Friends of Beverley Art Gallery.

==== Recent and Upcoming Exhibitions at Beverley Art Gallery ====
- David Remfry RA retrospective, 2025
- Matisse: Drawing with Scissors, a Hayward Gallery Touring Exhibition, 27 May – 1 July 2023
- Home is So Sad, Yeonkyoung Lee and Sam Robinson, 1 April – 13 May 2023
- Walk This Way, Ian & Stef Mitchell, 21 January – 18 March 2023
- Reflections of Japan in East Yorkshire, 16 October 2021 – 26 March 2022

=== Champney Treasure House Museum ===
On the first floor there is a museum display of 'East Riding Treasures'. In addition to displays on the geology, natural history, landscape and people, there is the South Cave Weapons Cache, a nationally important display of Iron Age swords. In this gallery, there are also interactive activities for children, including puzzles, dressing-up costumes and a drawing table. In a neighbouring corridor, there is a gallery of temporary museum displays, which are frequently-changing and are often prepared by local community groups, or touring exhibitions.
