= Pawsey =

Pawsey may refer to:

== People ==
- Charles Pawsey (1894–1972), British colonial administrator
- Charles Pawsey (rugby league) (born 1923), English rugby player
- Frederick George Pawsey (1870-1953), English printer and photographer
- Jim Pawsey (born 1933), British politician
- Joseph Lade Pawsey (1908–1962), Australian scientist
- Ken Pawsey (born 1940), Australian ice hockey player
- Mark Pawsey (born 1957), British politician

== Other uses ==
- Pawsey (crater)
- Pawsey Supercomputing Centre, in Perth, Western Australia

== See also ==
- Pawsey Medal
