= George Sedger =

English architect

- Born: 1856
- Died: 1914 (aged 57–58)
- Education: Articled to George Nattress
- Occupation: Architect
- Practice: 28 Great James Street, Bedford Row, London W.C
- Buildings: Gibney Building, Lincoln.

George Sedger (1856–c 1914) was an architect who worked in London. His most notable building is the Gibney Building of the Lincoln College of Art. His father was the vicar of Fundenhall in Norfolk.

== Career ==
Sedger was articled to George Nattress between 1873 and 1878 and for a short period Nattress and Sedger worked in partnership. They submitted plans for the building of Great Yarmouth Town Hall in 1878 competition and were the placed 2nd. Between 1879 and 1881 Gibney was assistant to Charles Foster Haywood of Adelphi, London. He set up his own practice at 28 Great James Street, Bedford Row, London W.C in 1882 and continued to work there until 1914. He became a Licentiate of the Royal Institute of British Architects in 1911. His most important surviving building is the Lincoln School of Science and Art, now part of Lincoln College in Monks’ Road, Lincoln. This is a Grade II listed building In 1888 he won the competition for the design of the Stockport Technical College. This was very similar to his design for the Lincoln School of Science and Art.

== Works ==
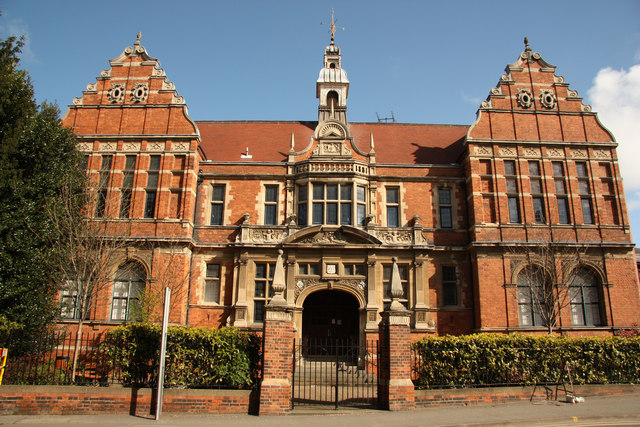
Gibney Building

- Gibney Building of the Lincoln School of Art. Monks’ Road, Lincoln. Originally built as the Lincoln School of Science and Art in 1885–6. Symmetrical, brick, Dutch Renaissance Style or Pont Street Dutch with two gables and clock tower.
- Stockport Technical School. (1888) This was demolished in 1965.

== Literature ==
- Antram, N. (revised); Pevsner, N. & Harris, J., (1989), The Buildings of England: Lincolnshire, Penguin Books; reissued by Yale University Press.
- Brodie. A. (ed.) (2001), Directory of British Architects, 1834–1914: 2 vols. Vol 2 pg. 576. British Architectural Library, Royal Institute of British Architects.
