= Molescroft =

Village and civil parish in the East Riding of Yorkshire, England

Coordinates: 53.853074°N 0.451765°W

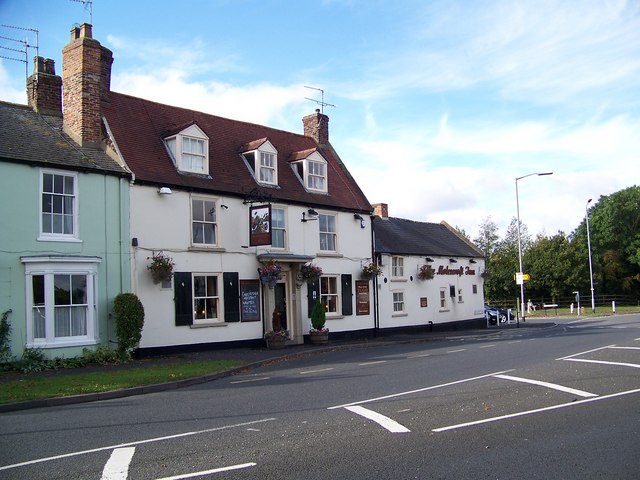
- Molescroft Inn

- Location within the East Riding of Yorkshire
- Population: 6,820 (2011 census)
- OS grid reference: TA019407
  - London: 173 mi (278 km) S
- Civil parish: Molescroft
- Unitary authority: East Riding of Yorkshire
- Ceremonial county: East Riding of Yorkshire
- Region: Yorkshire and the Humber
- Country: England
- Sovereign state: United Kingdom
- Post town: BEVERLEY
- Postcode district: HU17
- Dialling code: 01482
- Police: Humberside
- Fire: Humberside
- Ambulance: Yorkshire
- UK Parliament: Beverley and Holderness

Molescroft is a village and civil parish in the East Riding of Yorkshire, England. It is situated approximately 0.5 miles (0.8 km) north-west of Beverley town centre adjoining its northern border. It lies to the north of the A1174 road and is on the eastern slopes of the Yorkshire Wolds.

The Yorkshire Coast railway line from Hull to Scarborough passes through the parish but the nearest station is Beverley.

According to the 2011 UK census, Molescroft had a population of 6,820, an increase on the 2001 UK census figure of 6,810. This is due to major housing developments in the north and east of the village due to unused greenfield land, firstly in the late 1990s and secondly, on a smaller scale, in the 2010s. Over 65s make up over 25% of the population, higher than Under 18s. Until the early 1990s, Molescroft was very small, with the majority of the modern village being used as allotments and small farming ventures. However, housing developers saw a large, cheap area of land to place housing for the swiftly expanding Beverley. Within a decade, Molescroft grew from a small agricultural village with a population of a few hundred, to 6,810 in 2001.

== History ==
The name Molescroft derives from the Old English Mulscroft meaning 'Mul's croft', or mūlscroft meaning 'mule's croft'.

Molescroft is listed in the Domesday Book as in the Hundred of Sneculfcros in the East Riding of Yorkshire. The settlement contained two households, two villagers, and two ploughlands. In 1066 Ealdred, Archbishop of York, was the Lord, this in 1086 transferred to the canons of Beverley Minster, and the later Archbishop of York Thomas of Bayeux who was also Tenant-in-chief to King William I.

In 1823 Molescroft was in the parish of Beverley Minster, and the Wapentake of Harthill. Population at the time was 111, with occupations including four farmers, and the landlord of The Wellington public house. Residents included two gentlemen.

== Facilities ==
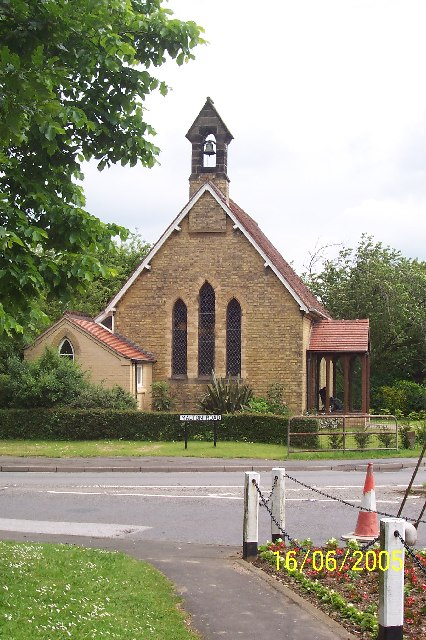
St Leonard's Church, Molescroft

The parish church that is dedicated to St Leonard was built in 1896, with the addition of a chancel in 1979 and further additions of a vestry, kitchen and toilets in 2001.

Longcroft School is situated in the village although it has a very large catchment area, including Molescroft, northern and eastern Beverley, Leconfield, Cherry Burton and other surrounding villages. The primary school in the village is Molescroft Primary School, serving Molescroft and Northern Beverley. This school is routinely rated outstanding by Ofsted and is extremely popular.

The Molescroft Inn is a late 18th-century public house that is now a Grade II listed building.

Woodhall Way playing fields are a large green space with a children's play area, skate ramps, an enclosed combined basketball and football pitch and a Pétanque court.

Molescroft Pavilion is a community hall and events venue ran by the parish council and also sited on Woodhall Way playing fields.

== See also ==
- Listed buildings in Molescroft
