= Frederick Hall (painter) =

English painter

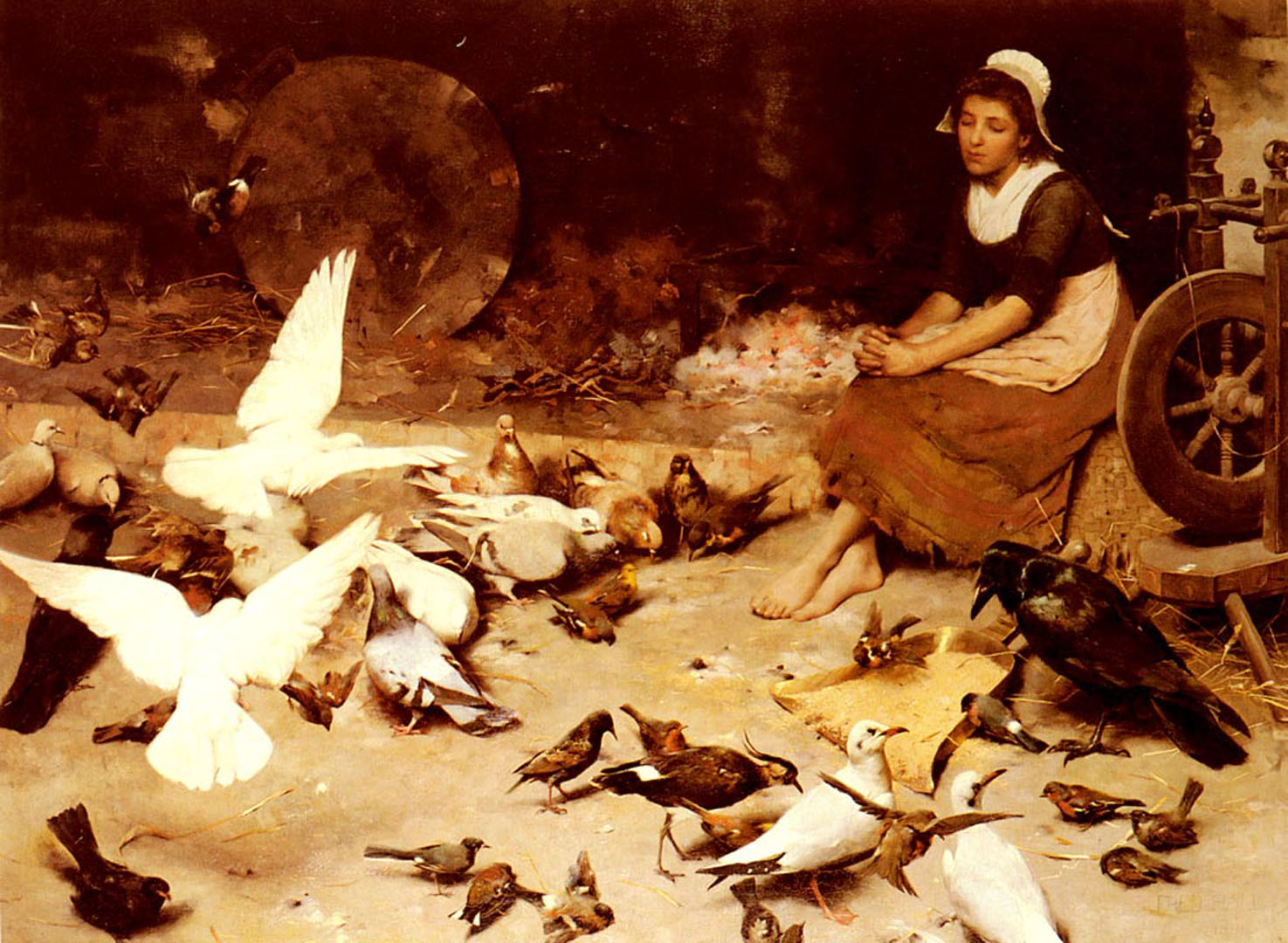
Cinderella by Frederick Hall, 1891

Frederick Hall (6 February 1860 – 21 August 1948), often known as (and signing his work as) Fred Hall, was an English impressionist painter of landscapes, rustic subjects, and portraits who exhibited at the Royal Academy and the Paris Salon, where he was awarded a gold medal in 1912. He was an important member of the Newlyn School, in Cornwall, and is notable for both his series of witty caricatures of his fellow Newlyn artists (including Frank Bramley, Stanhope Forbes, and Norman Garstin) and his artistic development away from the strict realism of the Newlyn School towards impressionism.

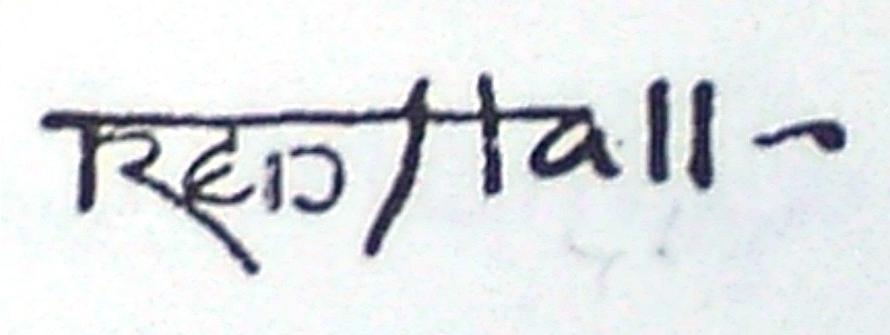
Frederick Hall's signature

== Life and career ==
Born in Stillington, Yorkshire, Hall studied art at the Lincoln School of Art between 1879 and 1881, before moving on to study under Charles Verlat in Antwerp.

He became a member of the Newlyn School in Cornwall at some time between 1883 and 1885 although the exact date is uncertain. He remained there, joining fellow ex-Lincoln School of Art student Frank Bramley, until 1898. He exhibited at the Royal Academy from 1886 onward, and at the Paris Salon, winning gold there in 1912. He also exhibited at the Royal Society of British Artists on Suffolk Street, London, the Grosvenor Gallery, the New Gallery, and the New English Art Club, but resigned from the latter in 1890.

Hall also drew caricatures and painted works that reflected the public taste for storytelling pictures. In 1898, he married Agnes Beryl Dodd, with whom he had a daughter.

With his family, he later settled in Speen, near Newbury in Berkshire.

== Style ==
His early work from the Newlyn School period exhibits a sympathy for the Newlyn School's plein air practise and ideas concerning social realism. However, his style did not remain static and it continued to develop into a more impressionist mode. In the late 1880s, he gravitated towards landscapes, spending more time away from Newlyn, on the Somerset coast in Porlock.

His later work exhibits a more mellow air and suggestions of the influence of George Clausen and H. H. La Thangue in the tints used.

His caricatures of his fellow Newlyn artists were often witty and sharply observant.

== Contemporary criticism ==
The Royal Cornwall Gazette, reviewing the 1886 exhibition by the Institute of Painters in Oil Colours, praised the picturesque quality of the houses and beach of his Cornish Village (1886), but criticised the inclusion of figures who lacked any raison d' être for being there. His The Goose (1888) was exhibited at the Royal Academy's 1888 exhibition and was described by The Ipswich Journal as being clever and powerful, while The Leeds Mercury called it humorous and The Graphic 'broadly-comic' and 'eccentric in composition', even grotesque.

The Morning Post commended Hall's The Adversity (1889) for its eloquence and harmony of subject and landscape when it was exhibited at the Royal Academy in May 1889.

His Twilight (1892) was noted by The Leeds Mercury for its poetic capture of the final gleams of an autumn day, but his The Drinking Pool (1897) was criticised by the Glasgow Herald for lacking poetry, although it conceded that it was cleverly painted. The Morning Post, however, considered it pleasing due to its brilliant and harmonious colours.

== Selected paintings ==
- An Orchard near Newlyn, Cornwall (1884)
- Home from the Fields (1886)
- Evening (1886)
- In the Kitchen Garden (1887)
- The End of the Day (1891)
- The Result of High Living (1892)
- The Plough (1896)
- The Drinking Pool (1898)
- The Smithy (1900)
- Newlyn Cottage (1910)
- J. W. Holmes, Esq., Mayor of East Retford (1886, 1891 & 1901) (1919) – Retford Town Hall
