= Listed buildings in Molescroft =

Molescroft is a civil parish in the county of the East Riding of Yorkshire, England. It contains seven listed buildings that are recorded in the National Heritage List for England. All the listed buildings are designated at Grade II, the lowest of the three grades, which is applied to "buildings of national importance and special interest". The parish contains the village of Molescroft, since the later 1920s a residential suburb of Beverley. The listed buildings consist of house, an outbuilding and a public house.

== Buildings ==
Name and location	Photograph	Date	Notes
Outbuilding, Manor Farm; 53.85282°N 0.45274°W		Early 18th century	The outbuilding is in red brick, with clasping corner buttresses, a stepped eaves cornice, and a pyramidal pantile roof. There are two storeys, and on the ground floor are double doors under a segmental arch.
Elm Tree Farm; 53.85135°N 0.45451°W		Early to mid-18th century	The house is in brick, with quoins at the rear, a stepped brick eaves cornice, and a hipped slate roof. There are two storeys, three bays, and later extensions at the rear. On the front is a porch and doorway flanked by narrow windows. The other windows are sashes.
Manor Farmhouse; 53.85254°N 0.45324°W		Early to mid-18th century	The house is in rendered red brick, with rusticated quoins, and a tile roof with a stepped brick eaves cornice and raised coped gables. In the centre is a porch and a doorway, and the windows are casements; all the openings are under hood moulds.
Guildford House; 53.85263°N 0.45101°W		Mid to late 18th century	The house is in rendered brick with a tile roof. There are two storeys and three bays. The central doorway has pilasters, a divided fanlight, and a projecting hood on brackets. This is flanked by canted bay windows with sashess, and on the upper floor are three sash windows.
The Molescroft; 53.85280°N 0.45124°W		Late 18th century	The public house is in colourwashed rendered brick, and has a tile roof with tumbled-in brick to the raised gables on shaped kneelers. There are two storeys and three bays. The central doorway has pilasters, a fanlight, and a projecting hood on elaborate brackets. The windows are sashes, those on the ground floor with shutters, and there are three gabled roof dormers with sashes.
65–69 Molescroft Road; 53.85253°N 0.45083°W		Early 19th century	A terrace of three houses in red brick with a slate roof. There are two storeys and three bays. On the front are three doorways, and on the left is a passage entry, all with fanlights. The windows are sashes, and all the ground floor openings are under segmental brick arches.
71 Molescroft Road; 53.85259°N 0.45094°W		c. 1860	A house in Gothic Revival style, in red brick with stone dressings, a moulded and bracketed eaves cornice, and a slate roof. There are two storeys and two bays. The doorway on the right has a moulded surround and a pointed head and hood mould. To the left is a two-light window flanked by single-light windows, and the upper floor contains a two-light and a single-light windows. All the windows have Perpendicular glazing and lights with cinquefoil heads.
