= William T. Warrener =

English painter

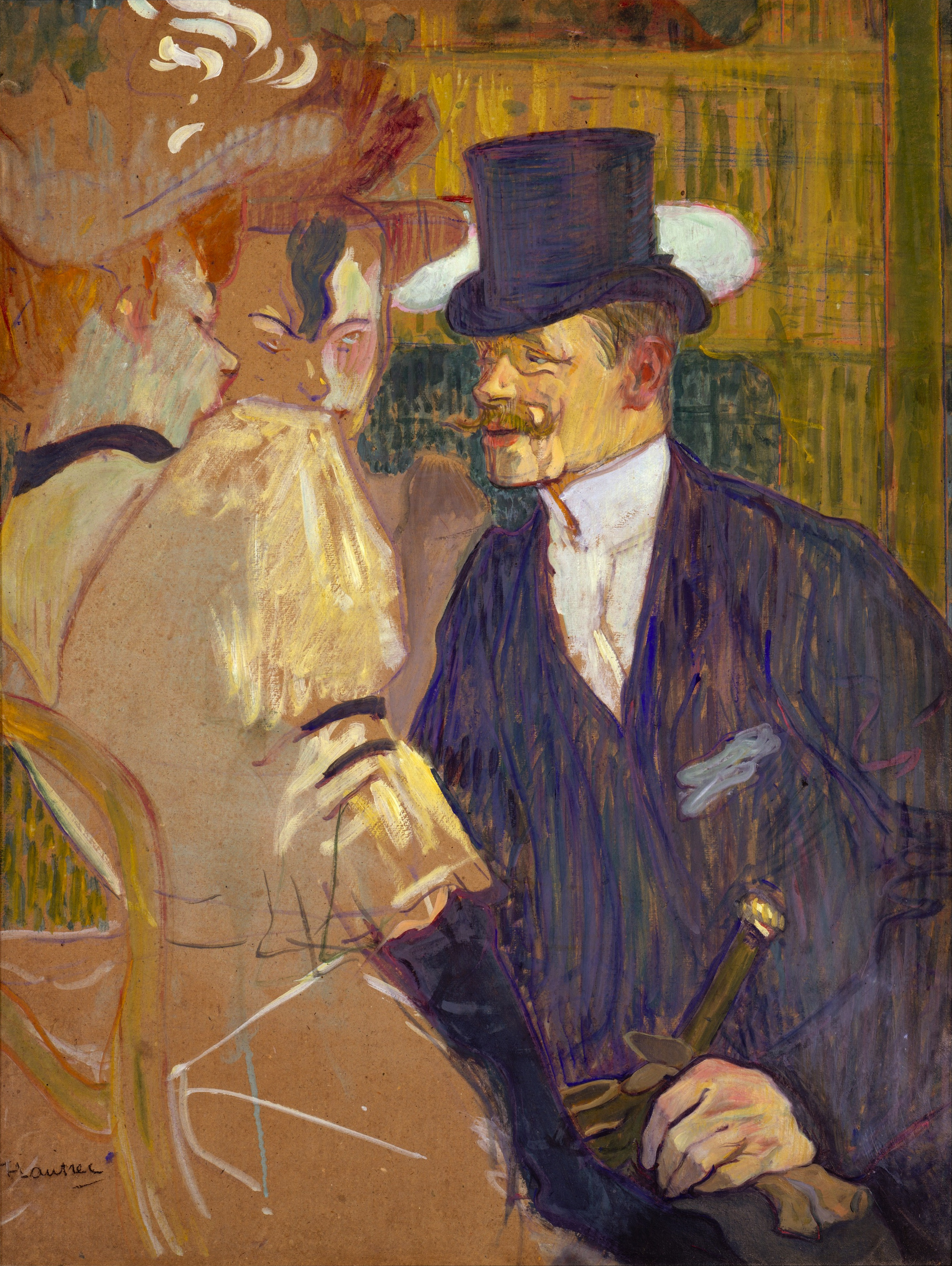
William T. Warrener depicted The Englishman at the Moulin Rouge Henri de Toulouse-Lautrec, 1892.

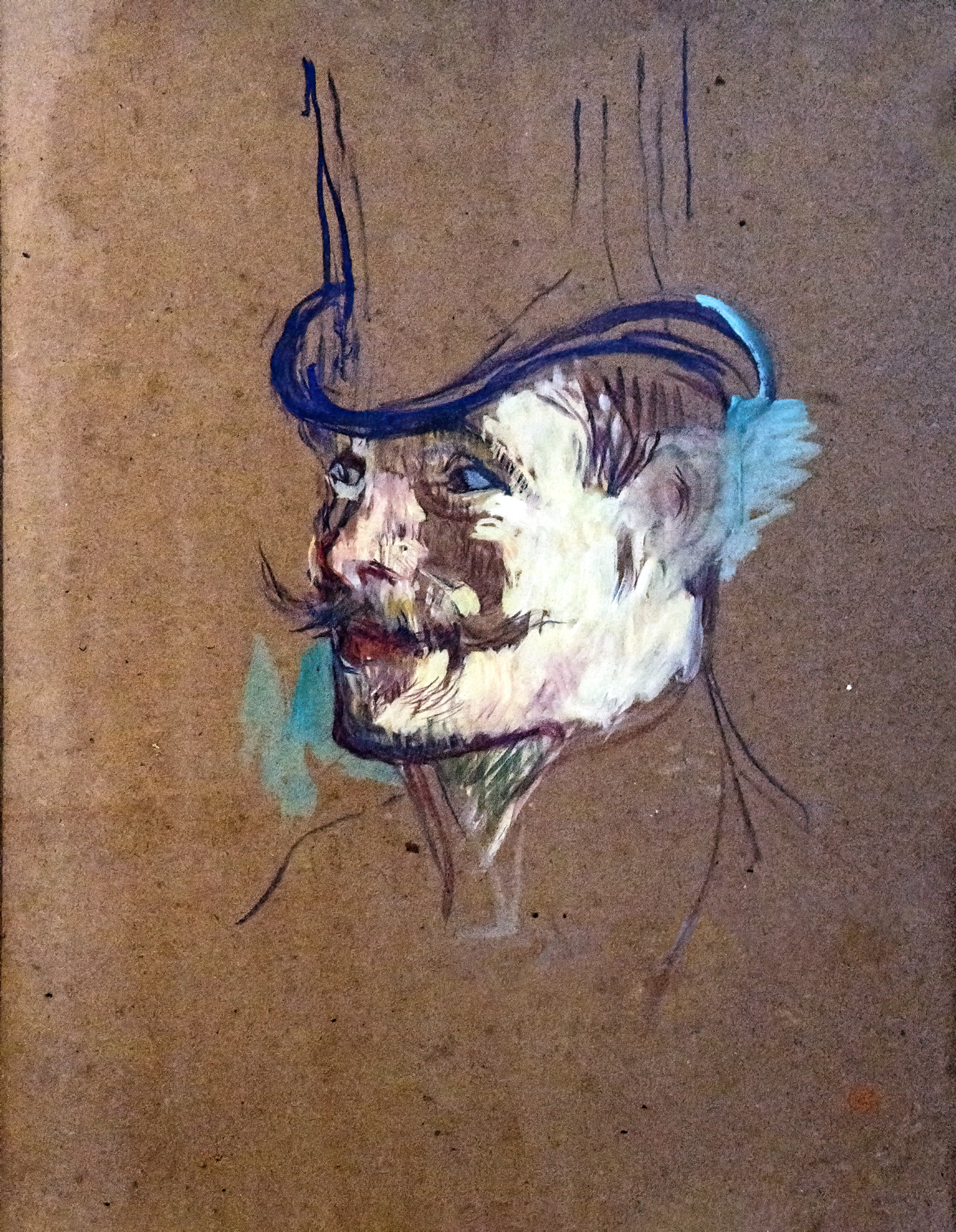
Au Moulin-Rouge. Portrait de Monsieur Warner Musée Toulouse-Lautrec

William Tom Warrener (1861 – 1934) was an English painter of portraits, landscapes and figurative subjects. He is best known for being the subject of his friend Henri de Toulouse-Lautrec's painting L'Anglais au Moulin Rouge (The Englishman at the Moulin Rouge) (1892). He also appears in the background of Jane Avril dansant (1892).

== Life and career ==
Born in Lincoln, England, to a coal merchant and magistrate, Warrener studied at the Lincoln School of Art, where he was awarded the Mayor of Lincoln's gold medal, and a Queen's Prize in the National Art Examinations at South Kensington, before studying at the Slade School of Fine Art, before moving to Paris in 1885 to study at the Académie Julian under Gustave Boulanger and Jules Lefebvre.

He made his debut at the Paris Salon in 1886 and in 1887 won an honourable mention for his painting The Confession. He went on to exhibit eight works at the Royal Academy, which included The Confession and A Comrade's Visit.

The former painting would have been selected for purchase by the Chantrey Bequest, but it was not eligible due to its being painted outside England. In 1890, it was exhibited at the annual arts exhibition held by the Lincoln School of Art, and was described in the Lincoln Gazette as dealing with a difficult subject in a powerful and sympathetic manner.

In 1895, he was elected as a member of the Royal Society of British Artists.

By 1906, Warrener had given up painting and returned to Lincoln in order to involve himself in the family business. That same year, he co-founded the Lincolnshire Drawing Club.

He became the first President of the Lincolnshire Artists' Society on its foundation in 1930.

== Style ==
Warrener's style exhibits a significant French influence, and he was a keen admirer of Toulouse-Lautrec. By 1891, he had moved into more advanced practices, with strong colours such as yellow and green.

== Friendship with Toulouse-Lautrec ==
While in Paris, Warrener made the acquaintance of William Rothenstein and Henri de Toulouse-Lautrec. He was painted by the latter, who used his likeness in two paintings, L'Anglais au Moulin Rouge (The Englishman at the Moulin Rouge) (1892), where he was made to appear much older than his thirty-one years, and Jane Avril dansant (1892), where he appears in the background.
