= Emily Beatrice Bland =

British painter (1864–1951)

- Born: 11 May 1864; Lincoln, England
- Died: 20 January 1951 (aged 86); London, England
- Known for: Painting

Emily Beatrice Bland (11 May 1864 – 20 January 1951) was an English artist who specialised in landscapes, still life and flower paintings.

== Biography ==
Emily Beatrice Bland was born in Lincoln in 1864, and studied at the Lincoln School of Art, then from 1892 to 1894 at the Slade School of Art under Henry Tonks and Fred Brown.

Bland exhibited at the Royal Academy and at the Liverpool Autumn exhibitions. She first exhibited with the New English Art Club in 1897 and was elected a member in 1926. She had a solo exhibition at the Leicester Galleries in 1922. Her work is in the permanent collection of the Tate Gallery.
