= Mary Dawson Elwell =

British painter (1874–1952)

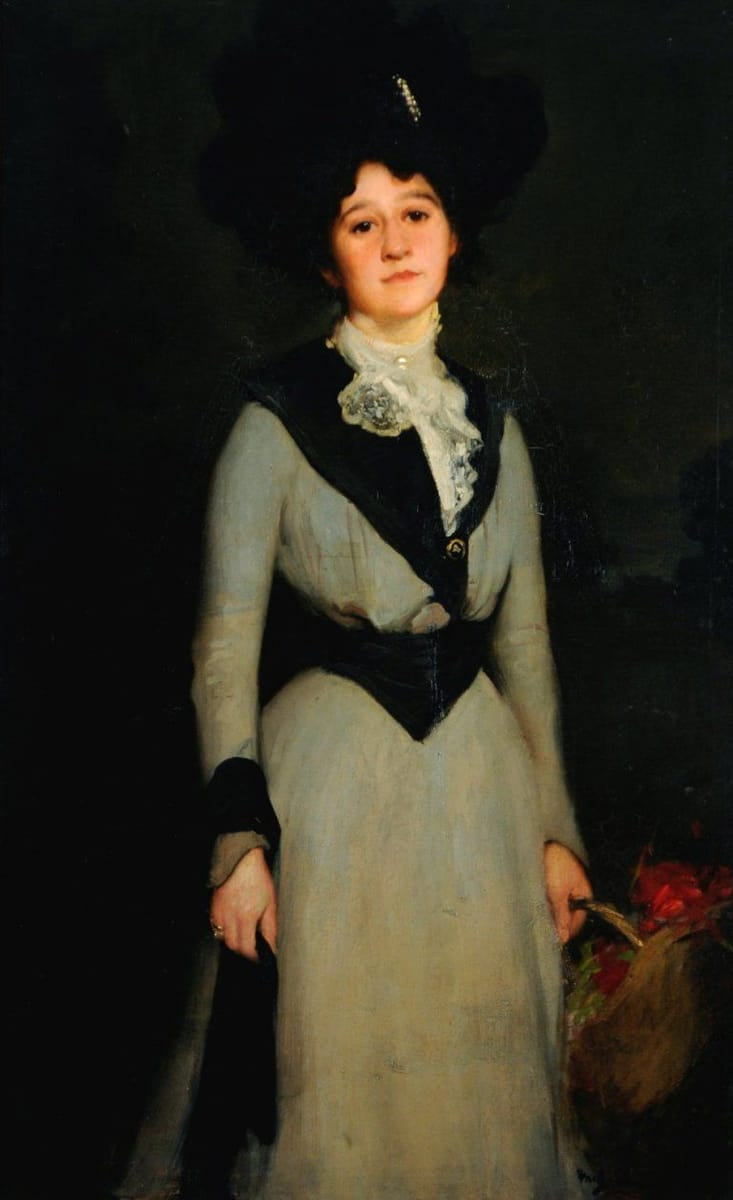
- portrait by Frederick William Elwell (1904)
- Born: Mary Bishop; 13 August 1874; West Derby, England
- Died: 29 August 1952 (aged 78); Beverley, England
- Education: Ellerslie Ladies' College
- Known for: Painting

Mary Dawson Elwell (13 August 1874 – 29 August 1952) was a British painter known for her landscapes and interiors.

Elwell née Bishop was born on 13 August 1874 in West Derby, England, a suburb of Liverpool. She attended Ellerslie Ladies' College in Manchester She was married to Arthur Holmes and after his death she married fellow artist Frederick William Elwell. She was a member of the Society of Women Artists and exhibited with the Royal Academy of Arts and the Royal Glasgow Institute of the Fine Arts.

Elwell died on 29 August 1952 in Beverley. Her paintings are held at Beverley Art Gallery, the Paisley Museum and Art Galleries and North Lincolnshire Museum.

== Gallery ==
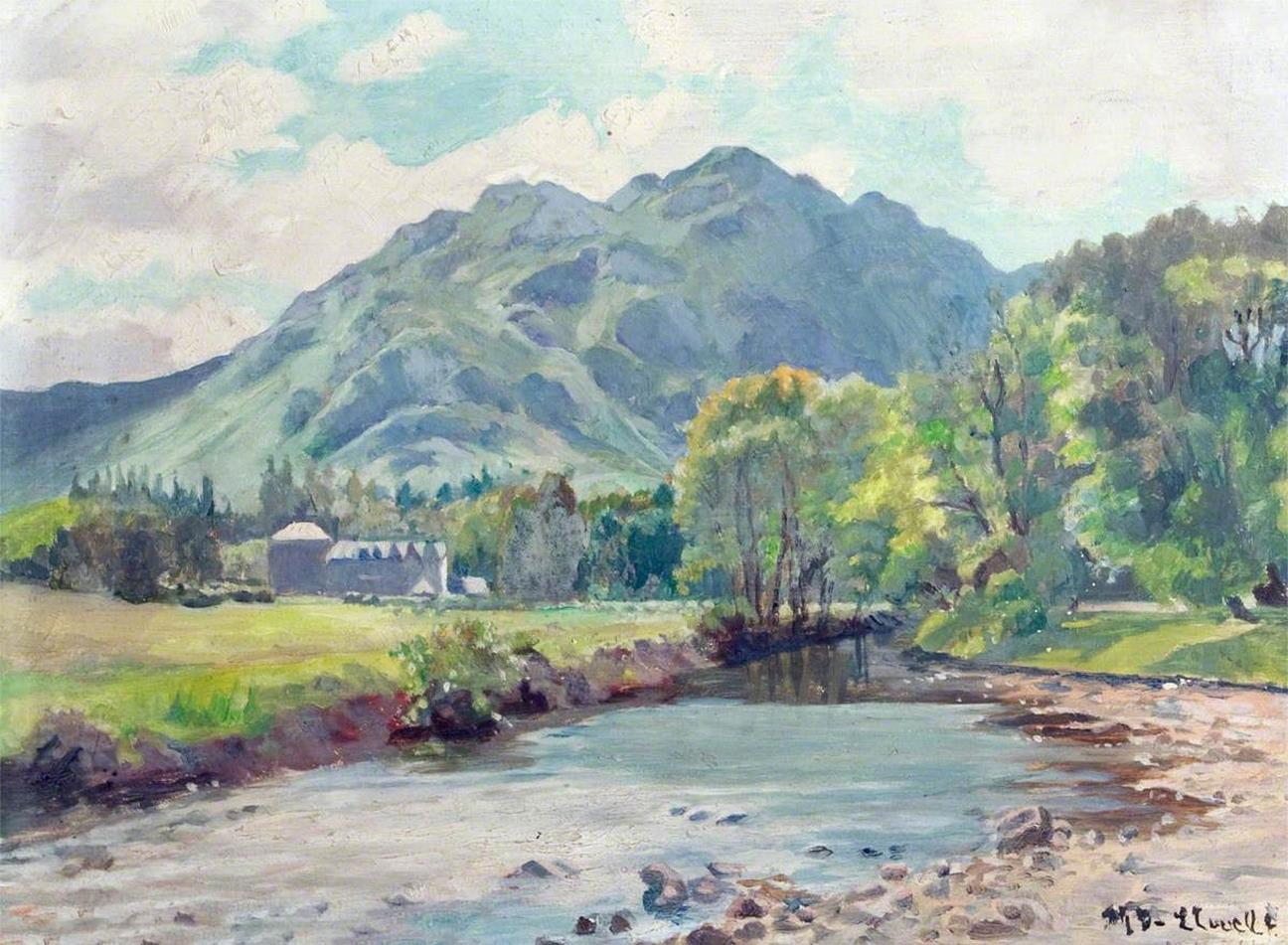
In the Trossachs Highlands ca. 1900

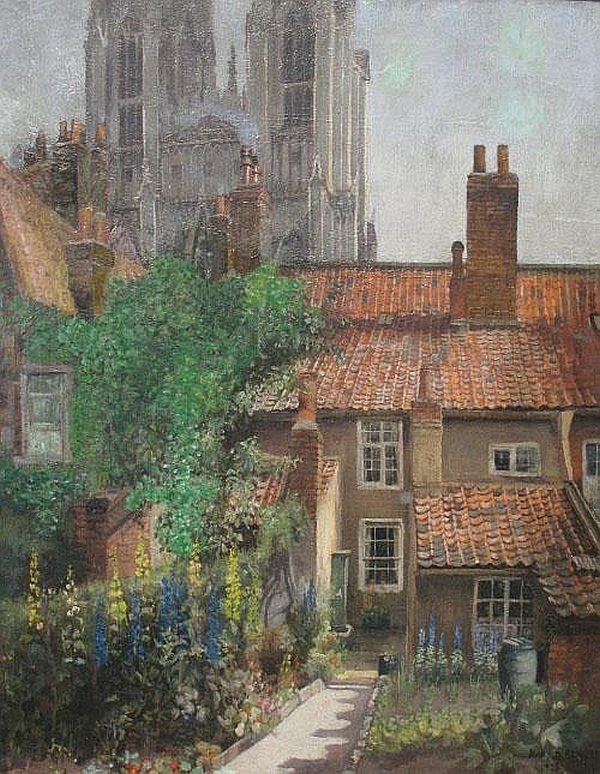
A Garden in Beverley, 1923

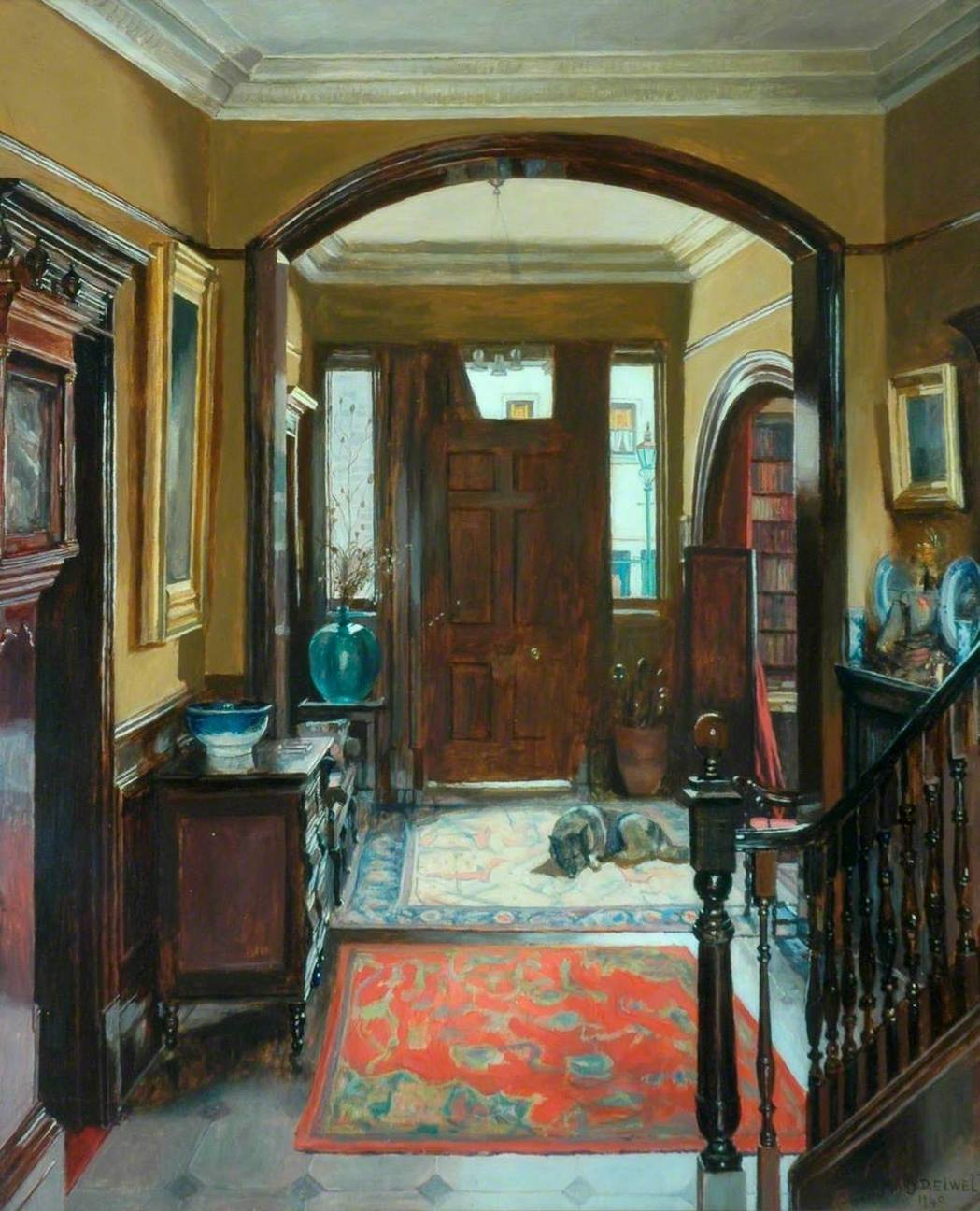
The Front Door, 1940
