= The Englishman at the Moulin Rouge =

Painting by Henri de Toulouse-Lautrec

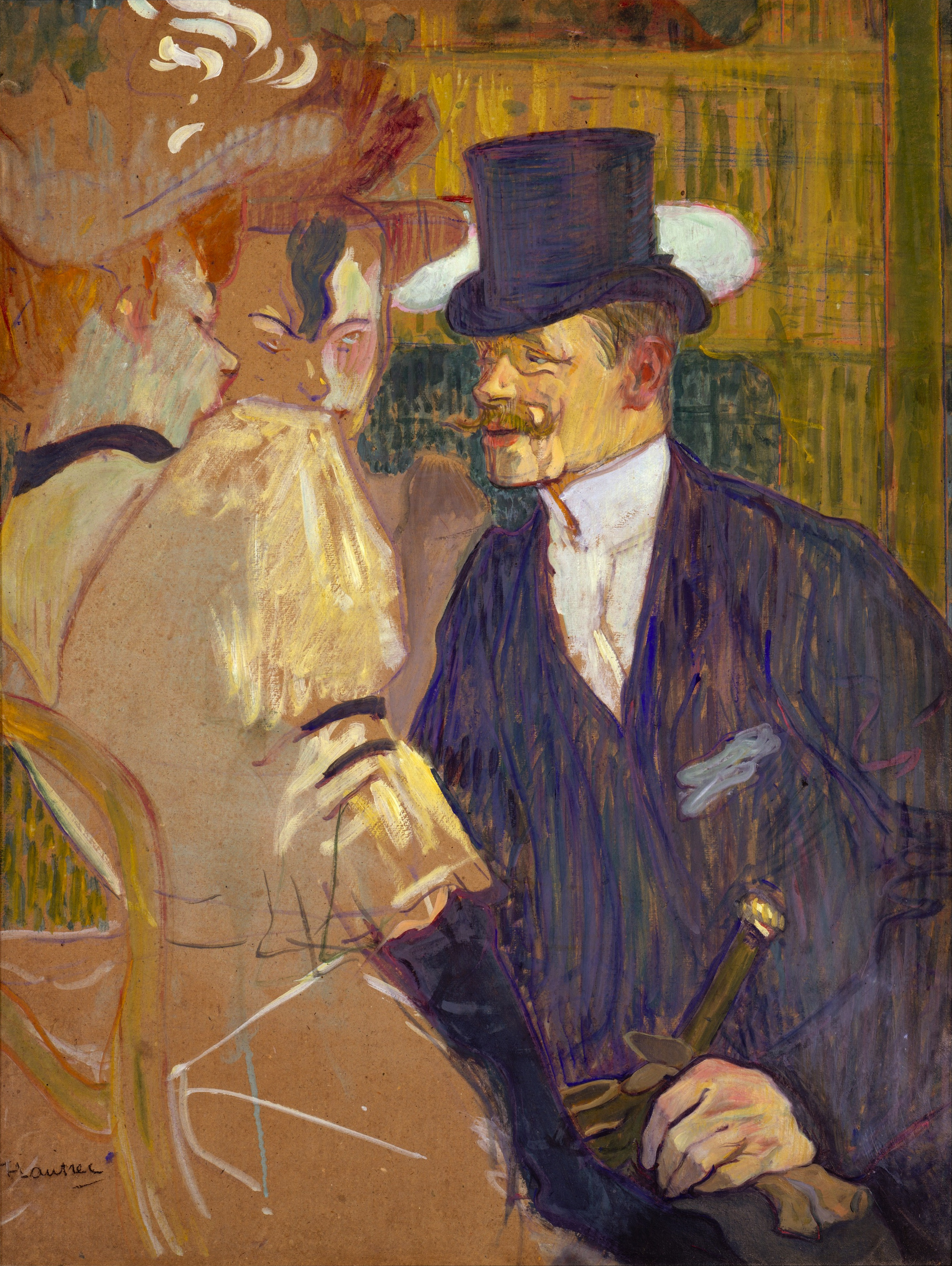
- Artist: Henri de Toulouse-Lautrec
- Year: 1892
- Medium: Oil on cardboard
- Subject: William T. Warrener
- Dimensions: 85.7 cm × 66 cm (33.7 in × 26 in)
- Location: Metropolitan Museum of Art; New York City
- Accession: 67.187.108

The Englishman at the Moulin Rouge is a late-19th-century painting by French artist Henri de Toulouse-Lautrec. Done in oil on cardboard, the work depicts British artist William T. Warrener – a close friend of Lautrec – and two women at the Moulin Rouge cabaret in Paris. The painting served as a preparatory study for a color lithograph of 1892, and is in the collection of the Metropolitan Museum of Art, which acquired it in 1967.
