= Lincoln College of Art =

Former art school in Lincoln, England

Coordinates: 53.23247°N 0.53464°W

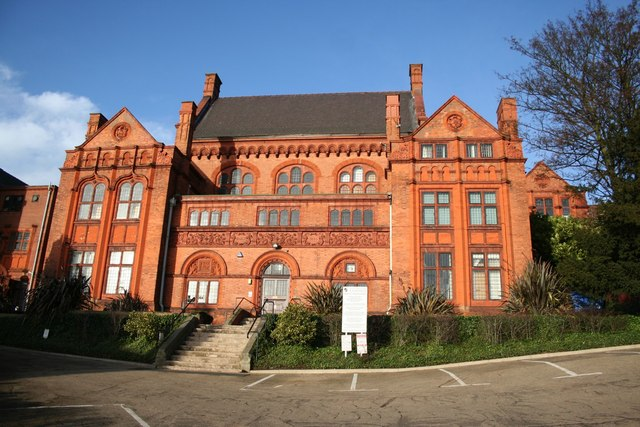
Lincoln College of Art or School of Art

The Lincoln College of Art was an educational institution devoted to the arts, based in the English city of Lincoln with its origins in the mid-nineteenth century. The institution changed shape and name numerous times over its history before being absorbed into the University of Lincoln. Midway through the nineteenth century, the then British Government's Department of Science and Art, based in South Kensington, began establishing a network of art schools as a means of promoting and aiding manufacturing. One of the oldest institutions of its kind in Britain, it became one of Britain's leading art schools, and was one of the first to introduce the teaching of the techniques derived from the French School of Impressionism. Many of its students went on to exhibit at the Paris Salon and the Royal Academy. Amongst its alumni are members of the Newlyn School and two Royal Academicians. It also popularised the art and crafts exhibitions in Lincolnshire that became important annual events in the late 19th and early 20th centuries.

== Founding and early years ==
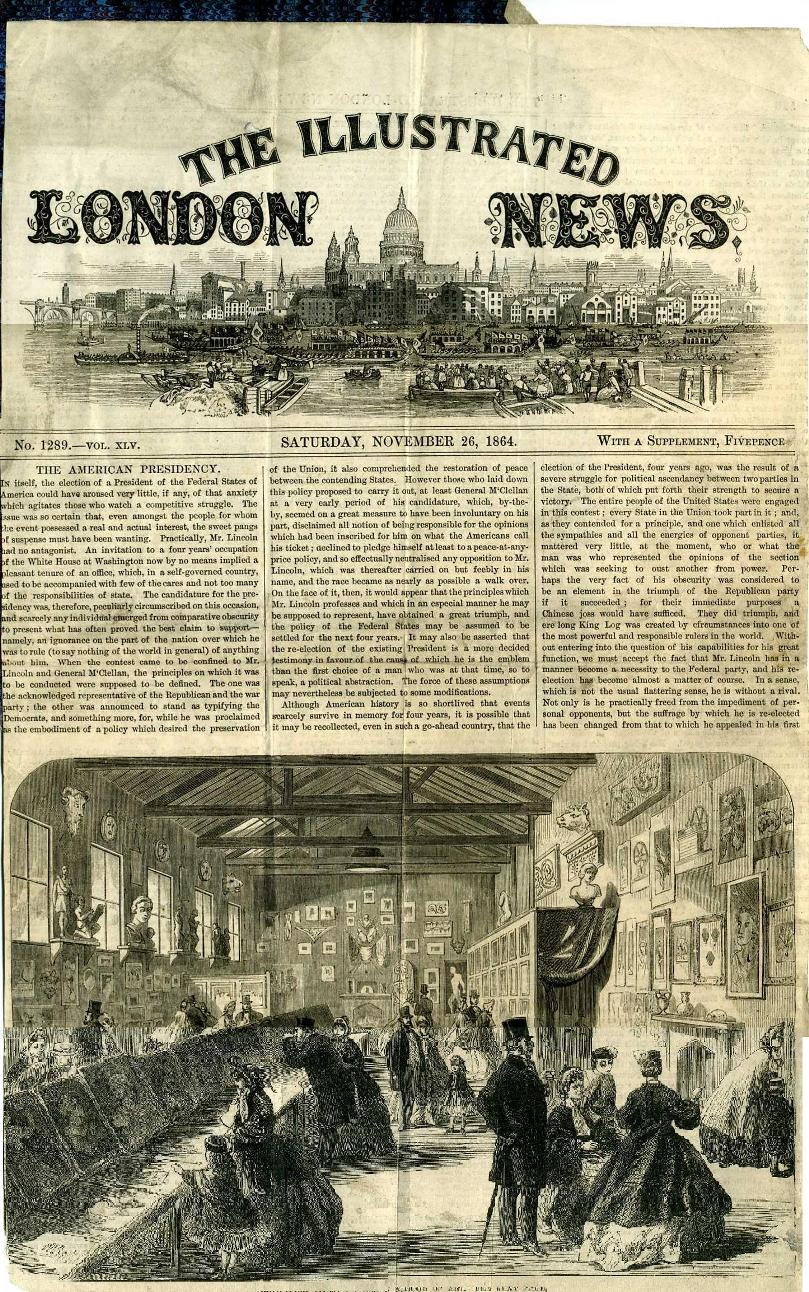
Front page of The Illustrated London News, 26 November 1864, featuring an illustration of an exhibition of students' work.

The Lincoln School of Art has its origins in the art school movement that followed the 1851 Great Exhibition. The School was founded as a private venture, with the support of the Department of Science and Art, on Monday 2 February 1863, in a single room on the Corn Exchange, Lincoln. Its guiding light was John Somerville Gibney, a minor canon of Lincoln Cathedral, and its first headmaster was Edward R. Taylor, founder of Birmingham School of Art and inventor of Ruskin Pottery.

The courses on offer were arranged into three levels: Elementary, Advanced, and Special or Technical. These levels were divided into classes:

1. Elementary: Practical Geometry, Model Drawing, Figure from the Flat, Linear Perspective Free-hand Drawing and Shading, and Elementary Colour;
2. Advanced: Drawing the figure from Casts, Painting: Ornament, Flowers, Landscape, Still Life;
3. Special or Technical: Design, Architectural and Mechanical Drawing, Artistic Anatomy, Modelling.

As a result of the school's success in its first year, new premises were sought for and acquired above the National School for Boys' on the south side of Silver Street. This new school room was opened 10 October 1864, and was of a size to allow its use as an exhibition space. A public exhibit was held in November of that year and proved so popular that the floor had to be re-enforced. With the growth of engineering in Lincoln, there was a need for draughtsmen to produce accurate drawings of machine and engineering parts, and to illustrate catalogues, and so the school offered courses on draughtsmanship. The Rev. Gibney himself became a student by studying the skill of engraving on to copper. He produced his own publication, 'Etchings of Lincoln Cathedral' (1870), using this method.

By 1868 and 1869, the school was ranked in 6th place by the Department of Science and Art, after schools such as Edinburgh and Nottingham. By 1873 there were some 130 schools of art in Britain, and Lincoln was rated in 9th place.

=== Death of Rev. Gibney ===
In 1875, the Rev. J. S. Gibney, the school's honorary secretary since its inception, died when he fell through a skylight. He had been inspecting the roof of the school with a joiner, George Allis, and in particular had been discussing with Allis alterations he wanted made to a skylight, when he began tapping the glass with his right foot, lost his balance, and fell through, down into the model room below. He was supposedly heard to cry out, 'My God', as he fell. The inquest into his death was held at the White Hart Hotel and the jury returned a verdict of accidental death.

Ironically, in a sermon he had delivered to his congregation a few days earlier on Sunday, 3 January, he had spoken of the need to be prepared for sudden death by having all of one's affairs in order. He died intestate.

=== Gibney Art Scholarship ===
In honour of the Rev. Gibney and his work, the school established a scholarship in his name. Awarded to students at the school, its purpose was to allow the successful student to devote his or her time wholly to the cultivation of art. Holders of the Gibney Scholarship have included William Logsdail, Frederick Hall, Frederick William Elwell, May Yeomans (who would go on to be principal at the school), and ceramics artist Robert Blatherwick.

== Rules of the school ==
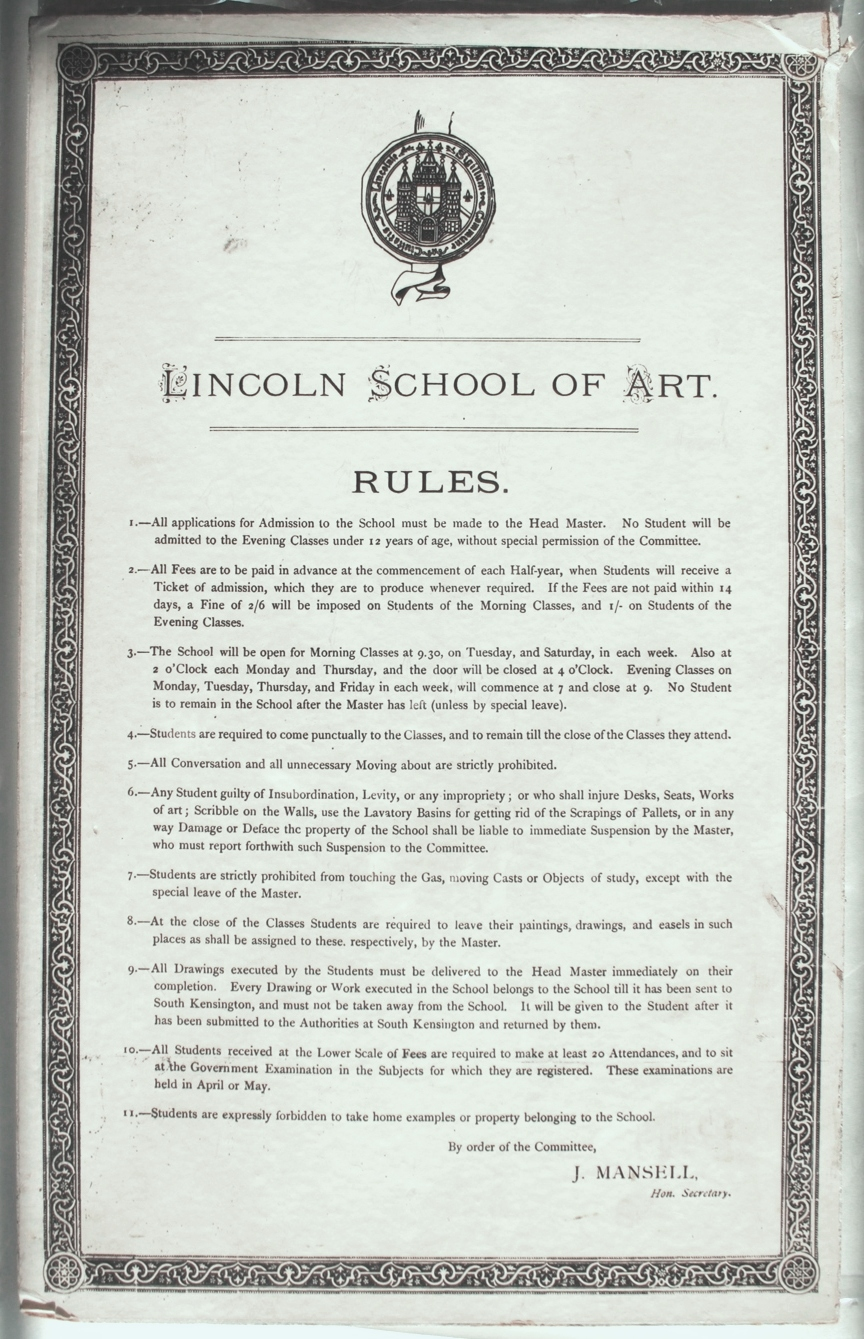
Notice board of the LSA rules of school

During its early years, the committee running the school drew up a list of rules, signed by the Rev. J. Mansell, the Honorary Secretary who succeeded the Rev. Gibney in 1875.

== Controversy ==
By the late 1880s, the school was teaching Greek art and using classically based subject matter, as well as importing the then new idiom of Impressionism.

The painter and Royal Academician John Callcott Horsley, attending the annual prize-giving in April, 1890, criticised the school for teaching its students such techniques found in the French school of painting, to the detriment of the English school. He called these techniques a 'fad' and one of those 'ridiculous crazes' that had been imported from Paris. He then went on to expand his criticism to schools of art in general, which he called 'the greatest possible misfortune' to British art (although he did make an exception with Lincoln).

Alfred G. Webster, the then principal of the school, replied in an open letter published in the Lincoln Gazette, expressing the belief that discoveries and ideas from abroad ought not to be disregarded simply as a result of their foreign origins. He pointed out that Britons, Normans, and Saxons all 'had the misfortune to be foreigners', and that the English School had been founded on the practises of Hans Holbein, Anthony van Dyck, and Peter Paul Rubens, all foreigners.

== School of Science and Art ==
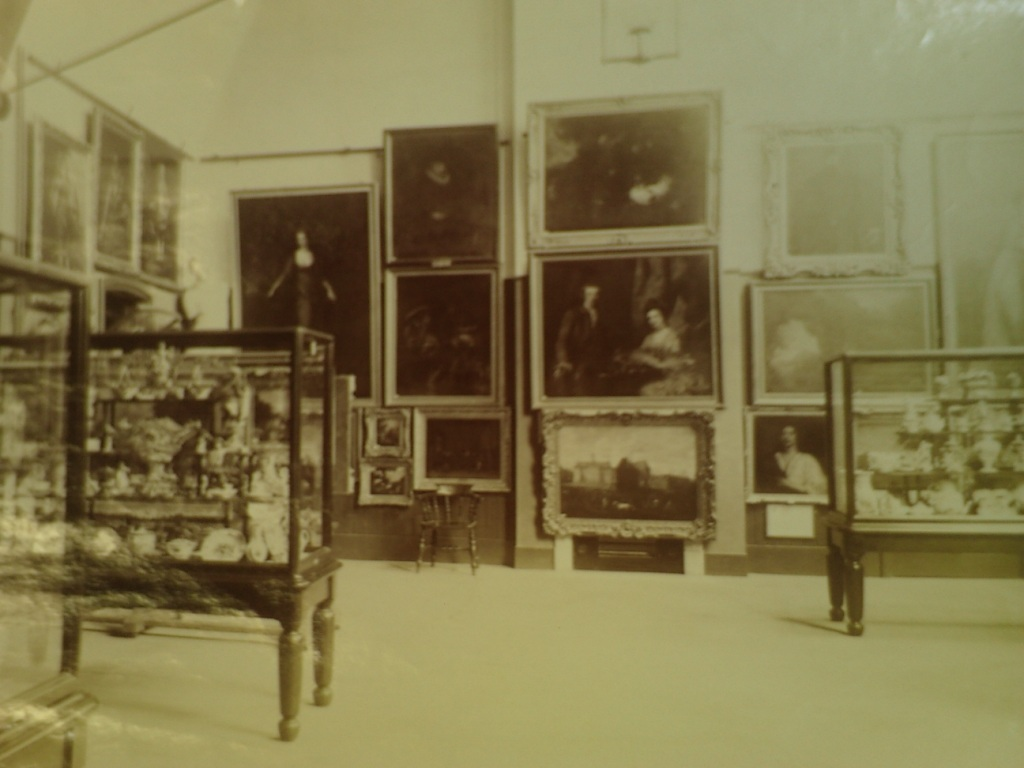
Fine Art Exhibition held at the Lincoln School of Art on Monks Road in 1887, most likely in the Painting Room on the first floor.

The School moved to premises on Monks Road in 1886, where it became one-half of a 'School of Science and Art', with its own principal and organising committee. The ground floor was home to the Science School (except for the Modelling Room), with shared use of the Lecture Theatre and the Porters' Room, while the Art School was based on the first floor, with shared use of the Committee and Secretary's Rooms. Both floors had rooms for the respective schools' masters. The Basement had two bedrooms and a living room, and was shared use, except that the Science School used the Laboratory and Balance Room. The Science School increased in size and added a technical wing to the Monks Road premises in 1891, a reflection of the rise of industry in Lincoln in general, which was further demonstrated in an article from the Lincoln Gazette, dated 1897, which described a conversazione at the combined school in 1897, during which x-rays, glass-blowing, and a cinematograph were exhibited. Of twelve paragraphs, only one is devoted to the art school. In 1901 the combined school was renamed the City of Lincoln Municipal Technical School, and then the Lincoln Technical College in 1928.

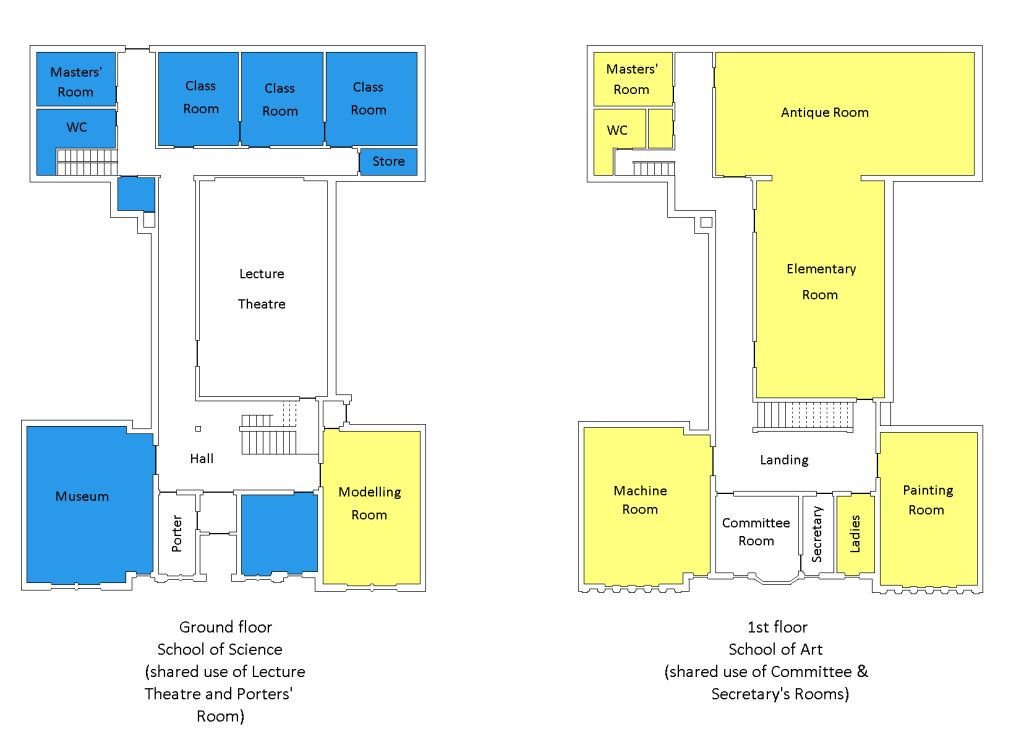
Basic floor plans of the ground and first floors of the Lincoln Schools of Science and Art, based on Monks Road, around 1888. Sketch by Duncan Scott Mackenzie.

The School of Art had originally been supported by the Department of Science and Art, South Kensington. With the department's closure in 1899, the school lost that support and so was eventually absorbed into the Technical College, under the authority of the Lincoln Education Authority, where it effectively ceased to be a private venture and an independent educational institution.

The School remained part of the Technical College for the next six decades. The range of subjects taught widened during this time to include (along with the more traditional subjects) costume, typography, lettering, metalwork and silver-smithing, dress design, and bookcraft, in keeping with headmaster Austin Garland's statement that the students be 'taught to make things, and to bring artistic methods to bear upon the problems of everyday life'. In 1948, the Royal Institute of British Architects (R.I.B.A.) recognised the school as an approved centre for training up to the intermediary standard.

Pottery was also taught at the school. Lincolnshire ceramics artist Robert Blatherwick, who had studied at the school, returned to teach there (after making pots for Michael Cardew at Winchcombe and Bernard Leach in St Ives), from the early forties to the late sixties.

In 1950, a report by His Majesty's Inspectors criticised the 'inadequate' accommodation and stated that this 'handicapped' the students. They also stated that the school was understaffed, with full-time staff sometimes having to supervise more than one group at a time. During the 1937–38 academic year, the school's students numbered 251 (including part-time and evening classes), while by 1949–50, that number had grown to 415 students.

== Christ's Hospital Terrace ==
The School was transferred to the Bluecoat School building on Christ's Hospital Terrace in 1957, where it regained some of its independence from the technical college, which became the Lincoln College of Technology in the 1970s and developed into the present Lincoln College, Lincolnshire.

=== 1958 fire ===
In May, 1958, a fire broke out in the west wing of the School of Art. Although the damage to the building was light, many art works were destroyed.

== Lincoln College of Art ==
By the mid-1970s, the official name of the school had been changed to the Lincoln College of Art. In 1975, the college's administration was moved to the old Girl's High School building, now called the Greestone Building, on Lindum Road.

At this time, a number of influential figures emerged amongst the teaching staff, both locally and nationally. The principal, Peter Williams (1936–2005), described by The Guardian newspaper as both an artist and art educationist, also held the post of Art Advisor to the City of Lincoln Authority. He would go on to become a prime mover and founding director of the Kent Institute of Art & Design.

Artist Gill Nadin (1928–1996) taught at the college. The Lincolnshire Artists' Society instituted an art prize in her name. Another notable lecturer at the college was the Czech emigre artist Tony Bartl (1912–1998) who was appointed in 1948.

Between 1970 and 1980, the ceramics artist Peter Moss was head of department and a college governor. He went on to be acting principal and then vice-principal when the college became Lincolnshire College of Art. He was also a consultant and part-time and visiting lecturer for most of its time as part of De Montfort University.

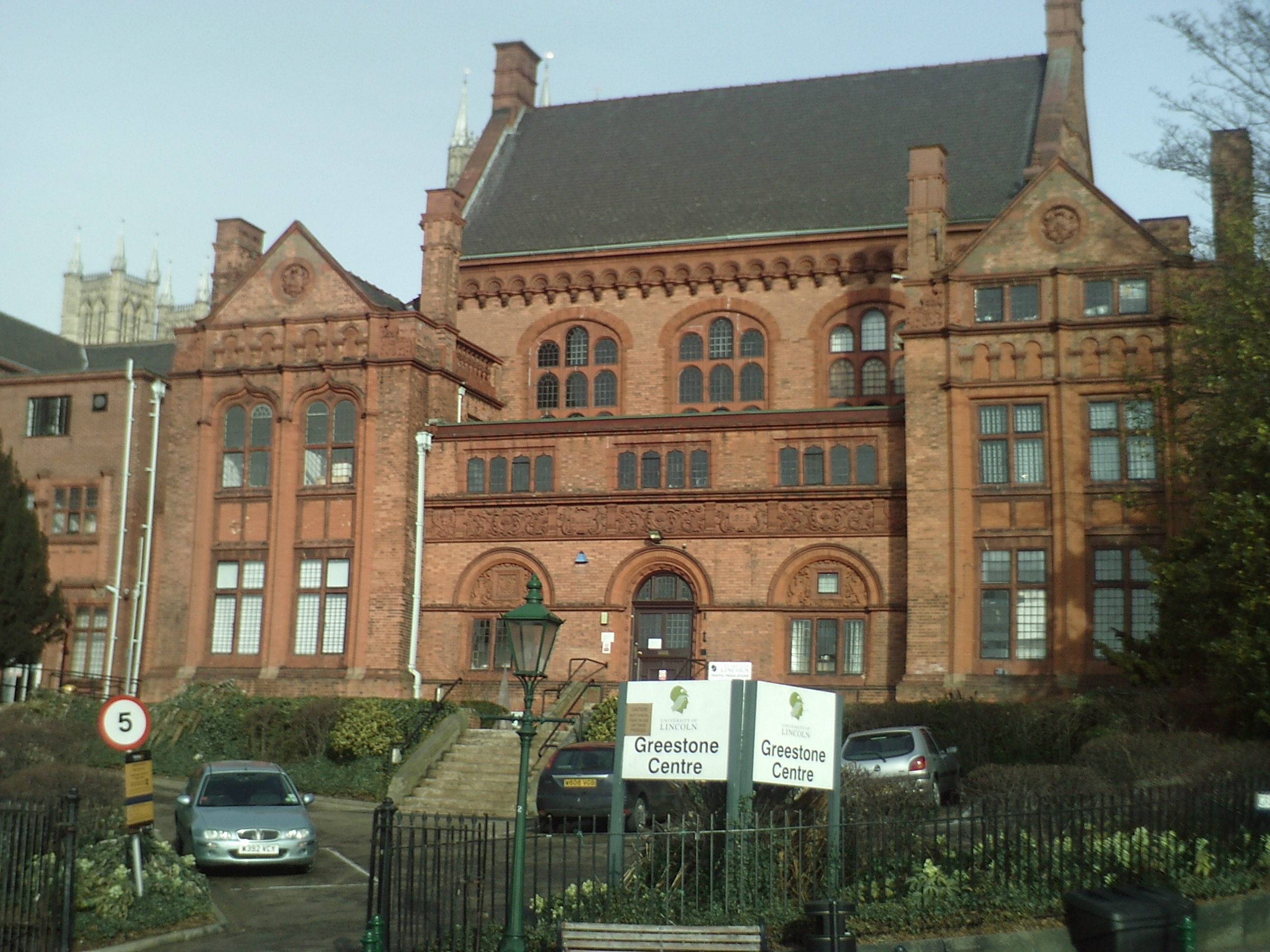
Greestone Building on Lindum Road

=== Lincolnshire College of Art & Design ===
In the early 1980s, another name change turned the college into the Lincolnshire College of Art & Design.

By this time, the college was based in three buildings: the Greestone Building, Christ's Hospital Terrace, and the Gibney Centre on Monks Road. The latter used the façade of what had once been the City of Lincoln Municipal Technical School, where the School of Art had been joined with the School of Science.

In an interview on BBC Radio 4's Front Row in May 2014, the celebrated ceramic artist and author of The Hare with Amber Eyes, Edmund de Waal, stated that when he was five years old, he was taken to a ceramics evening class at the college where he discovered ceramics.

In 1993, Lincolnshire College of Art & Design was ranked 7th in the Guardian's league table for further education colleges.

=== 1991 Lindum Road fire ===
A fire broke out on the upper floor of the general office building in 1991. The staff inside, unaware of the flames, were alerted by staff in the British Telecom building nearby who had noticed the smoke. There were no fatalities, but the damage was estimated to be between £50,000 and £100,000. The Lens Media Unit, which had just purchased a multi-format DeVere 504 Colour Enlarger, was rendered inoperable and was not re-opened until January, 1992.

== Later years ==
The Lincolnshire College of Art was incorporated into De Montfort University, in 1994, where it became known as the School of Art & Design.

=== De Montfort University ===
During this period, the work of the school – both of its tutors and students – achieved a wider recognition. Tutor and fine art artist Medina Hammad exhibited in Sudan, by invitation by the University of Khartoum. The exhibition attracted both radio and television coverage in that country. Alison Read, a member of staff in printmaking but with an interest in sculpture, was commissioned by Lord Jacob Rothschild to produce a sculpture of five running dogs, while BA Graphic Design and Illustration student Neil Aldridge won in the Communications category: 'Postage Stamps' of the RSA Student Design Awards. The brief was 'British Obsession: The Weather'. His entry also appeared on the front page of The Times Higher Education Supplement for 15 May. In 1997 Ben Terrett also a BA Graphic Design and Illustration student won an RSA Student Design Award.

In January 1999, selected student work was accorded the rare honour of being exhibited at the Mercury Gallery, Cork Street, London, as part of its Young Printmakers' exhibition.

=== University of Lincoln ===
By the 2000s, De Montfort University's expansion beyond Leicester had ended and the university was selling all of its outlying campuses, including Lincoln. In 2001, the School of Art was divided in two, between Lincoln College, which took many of the FE (Further Education) art courses, and the University of Lincoln, which took the HE (Higher Education) art courses.

As part of the University of Lincoln, the school was incorporated as the Lincoln School of Art and Design, within the College of Art. The University of Lincoln's College of Art has later since been reorganised and provision from the original Lincoln College of Art is now spread across schools within the University of Lincoln's College of Art.

== 150th Anniversary Year ==
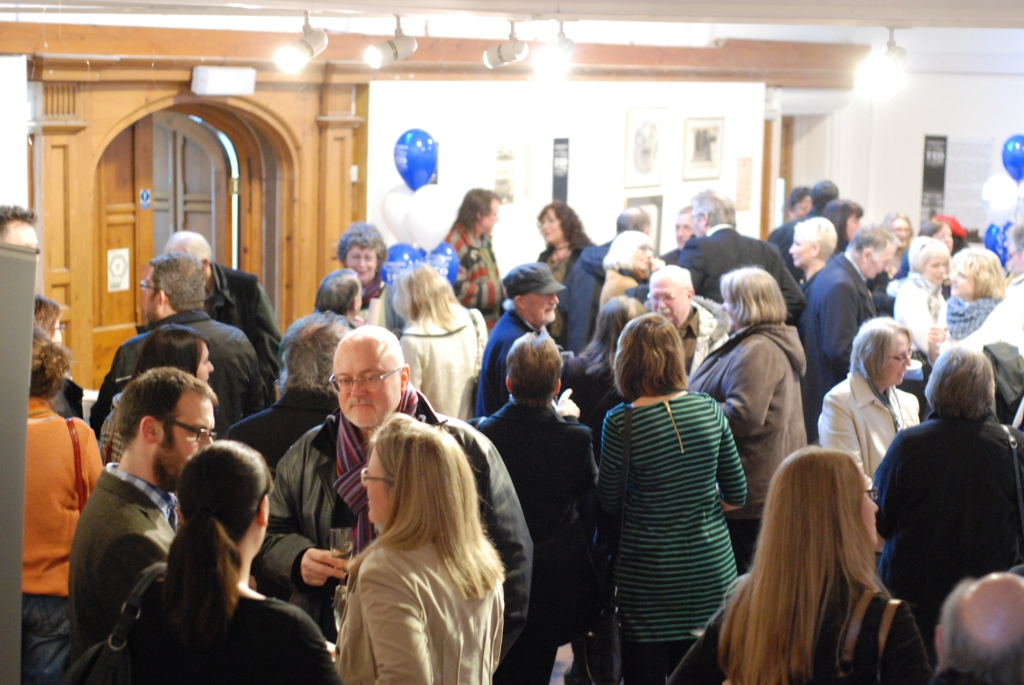
LSA 150th Anniversary Exhibition opening night party, Feb. 2013.

The year 2013 marked the 150th anniversary of the founding of the school. As part of the celebrations, the University of Lincoln held an exhibition entitled Lincoln School of Art: A Celebration of 150 Years in the gallery of the Greestone Building. The exhibition featured prospectuses dating from as far back as 1947, nineteenth-century works by students, a video of a cricket match and picnic dating from July, 1979, and a selection of student art from the university's own art collection. The opening was held on Saturday, 2 February, exactly 150 years to the day the school opened and was attended by many ex-staff and students.

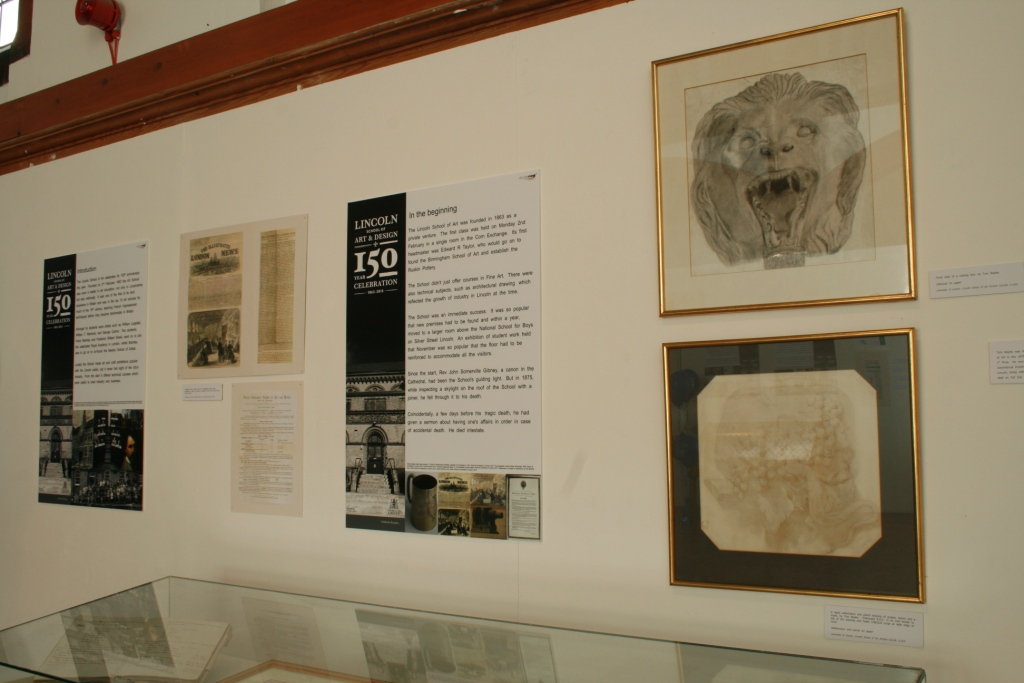
Part of the 'Lincoln School of Art: A Celebration of 150 Years' Exhibition, held in February, 2013. Featuring works by 19th Century student Tom Bayles and information panels by Duncan Scott Mackenzie.

One month later, an exhibition of art from the school was opened at The Collection (Lincolnshire), in the Usher Gallery, entitled Past and Present: A Celebration of the 150th Anniversary of the Lincoln School of Art. Works by artists including William Logsdail, George Francis Carline, Frank Bramley, as well as paintings by the school's headmasters including Alfred G. Webster, were displayed.

These were followed by a series of events, including talks and free lectures. A series of conferences, held by the University of Lincoln, was run, entitled LSA&D in Session: Speculations on the 21st Century Art School, addressing the role and function of the modern art school. It was in collaboration with the Royal Society of Arts and the Lincoln Academy.

== Notable alumni ==
- Gordon Baldwin, OBE, ceramics artist (born 1932)
- Emily Beatrice Bland, painter of still-life and landscapes (1864–1951)
- Frank Bramley, Royal Academician, Newlyn School painter (1857–1915)
- George Francis Carline, portrait and landscape painter (1855–1920)
- Mary Henrietta Dering Curtois, painter (1854–1929)
- Frederick William Elwell, Royal Academician, painter (1870–1958)
- Frederick Hall, Newlyn School painter and caricaturist (1860–1948)
- James Valentine Jelley, landscape and still life painter (1857–1950)
- William Logsdail, architectural and portrait painter (1859–1944)
- Rose Mead, portrait painter (1867–1946)
- William T. Warrener, painter (1861–1934)

== Principals/heads of school ==
- Edward R. Taylor, 1863–77
- Alfred G. Webster, 1877–1916
- May Yeomans (Acting Head of School), 1916–20
- Austin Garland, AMC, ANSAM, 1920–47
- J. Marchbank Salmon, DA (Edin.), 1947–60
- Kenneth Gribble, DFA (Lond.), FRSA, 1960–67
- Arthur W. H. Pears, ATD, 1967–70
- Peter I. Williams, DFA (Lond.), 1970–83
- Derrick Hawker, ATD, NDD, FRSA, 1983–94

As part of De Montfort University:

- Derrick Hawker, ATD, NDD, FRSA, 1994–95
- Lynne Staley-Brookes (Acting Head of School), 1995
- Vincent Shacklock, 1995–2001

As part of the University of Lincoln:

- Alec Shepley, PhD, FRSA, 2008–14
- Anne Chick, FRSA (Acting Head of School), 2014
- Matthew Cragoe, DPhil, FRHistS, 2014–present
