= Frederick Brown (artist) =

English painter (1851–1941)

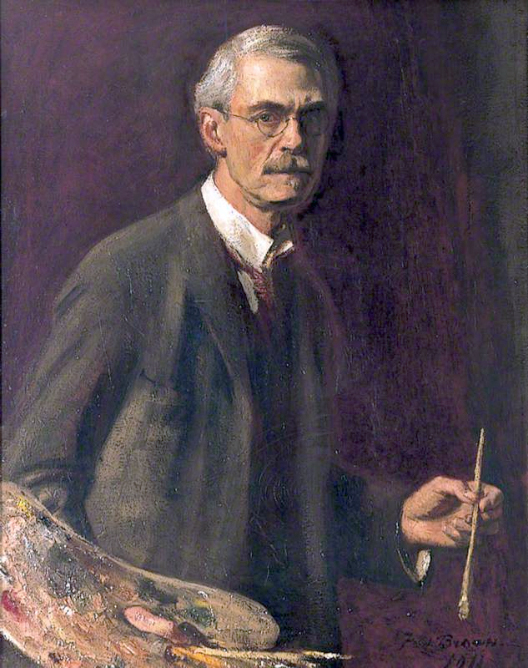
Self portrait (1911)

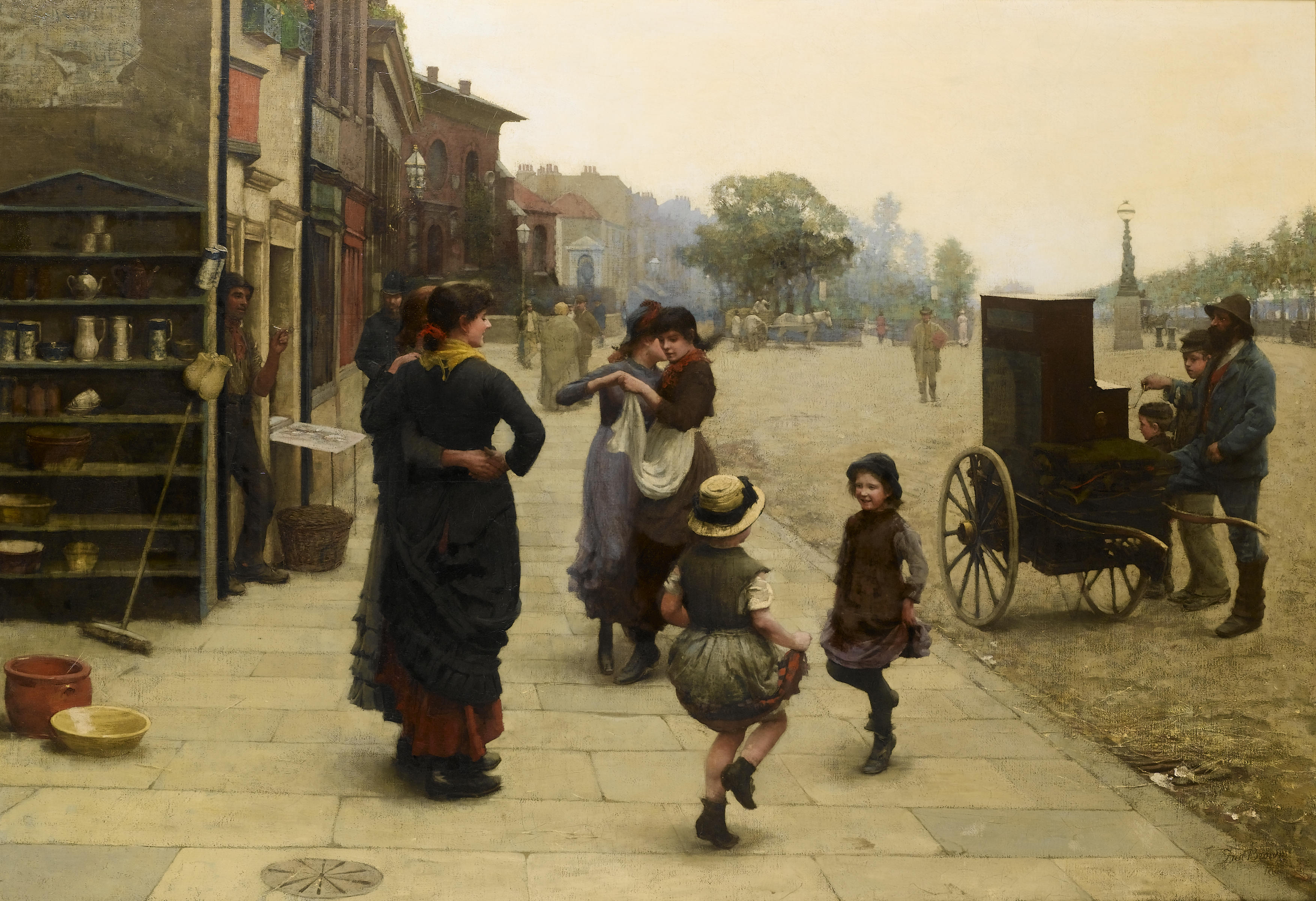
Frederick Brown: An impromptu dance - a scene on the Chelsea Embankment, 1883

Frederick Brown (14 March 1851, in Chelmsford – 8 January 1941, in Richmond) was a British art teacher and painter.

Brown studied from 1868 to 1877 at the National Art Training School, London (later the Royal College of Art). He later studied at the Académie Julian in Paris in the winter of 1886 with William Bouguereau. His work was influenced by Jules Bastien-Lepage. His portrait style was influenced by Whistler.

Brown was a founder of the New English Art Club in 1886 and author of its constitution.

From 1877 to 1892 he was headmaster of the Westminster School of Art; where his students included Aubrey Beardsley, Henry Tonks, Frederick Pegram and Francis Job Short.

From 1893 to 1918 he was Slade Professor of Art. Augustus John, William Orpen, Alfred Garth Jones, Lilian Lancaster, Emily Beatrice Bland, Ethel Carrick, Wyndham Lewis, Eileen Gray and Henry Charles Brewer studied under Brown during his tenure.
