= Frederick William Elwell =

English painter (1870–1958)

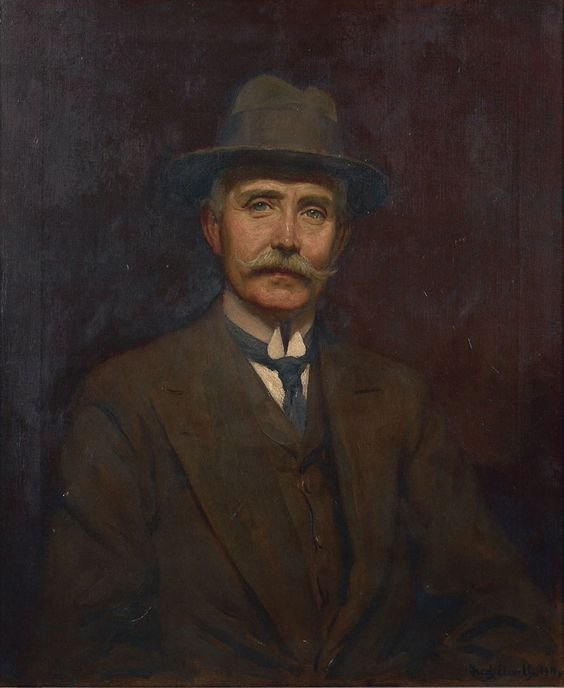
- self-portrait, 1911
- Born: 29 June 1870; Beverley
- Died: 3 January 1958 (aged 87); Beverley
- Occupation: Painter
- Spouse(s): Mary Dawson Elwell

Frederick William Elwell RA (29 June 1870 in Beverley, East Riding of Yorkshire – 3 January 1958 in Beverley, East Riding of Yorkshire) was an English painter in oils of portraits, interiors and figurative subjects. He exhibited at the Paris Salon and the Royal Academy, where he became a member in 1938, and painted a portrait of King George V in 1932.

== Career ==
Frederick Elwell was born in Beverley, East Riding of Yorkshire, the son of wood carver James Edward Elwell. He studied at the Lincoln School of Art. Here he became interested in French Impressionism. In 1887 he was granted a scholarship which made it possible for him to dedicate himself fully to his artistic studies. In 1889 he became a student \at the Royal Academy of Fine Arts in Antwerp, where the Flemish portrait painter Pieter Van Havermaet was one of his teachers. At the Antwerp Academy he further developed his skill and interest in portraiture and still life developed under the influence of the work of 17th century Dutch and Flemish artists. Then followed a further period of study at the Académie Julian in Paris after which he returned to London.

He first exhibited at the Paris Salon in 1894 and at the Royal Academy in 1895.

He was elected to the Royal Society of Portrait Painters in 1931, and in 1938, he was elected as a member of the Royal Academy. He was also a member of the Royal Institute of Oil Painters.

Much of his work, practised in a vigorous and realistic style, expressed his interest in recording Yorkshire life. The Times, in its review of the Royal Academy exhibition of 1936, favourably described his painting, The Lying-in-State, Westminster Hall (1936), as successfully conveying the emotions felt by those who had been present at the lying-in-state of the late King George V. Some 22 years later, the same newspaper described his work as 'persuasive' rather than 'arresting', and him as 'pre-eminently a painter of domesticity'.

Amongst the purchasers of his works were the Chantrey Bequest, the City of Hull and the Walker Art Gallery, Liverpool.

== Personal life ==
Elwell was the youngest of six children. His father, James Elwell, was a cabinet maker and wood carver, who was twice mayor of Beverley. He lived for a short time in London, and then returned to Beverley in 1903, where in 1914 he married Mary Dawson Bishop (1874–1952), a painter of landscapes and interiors and widow of Elwell's friend, oil broker George Alfred Holmes (died 5 August 1913). They lived at Beverley Bar, for many years. Mary's secure financial position allowed Fred to travel abroad and paint continental landscapes. He was made a freeman of Beverley, where he composed many of his works. As a pastime, he enjoyed gardening.

Elwell produced more than 500 paintings and continued to work until shortly before his death.

== Selected paintings ==
• The Last Purchase • The Beverley Arms Kitchen (1919) • The Old Library, Castle Ashby (1927) • The Earl and Countess of Strathmore and Kinghorne in their Drawing-room at Glamis (1932) • Portrait of King George V (1932) • Man with a Pint (1933) • The Lying-in-State, Westminster Hall (1936) • The First Born (1913)
