= Longcroft School =

School in the East Riding of Yorkshire, England

Longcroft School and Sixth Form College

Location
- Burton Road; Molescroft, East Riding of Yorkshire, HU17 7EJ; England; 53°51′02″N 00°26′53″W

Information
- Type: Community school
- Motto: Integrity Creativity Respect
- Established: Official opening on 9 May 1951
- Department for Education URN: 118073 Tables
- Ofsted: Reports
- Age: 11 to 18
- Enrolment: approx. 1,200 as of 2016
- Website: http://www.longcroftschool.co.uk/

Longcroft School and Sixth Form College is a community secondary school situated in Molescroft, East Riding of Yorkshire, England. Its catchment area covers the north of Beverley, Leconfield, Swinemoor and Molescroft and has a capacity of around 1,500 pupils, including the Sixth Form.

== History ==
Longcroft School opened as a purpose designed Secondary School in 1949, initially with 304 pupils. The second phase of the building was completed in September 1950, bringing the total of the school roll up to 708. The school was designed by Mr K. F. Giraud, the County Architect. The official opening of the school was held on 9 May 1951. A new building for a Junior Department or Lower School was opened in January 1958 for children ages 11–13. In 2001 it was accredited with the specialist status of a Performing Arts College (re-accredited in 2006 and 2009), which brought with it the funds to increase class-room space, develop a fully working theatre in the school hall and extend links to the wider community and feeder primary schools. In more recent years, Longcroft acquired funding from the East Riding of Yorkshire Council and the Football Foundation to build a new sports hall and all-weather pitch. The facilities available at the school are used by many community groups and organisations during evenings, at weekends and during school holidays. The school changed its name to Longcroft School at some time between 2009 and 2012, as it was no longer a Performing Arts College. In 2015 it changed names again to become Longcroft School and Sixth Form College.

== Location ==
Longcroft School is situated in Molescroft on the northern outskirts of Beverley, the campus being surrounded by countryside, the Beverley Westwood and Beverley Racecourse. The school had two main buildings, known as the Lower School (Years 7 and 8) and Upper School (Years 9, 10 and 11) up until 2019 when a planned development project was completed meaning that the former upper school now had capacity for pupils from all years. The Arts and Science Block, where the Sixth Form is based (years 12 and 13), has been attached to the Upper School in recent years by additional classrooms and learning spaces. The site is over 50 acres and includes open spaces for sporting activities.

== Motto ==
In his History of the Anglo-Saxons, Sir Francis Palgrave (1788–1861) wrote that King Athelstan, who had prayed at the tomb of St John of Beverley before success in a battle (937 AD), showed his gratitude by giving privileges to the town of Beverley, saying: "As free make I thee, as heart may think, or eye may see". The quote was adopted as Longcroft’s motto.

== Gospel choir ==
Founded and directed by Jonathan Chapman, the Longcroft Gospel Choir is well known in the local area, and regularly performs at parties, ceremonies, weddings and music concerts. The choir comprises students from Year 9 and above and has a large repertoire of music. Over the choir's period of existence, the choir has performed at venues such as Disneyland Paris and the Apple Store on Oxford Street, London, have released two of their own albums and have featured on a track by singer songwriter Henry Priestman. In May 2015, it was announced that the Longcroft Gospel Choir will be one of twenty choirs in the UK to perform at and open the 2015 Rugby World Cup in London performing for the home team (England).
