= Frank Bramley =

English painter (1857–1915)

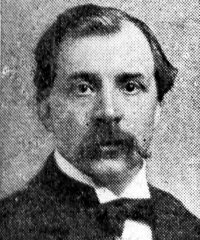
- Self portrait (1897)
- Born: 6 May 1857; Sibsey, Lincolnshire, England
- Died: 9 August 1915 (aged 58); Chalford Hill, Gloucestershire, England
- Education: Lincoln School of Art, Royal Academy of Fine Arts (Antwerp)
- Known for: Painter
- Movement: Newlyn School, Post-Impressionism
- Spouse: Katherine Graham Bramley

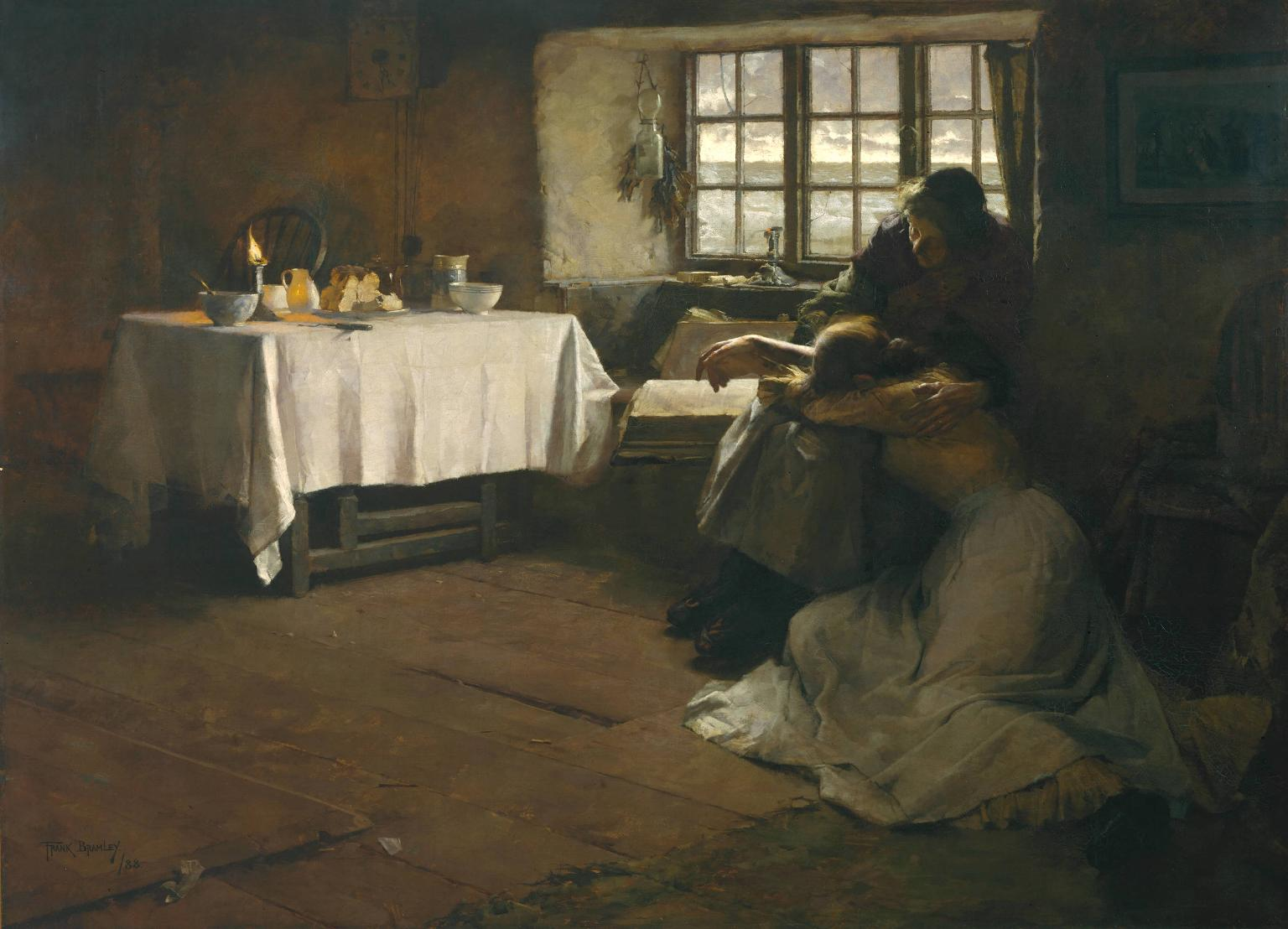
A Hopeless Dawn, 1888, oil on canvas

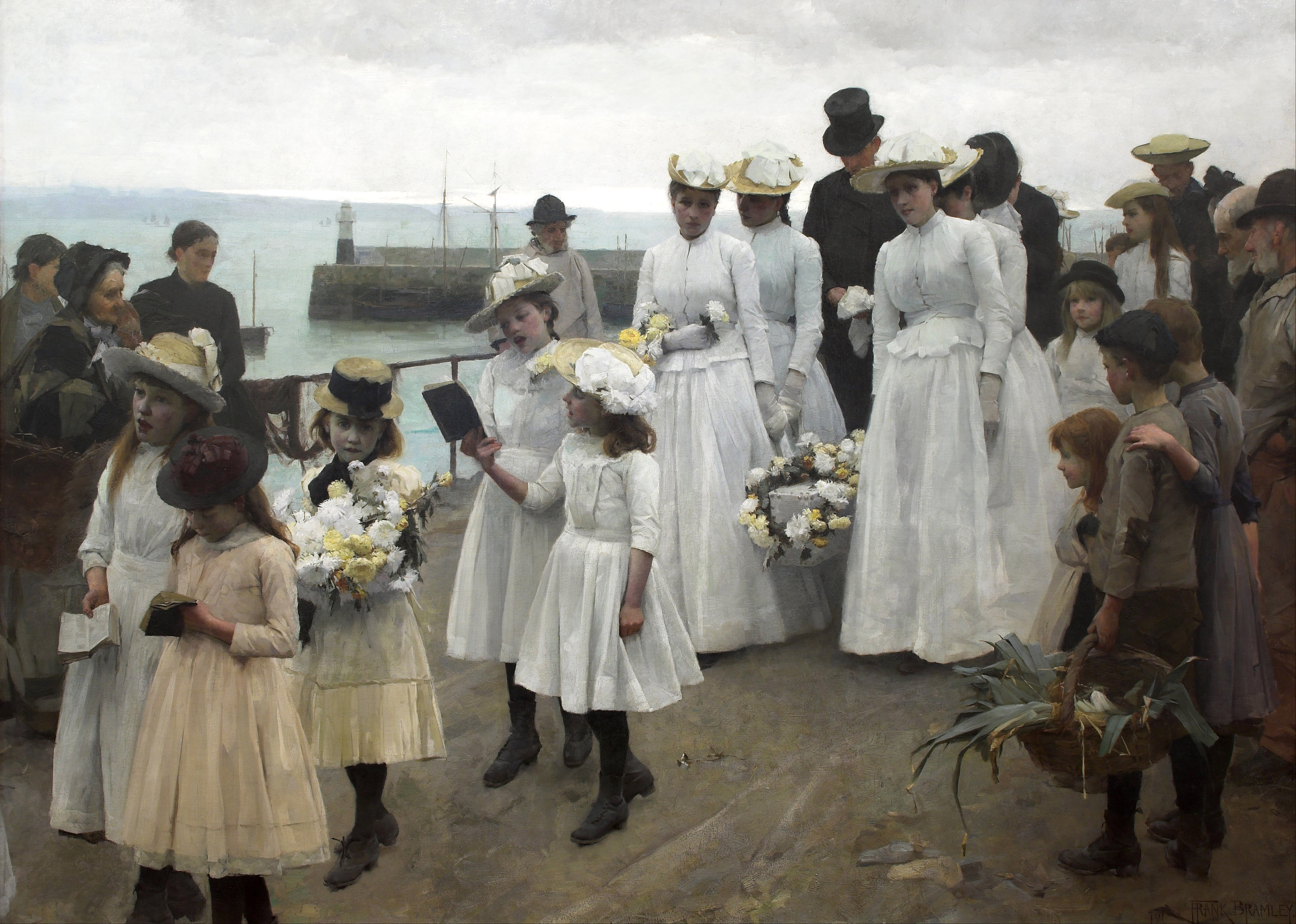
Kingdom of Heaven (1891)

Frank Bramley RA (6 May 1857 – 9 August 1915) (Note: Encyclopædia Britannica and Penlee House give the date of death as 10 August 1915.) was an English post-impressionist genre painter of the Newlyn School.

== Personal life ==
Bramley was born in Sibsey, near Boston, in Lincolnshire to Charles Bramley from Fiskerton also in Lincolnshire.

From 1873 to 1878 Bramley studied at the Lincoln School of Art. He then studied from 1879 to 1882 at the Royal Academy of Fine Arts in Antwerp, where Charles Verlat was his instructor. He lived in Venice from 1882 to 1884 and then moved to Newlyn, Cornwall.

Bramley married fellow artist Katherine Graham, daughter of John Graham from Huntingstile, Grasmere, Westmoreland, in 1891. (Note: Catherine St. Clair Graham was born in 1868 in Dursley in Gloucestershire. In 1908 she exhibited 'Launching the Lifeboat' at the Royal Academy. Catherine also exhibited at the 1913 London Salon. She died on 20 January 1954 in Bournemouth.) The couple lived at Orchard Cottage, which at the time was called Belle Vue Cottage, from 1893 to 1897. In 1895 they moved to Droitwich in the West Midlands. They lived at Bellue Vue House in 1889 and by 1900 had settled at Grasmere in the Lake District.

Bramley died in Chalford Hill, Gloucestershire in August 1915.

== Career ==
Having returned to England from Venice in or after 1884, Bramley established himself in the Newlyn School artist colony on Rue des Beaux Arts in Newlyn. Along with Walter Langley and Stanhope Forbes, he was considered to be one of the "leading figures" of the Newlyn School.

In contrast to other members of the Newlyn school, Bramley specialised in interiors and worked on combining natural and artificial light in his paintings, such as A Hopeless Dawn.

During his time in Newlyn, Bramley was a particular exponent of the ‘square brush technique’, using the flat of a square brush to lay the paint on the canvas in a jigsaw pattern of brush strokes, giving a particular vibrancy to the paint surface. In the early 1890s, his palette became brighter and his handling of the paint looser and more impastoed, while his subject matter narrowed to portraits and rural genre paintings.

An example of Bramley's use of the square brush technique is his painting Domino!

His A Hopeless Dawn (1888) is held by the Tate Gallery, London after having been purchased for the nation by the Chantrey Bequest and is one of Bramley's most favored works. Praised by the Royal Academy, Penlee House also appreciate this Bramley work: "The painting’s strong emotional and narrative content, together with its aesthetic appeal and tonal harmony, make this one of the most admired Newlyn School works to this day." The young grieving woman in the painting, artist model Effy Reynolds James. The painting was referenced in an April 2010 General Conference address by President of the Church of Jesus Christ of Latter-day Saints, Thomas S. Monson.

Bramley was one of the founders of the New English Art Club, but left the organization after having received condemning comments from Walter Sickert.

In 1894 Bramley became an Associate of the Royal Academy (ARA) and in 1911 he became a Royal Academician (RA). He was also a gold medal winner at the Paris Salon.

== Exhibitions ==
- 1884 - 1912: Royal Academy
- 1890: Domino, Dowdeswell Exhibition

== Works ==
Selected paintings include:

- A Venetian Market Girl, 1883.
- Primrose Day, 1885.
- Everyone His Own Tale, 1885.
- Domino, 1886.
- Eyes and No Eyes, 1887.
- A Hopeless Dawn, 1888.
- Saved, 1889.
- For of Such is the Kingdom of Heaven, 1891.
- Old Memories, 1892.
- After Fifty Years, 1893.
- Sleep, A Portrait of Mrs. Bolitho, 1895.
- After the Storm, 1896.
- Friends, 1907.

== Gallery ==
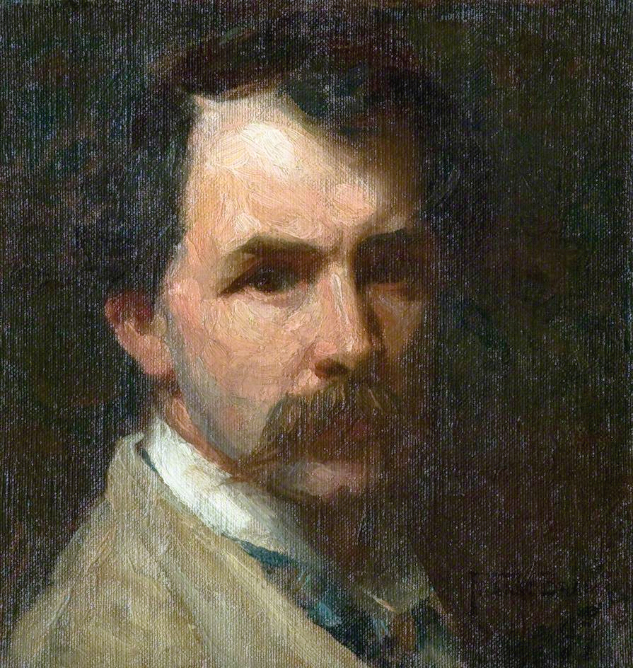
Self portrait, 1897, oil on canvas

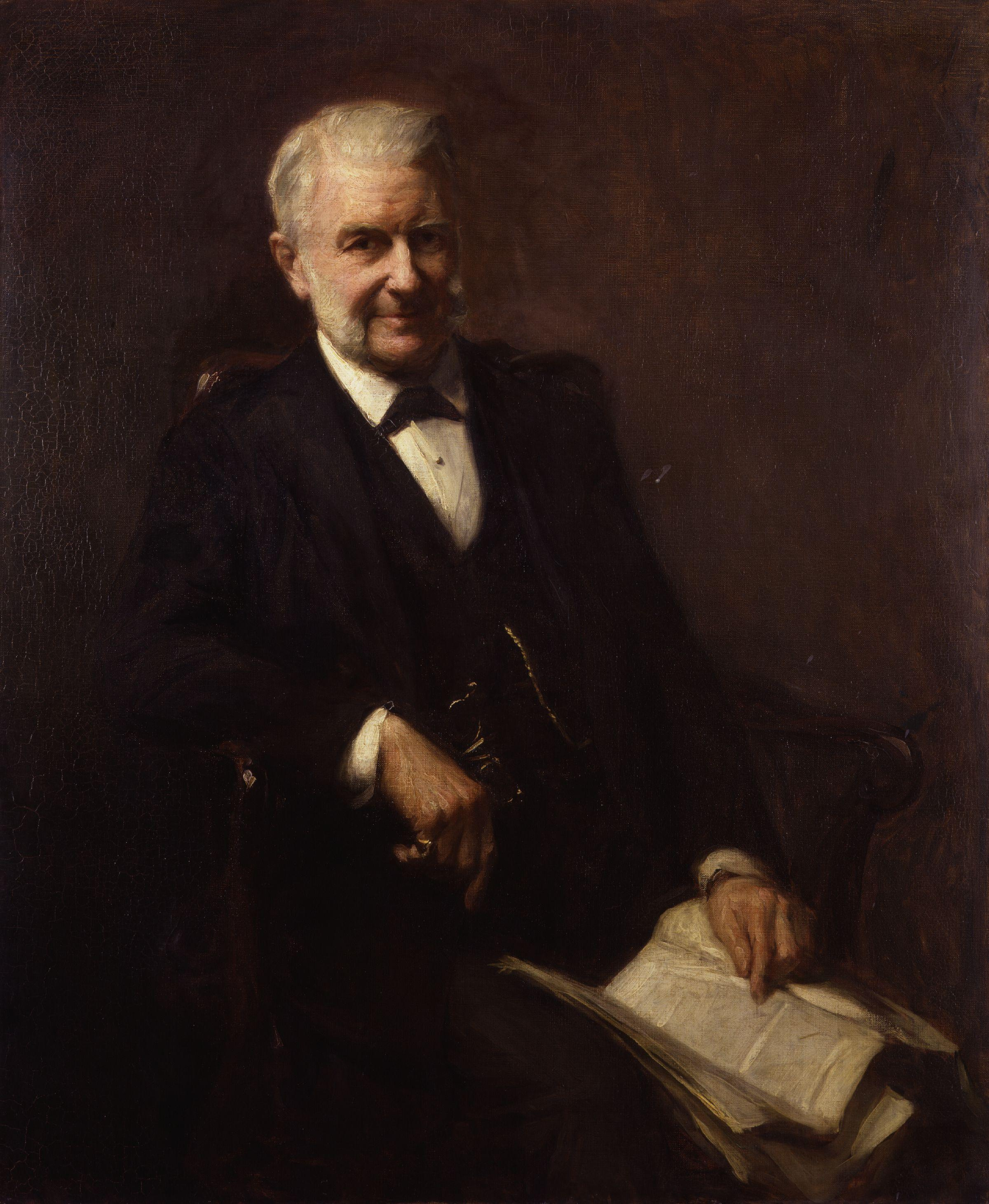
Sir Frederick Augustus Abel, 1st Baronet, National Portrait Gallery, London

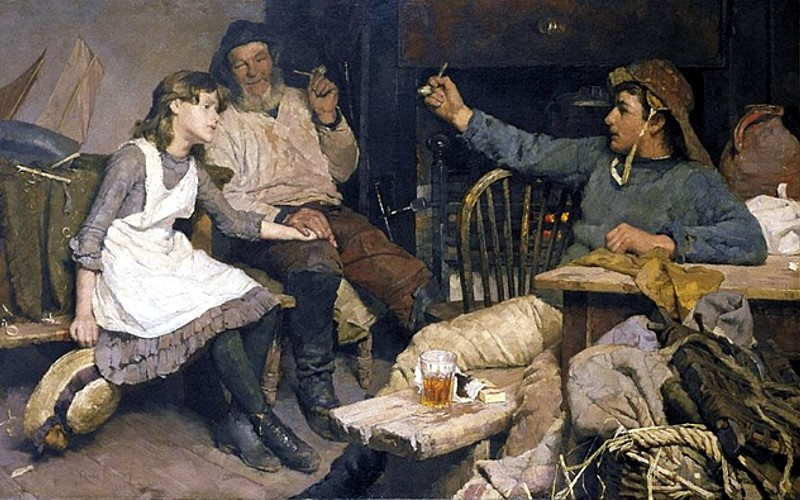
Everyone Has His Own Tale, 1885, oil on canvas

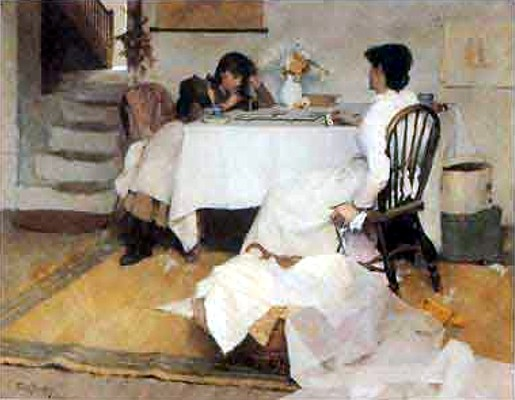
Domino!, 1886, oil on canvas

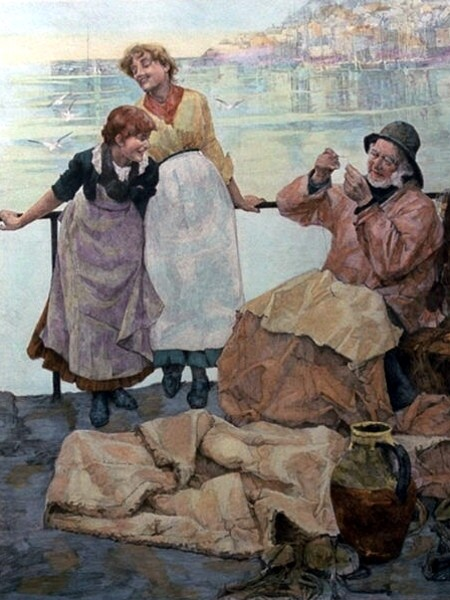
Eyes and No Eyes, 1887, etching

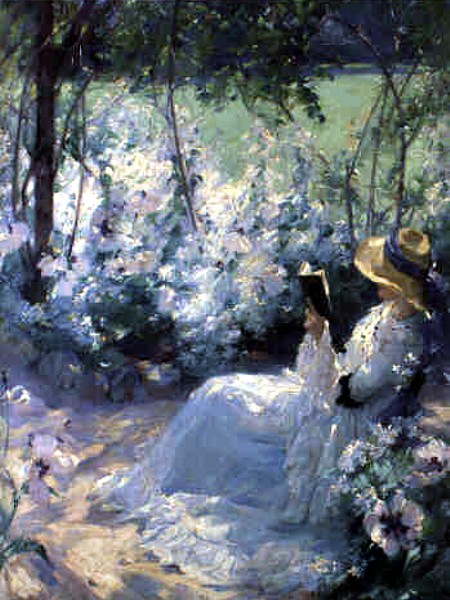
Delicious Solitude, 1909, oil on canvas

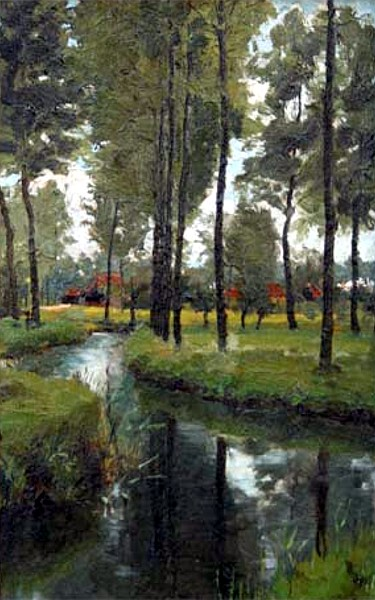
Borgerhout Anvers, oil on canvas

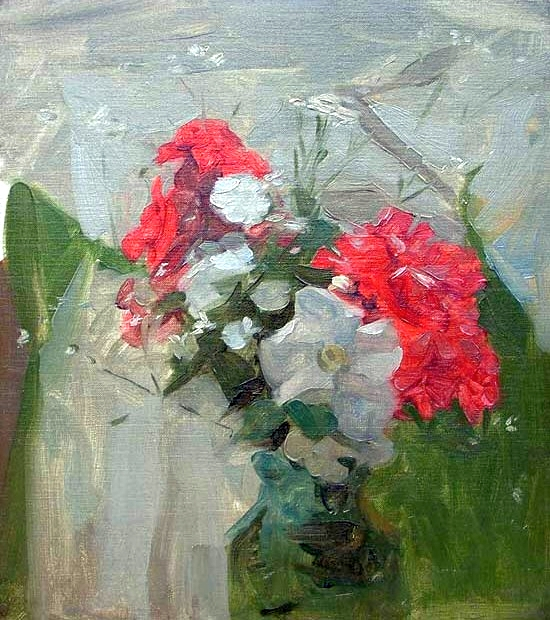
Flower Study, oil on canvas

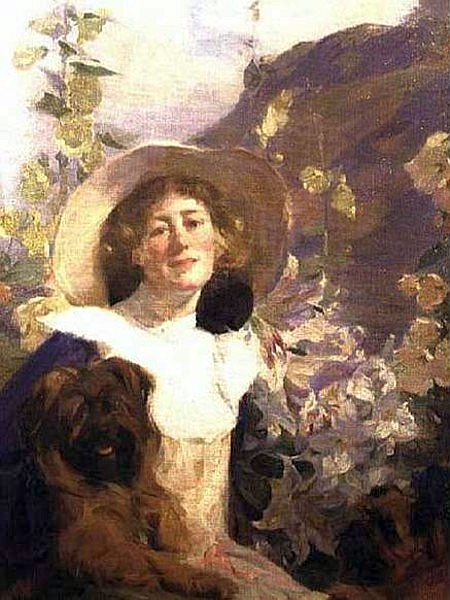
Friends - The Artist's Wife Katherine And Her Dog, oil on canvas

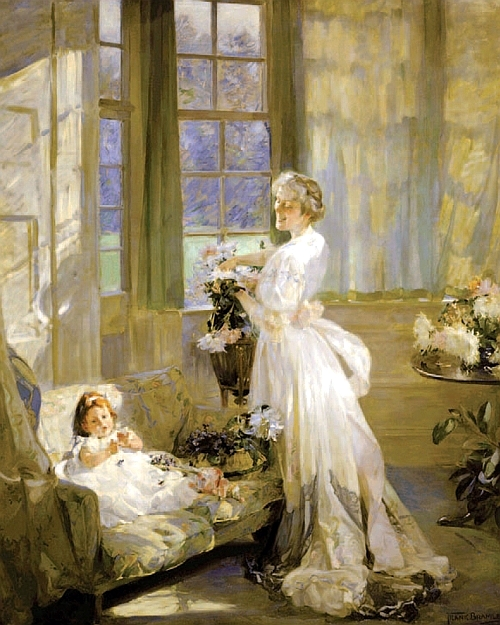
Helen Chalmers, 1908
