= William Breakspeare =

English painter (1856–1914)

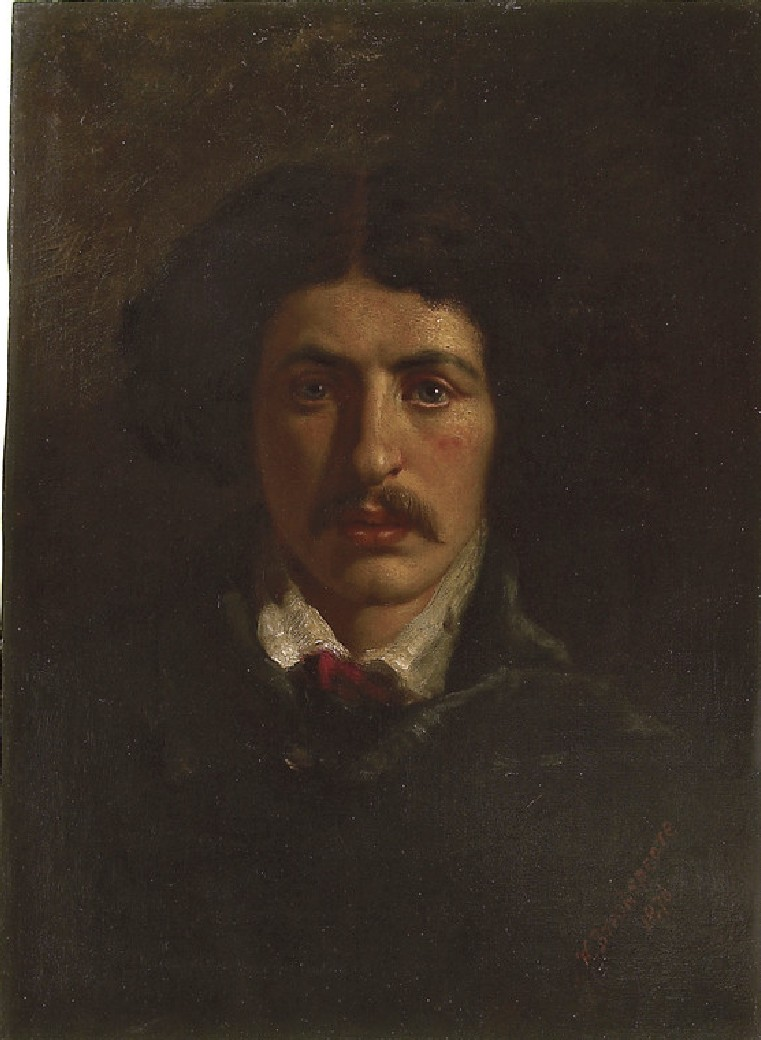
- self-portrait, now in the collection of the Ashmolean Museum
- Born: William Arthur Breakspear; 19 January 1856; Birmingham, Warwickshire, England
- Died: 8 May 1914 (aged 58); Haverstock Hill, London, England
- Education: Birmingham Government School of Design
- Occupation: Artist

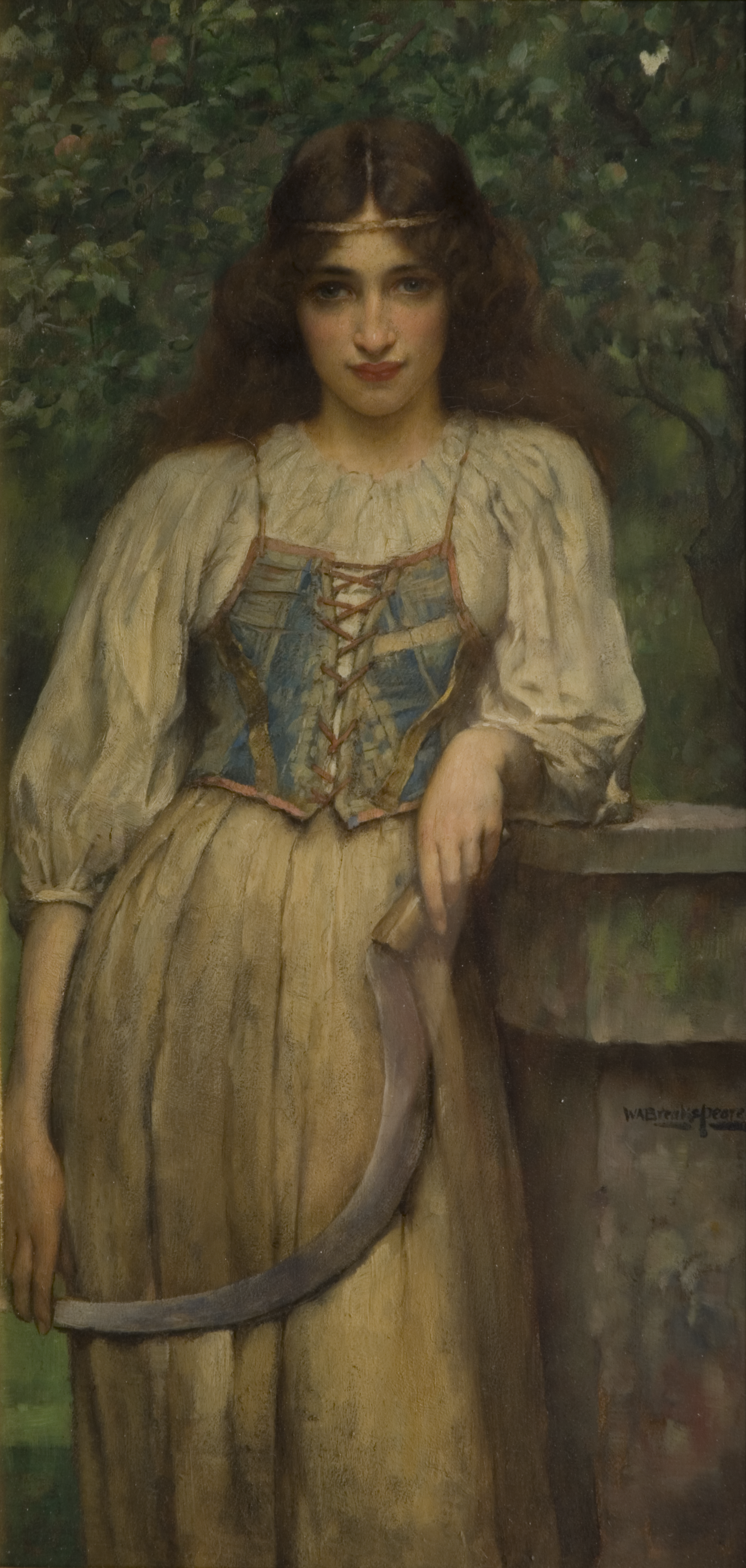
Resting, now in The New Art Gallery Walsall Permanent Collection

William Arthur Breakspeare (19 January 1856 – 8 May 1914) RBA, RBSA was an artist from Birmingham, England, the son of John Breakspeare, a flower painter working in the Birmingham japanning trade.

Breakspeare lived in Edgbaston, Birmingham until the age of 22. He was apprenticed to the japanners, Halbeard and Wellings, as a decorator. In 1877, he moved to Paradise Street in central Birmingham. He was closely associated with the Royal Birmingham Society of Artists (RBSA) gallery, exhibiting 34 works from 1874 to 1899. He was one of the first Associates of the RBSA in 1881 and was elected to the RBSA in 1884. He was also a founder member of the Birmingham Art Circle. In about 1884 he visited Newlyn in Cornwall where other ‘Birmingham Boys’ were helping to establish the colony of artists. His work covered many genres including genre, portrait, figure and 18th-century costume pieces and landscape.

Breakspeare spent time in Paris, moving there in 1879. Whilst living there he exhibited An Eastern Maid at the RBSA, perhaps showing an influence of Orientalism from his stay. However, his stay was short and he moved to Haverstock Hill in London a few years later in 1881. He is understood to have spent the rest of his life there. As well as his training in Paris, Breakspeare was initially trained at the Birmingham Government School of Design and Charles Verlat's Academy in Antwerp.

In his time Breakspeare exhibited around eight works at the Royal Academy in London from 1883 to 1893, including To Gretna Green and Bathers. He died at his home at the age of 58 in May 1914.

Although he has never been widely recognised for his art, in his time he was a significant member of not only the RBSA but also the Birmingham Art Circle.
