= Frederick George Pawsey =

Frederick George Pawsey (1870, Bury St Edmunds-25 December 1953) was an English photographer and publisher. He published many of his own photographs as well as some earlier ones by other photographers.

Frederick was one of seven children born to the family of to Thomas Pawsey, who worked as an ostler in Bury St Edmunds. Leaving school at about twelve, he was apprenticed to a local printer. He supplemented his wages selling newspapers in Bury town centre. He founded his own business in 1885, taking on C. Langhorn as a partner, the company becoming Pawsey and Langhorn Co. in 1890. Although C. Langhorn died in 1900, the name was retained until 1907, when the business became a Limited Company known as F.G. Pawsey & Co. From 1898 the company had premises in Hatter Street. These had previously belonged to the printers, William Barker & Sons.

== Suffolk Illustrated ==
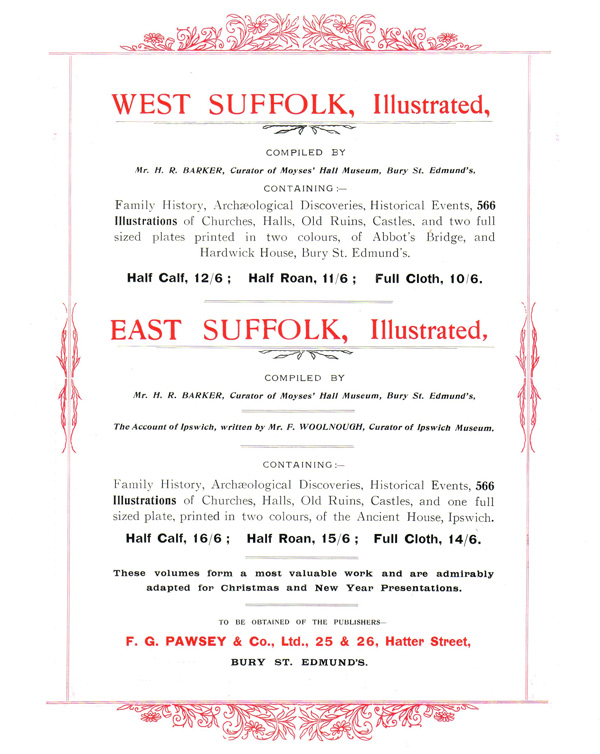
Advert for West Suffolk Illustrated and East Suffolk Illustrated, 1909

Horace Ross Barker, grandson of William, became curator of Moyse's Hall Museum on retirement. He also compiled the two volumes West Suffolk Illustrated and East Suffolk Illustrated, illustrated with photographs by George S. Cousins and published by F. G. Pawsey and Co.
