= Gallery Oldham =

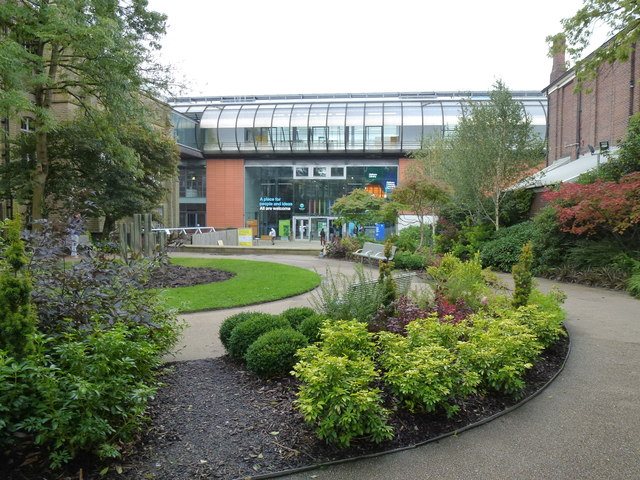
- Gallery Oldham

- Location within Greater Manchester
- Established: 2002
- Location: Oldham, Greater Manchester, England
- Coordinates: 53.540278°N 2.109167°W
- Type: Art gallery
- Website: galleryoldham.org.uk

Gallery Oldham is a free-to-view public museum and art gallery in the Cultural Quarter of central Oldham, in Greater Manchester, England.

== Design ==
Designed by architects Pringle Richards Sharratt, Gallery Oldham was completed in its original form in February 2002. The art gallery integrates local museum and gallery services. An extension to include the £13 million Oldham Library and Lifelong Learning Centre opened in April 2006. The building has library and learning facilities.

== Programming ==
Programming incorporates Oldham's art, social and natural history collections alongside touring work, newly commissioned and contemporary art, international art and work produced with local communities.

The gallery holds the civic collection of Oldham and much of that of the wider Metropolitan Borough of Oldham.

== Exhibits ==
It has a permanent display called Oldham Stories, exhibiting objects and specimens from across the collections and two temporary exhibition galleries. Gallery Oldham has one of the busiest exhibitions programmes in the region. Exhibitions mix touring shows with work from the gallery's own collection of art, social history and natural history. The gallery holds work by local artists including Helen Bradley, William Stott and Alan Rankle and its collections include work by British artists L. S. Lowry, John William Waterhouse and Bridget Riley. In recent years the gallery has built up a collection of studio pottery and displays ceramic works by modern makers.

== Gallery ==
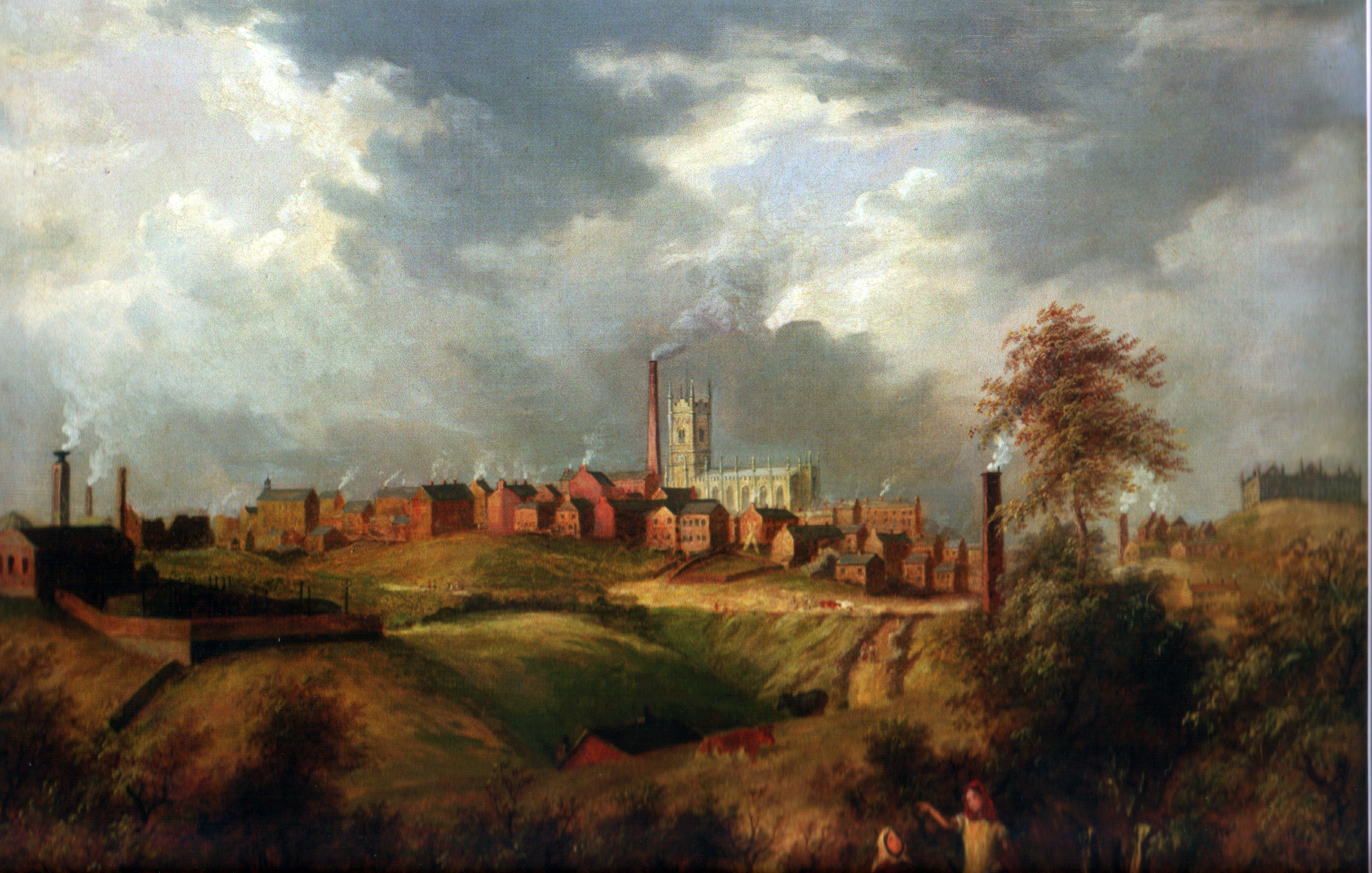
Oldham from Glodwick by James Howe Carse, 1831

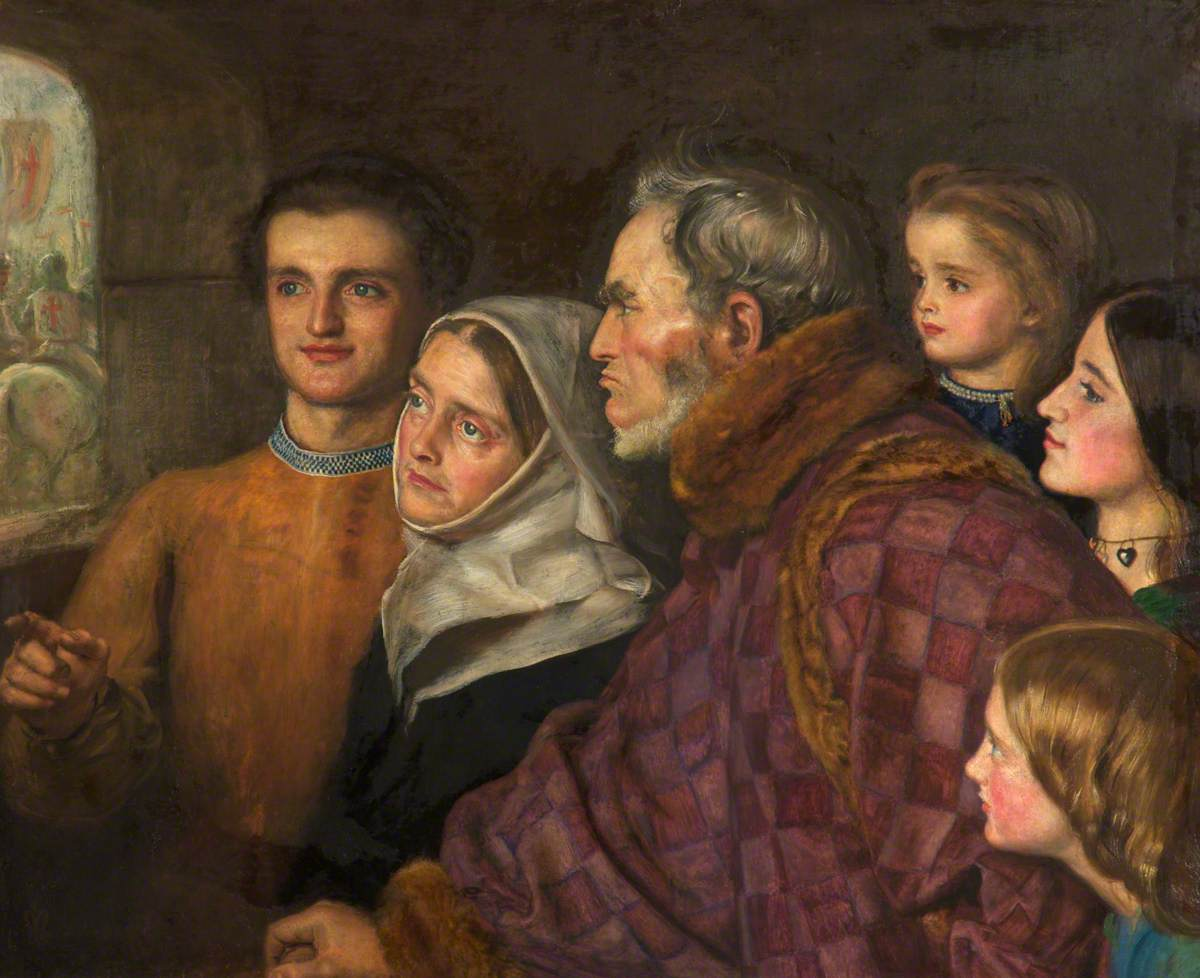
The Departure of the Crusaders by John Everett Millais, 1858

The Mackerel Take by James Clarke Hook, 1865

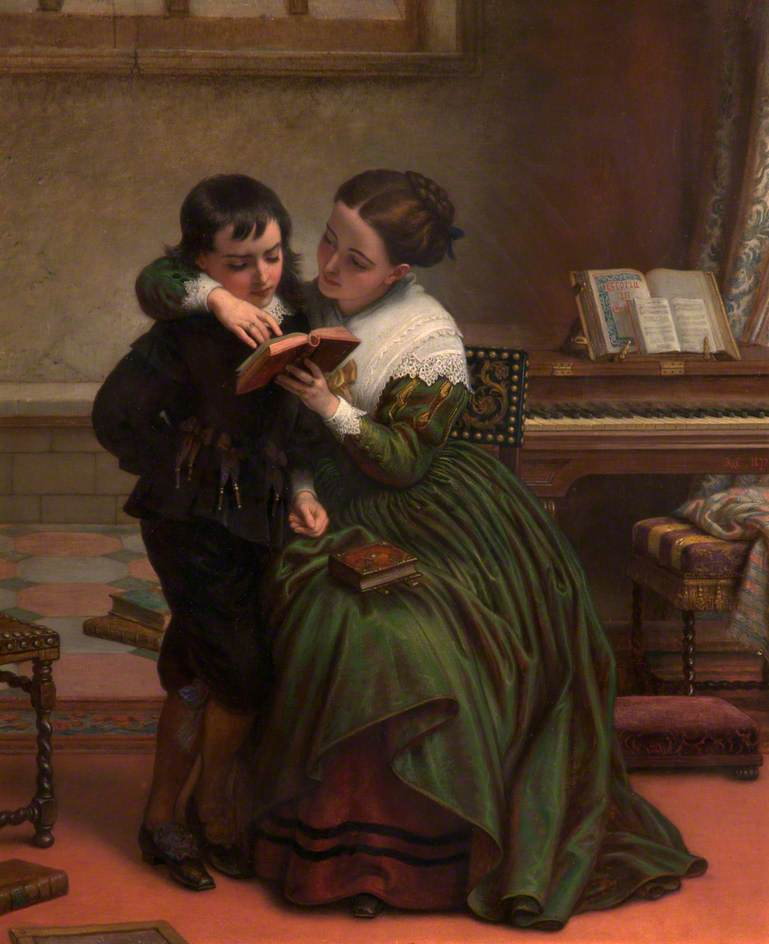
George Herbert and His Mother by Charles West Cope, 1872

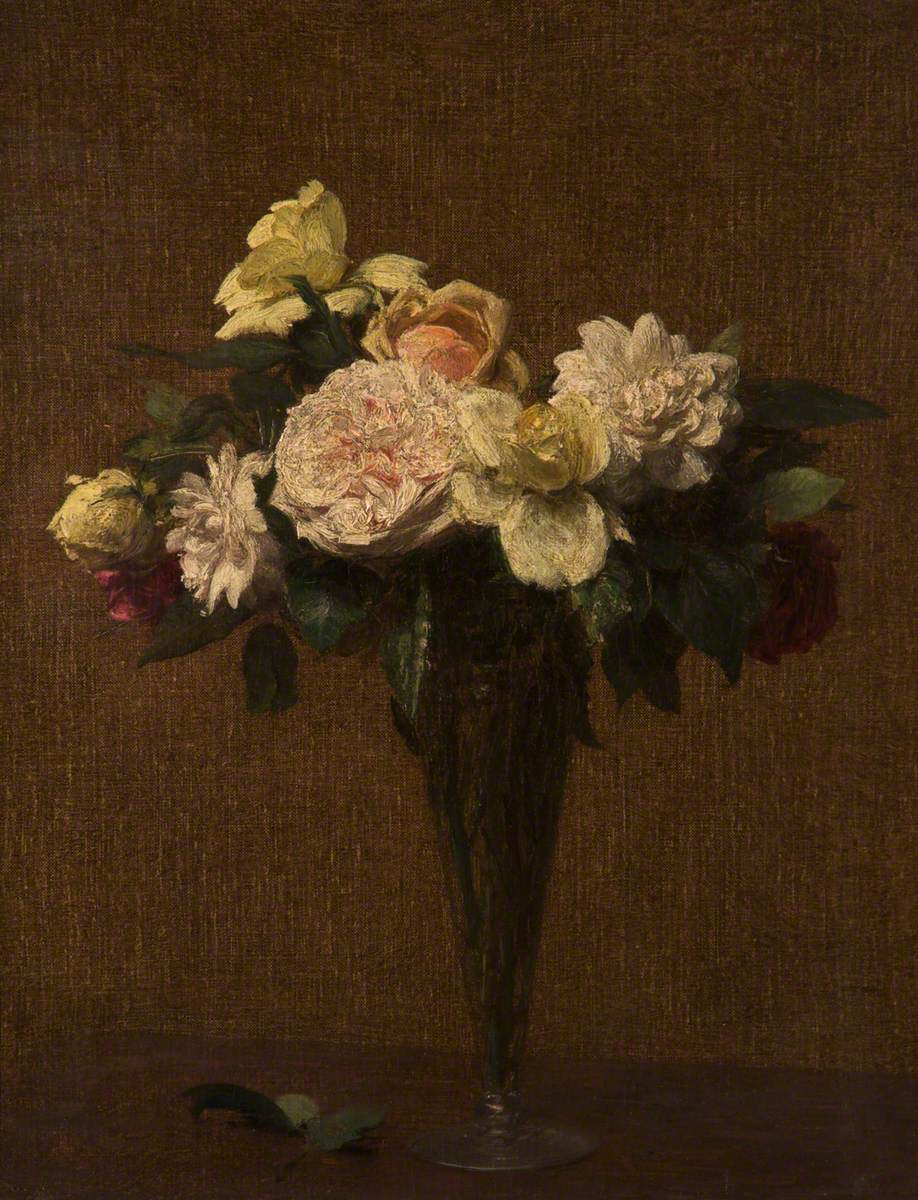
Roses by Henri Fantin-Latour, 1879

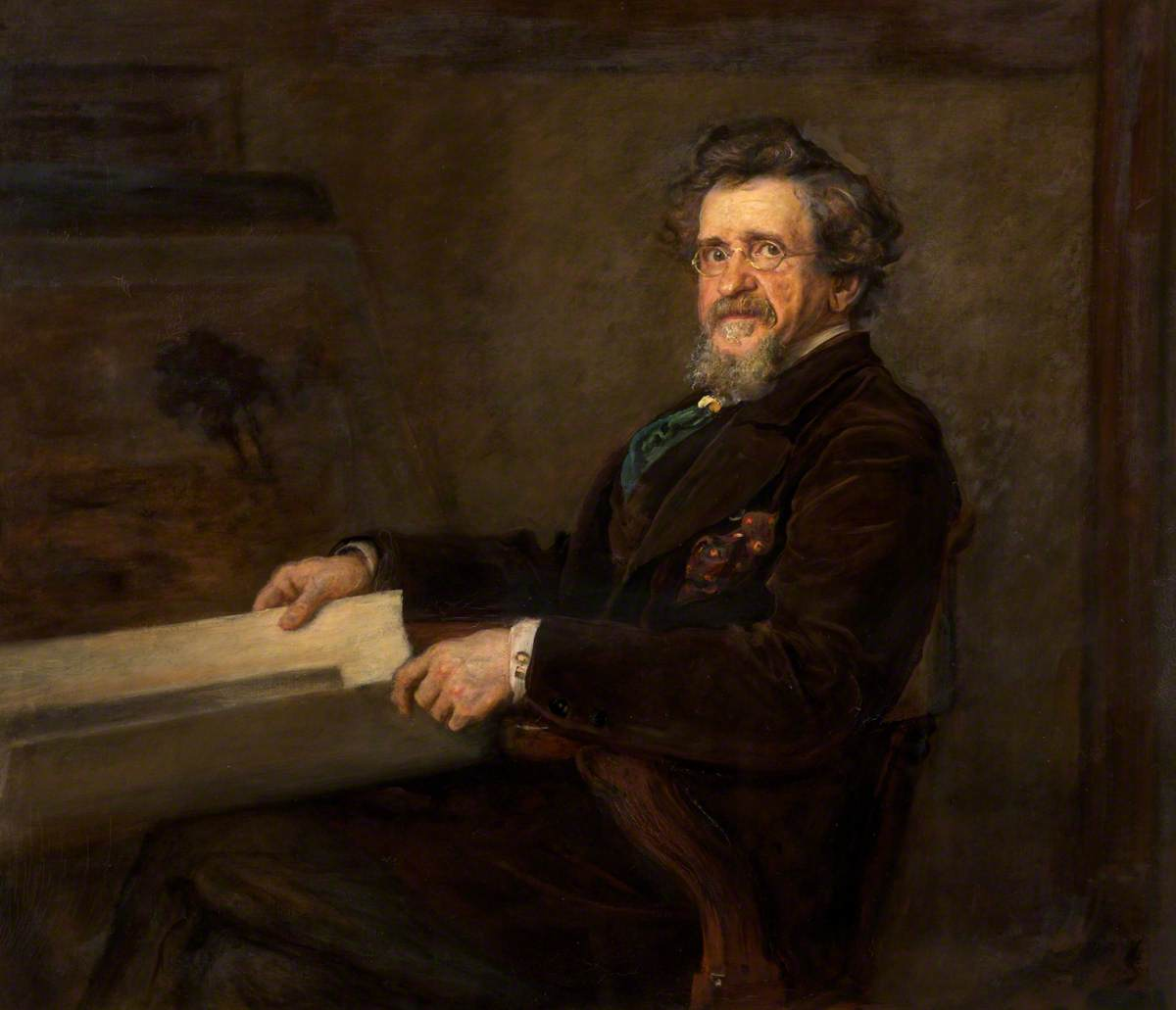
Portrait of Thomas Oldham Barlow by John Everett Millais, 1886

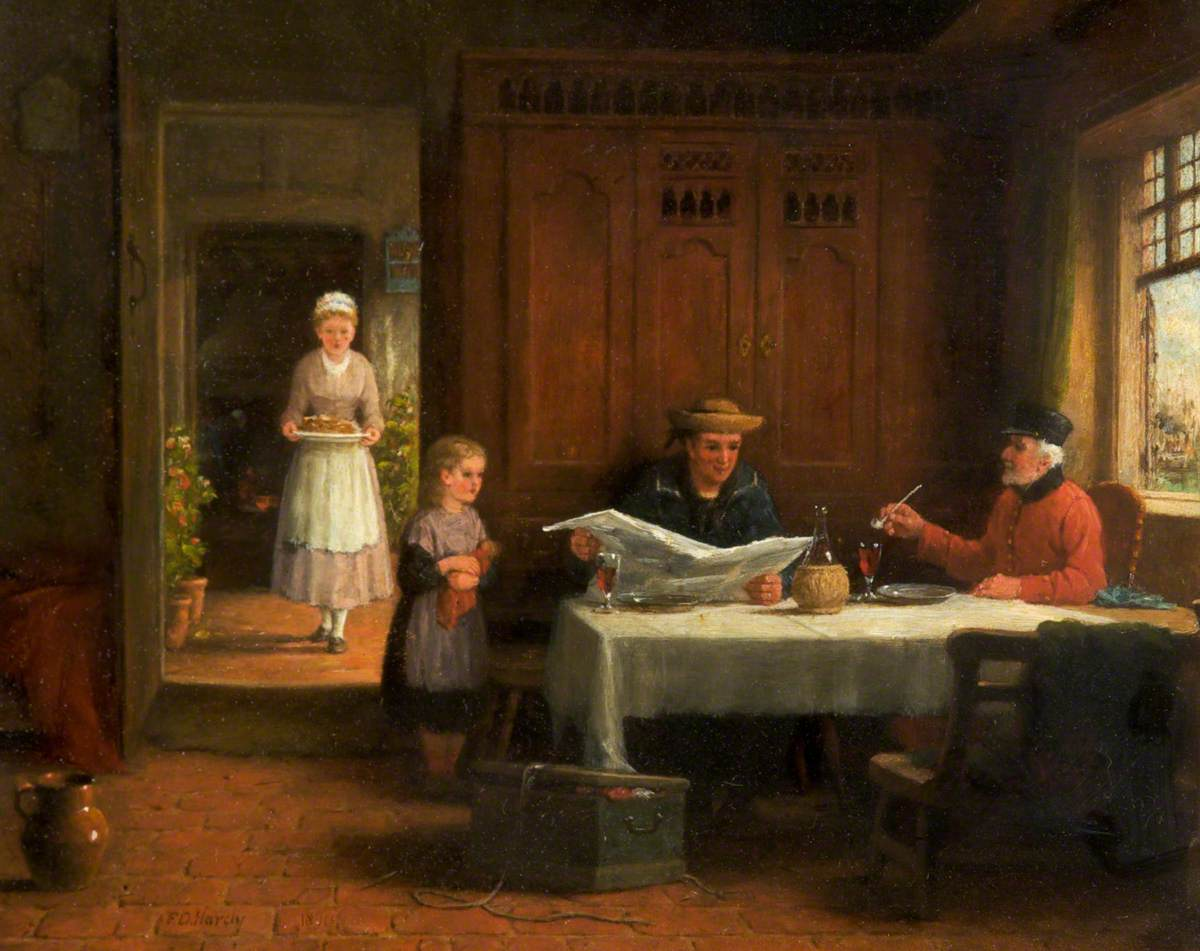
Paid Off by Frederick Daniel Hardy, 1890

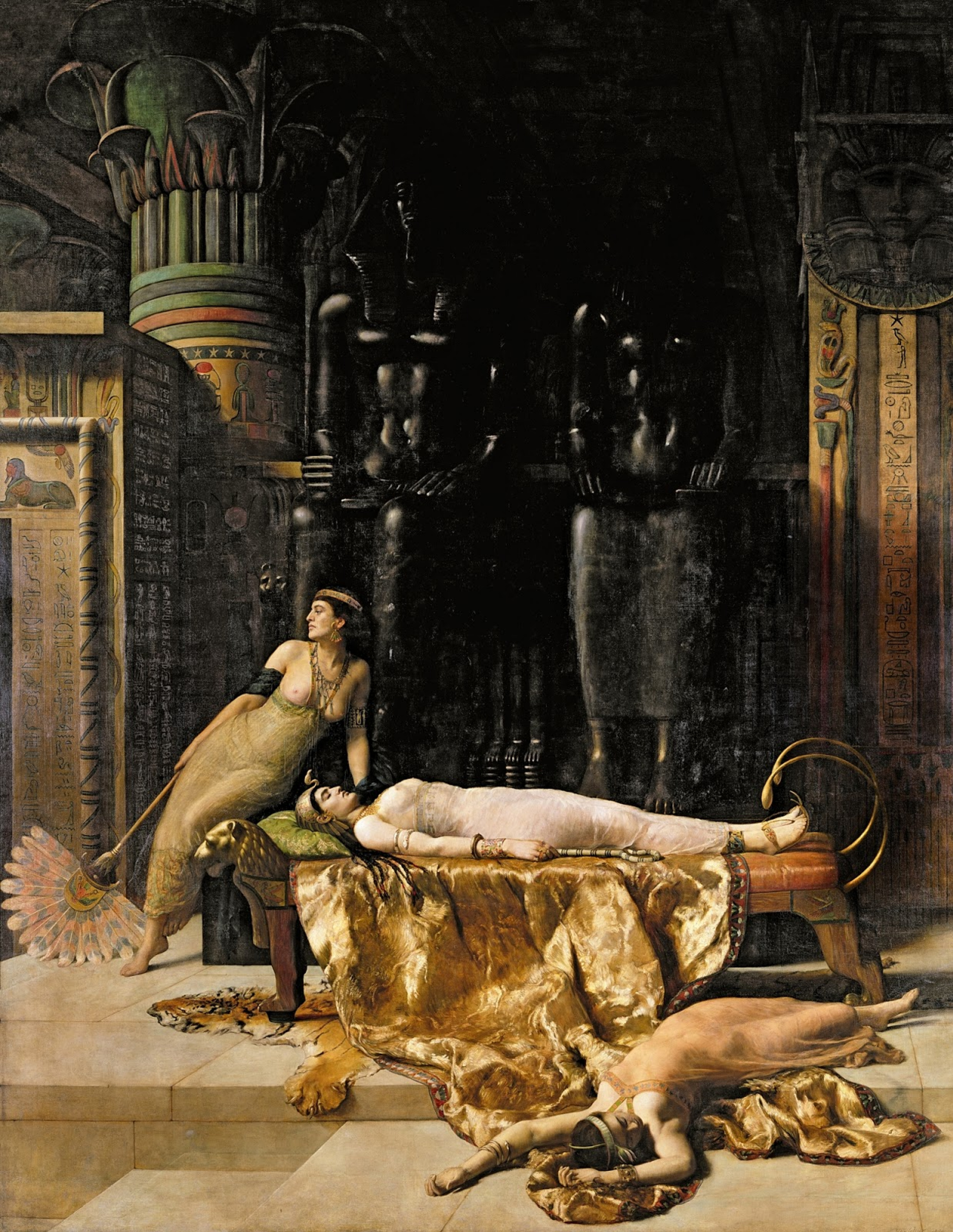
The Death of Cleopatra by John Collier, 1890

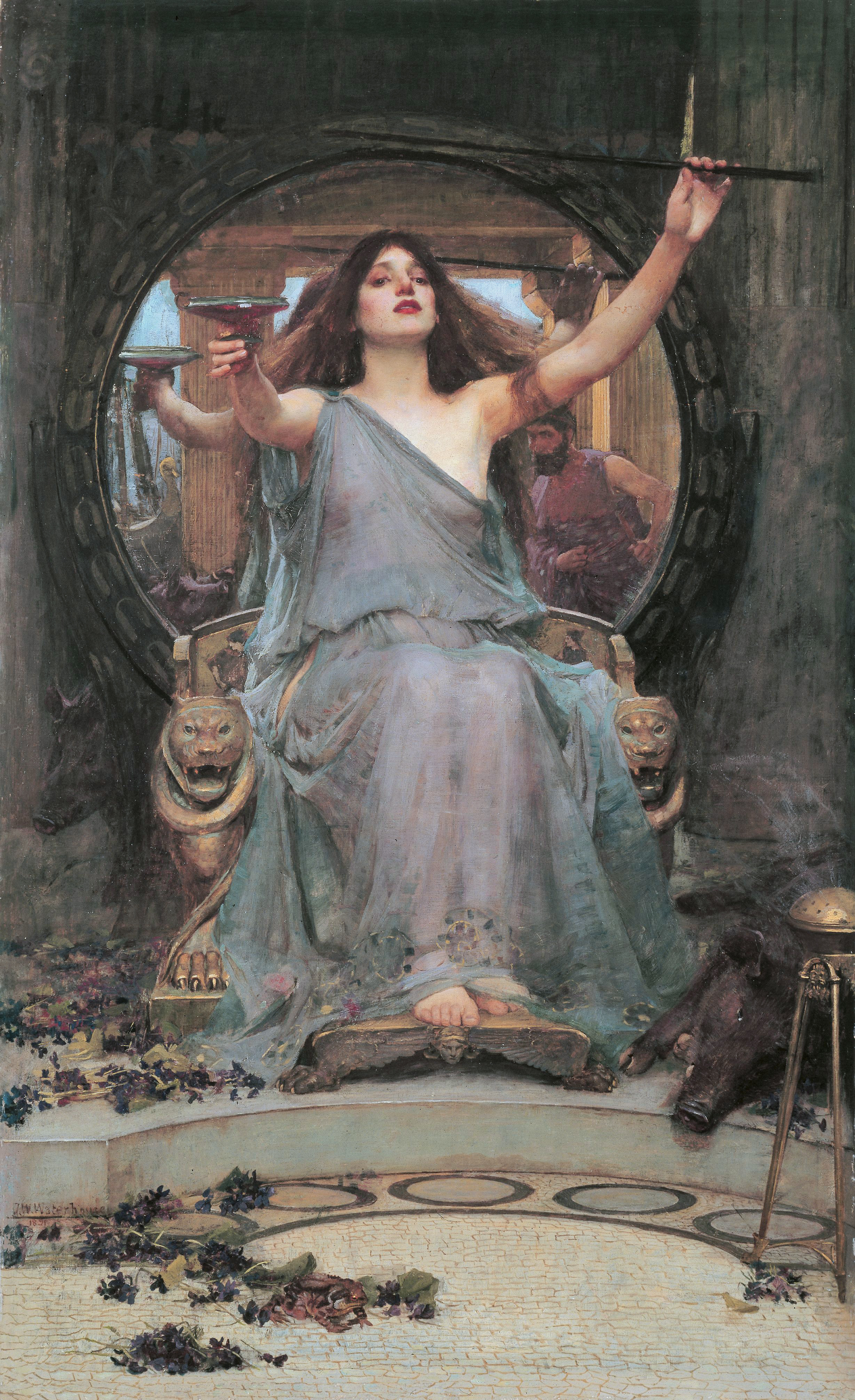
Circe Offering the Cup to Ulysses by John Collier, 1891

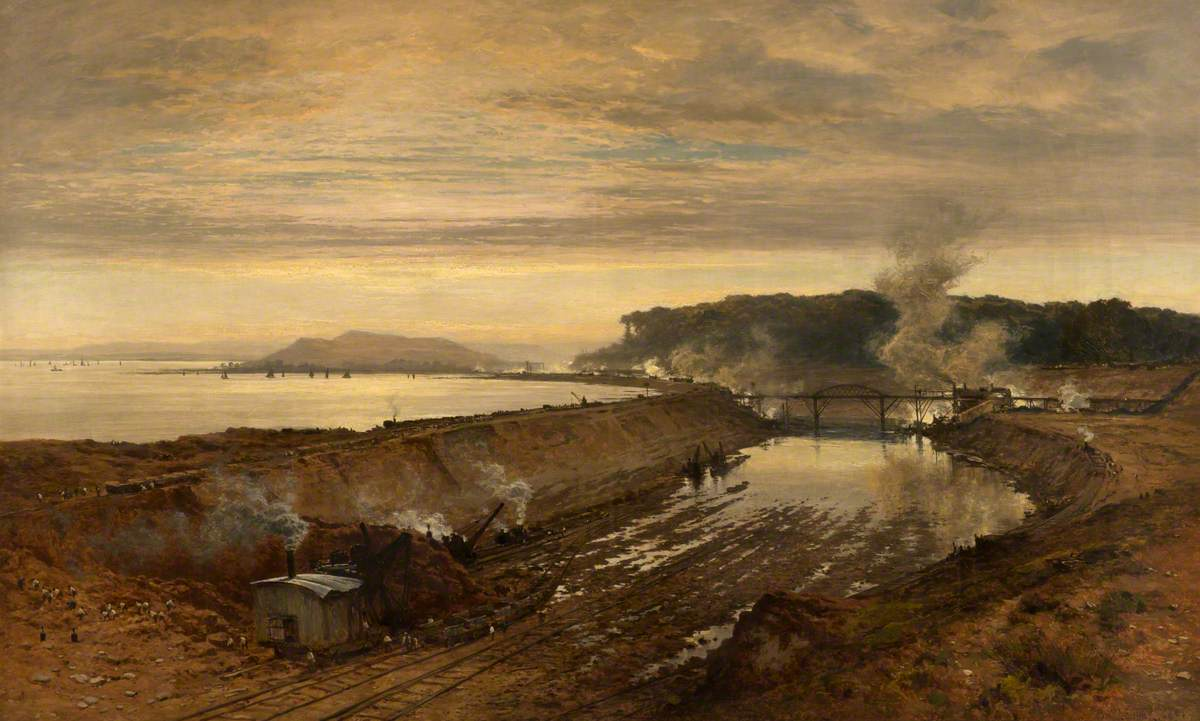
Manchester Ship Canal, Eastham Dock by Benjamin Williams Leader, 1891

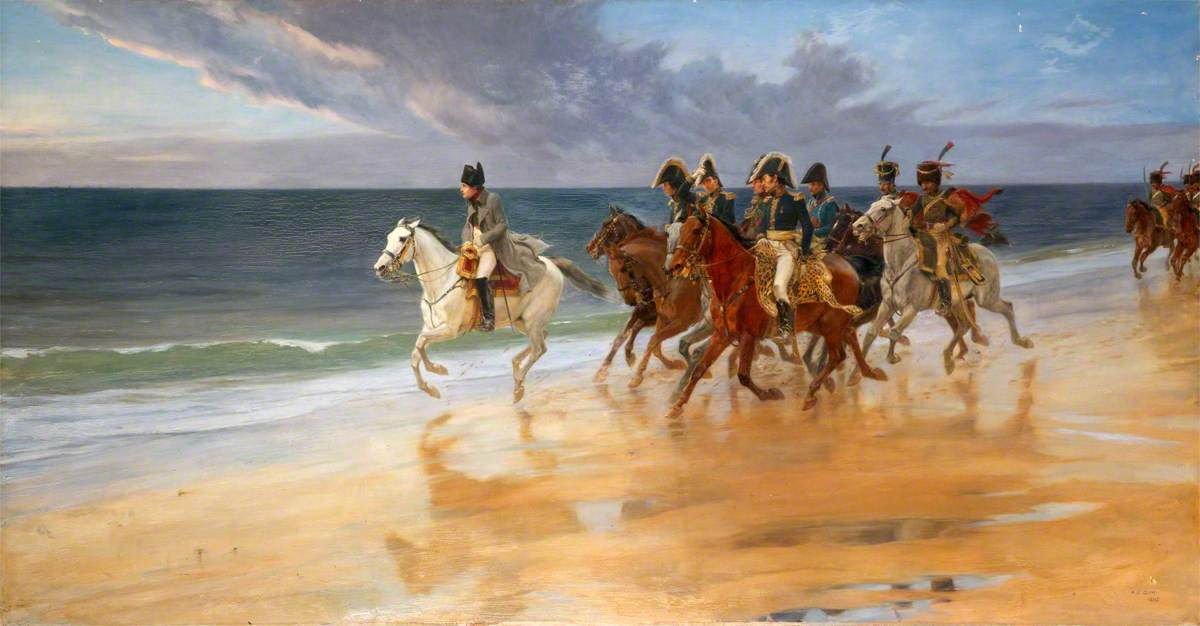
Napoleon on the Sands at Boulogne by Andrew Carrick Gow, 1895

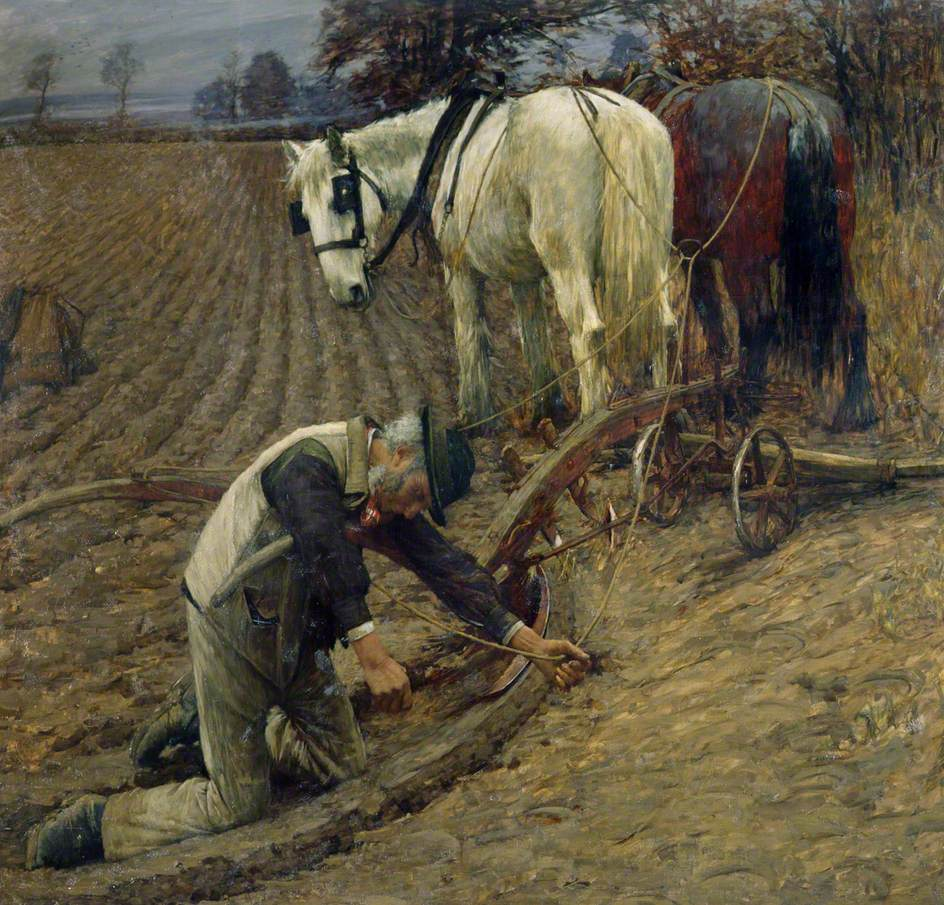
The Last Furrow by Henry Herbert La Thangue, 1895

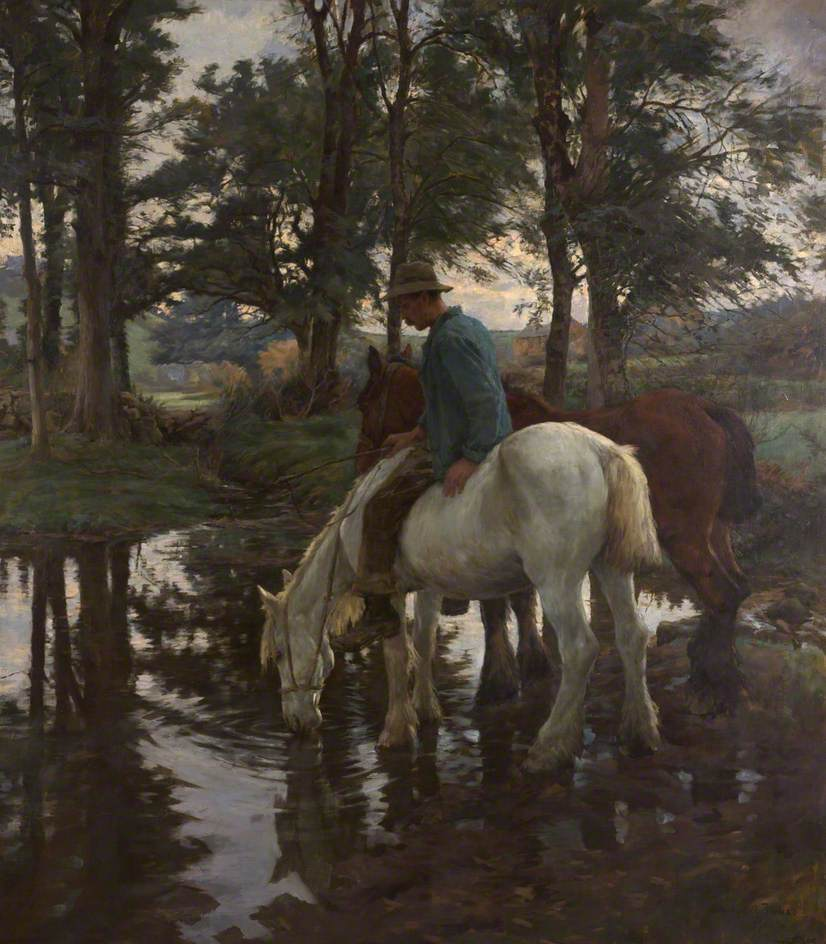
The Drinking Place by Stanhope Forbes, 1900

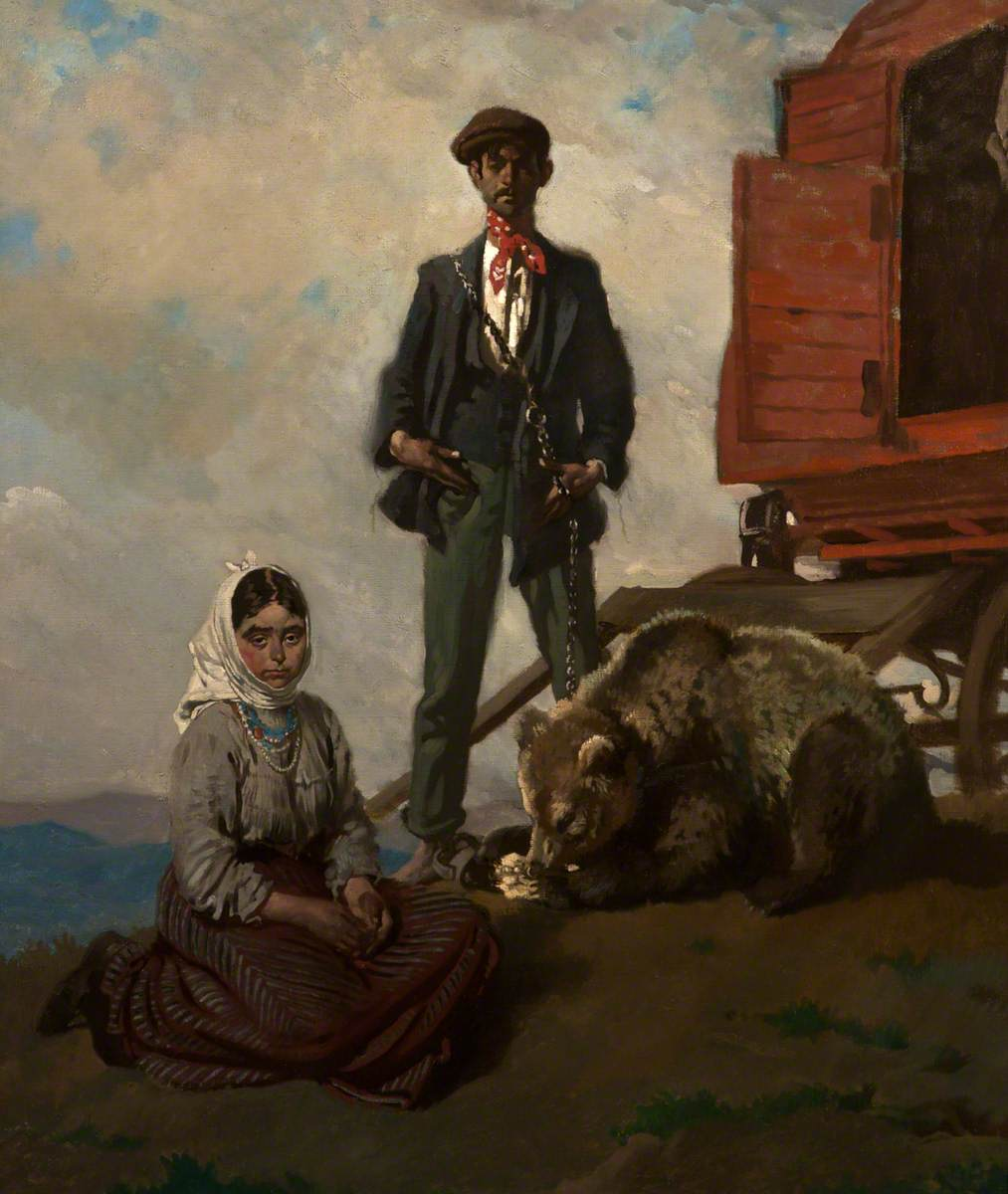
In the Dublin Mountains by William Orpen, 1909

My Kitchen by Harold Harvey, 1923
