= The Death of Cleopatra (Collier) =

Painting by John Collier

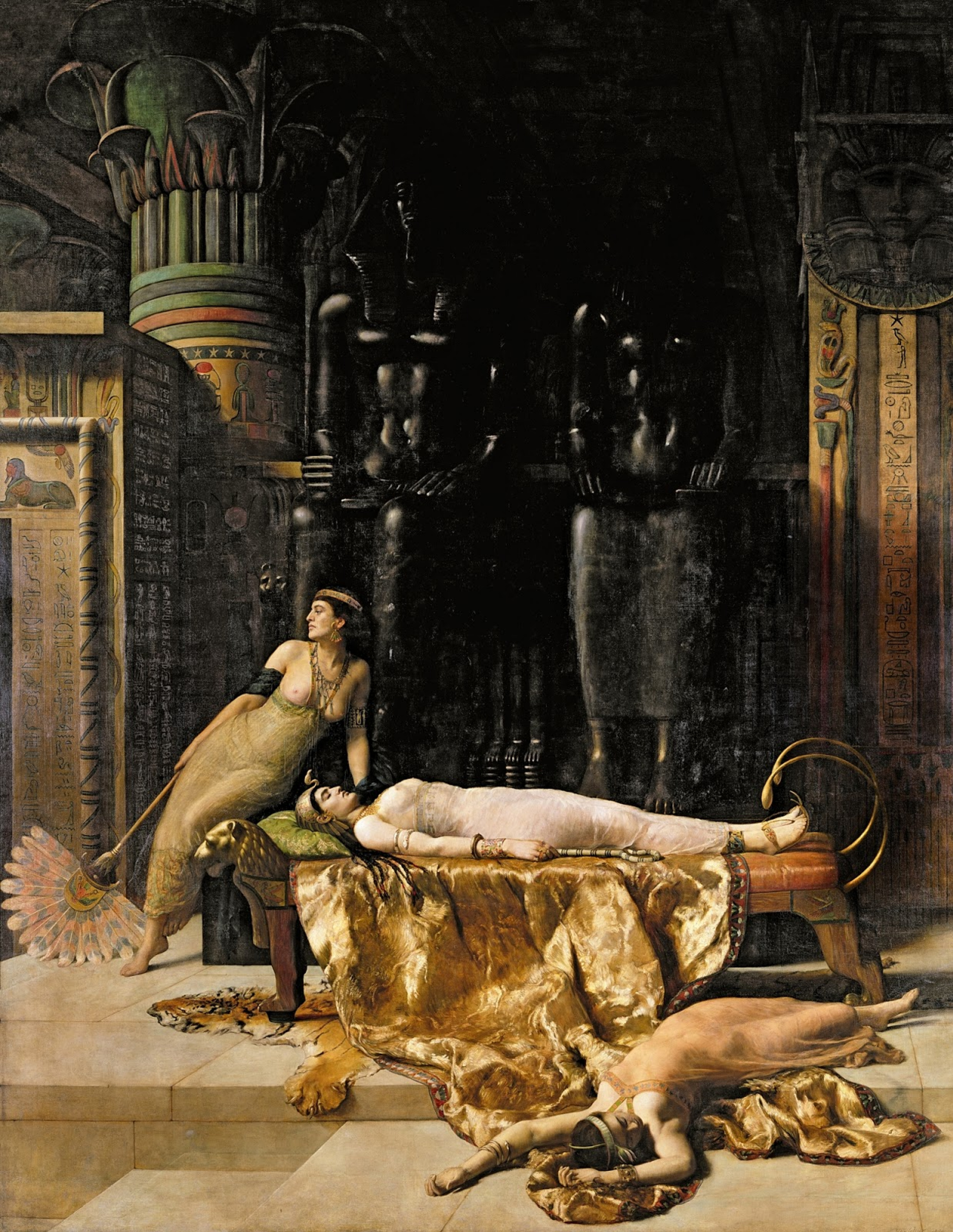
- Artist: John Collier
- Year: 1890
- Type: Oil on canvas, history painting
- Dimensions: 395 cm × 315 cm (156 in × 124 in)
- Location: Gallery Oldham, Greater Manchester

The Death of Cleopatra is an oil on canvas history painting by the British artist John Collier, from 1890.

== History and description ==
The picture depicts the scene after the Ancient Egyptian queen Cleopatra committed suicide following the defeat of her lover Mark Antony at the Battle of Actium to the forces of the first Roman Emperor Augustus. She lies on a divan attended by two of her handmaidens. The large canvas is painted in the Academic style of the late Victorian era

The painting was displayed at the Royal Academy Exhibition of 1890 held at Burlington House in London's Piccadilly. It was acquired the same year by the corporation of Oldham and now hangs in the town's Gallery Oldham.

== Bibliography ==
- Barrow, Rosemary J. The Use of Classical Art and Literature by Victorian Painters, 1860-1912. Edwin Mellen Press, 2007.
- Pollock, Walter Herries. The Art of John Collier. Virtue & Company, 1914.
