= Geoffrey Sneyd Garnier =

English artist and printmaker (1889–1970)

Geoffrey Sneyd Garnier (1889–1970) was an English artist and printmaker. He was born in Wigan, the son of Russell Montague Garnier, a writer. He was educated at Charterhouse School, and studied engineering in London.

Garnier worked as an engineer in Toronto, Canada. In 1910 he came back to England to study at the Bushey School of Painting in Hertfordshire. In 1913 Garnier moved to Newlyn, where he studied under Stanhope Forbes. After a brief stint in the British army, from which he was discharged on medical grounds, he married his cousin Jill Blyth, a fellow artist at Forbes' school, in 1917. They lived at Orchard Cottage, Newlyn.

Garnier had a studio at Trewarveneth, shared with the artist Richard Copeland Weatherby. His greatest skill was in etching and engraving, in which subjects he gave lessons to such Newlyn school painters as Lamorna Birch. He studied the work of William Daniell, using his copper plate techniques to produce aquatints. He was a member of the St Ives Society of Artists, which was founded in 1927. The artists Park, Smart, Leach and Birch from their colony were provided with studios and permanent exhibition space, and instituted lectures.
