= The Harbour Window =

Painting by Stanhope Forbes

- Artist: Stanhope Forbes
- Year: 1910
- Type: Oil on canvas, genre painting
- Dimensions: 112.5 cm × 86.7 cm (44.3 in × 34.1 in)
- Location: Royal Academy, London

The Harbour Window is a 1910 oil painting by the Irish artist Stanhope Forbes. It depicts the view from the window of an upstairs room of the Ship Inn in the Cornish port of Mousehole. Forbes was a founder of the Newlyn School of artists established in the Victorian era, who produced many works of life on the Cornish coast. In 1910 when he was elected to membership of the Royal Academy of Arts Forbes was required to present a diploma work and submitted this. It was displayed at the Royal Academy Exhibition of 1911 at Burlington House, a major year of critical success for the artist.

== Bibliography ==
- Borzello, Frances. At Home: The Domestic Interior in Art. Thames & Hudson, 2006.
- Gray, Anne & Galbally, Ann. The Edwardians: Secrets and Desires. National Gallery of Australia, 2004.
