= Stanhope Forbes =

Irish painter (1857–1947)

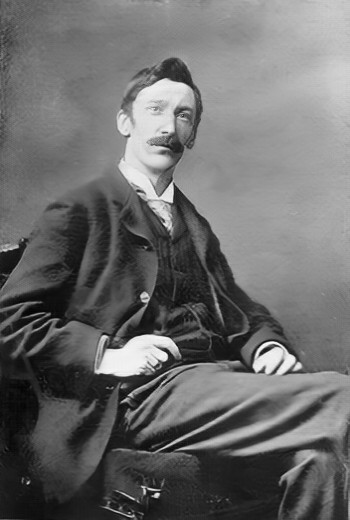
- Photograph, c. 1890
- Born: 18 November 1857; Dublin, County Dublin, Ireland
- Died: 2 March 1947 (aged 89); Newlyn, Cornwall, England
- Education: Lambeth School of Art, Royal Academy, and in Paris under Léon Bonnat
- Known for: Painter
- Movement: Newlyn School
- Spouse: Elizabeth Forbes
- Awards: RA

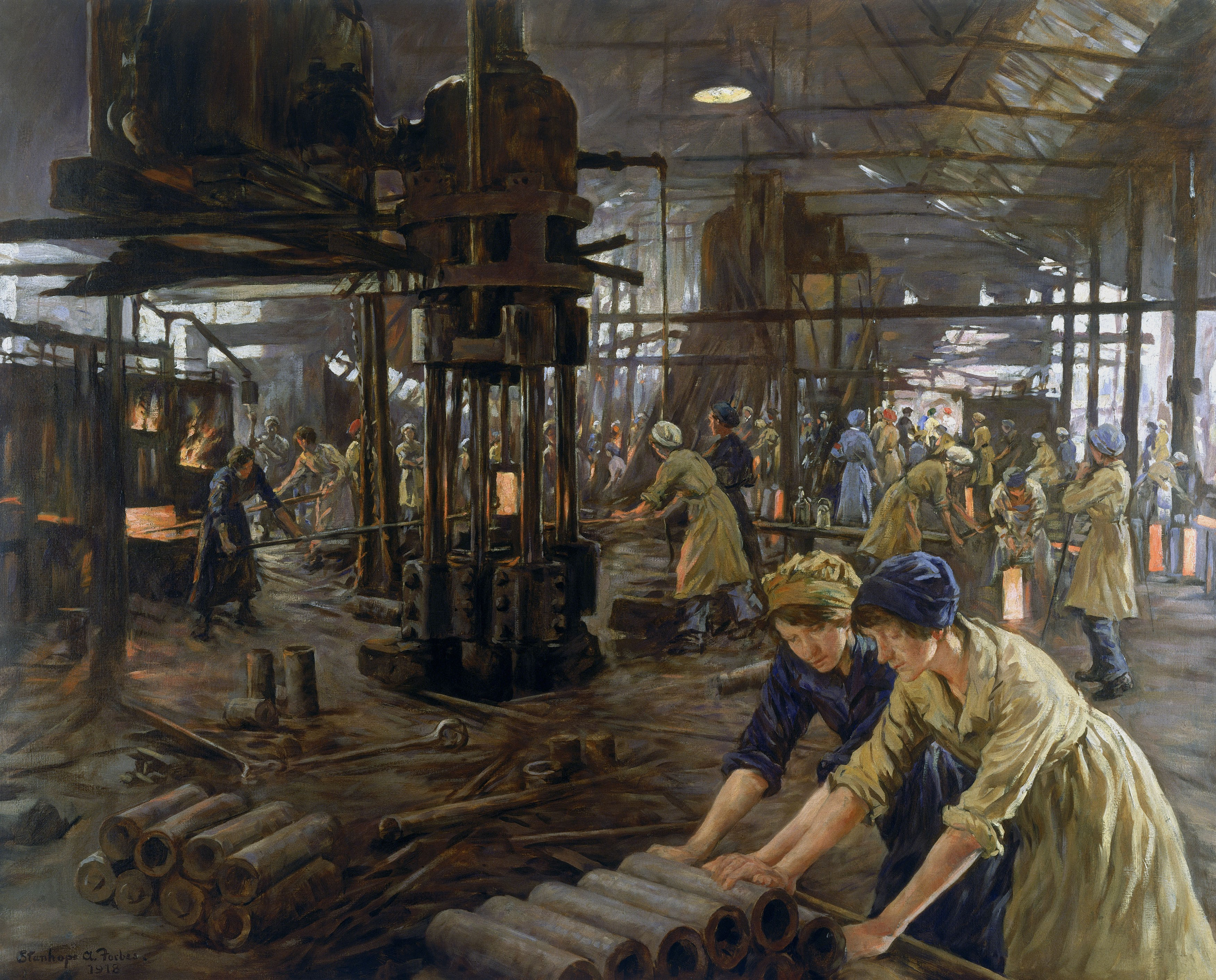
The Munitions Girls, 1918

Stanhope Alexander Forbes RA (18 November 1857 – 2 March 1947) was a British artist, born in Ireland, and a founding member of the influential Newlyn school of painters. He was often called 'the father of the Newlyn School'.

== Personal life ==
Forbes was born in Dublin, the son of Juliette de Guise Forbes, a French woman, and William Forbes, an English railway manager, who was later transferred to London. He had an older brother, Sir William Forbes, who was a railway manager for the London, Brighton, and South Coast Railway.

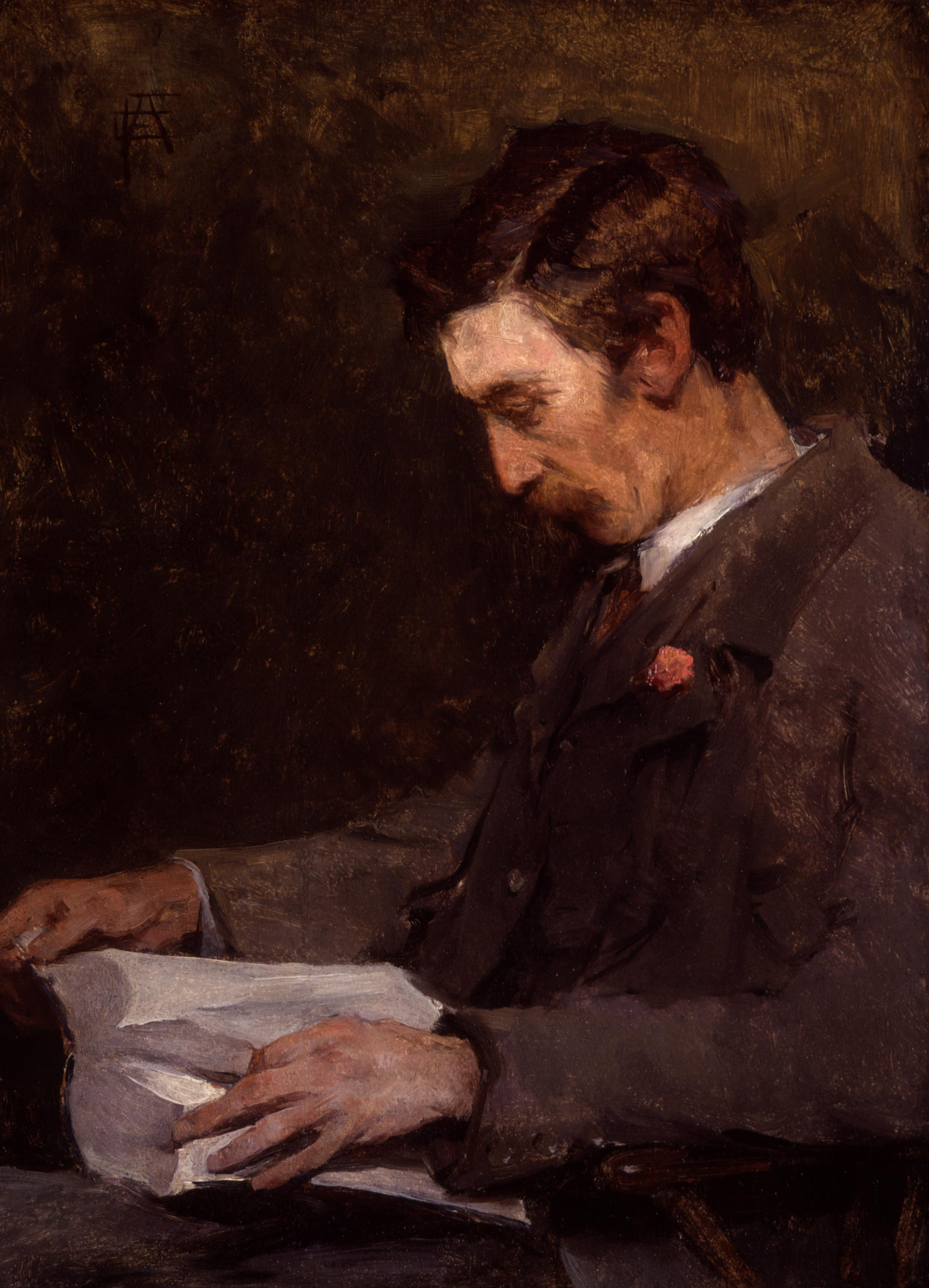
Portrait of Forbes by his wife, Elizabeth Adèla Forbes (née Armstrong)

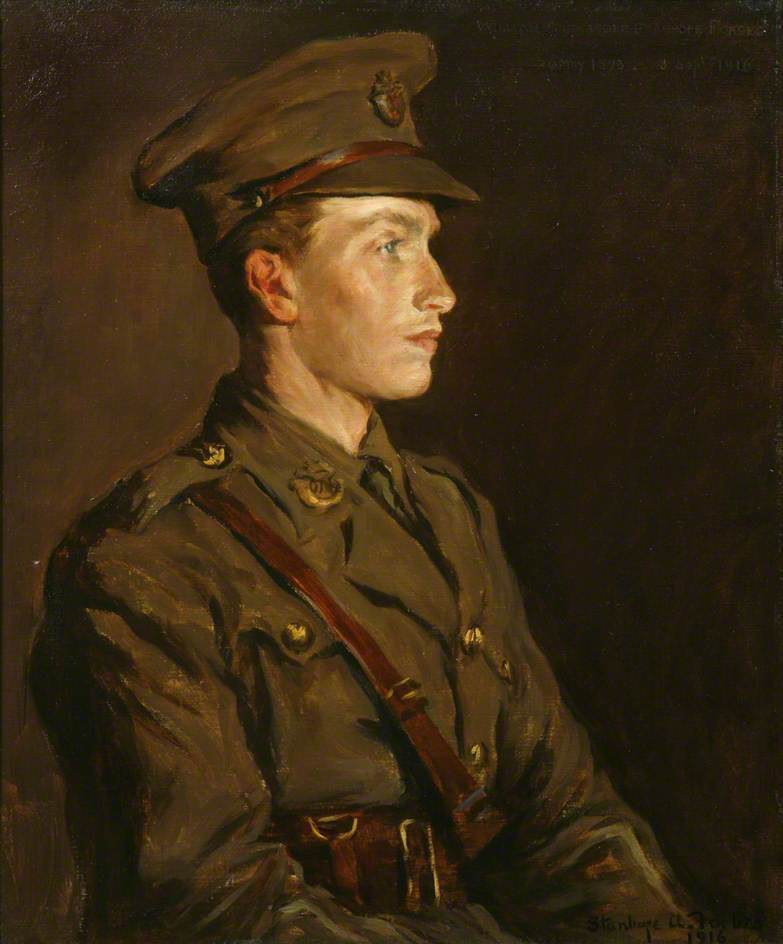
Forbes' portrait of his son Alec, who died in the First World War

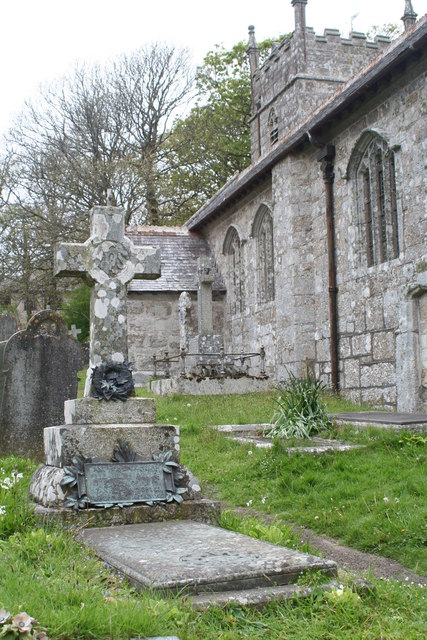
Grave of Forbes and his wife in Sancreed churchyard

In the summer of 1889, he married fellow painter Elizabeth Armstrong at Newlyn's St Peter's Church. Their first home was at the "Cliffs Castle" cottage, which overlooked the sea. They had a son named Alexander (usually known as Alec), born 26 May 1893. The couple had a home built for the family in Higher Faughan, Penzance. Elizabeth died in 1912.

In 1915, Forbes married his friend and previous student Maudie Palmer, who had been "assistant, helper and friend to the whole Forbes family." During the First World War his son Alec served in the Duke of Cornwall's Light Infantry and was killed on 3 September 1916. He is buried in Guillemont Road Cemetery where his headstone bears an inscription composed by his father: HE SAW BEYOND THE FILTH OF BATTLE, AND THOUGHT DEATH A FAIR PRICE TO PAY TO BELONG TO THE COMPANY OF THESE FELLOWS. Stanhope Forbes also sculpted and erected a memorial to his son in their local parish church with the inscription: "I will get me out of my COUNTRY & from my KINDRED & from my FATHER'S house unto a LAND that GOD will shew me".

Forbes died in Newlyn on 2 March 1947 at the age of 89. He was buried in the churchyard of Sancreed Parish Church.

== Education ==
Educated at Dulwich College, he studied art under John Sparkes who later taught at South Kensington School of Art. His father then worked for the Luxembourg Railway and after a period of poor health Forbes was removed from Dulwich College and studied under private teachers in Brussels. This afforded additional time to draw. After the end of the Franco-Prussian War, the Forbes family returned to London. John Sparkes helped influence William Forbes to recognise his son's artistic talent, Stanhope Forbes then attended Lambeth School of Art (now the City & Guilds of London Art School). By 1878 he attended the Royal Academy Schools under Sir Frederic Leighton and Sir John Millais. Fellow students at the academy included Arthur Hacker, Henry Herbert La Thangue and Solomon J. Solomon. He participated in his first exhibition there.

Forbes returned to Ireland for a few months to visit Dr Andrew Melville, family friend and Queen's College professor. While there the men shared their appreciation of art and Forbes painted landscapes of the Galway area. He also received his first commission for a portrait. Back in London, at the age of 18, he received another commission for a portrait of a doctor's daughter, Florence. It was exhibited at the Royal Academy in 1879.

He then studied at the private atelier of Léon Bonnat in Clichy, Paris from 1880 to 1882. Henry Herbert La Thangue, who also attended Dulwich College, Lambeth School of Art and the Royal Academy, came to Paris, too, and studied at the École nationale supérieure des Beaux-Arts. Arthur Hacker, a friend from the Royal Academy joined Forbes at Bonnat's atelier. In 1881 (Note: Mrs. Lionel Birch states that Forbes and La Thangue went to Cancale, Brittany in 1880.) Forbes and La Thangue went to Cancale, Brittany and painted en plein air, like Jules Bastien-Lepage, which became a technique that Forbes used throughout his career.

Of Brittany, Mrs Lionel Birch wrote:

In that most beautiful and interesting portion of France, there seemed to be found everything that an artist could desire. Inhabited by a race of a distinct and marked type, wearing still the beautiful national costumes which had been handed down from bygone ages, and retaining the old language of their forefathers, each village followed religiously the old traditions which ordered the fashion of their dress and the conduct of their lives. Here was a country dear to all who love that which is old and quaint, time-honoured, and reminiscent of past ages.

A painting made there, A Street in Brittany, was shown and well received at the 1882 Royal Academy Summer Exhibition and sold later that year to the Walker Art Gallery in Liverpool. During an 1883 (Note: Mrs. Lionel Birch states that Forbes and La Thangue went to Quimperlé, Brittany in 1881 and 1882.) trip to Brittany, Forbes stayed at Quimperlé. His Breton Children in an Orchard - Quimperlé, was shown at the 1884 Royal Hibernian Academy. Two other works were made Fair Measures: a shop in Quimperlé and Preparations for the Market, Quimperlé; They were both shown at the Royal Academy in 1884. True to his degree of satisfaction, the Fair Measures painting was well-received and the Market painting was found to be too blue and shadowless. Since blue was the colour of the Breton costumes, Forbes decided that it might be useful to change locations for a broader range of subjects and colours.

Other artists who were painting in Brittany at the time and who Forbes may have met, were Norman Garstin, Nathaniel Hill, Joseph Malachy Kavanagh and Walter Osborne.

== Career ==
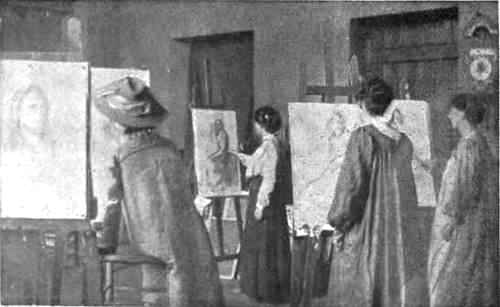
Ladies at work at the Newlyn Art School under the direction of Mrs Stanhope Forbes, from "Every Woman's Encyclopaedia", 1910

Having completed his studies in France, Forbes returned to London and showed works he made in Brittany at the 1883 Royal Academy and Royal Hibernian Academy shows. In 1884 he moved to Newlyn in Cornwall, and soon became a leading figure in the growing colony of artists. Of this place, Forbes said:

I had come from France and, wandering down into Cornwall, came one spring morning along that dusty road by which Newlyn is approached from Penzance. Little did I think that the cluster of grey-roofed houses which I saw before me against the hillside would be my home for many years. What lode-some of artistic metal the place contains I know not; but its effects were strongly felt in the studios of Paris and Antwerp particularly, by a number of young English painters studying there, who just about then, by some common impulse, seemed drawn towards this corner of their native land... There are plenty of names amongst them which are still, and I hope will long by, associated with Newlyn, and the beauty of this fair district, which charmed us from the first, has not lost its power, and holds us still.

The Slip was Forbes' first painting made in Newlyn. The artist colony received national attention with the Royal Academy exhibition of Forbes works in 1885. Henry Tate bought The Health of the Bride, which is now at the Tate Gallery in London. The exhibition of A Fish Sale on a Cornish Beach also brought notoriety to Forbes and the artist colony. He was one of the founders of the New English Art Club (NEAC) in 1886.

In 1892 Forbes became an Associate of the Royal Academy. Forbes was the founding chairman and trustee of the Newlyn Art Gallery beginning in 1895.

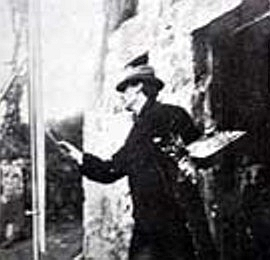
Picture of Stanhope Forbes, ca. 1890

Forbes and his wife founded the Newlyn Art School in 1899. It attracted students such as Ernest and Doris "Dod" Shaw, Frank Gascoigne Heath and Jill and Geoffrey Garnier. The Newlyn area had experienced an economic downturn as the result of failing fishing, mining and farming industries. The school helped to bring an economic resurgence to the area by encouraging individuals to vacation in the area and study and practise art.

His friends included Henry Herbert La Thangue, Blandford Fletcher and Charles E. Hannaford, who had also been a student. In Newlyn, Forbes tutored the landscape watercolourist Mabel Mary Spanton.

For a 1909 publish date, Forbes illustrated Mary Russell Mitford's Sketches of English Life and Character. Some of the illustrations were Old Cronies, Bringing Home the Milk, and February Sunshine.

In 1910 Forbes was elected a Royal Academician. Forbes became a member of the St Ives Society of Artists in 1928. In 1933 he was made a Senior Royal Academician.

In 1948, the Alastair Macintyre narrated ' Another World ', (now owned by the BFI), was released, in which Forbes was seen in his studio. His painting, ' The Quarry Team ' is shown being chosen by the St. Ives' gallery's selection committee.

== Works ==
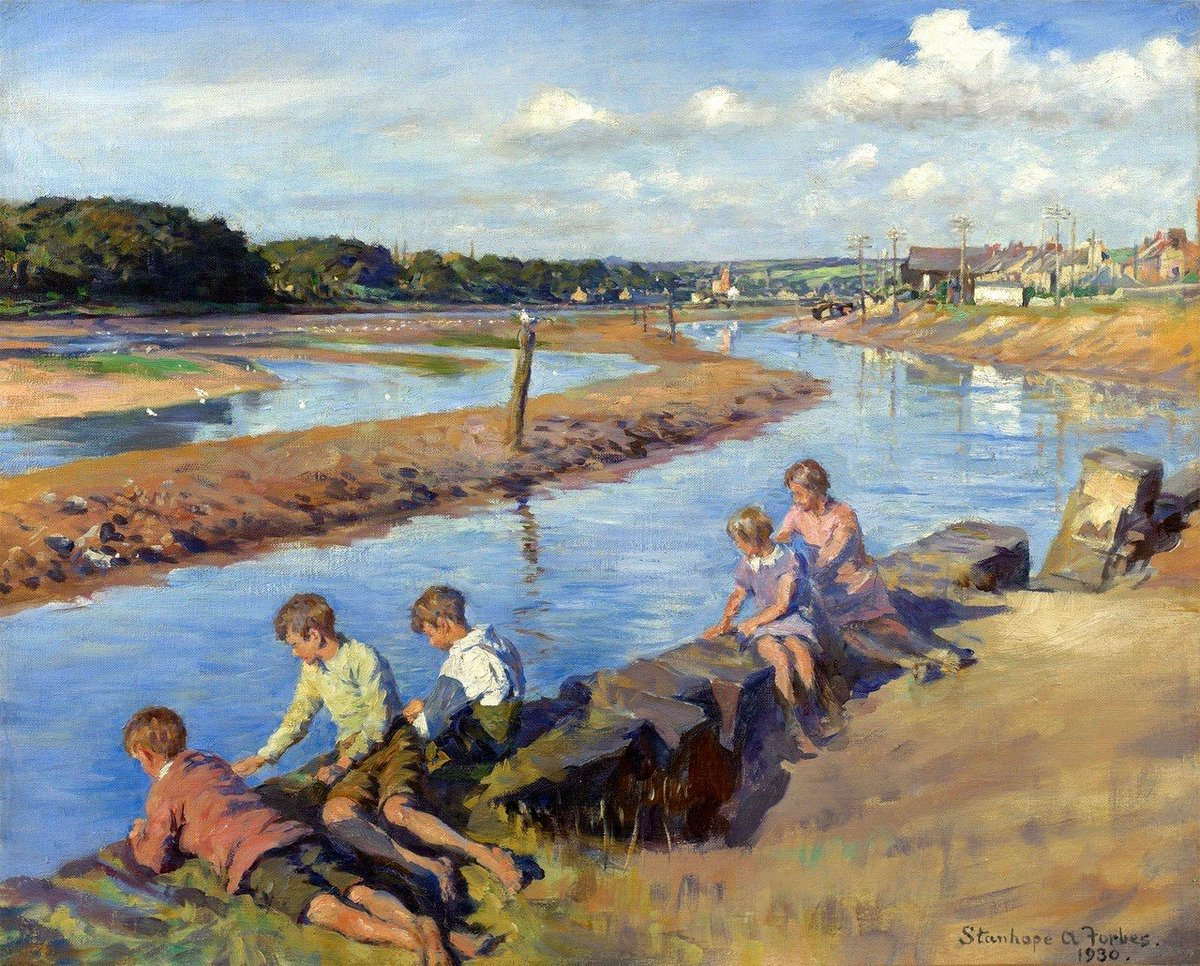
Young anglers at Hayle (1930)

Forbes generally painted genre scenes and landscapes en plein air. After a Day's Work, made in 1907, provides a snapshot of life in a small village in Cornwall. In it a man, covered to protect himself from the rain, leads his horse through the wet streets, which bare the light and reflection from light from inside a house. "With superb skill, the soft light is reflected off the rain-soaked road." A girl is held back from crossing the street by her mother until the man and his horse pass by.

Beyond his plein air painting, he also made interior scenes and was adept at capturing the "warm and charming" effects of lighting on a room and the people in it, such as The Lantern, made in 1897. More poignantly, Mrs. Lionel Birch writes of his style and particularly the painting The Health of the Bride: "[The painting depicts the] dominant note of his life's message, his sense of sympathetic humanity. These people in their humble little parlour, are real and living. Intolerant of all shams and false sentiment, the painter has made himself one with the people he depicts; he has understood the humour which lies so close to tears."

Of Forbes's works, Norman Garstin said: "he is a good unsentimental painter, his work has a sense of sincerity that appeals to everyone".

A partial list of his other works includes:

- A Street in Brittany, 1881, Walker Art Gallery, Liverpool
- Study of a Fisherwoman, 1884, oil on canvas, Penlee House
- A Fish Sale on a Cornish Beach, 1884–85, Plymouth City Museum and Art Gallery
- A Street in Newlyn, 1885, oil on canvas, Penlee House
- Off to the Fishing Grounds, 1886
- Their Evershifting Home, 1886
- The Sweet-stuff Shop, 1886
- The Village Harmonic, 1888, multiple light sources, exhibited at Royal Academy
- Palmistry, 1888, won Calcutta Gold Medal
- The Health of the Bride, 1889, purchased by Henry Tate. Made by Forbes with "sympathetic humanity"
- By Order of the Court, Fall 1889, 1890 Royal Academy Exhibition, International Exhibition of Berlin Gold Medal
- Portrait of Elizabeth Forbes, 1890, oil on canvas, Penlee House. On loan from Newlyn Art Gallery.
- Self Portrait, 1890, oil on canvas, Penlee House. On loan from Newlyn Art Gallery.
- The 22nd January 1901: Reading the News of Queen Victoria's Death in a Cornish Cottage, 1901, Royal Albert Memorial Museum, Exeter
- The Quarry Team, 1894, oil on canvas
- James Jewill Hill, 1904, oil on canvas, Penlee House
- Mrs Forbes (the Artist's Mother), 1910, oil on canvas, Penlee House
- The pier head, 1910, oil on canvas, Geelong Art Gallery, Victoria (Australia) (purchased 1912)
- Penolva, 1913, oil on canvas, Penlee House
- Second Lieutenant Alec Forbes (1893–1916) Duke of Cornwall's Light Infantry, 1916 Duke of Cornwall's Light Infantry Museum
- Abbey Slip, 1921, oil on canvas, Penlee House
- On Paul Hill, 1922, oil on canvas, Penlee House
- Poster for London, Midland and Scottish Railway Company project, 1924
- Relubbus Bridge, 1929, oil on canvas, Penlee House
- The Red River, 1933, oil on canvas
- Robert Cyril Morton Jenkins, 1939, oil on canvas. The piece is a portrait of the then Chief Constable of Penzance Borough Police, Robert Cyril Morton Jenkins
- Against Regatta Day, The Royal Cornwall Museum, Truro
- Regatta Day, oil on canvas, Penlee House
- The Blackberry Pickers, oil on canvas, private collection
- The Drinking Place, oil on canvas, Gallery Oldham
- The Lighting Up Time, The Royal Cornwall Museum, Truro
- The Seine Boat, The Royal Cornwall Museum, Truro
- The Violinist (Walter Barnes, Conductor of the Penzance Orchestral Society), oil on canvas, Penlee House
- The Young Apprentice (Newlyn Copperworks), oil on canvas, Penlee House
- Up Paul Hill, Penlee House
- The Great Fire of London 1666, painted 1899, mural at the Royal Exchange, London
- Destruction of the Second Royal Exchange in 1838, painted 1899, mural at the Royal Exchange, London

His works are in the collections of the Victoria and Albert Museum in London, Tate Gallery, Imperial War Museum in London, Penlee House, Royal Academy, Gallery Oldham, Queen Mary's Doll's House at Windsor Castle and in other museums in Britain, Australia and New Zealand.

The West Cornwall Art Archive, Penzance (WCAA) established the Forbes Reading Room in memory of Elizabeth and Stanhope Forbes. It contains books, files and information about art subjects related to the works of the Forbes and their students.

== Exhibitions ==
Forbes exhibited his work at the following:

During his life

- Carnegie Institute, Pittsburgh, PA 1912
- Dowdeswell's
- Manchester's Royal Institution, 1884+
- Newlyn Art Gallery
- Nottingham Castle
- Royal Academy, 1878+
- Royal Society of British Artists
- St Ives Society of Artists
- Whitechapel Gallery

Memorial and Posthumous Exhibitions

- 1949: Newlyn Art Gallery
- 1979: Artists of the Newlyn School
- 1981: Forbes Studio Sale, Newlyn Orion Benefit
- 1985: Painting in Newlyn
- 1987: Looking West
- 1988: The Edwardians and After, Royal Academy
- 1992: Painters from Cornwall, Royal West of England Academy, Bristol
- 1996: Now and Then
- 2005: Penlee House, Penzance Faces of Cornwall Exhibition (Portraiture)
- 2013: Two Temple Place, Amongst Heroes: the artist in working Cornwall
- 2015: Stanhope Forbes’ England, Worcester City Art Gallery and Museum
- 2017: Stanhope Forbes: Father of the Newlyn School, Penlee House, Penzance
- 2025: Elizabeth and Stanhope Forbes: A Marriage of Art, Worcester City Art Gallery and Museum

== Gallery ==
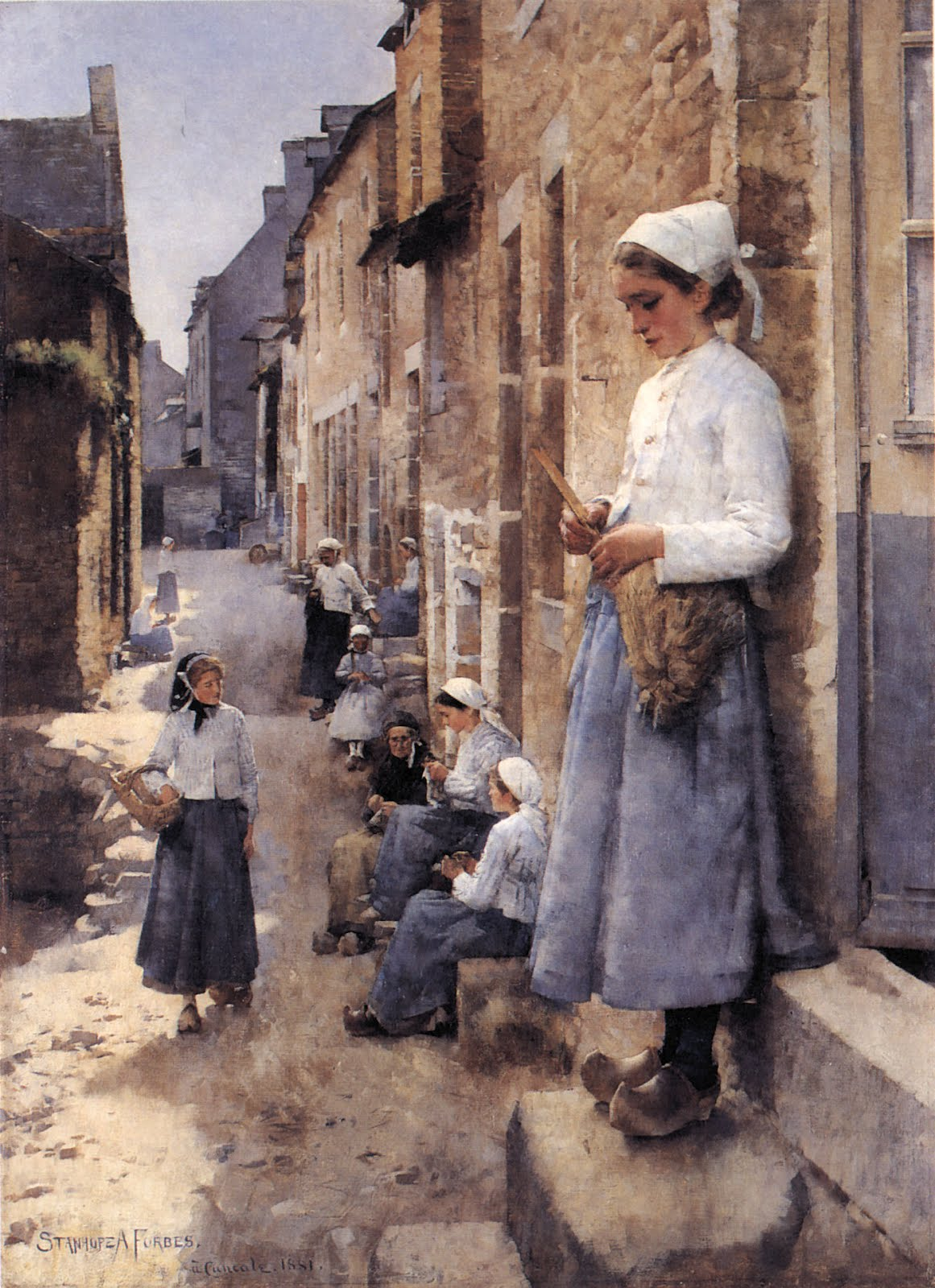
A Street in Brittany, 1881

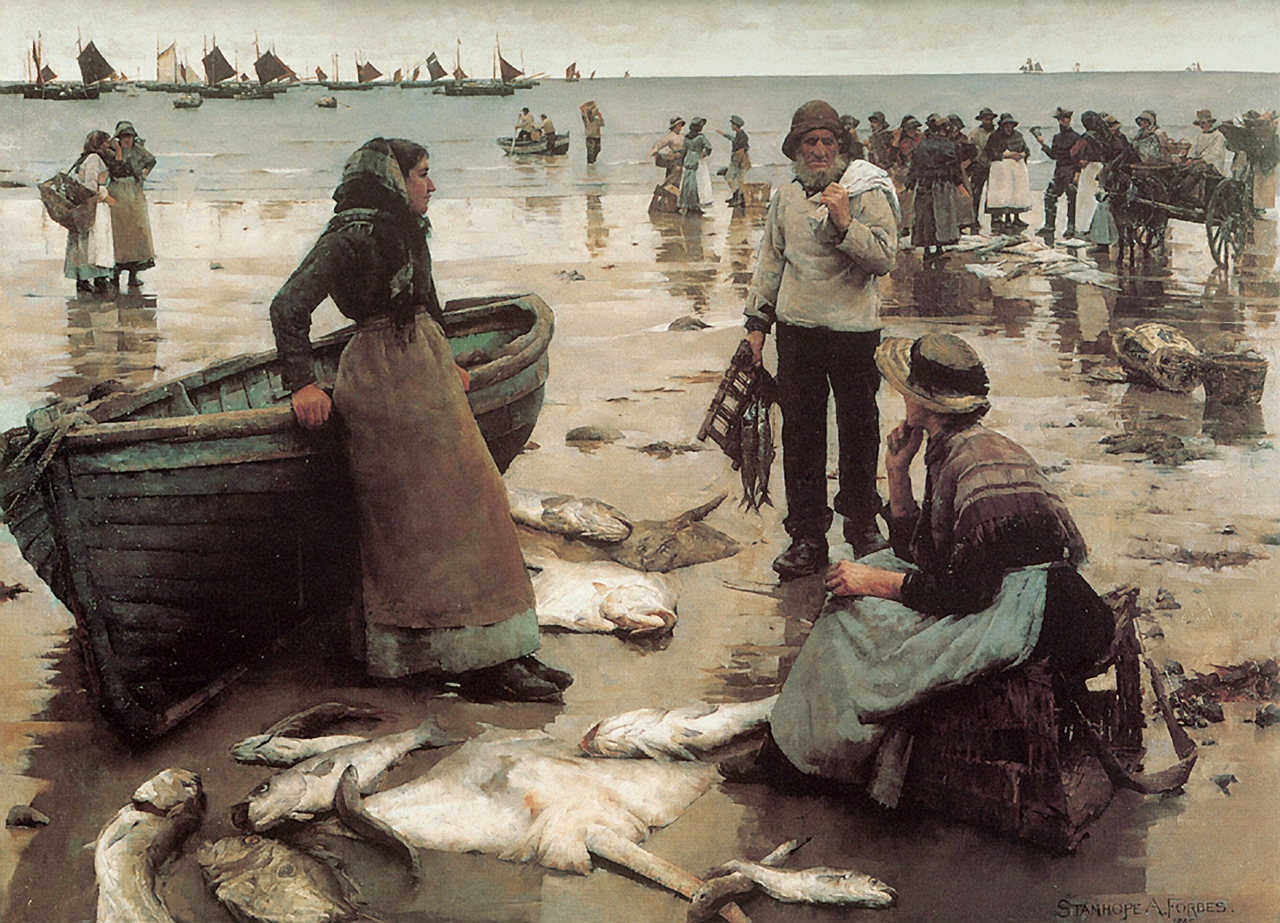
A Fish Sale on a Cornish Beach, 1885

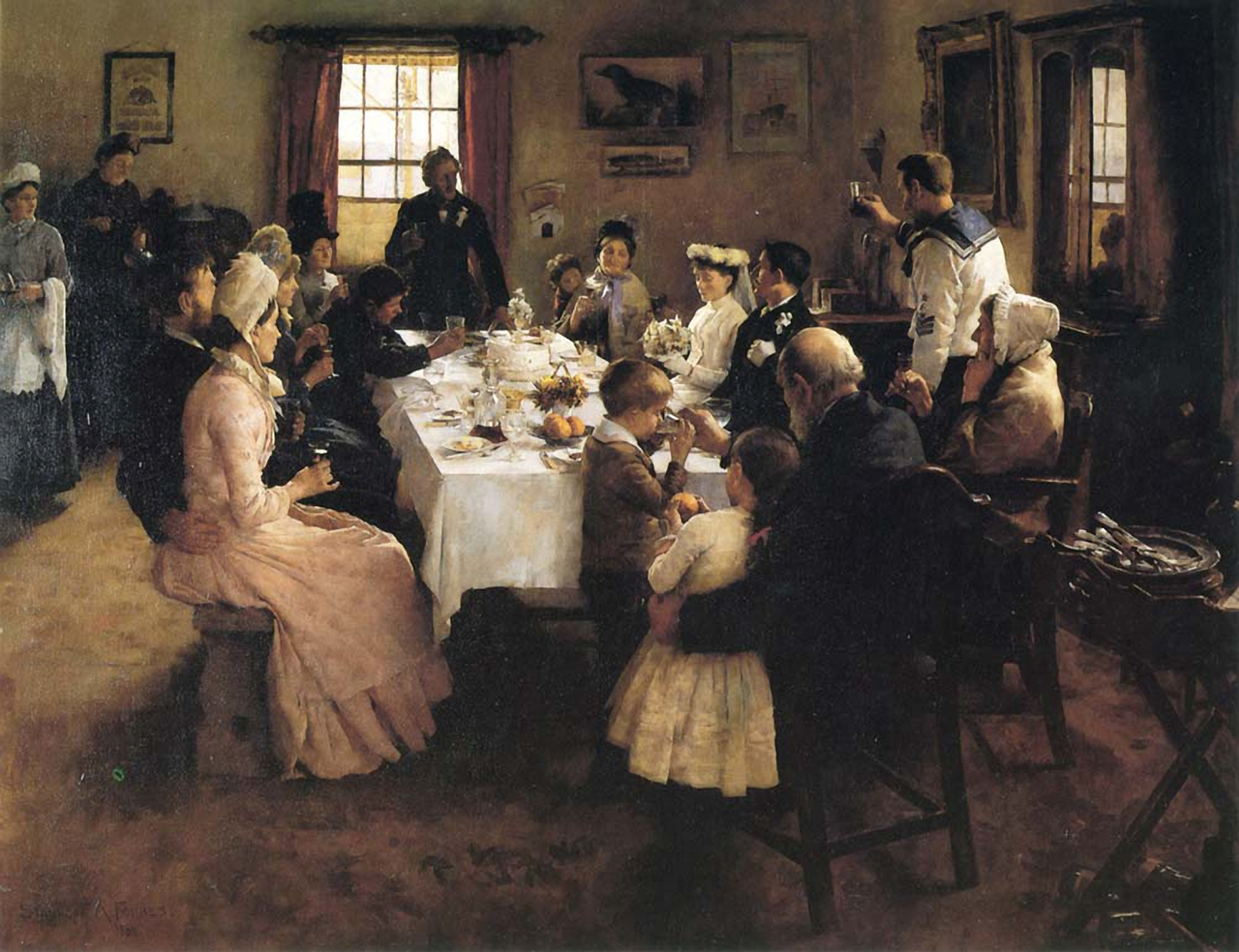
The Health of the Bride, 1889

The Lighthouse, 1892

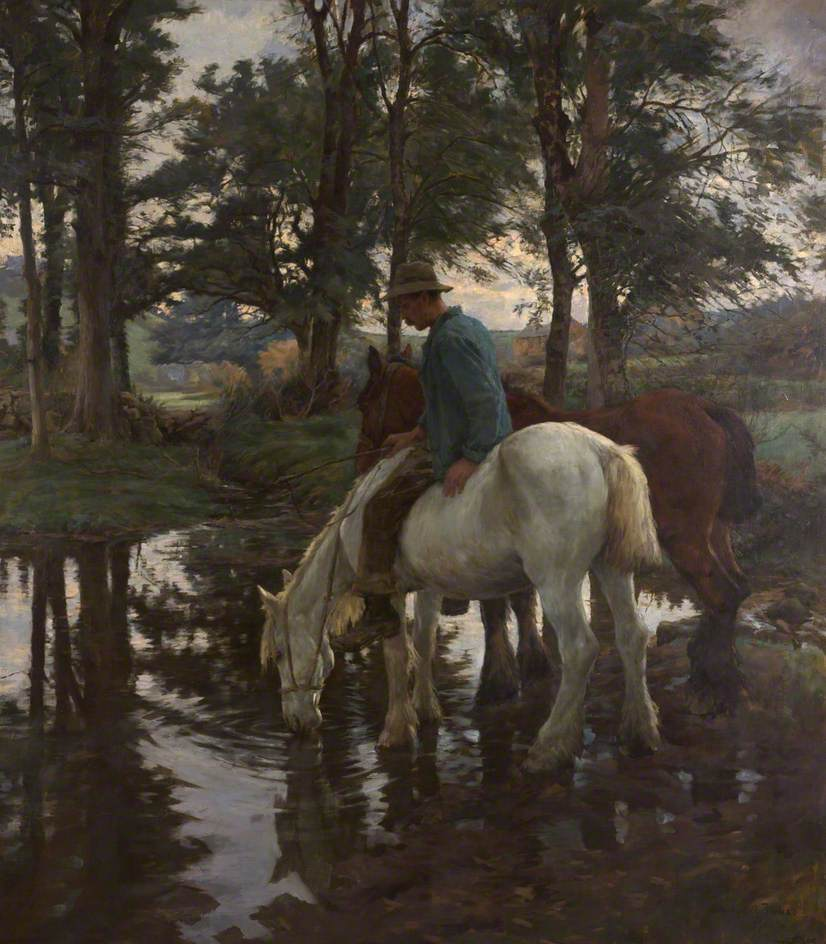
The Drinking Place, 1900

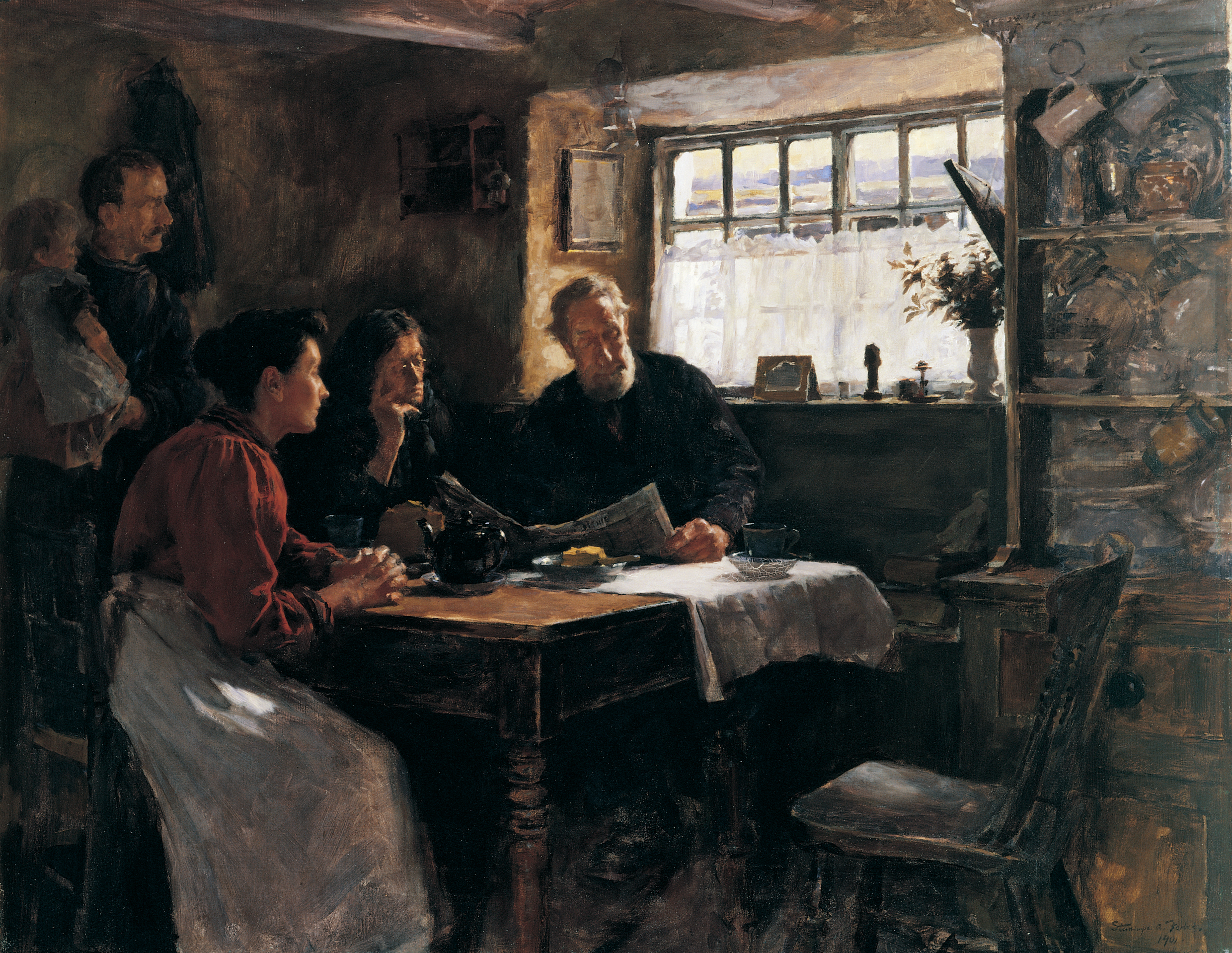
The 22nd January 1901, 1901

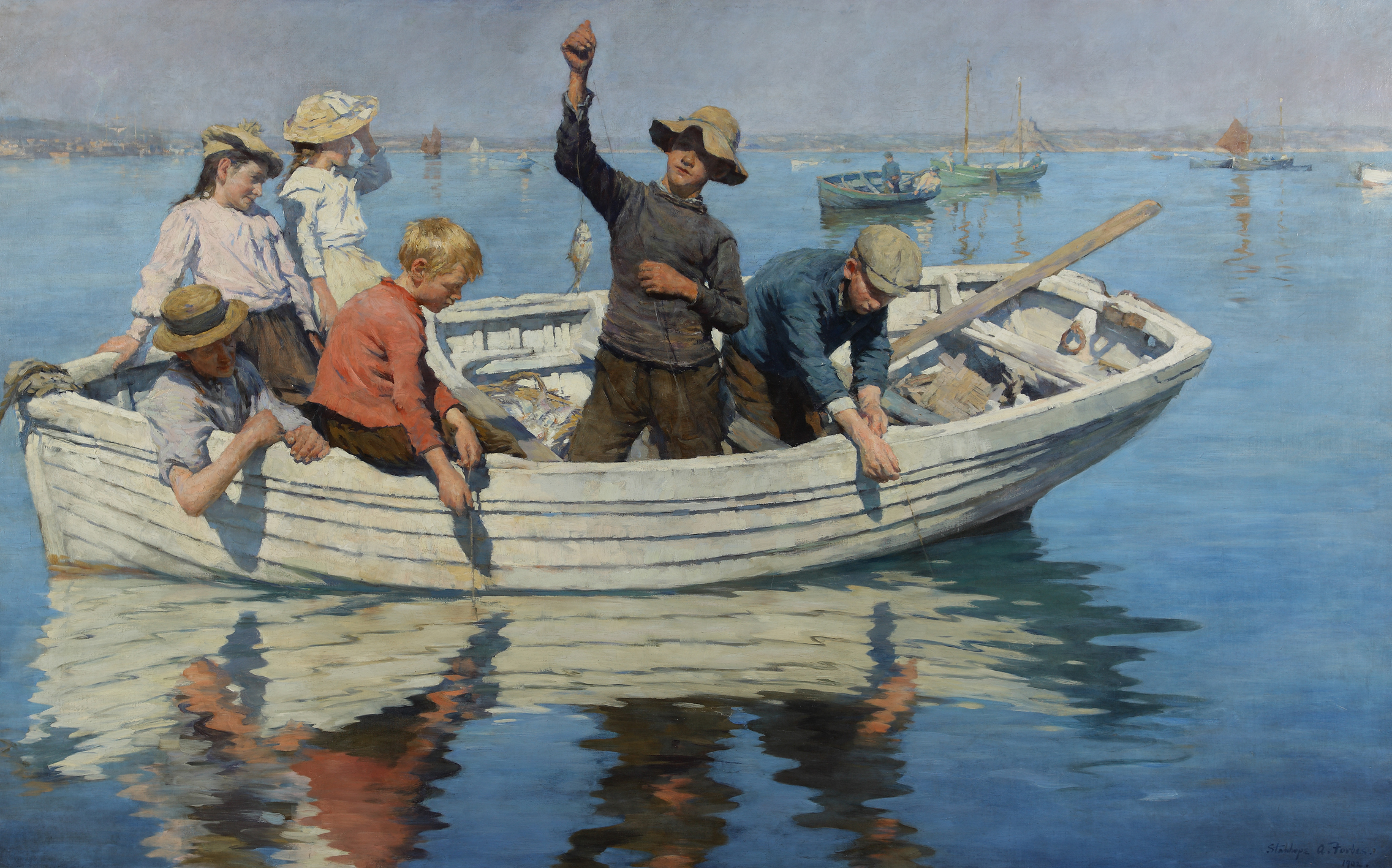
Chadding in Mount's Bay, 1902

Lighting Up Time, 1902

The Hay Cart, 1903

The Seine Boat, 1904

Home-Along, Evening, 1905

Gala Day at Newlyn, 1907

The Harbour Window, 1910

The Old Pier Steps, 1911

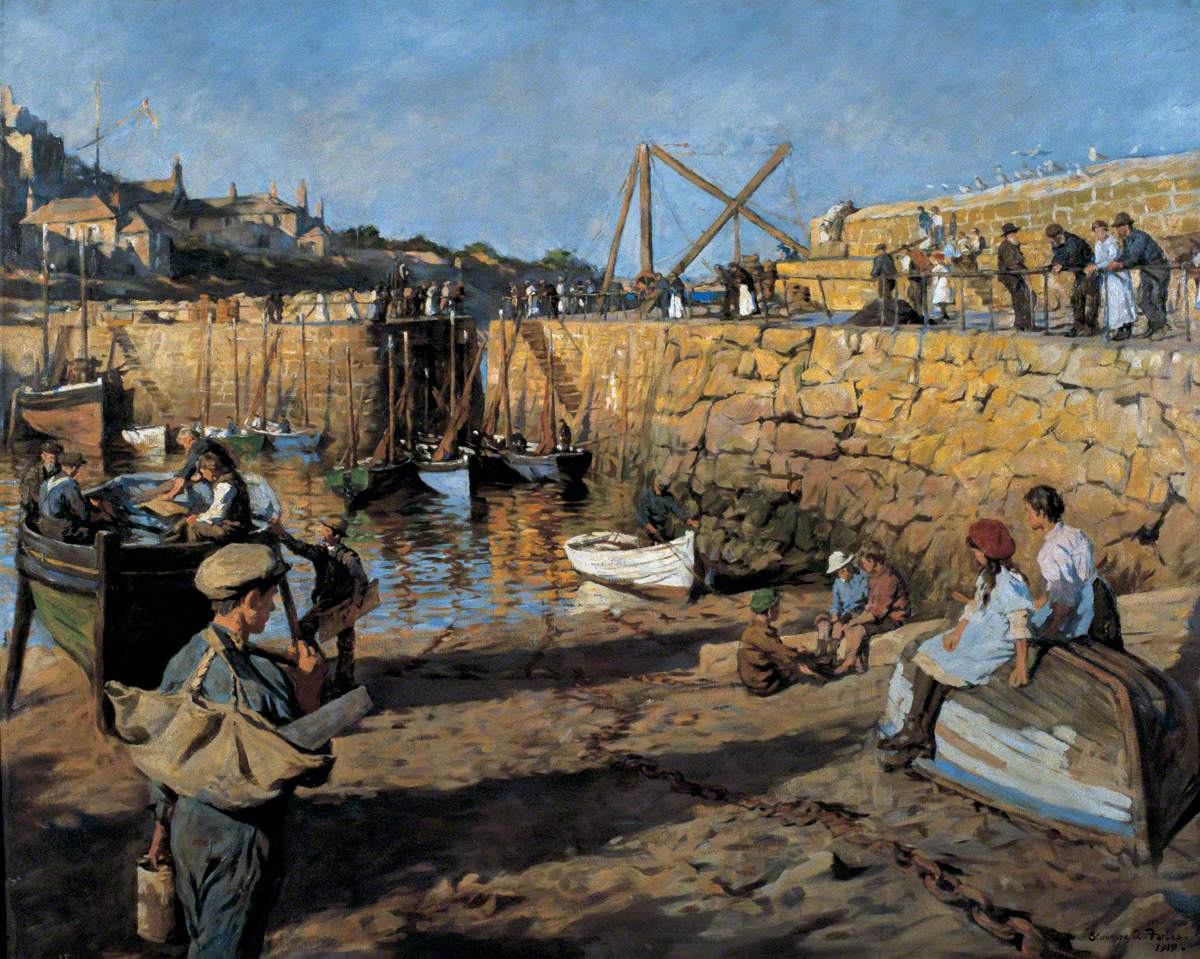
Fitting Out, Mousehole Harbour, 1919

Market Place, 1921

Florist and Fruiterer, 1923

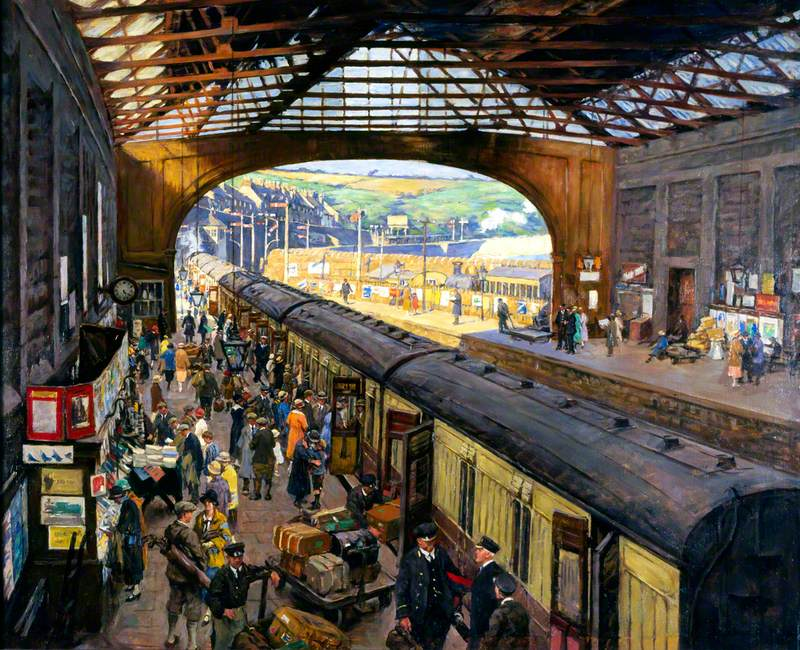
The Terminus, Penzance Station, 1925

Evening on the Bridge, 1937

== Publications ==
- Mary Russell Mitford; Stanhope A. Forbes (illus.) Sketches of English Life and Character. Henley-on-Thames: Foulis, 1924
- Stanhope A. Forbes. Stanhope A. Forbes the Slip Dublin 1857-1947. Richard Green, 2012. ASIN B009I49W8K
