= The Drinking Place =

Painting by Stanhope Forbes

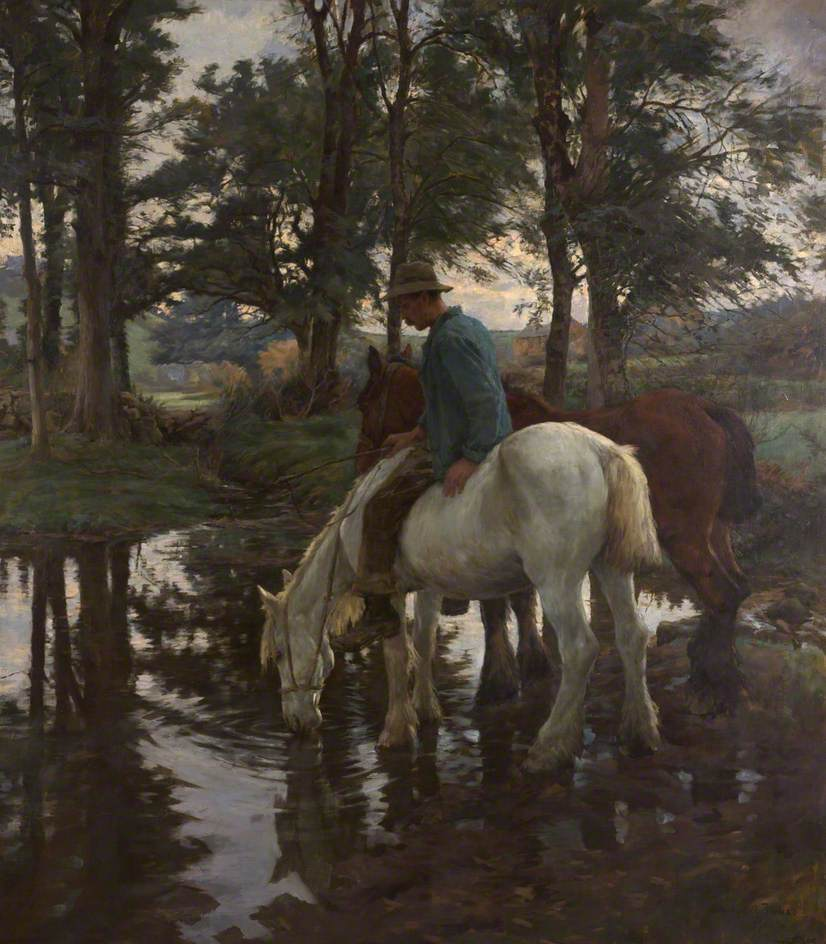
- Artist: Stanhope Forbes
- Year: 1900
- Type: Oil on canvas, genre painting
- Dimensions: 174 cm × 152.5 cm (69 in × 60.0 in)
- Location: Gallery Oldham, Greater Manchester

The Drinking Place is a 1900 oil painting by the Irish-born British artist Stanhope Forbes. A genre painting it shows a mounted rider with two horses, one of them drinking from a stream. It was produced en plein air in Cornwall.

Forbes was a key figure in the development of the Newlyn School with his wife Elizabeth, blending elements of Impressionism and Realism in his work. The painting was displayed at the Royal Academy Exhibition of 1900 held at Burlington House in London and was prominently reproduced on the first page of the illustrated catalogue of the year's pictures. The following year it was acquired by what is now Gallery Oldham in Greater Manchester directly from the artist.

== Bibliography ==
- George, Hardy. Artist as Narrator: Nineteenth Century Narrative Art in England and France. Oklahoma City Museum of Art, 2005.
- Jenkins, Adrian & Whittle, Stephen. Creative Tension: British Art, 1900–1950. Paul Holberton, 2005.
