= The Health of the Bride =

Painting by Stanhope Forbes

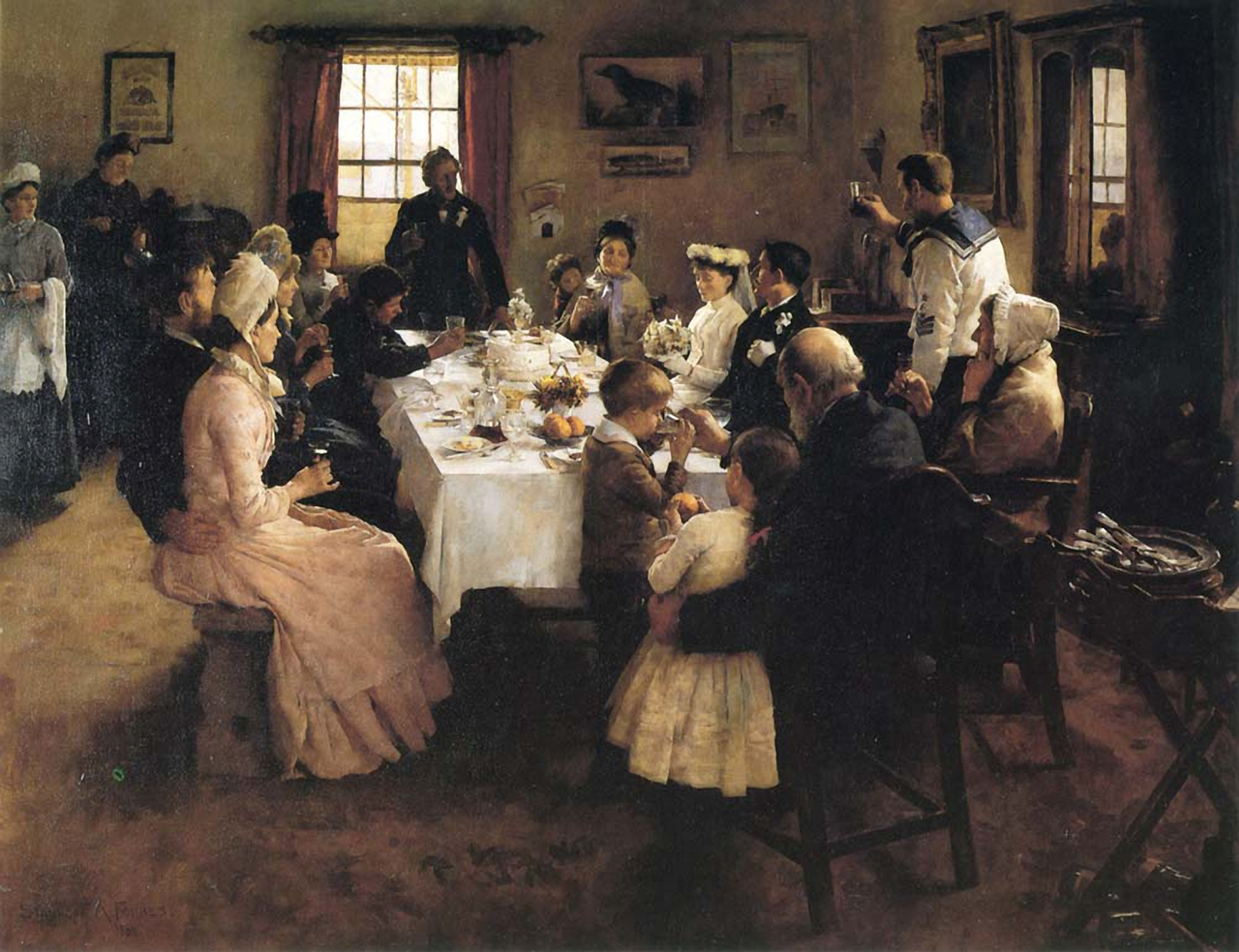
- Artist: Stanhope Forbes
- Year: 1889
- Type: Oil on canvas, genre painting
- Dimensions: 152.4 cm × 200 cm (60.0 in × 79 in)
- Location: Tate Britain, London

The Health of the Bride is an 1889 oil painting by the Irish-born British artist Stanhope Forbes. A genre painting, It shows a wedding party taking place, celebrating the marriage of a young sailor and his young bride. Forbes was a prominent member of the Newlyn School, which drew strongly on the influences of Impressionism and realism.

The painting was displayed at the Royal Academy Exhibition of 1889 held at Burlington House in London's Piccadilly. The picture was acquired by the art collector Henry Tate who in 1894 donated it to the Tate Gallery in Pimlico.

== Bibliography ==
- Day, Ivan (ed.). Eat, Drink & be Merry: The British at Table, 1600–2000. P. Wilson, 2000
- Kestner, Joseph A. Masculinities in Victorian Painting. Taylor & Francis, 2026.
- Thomas, Julia. Victorian Narrative Painting. Harry N. Abrams, 2000.
