= Frank Gascoigne Heath =

British artist

Frank Gascoigne Heath (1873–1936) was a British artist. After a brief time as a sailor he studied art extensively including in Antwerp and then with Hubert von Herkomer in Bushey. From 1901 was associated with Stanhope Forbes, painting en plein air, and began exhibiting his paintings at the Royal Academy. His early work shows the strong influence of the founding Newlyn School of artists but he later shifted when he settled nearby in Lamorna and was close friends with Laura Knight and Alfred Munnings. He was married to fellow artist Jessica Doherty who also studied with Forbes at Newlyn. He painted in a variety of different genres.

== Gallery ==
The Broken Melody, 1906

A Game of Cut-Throat Euchre, 1909

Children at the Seaside, 1910

The Gentleness of Heaven Is on the Sea, 1912

The Milk Cart, 1920

There Is Music in the Night, 1922

The Little Maid, 1923

== Bibliography ==
- Fox, Caroline & Greenacre, Francis. Painting in Newlyn, 1880-1930. Barbican Art Gallery, 1985.
- King, Averil. Newlyn Flowers: The Floral Art of Dod Procter. Bloomsbury, 2005.
- Windsor, Alan (ed.) Handbook of Modern British Painting and Printmaking 1900-90. Taylor & Francis, 2022.
