= William Forbes (railway manager) =

British railway manager

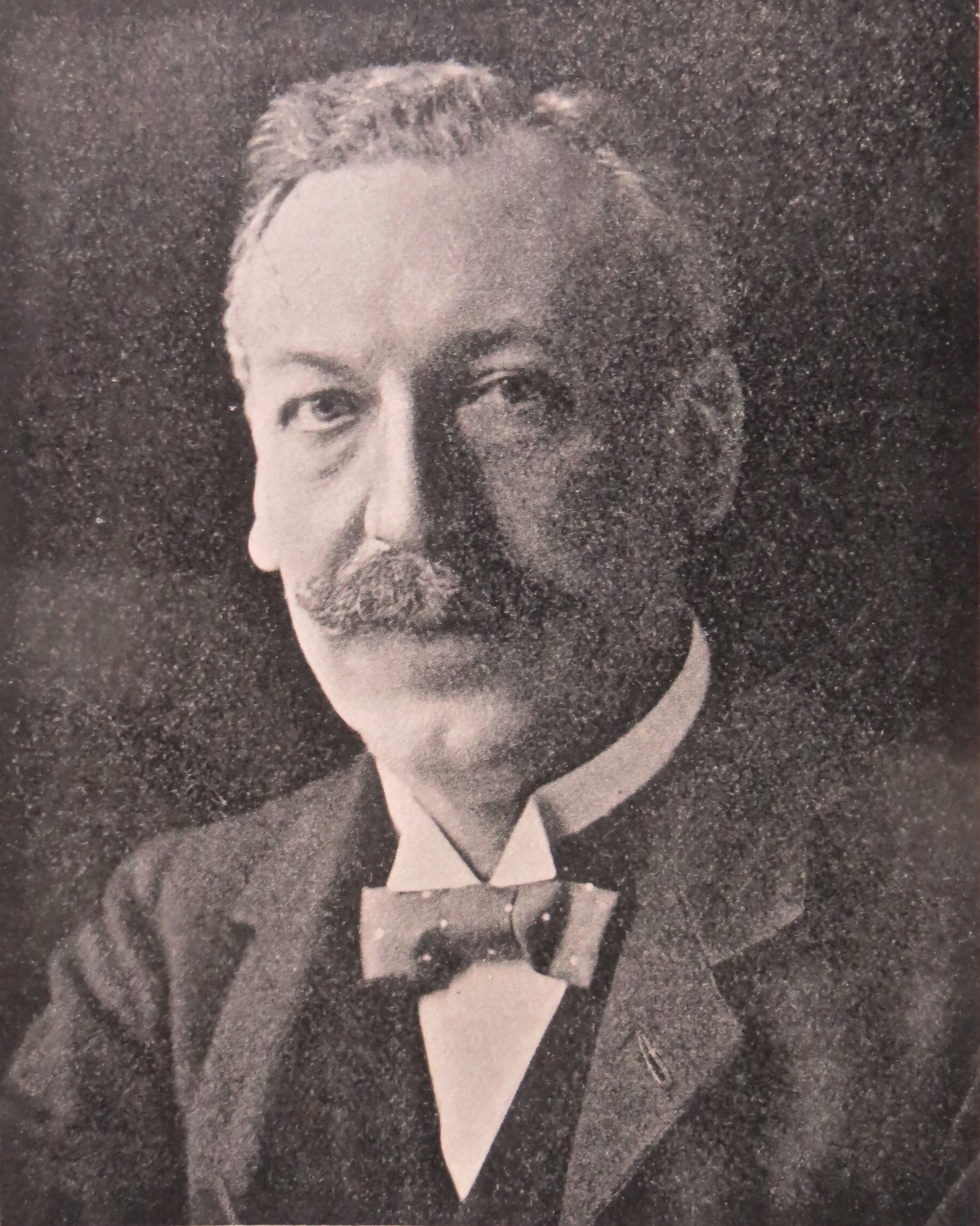
Sir William Forbes in 1915

Lt. Col. Sir William de Guise Forbes (21 June 1856 – 14 February 1936) was a British railway manager.

== Early life ==
Forbes was born in Dublin in 1856, the son of an English father, William Forbes, the General Manager of the Midland Great Western Railway, and a French mother, Juliette de Guise Forbes. He was educated at Dulwich College and on the continent. The artist Stanhope Forbes was his younger brother.

== Career ==
In 1873, Forbes joined the London, Chatham and Dover Railway (his uncle James Staats Forbes was the General Manager) in the goods department. After being in the Accountant's office and working as a Travelling Auditor, he became Continental Manager in 1889 and went on to be Traffic Manager and Assistant General Manager.

In 1899, he became General Manager of the London, Brighton and South Coast Railway, where he instigated the programme of overhead electrification, rebuilt London Victoria station, extended Pullman services, rail motor services and built the Quarry line. During the war, he was a member of the Railway Executive. He received a knighthood in 1915. He was also an officer of the French Legion of Honour, Belgian Order of Leopold, Danish Order of the Dannebrog and Lieutenant Colonel of the Engineer and Railway Staff Corps.

He retired when the Southern Railway was formed. He died at his home in Maida Vale in 1936.

Business positions
Preceded by John Francis Sykes Gooday	General Manager of the London, Brighton and South Coast Railway; 1899–1922	Company merged into the Southern Railway
