= A Fish Sale on a Cornish Beach =

Painting by Stanhope Forbes

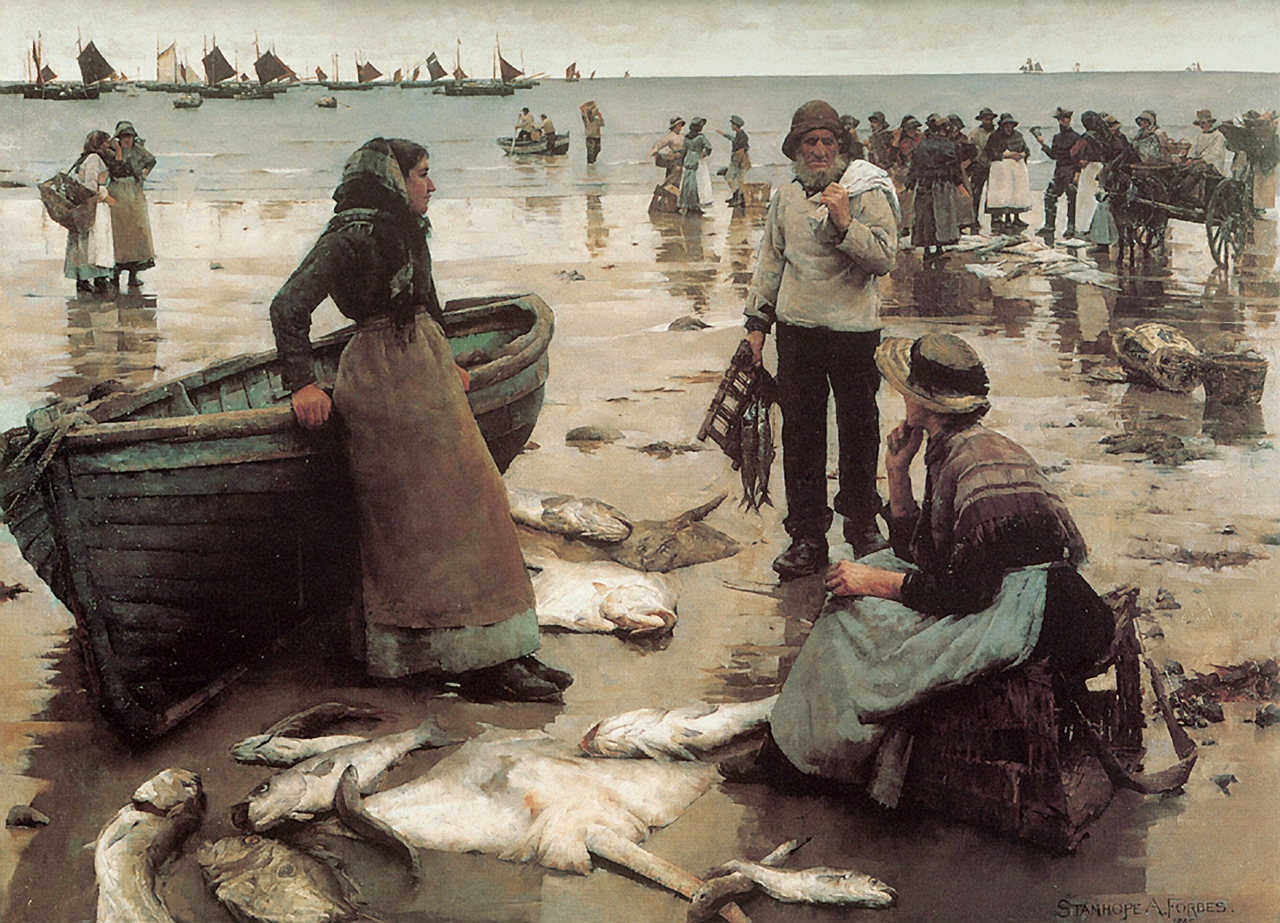
A Fish Sale on a Cornish Beach, 1884–85, Plymouth City Museum and Art Gallery

A Fish Sale on a Cornish Beach is an oil-on-canvas painting by Stanhope Forbes depicting a fish auction on the beach near Newlyn. It was painted in 1884–85 and exhibited at the Royal Academy summer exhibition in 1885. The painting is now owned by the Plymouth City Museum and Art Gallery.

== Background ==
Forbes was born in Dublin in 1857 and studied at Lambeth School of Art and the Royal Academy Schools. He travelled to Paris in 1880 and was influenced by the avant-garde taste for painting outdoors, "en plein air", and by the landscape paintings of French artist Jules Bastien-Lepage. Forbes also spent time in the artists' colonies in villages in Brittany, and his paintings from this period were exhibited at the Royal Academy after he returned to England. He settled in Newlyn in February 1884, where he became a founder of the Newlyn School of artists.

== Painting ==
Soon after arriving in Newlyn, Forbes started to make sketches for an enormous 9 × 5.5 feet (2.7 × 1.7 m) canvas entitled The Arrival of the Boats with the Fish and the People Crowding Round on the Wet Sands. Working outdoors on a monumental canvas proved difficult and he abandoned the larger work in June 1884 in favour of a smaller and more manageable 5 × 4 feet (1.5 × 1.2 m) work.

The painting depicts an auction of fish landed from rowing boats on the beach near Newlyn, where they were sold by an auctioneer known as a "jowster". The lug sails of the Newlyn fleet of fishing boats can be seen in the background, out on the water. The tide has recently gone out, leaving wet patches that reflect the sky. The painting depicts several fishermen and fishwives in traditional dress – the men wearing sou'wester hats, rough jumpers, oilskin trousers, and heavy leather boots. The women wear heavy aprons known as a "towser" and woollen shawls. The work was probably painted on the beach near the old medieval harbour of Newlyn, shortly before the new south and north quays were constructed in 1885–86 and 1888–1894, followed by a new covered fish market that opened in 1908.

== Reception ==
The painting was finished in early 1885 and exhibited to popular and critical acclaim at the Royal Academy summer exhibition that year, establishing Forbes' reputation. The success of the painting encouraged other artists to join Forbes in Newlyn, leading to the establishment of the Newlyn School. First owned by J. J. Brown in Reigate, it was sold at Christie’s in London on 30 June 1901 and was bought by William Turner. It was purchased by Plymouth City Museum and Art Gallery from William Turner in 1962, and is one of the artist's best-known works. A later work, The Health of the Bride, was bought by Henry Tate in 1889 and is in Tate Britain.
