= Henry Herbert La Thangue =

English painter (1859–1929)

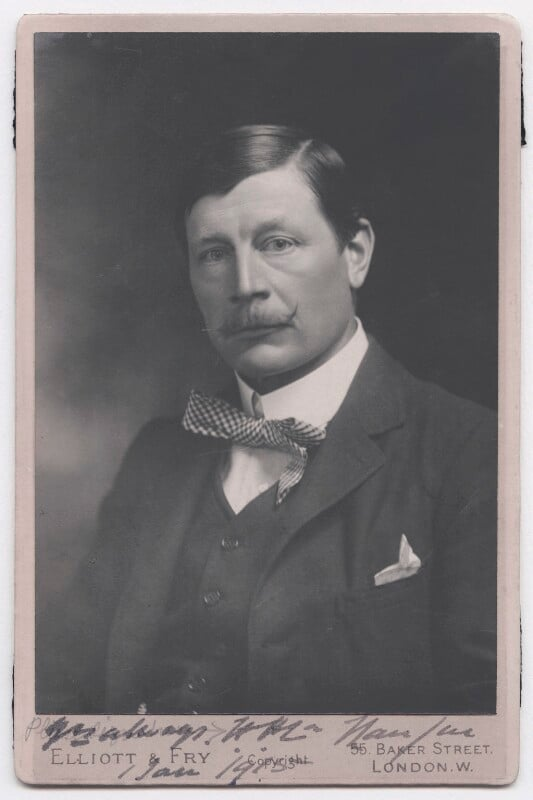
La Thangue in 1915

Henry Herbert La Thangue RA (19 January 1859 – 21 December 1929) was an English realist rural landscape painter associated with the Newlyn School.

== Early life ==
La Thangue was born in Croydon, Surrey, now a suburb of London, to schoolmaster Richard Henry La Thangue and his wife Clara (née Twisden). His paternal grandparents Robert and Elizabeth were both surnamed 'La Thangue' (probably distant cousins). In the 1700s the surname was 'Lethangie', a place in Kinross-shire, Scotland, from which the family takes its name. Henry was schooled at Dulwich College where he met fellow painters Stanhope Forbes and Frederick Goodall. He studied painting first at the Lambeth School of Art and then, from 1874 to 1879, at the Royal Academy, London, winning a gold medal for his work in 1879. This led to a prestigious scholarship for 3 years at the studio of Jean-Léon Gérôme at the École des Beaux-Arts in Paris. Here La Thangue came under the influence of the Barbizon school of open-air landscape painters, such as Bastien-Lepage and Dagnan-Bouveret, despite the fact that his teacher was strongly critical of the movement.

== Career ==
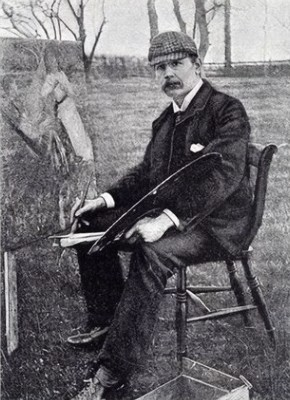
La Thangue at work c. 1890

Between 1881 and 1882 La Thangue spent some time painting on the coast of Brittany (one of his works from this period is The Boat-builder's Yard), then in Donzère in the Rhone valley (1883). He became a member of the Royal Institute of Oil Painters in 1883. He returned to England in 1886, exhibiting at the Royal Academy, Royal Society of British Artists (RBA), Grosvenor Gallery, New Gallery, Royal Institute of Oil Painters, and many regional galleries. He became involved in a failed attempt to reform the Royal Academy, helping to found the rival New English Art Club (NEAC) and exhibiting his work there.

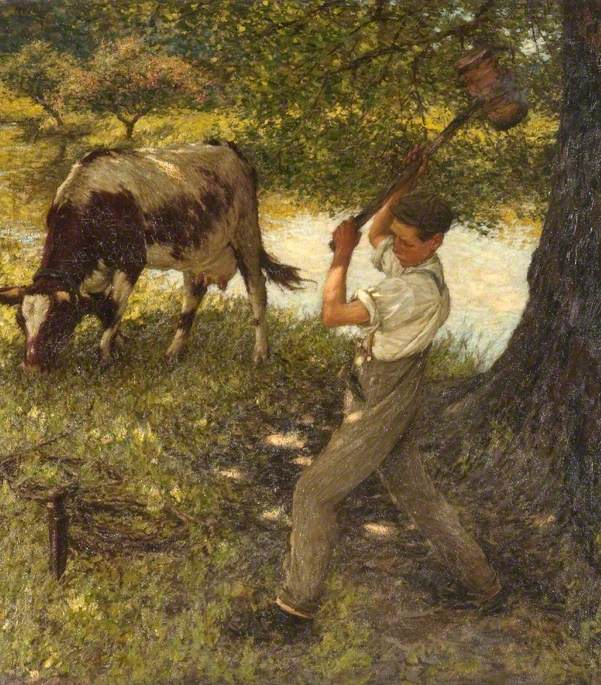
Stumping the Cow

In the late 1880s, La Thangue moved to South Walsham in Norfolk. A painting of this period, Return of the Reapers (1886), reflected his interest in photography and photo-realistic depictions. In the early 1890s he settled in Bosham, in Sussex, where he continued his large-scale rural genre paintings, some of which proved to be controversial. In 1896 Tate acquired The Man with the Scythe. In 1898 he was made an Associate of the Royal Academy, becoming a full Member in 1912.

La Thangue eventually made his base at Haylands in Graffham, Sussex, though he also spent much time painting in Provence in France (after 1901), Liguria in Italy (1903–11) and the Balearic Islands. His southern European landscapes were shown in a successful commercial exhibition at the Leicester Galleries in London, just before the outbreak of World War I.

In 1929 he was reportedly deeply affected by the loss of two of his paintings when the ship Manuka carrying them foundered off the New Zealand coast. In that same year he died in London on 21 December. On 26 December the paintings were recovered near Long Point, New Zealand, in fairly good condition.

== Personal life ==
La Thangue's wife Kate died on 22 September 1940 leaving a bequest of five of La Thangue's works to Australasian public art collections: Village Fountain, Provençal Fishing Boats, and Plovers on the Marshes to the Robert McDougall Art Gallery in Christchurch, New Zealand and The Weir and The Wood Gatherers to the Art Gallery of Western Australia, Perth.

== Legacy ==
La Thangue's work regularly reaches high prices at auction. In 2006, his "Packing grapes" was sold for £70,000 and in December 2009 "In the orchards" realised over £285,000.

== Gallery ==
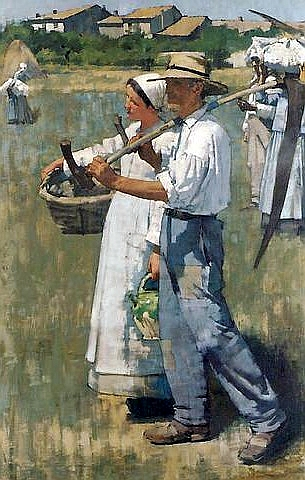
In the Dauphiné (1885)

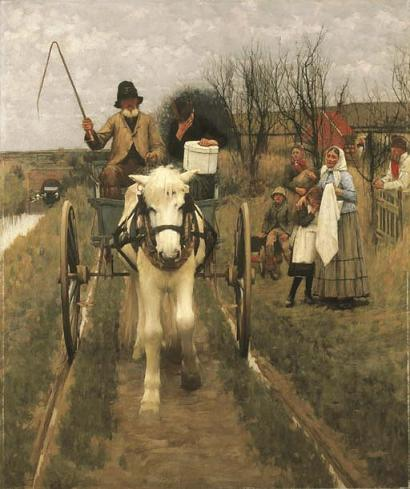
Leaving Home (1890)

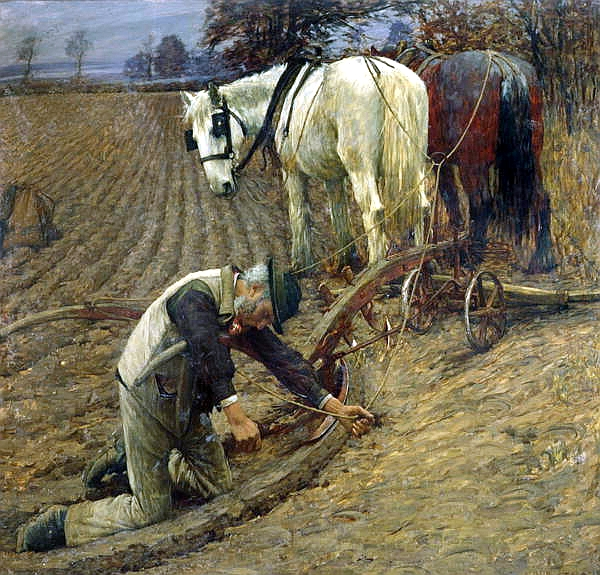
The Last Furrow (1895)

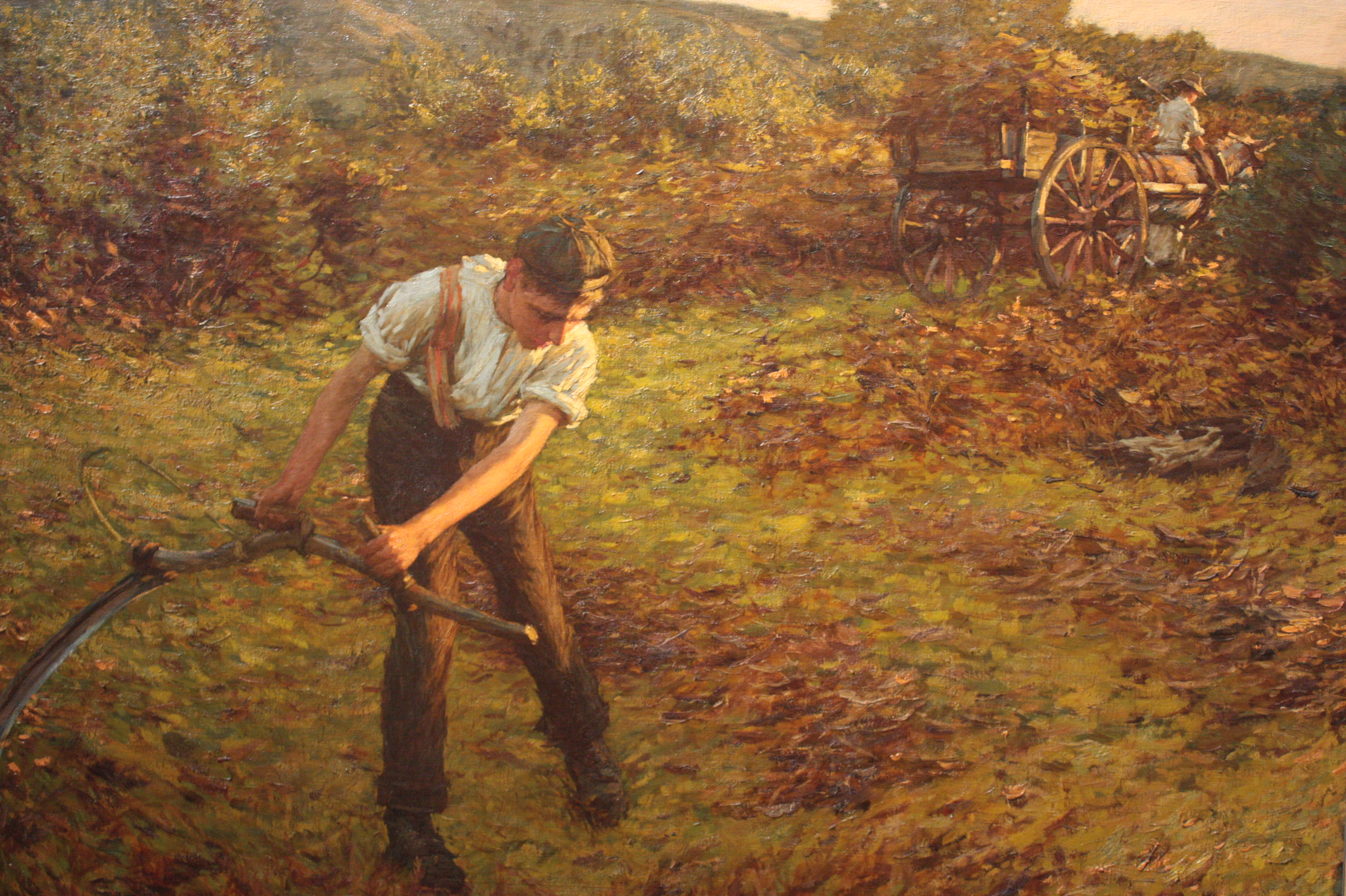
Moving Bracken (1903)

Violets for Perfume (1903)

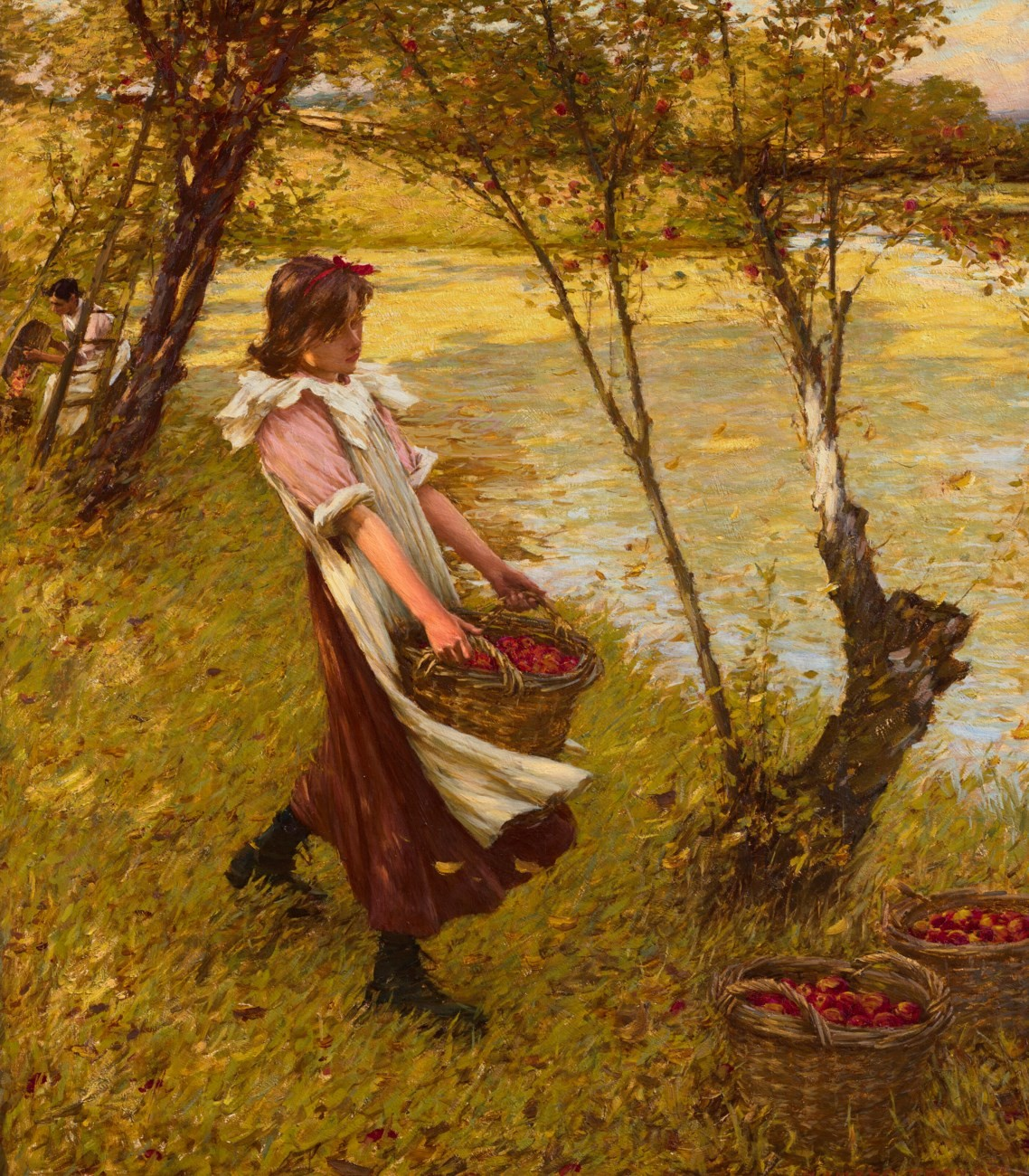
In the Orchard, Haylands, Graffham (1919)

A Spanish Mill (1921)

A Provençal Fountain (1922)

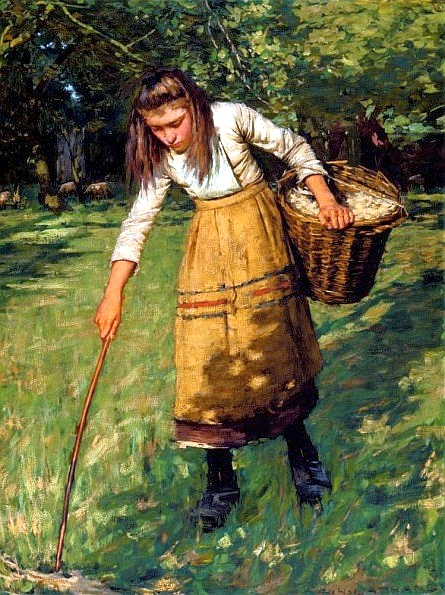
Gathering Wool (unknown date)
