= Claude Hotchin =

Western Australian businessman and art dealer

Sir Claude Hotchin OBE (7 March 1898 – 3 June 1977) was a businessman and art dealer, patron and benefactor in Western Australia. He is remembered for his support for Australian painters and Western Australian (especially regional) art galleries.

== History ==
Hotchin was born at Quorn, South Australia, a son of butcher Robert John Hotchin ( – ca.27 October 1909) and Bertha Mary Hotchin (née Brown, later Osborne) ( – 28 July 1938), a tailor. In 1905 the family moved to Broken Hill, New South Wales. After leaving Broken Hill's Burke Ward school, he worked for a few years as a junior clerk at the Town Hall and moved to Adelaide in 1914 or perhaps 1915, and found work as "oil boy" (paint technician), messenger and shop boy in the hardware store of Clarkson Ltd, 124–126 Rundle Street, Adelaide, which specialised in glass, paint and ceramic lavatory ware.

On 4 June 1925 he and his newly-wed wife, a daughter of the business owner Albert Edward Clarkson ( – ca.25 April 1936), moved to Perth as sales manager of the firm's Murray Street branch (previously Sedgwick Ltd.). In 1929 the store manager and local director, Charles Sutcliffe Harper, was promoted to general manager and full directorship, and Hotchin look his place as local director.

In 1928 Hotchin built "Mornington Flats" consisting of six self-contained two-storey flats on Colin Street, West Perth, which he sold in 1930.

In April 1932 the Murray Street building was destroyed by fire, and Hotchin and Harper bought out Clarksons (W.A.) Ltd., taking over premises at 94 William Street, Perth, opening on 1 June 1932. In 1940 Hotchin bought Harper's shares, business prospered, and in 1950 he was able to sell up and retire.

== Art ==
Hotchin had always enjoyed visits to art galleries and early resolved to purchase as many Australian paintings as he could afford. He began collecting seriously in 1937 with the purchase in Sydney of the oil painting Mutiny by Norman Lindsay. His home became a showplace of art and meeting place for artists. He was active in hosting art exhibitions at various venues, then in 1947 established the Claude Hotchin Art Galleries above Skipper Bailey's car showroom at 900 Hay Street, managed by his daughter Margaret.

In 1948 he inaugurated the annual Claude Hotchin competition for Western Australian artists which was to continue until 1973.

In 1950 he inaugurated the Claude Hotchin Silver Shield to be awarded annually for the business which best decorated its premises for the National Flower Day, held in September.

His gallery closed in 1951 when the space was required to cope with expansion of Skipper Bailey's business. During the five years it had been in operation, the gallery had hosted over 76 exhibitions and displayed over 3,000 original works of art. The centre has been made available free of cost to musical societies and art groups.

Between 1948 and 1977 Hotchin donated an estimated two thousand paintings to public art galleries, municipal councils and other public institutions through the State, notably the Royal Perth Hospital and the University of Western Australia. He donated five paintings to the CWA.

=== Perth Hospital ===
The Royal Perth Hospital Art Collection, is the largest such in Australia and consists of more than 1000 paintings, drawings, and other works, by artists such as Rupert Bunny, Sir Arthur Streeton, Norman Lindsay, Arthur Boyd, Kathleen O'Connor, Albert Namatjira, Charles Blackman, Jeffrey Smart, Howard Taylor, Robert Juniper, Guy Grey-Smith, Rover Thomas, Theo Koning, Ronnie Tjampitjinpa, Julie Dowling and Max Pam, displayed at the Wellington Street and the (now closed) Shenton Park campuses, a large proportion of which was contributed by Hotchin.

One of Hotchin's major donations to the R.P.H. was in 1954, when he contributed 31 original works and 50 prints to the collection. Of these works, Hotchin singled out for attention those by Allon Cook and Leach Barker.

=== The City of Bunbury Art Collection ===
This collection was based on 22 works donated to the City in 1948 by Hotchin. The city of Bunbury's collection continues to grow, assisted by the Bunbury Biennale, begun in 1993 as a means of purchasing contemporary works by artists of significance to Western Australia and the South West. In 1949 he donated the winning canvas in his 1948 competition, entitled "East of the City" and painted by Ernest Philpot, and in 1950 two works by Kathleen O'Connor and Robert Campbell.

=== The Geraldton Collection ===
In 1949 Hotchin presented a valuable group of around 22 paintings to the people of Geraldton and district. In a letter to E. H. H. Hall, M.L.A., he stated that the pictures would be from the brush of representative Australian artists, and requested that they be hung in a hall easily accessible to the public at all times, and hoped that his gift would be the basis of a district art centre to which he and others could make suitable additions. The paintings were:

- Old Hobart by Max Angus
- Princess Royal Harbour by Leach Barker
- Entrance to the Bullion Yard, Bank of England by A. B. Calvary
- 8alt Lake, Rottnest by Robert Campbell
- Morning Song by Elizabeth Durack
- Beside the Derwent by Tasman Fehlberg
- A Bowral Landscape by H. R. Gallop
- Reflections by Alfred S. Gant
- Day Wane by Tom Garrett
- The Swan Valley by James Goatcher
- Looking Towards the Spit by John B. Godson
- Head of the Brachina Gorge by Hans Heysen
- Evening by Cyril Lander
- Dancers in Pink by Bernard Lawson
- Finke Gorge, N.T. by Edwin Pareroultja
- Bunny Flats by John Podger
- Scene in Gippsland by H. Septimus Power
- Road to Mt. Gambier by Max Ragless
- Autumn by Ethel Sanders
- Peaceful Waters by Percy Tassell
- Evening Symphony by H. Van Raalte
- Shady Pastures by Harold Vike

=== The Albany Collection ===
Albany was the third W.A. country town to receive a gift of contemporary Australian art from Hotchin. The 33 paintings (originally to have been 34) included one work by an Albany painter, Leach Barker. The Lower Town Hall was to be refurbished to form the new Art Gallery. The paintings were:

- Tasmanian Landscape by Max Angus
- There Gleams a Splendour in the Grey by Leach Barker
- Glass House Mountain by Howard Barron
- Canberra by Thomas H. Bone
- Broken Light by Robert Campbell
- Rugged Coastline by Albert Collins
- Morning by Elizabeth Durack
- The Devil's Elbow, Murrumbidgee River by Gordon Esling
- Terrigal Beach by Herbert R. Gallop
- Deserted by Tom Garrett
- Fertile Valley by James Goatcher
- Bunnagorang Valley by John B. Godson
- S. S. Rotomahana by Harold Herbert
- Golden Afternoon by Hans Heysen
- Gathering Hay by Malcolm Hone
- Margaret by P. Ivor Hunt
- Ocean Symphony by Lionel Jago
- Perth from National Park by Cyril Lander
- The Cart Track by Bernard Lawson
- Mt. Flora by Leonard Long
- At the Great Barrier Reef by Louis McCubbin
- The Belgian Poet by Kathleen O'Connor
- Mount Razorback by Edwin Pareroultja
- The Resting Place by H. Septimus Power
- Mount McKinlay by Max Ragless
- The Pioneer by Margaret Saunders
- Toward Portland by W. Spence
- Bracken Banks by H. Van Raalte
- Encounter Bay by Robert Waden
- Petunias and Apples by Travis Webber
- Hillside Gums by Travis Webber
- Anemomes by George Whinnen
- The Boab Tree by Vlase Zanalis

=== The Shire of Plantagenet Collection ===
The Shire of Plantagenet Art collection was founded in 1956 through a significant bequest of 40 artworks from Hotchin. Over the years he continued to donate artworks with the last discernible gift being in 1972. The total number of works gifted to the Shire is 57, with most being permanently displayed at the Mount Barker Public Library.

The Shire of Plantagenet collection contains many important works by renowned 20th century Australian and Western Australian artists that make it one of the most significant local government art collections in Western Australia. It remains a testament to Hotchin's vision in bringing such quality artworks to the people of regional Western Australia.

The paintings were:

North Head, Sydney Harbour by Sir John William Ashton	Dinnertime Hill Arkaroola by Hilda Fehring	Lengthening Shadows on the Crop by Kenneth Robertson MacQueen	Victorian Coastline by William Spence
February Landscape, Albany by Portia May Bennett	The Picnic, Hunter River by Herbert Reginald Gallop	The Builders by Bryant McDiven	In the Everard Ranges by John Tribe
Sands of Nanarup by Leach Barker	Flinders Ranges by Alfred Gant	August Afternoon Rottnest by Frank Mills	Rugged Coastline by John William Tristram
The Brook by William Boissevain	Mouth of the Greenough River by James Goatcher	Wave, South Coast by Mary Marshall Nunn	Natures Bouquet by Lenora Uren
Tranquility by Ernest Bearsby	Salt on the Wind by Audrey Greenhalgh	In a Bohemian Atmosphere by Kathleen O'Connor	The Giant by Hennri Van Raalte
Peaceful Waters by William Merric Boyd (Snr)	In Old Lymington, England by Guy Edward Grey-Smith	Untitled (Nude Study) by Kathleen O'Connor	Towards Circular Quay by Hayward Veal
Wintry Day, Swan Valley by Robert Richmond Campbell	Robins by Charles Hamilton	Fisherman's Beach Long Reef by Dudley Parker	Still Life by Travis Webber
Pink Banksias by Ellen Chappell	Zinnias by Dorothy Millicent Hanton	Overlooking Happy Valley S.A. by Barbara Powell	Valley at Halls Gap by Travis Webber
The White Dinghy by Romola Clifton	Greek Fisherman by Margaret Johnson	River Lachlan NSW by Maxwell Ragless	White Gums at Bridge Water by George Whinnen
Patch of Light by Lucile Collins	The White Door by Daphne Jones	In the Derwent Valley Tasmania by Maxwell Ragless	Calendulas by Elaine Windza
Where the Irwin Meets the Seas by Allon Francis Cook	At Rottnest Island by Anthony Karafylakis	Yardie Creek, North West Cape by Peter Rohan	Valley of the Yarra by Dudley Wood
Desert Wind by Elizabeth Durack	Wembley Downs by Maurice M Kennedy	After the Bush Fire (Burnt landscape) by Marjorie Rowbotham	Mother and Son by Vlase Zanalis
Kimberley Morning by Kenneth Eades	Bluff Knoll, Stirlings by Laurie Knott	Still Life by Marjorie Rowbotham	
Near Hermannsberg Mission N.T. by Walter Ebatarinja	Hay Street, Perth by Cyril Lander	Marguarita by Margaret Saunders	
Flinders Landscape by Hilda Fehring	Christmas Trees of Western Australia by Anthony Lazberger	Picturesque Poverty by Yvonne Selby	

=== Katanning ===
In 1951 Hotchin offered a gift of 24 paintings to the people of Katanning and district, through the Katanning Road Board. The artists represented were:

- Leith Angelo
- Leach Barker
- George C. Benson
- Thomas H. Bone
- Robert Campbell
- Marshall Clifton
- Allon Cook
- Gordon Esling
- Tom Garrett
- J. M. Gilmour
- James Goatcher
- John B. Godson
- Dorothy Hanton
- Rolf Harris
- P. Ivor Hunt
- Cyril Lander
- Verners Linde
- Kathleen O'Connor
- Edwin Pareroultja
- Dudley Parker
- Ernest Philpot
- Max Ragless
- W. Spence
- V. R. Watt

=== Northam ===
In 1952 Hotchin presented 33 Australian original works of art to the people of Northam.

=== Narrogin ===
In 1953 he presented a collection of 30 paintings to the people of Narrogin, to be hung in the renovated lower Town Hall. Artists represented were:

- John Allcot
- Leith Angelo
- James Ashton
- Will Ashton
- Leach Barker
- Howard Barron
- George Benson
- Charles Buch
- Robert Campbell
- Ellen Chappell
- Marshall Clifton
- Allon Cook
- Rah Fizelle
- Iris Francis
- H. R. Gallop
- Tom Garrett
- James Goatcher
- P. Ivor Hunt
- Cyril Lander
- Sydney Long
- W. Mclnnis
- M. A. Montford
- Kathleen O'Connor
- Ernest Philpot
- H. Septimus Power
- Herbert Rabarer
- William Rowell
- Alan Stubbs
- Percy Tassell
- Hayward Veal

=== Collie ===
In 1954 the Collie Coalfields Road Board accepted a gift of 34 original Australian works from Hotchin to the Shire of Collie. In accepting the works the Board said that the council chamber would be eminently suited as an art gallery and would be kept open to comply with the donor's request that the works should be open to public view daily.

=== Claude Hotchin Art Prizes ===
The event was held annually in December at the Claude Hotchin Galleries commencing in 1948 and terminated around 1973. Two prizes were offered annually: £50 for oil and £25 for watercolour; from 1960 these prizes were doubled. The paintings were donated to the Royal Perth Hospital or to one or other of the country collections which he founded. The successful artists were:

Year	Oils	Title	Notes	Watercolours	Title	Notes
1948	Ernest Philpot	East of the City	Bunbury Art Gallery	(no separate prize)		
1949	Rolf Harris	On a May Morning, Guildford	Geraldton Art Gallery	George C. Benson	At Roleystone	Geraldton Art Gallery
1950	Allon Cook	Bindoon Valley	Albany Art Gallery	James Goatcher	Flooded River	Albany Art Gallery
1951	Allon Cook	scene near Scarborough	Katanning Art Gallery	Marshall Clifton	Low Tide	Katanning Art Gallery
1952	Cyril Ross	Thunderheads	Northam Art Gallery	Portia Bennett	The Dinghy	Northam Art Gallery
1953	Ernest Bearsby	Early Hours	Narrogin Art Gallery	Katherine Jarvis	Banksias in Sunlight	Narrogin Art Gallery
1954	Clem Ambler	Rain in the Morning	Collie Art Gallery	Maurice M. Kennedy	Rain in the Morning	Collie Art Gallery
1955	A. Karafylakis			Katherine Jarvis		
1956	Ernest Bearsby			Romola Clifton		
1957	Norman Aisbet			Cyril Lander		
1958	Allon Cook			Robert Alexander Matier	A Calm Departure	City of Fremantle Art Collection
1959	William Boissevain			Cyril Lander		
1960	Maurice Kennedy			A. Stubbs		
1961	Ailsa Small			Bryant McDiven		
1962	S. A. Smith			Leach Barker		
1963	Vlase Zanalis			S. A. Smith		
1964	David Gregson			Walter Terrell		
1965	(none awarded)			(none awarded)		
1966	Ailsa Small			(none awarded)		
1967						
1968				Robert Alexander Matier	In the Halls	Royal Perth Hospital
1969						
1970				Robert Alexander Matier	Pastoral	Royal Perth Hospital
1971						
1972						

=== Women artists ===
Hotchin's had an idealistic attitude to women which with today's sensibilities may appear patronising, but there is no doubt about his even-handedness in dealing with woman painters. Among those whom he exhibited prominently were: Portia Bennett, Irene Carter, Ellen Chappell, Julie Dowling, Elizabeth Durack, Iris Francis, Ella Fry, Audrey Greenhalgh, Dorothy Hanton, Katherine "Kath" Jarvis, Kathleen O'Connor, Ethel Sanders, Margaret Saunders, Ailsa Small

== Religious and civic life ==
Hotchin was an active member of the Methodist Church and lay preacher of the Congregational Church,

He was a member from 1930, and for many years Hon. Secretary, of the Perth Rotary Club and as such promoted the use of white canes by blind citizens. He was elected president in 1935.

He was active in with the Boy Scout movement (a district commissioner for the Subiaco-Hollywood district), and leader of the Perth Rover Scout crew. His support for Girl Guides of Western Australia included a display of his private collection at his Middle Swan home "Mandalay" in aid of the Guide camp "Paxwold". He was also a worker in the Y.M.C.A. of Perth, including a period as Chief Fellow of the Perth Y.M.C.A. Fellowcraft (a band of older members of the Y.M.C.A.). He was a member of the executive of the Chamber of Manufactures and president of the Adult Deaf and Dumb Society. He was on the board of the Tom Allan Memorial Orphans' Home.

He was a founding member of the Crippled Children's Society of Western Australia in 1938. He was a member (1947–1964) of the board of trustees of the Public Library and Museum and Art Gallery of Western Australia from 1947 to 1964 and chairman from 1960 to 1964 of the Art Gallery's board of directors. He served on the senate of the University of Western Australia from 1951 to 1969 and on the university's McGillivray Art Bequest committee from 1961 to 1973. He was chairman of the Arts Council of W. A. and chairman of the Jubilee Arts committee in 1951.

== Personal ==
He married Doris May Clarkson on 4 May 1925. Their first home was at Nedlands, but soon moved to "Mornington", 56 Colin Street West Perth. They had a home at Darlington for a short time, then "Mayfair" at 50 Colin Street, "Mandalay" (once the home of John Septimus Roe) at Middle Swan (near Caversham and Guildford) then "Chartwell" at Mundaring.

Their daughter Margaret was born on 25 April 1928 and married Douglas McPherson on 25 January 1952.

Hotchin was a tall man, impressive and charming, "one of the finest looking and sartorially perfect men in Perth" and an accomplished public speaker. His recreations included poetry, golf, swimming, motoring and gardening.

He died on 3 June 1977 in Albany, Western Australia and was buried in the nearby Allambie Park cemetery.

== Recognition ==
- In 1952 he was appointed an Officer of the Order of the British Empire (OBE) and was knighted in 1967.
- In 1974 he was awarded an honorary LL.D. in 1974.
- His portrait, painted by Ivor Hele, hangs in the Art Gallery of Western Australia.
- His portrait, by William Boissevain, was an entry in the 1957 Archibald Prize.
- His name survives in the Sir Claude Hotchin Bequest Fund and the Sir Claude Hotchin Art Foundation, both of which are used by the Western Australian Art Gallery to purchase works of art.
