= Mandorla Art Award =

Australian religious art prize

The Mandorla Art Award is an Australian religious art prize, where the artists are given a theme inspired by the Christian scriptures akin to the historic requests by the church to create visual images that tell the stories of the Bible.

The award commenced in 1985 with finalists work exhibited at New Norcia Monastery Museum and Art Gallery, St John of God Hospitals in Perth, Western Australia.

== Past winners ==
Year	Artist	Work	Theme
1985	Theo Koning	Re-creation	Creation (Revelations 15:3)
1986	Brian McKay	Logos	Christ – The Word of God (John 1:1–4)
1987	Michael Iwanoff	Standing with light	The Glory of God is Man Fully Alive (John 10:10)
1988	Allan Barker	Trust in providence	Trust in Divine Providence (Matthew 6:26–34)
1989	Ivan Bray	Samson, prepare the way	Prepare the Way of the Lord (Isaiah 40:3)
1990	John Paul	Ante lucem	The Annunciation (Luke 1:26–38)
1991	Nigel Hewitt	Jurien — peace I leave with you	Peace I leave with you, My peace I give you (John 14:27)
1992	Nigel Hewitt	Circumnavigation of the Soul	Glory as our Destiny (Romans 8:18–23)
1994	Ron Gomboc	At the Gates	The Prodigal Son (Luke 15:11–31)
1996	John Coburn	Blue for faith love and hope	The Greatest of these is Love (1 Corinthians:1–13)
2000	Julie Dowling	Born for you	Incarnation – The Birth of Christ (John 1:14)
2002	Brian McKay	The enigma of Christ	Images of Christ (Matthew 4:18–22, Mark 1:40–45, John 15:12–17)
2004 (Note: 2004 joint winner)	Michael Kane Taylor	Pedilavium	Whatsoever You Do for the Least of them, You Do for Me (Matthew 25:40)
2004 (Note: 2004 joint winner)	Lea Kuhaupt	Verse for the millions	Whatsoever You Do for the Least of them, You Do for Me (Matthew 25:40)
2007	Concetta Petrillo	Without finding any motive for his death, they condemned him and asked Pilate to have him killed	The Passion, Death and Resurrection of Christ (Mark 14:43–15:41, John 20:1–21)
2010	Annette Allman	Caring in a competitive world	And Who Is My Neighbour? (Luke 10:29)
2012 (Note: official website repeats 2010 data)	Annette Allman	Caring in a competitive world	And Who Is My Neighbour? (Luke 10:29)
2014	Paul Kaptein	untitled	(Note: no theme available)
2016	Megan Robert	The Bread Basket at Emmaus – then Flesh returned to Word	(Note: no theme available)
2018	Mikaela Castledone	God is in the House,	Rev 21:1-2 "And then I saw a new heaven and a new earth….”
2020/2021	Britt Mikkelsen	8200 Souls,	"He has told you, O mortal, what is good; and what does the Lord require of you but to do justice, and to love kindness and to walk humbly with your God? (Micah: Chapter 6, Verse 8)
2022	Claire Beausein	Chalice	Metamorphosis. "I am about to do a new thing; now it springs forth, do you not perceive it?” (Isaiah 43:19)
