= Marshall Waller Gervase Clifton =

Australian architect and artist

Marshall Waller Gervase Clifton (11 September 1903 – 3 December 1975), usually referred to as Marshall Clifton, was a Western Australian architect and artist known for watercolors.

== History ==
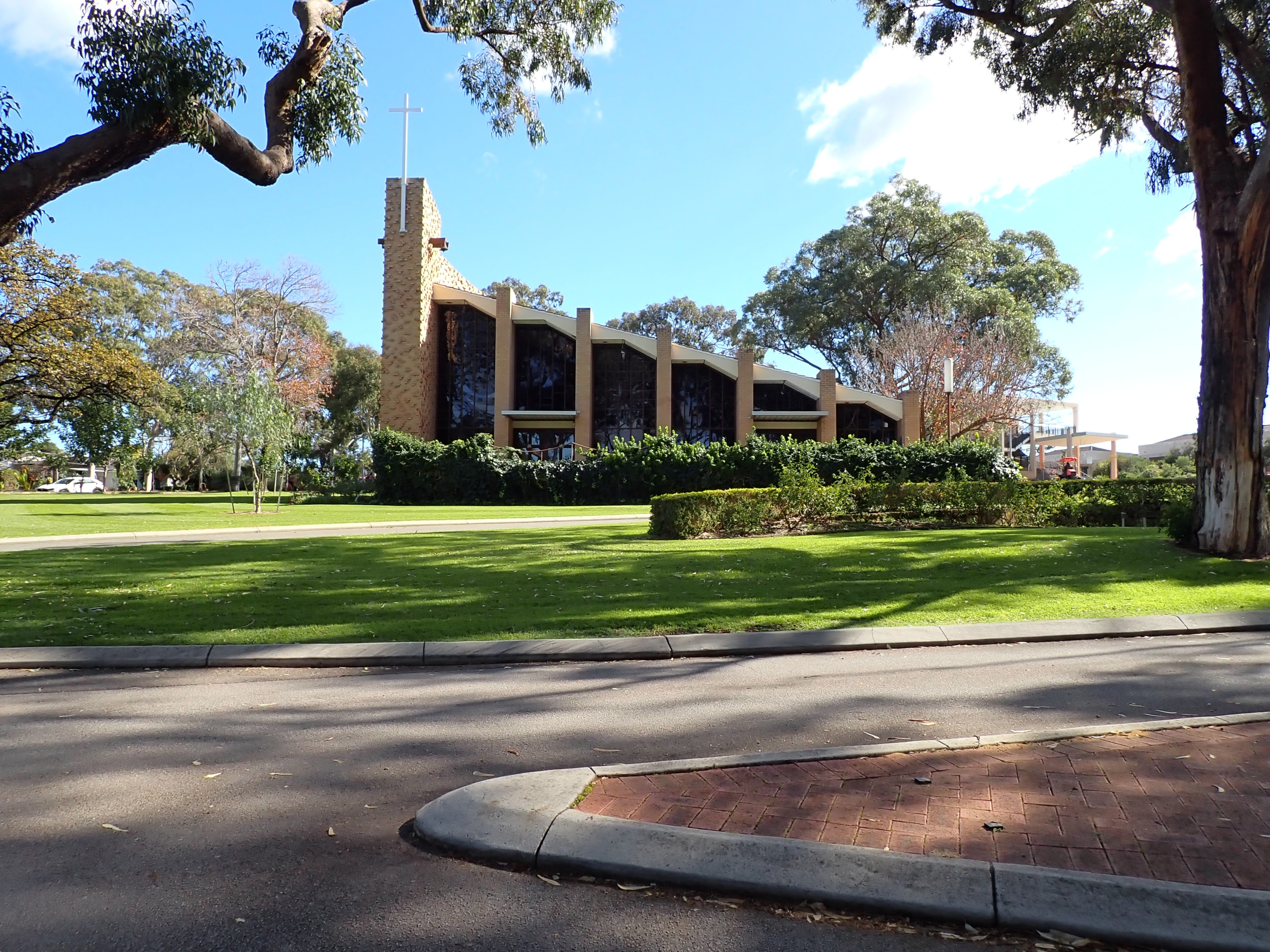
The state heritage listed Chapel of St Mark at Hale School, designed by Clifton

Clifton was born in Wokalup, Western Australia, a son of (Florence) Mabel Clifton, née Knowles, and Gervase Clifton. After education at Northam Senior High School he completed a four-year cadetship with the Public Works Department. In 1926 was admitted to the Royal Institute of Architects of Western Australia as an associate member, and in 1930 was elected assistant secretary.

In 1930–33 he made a trip to England to further his career, working for E. Vincent Harris and studying at the Royal Academy of Arts. During holidays he travelled by motorcycle through Europe, indulging his passion for painting making pencil sketches, mostly of architectural subjects. In 1936 he mounted an exhibition at the Newspaper House art gallery of 63 of his works. A critic from The West Australian found his pencil work appealing but his watercolours less so — suffering from overcrowding, they said. His larger paintings Santa Maria della Salute, Venice and St. George's Cathedral, Perth were reckoned the best by far, also suggesting he try his hand at drypoint and etching. He began a cadetship in Moscow but, despairing of the system, cut it short and returned to Australia. He wrote of his experiences in a 1933 issue of Architecture, an Australian professional magazine.

In 1930 Clifton and Herbert Parry won fourth place in an architectural competition conducted by the University of Western Australia, and in 1933 they went into partnership as Parry and Marshall Clifton, with offices in the T & G Building, St Georges Terrace, but soon moved to the Royal Insurance Building. They designed a block of four modern flats in Thomas-street, West Perth, a block of bungalow flats in Mayfair-street, West Perth, additions to the Masonic Hall, Geraldton, a hall for the Kondinin Road Board, a large residence in Claremont, new hall and offices for the Kulin Road Board and for the Kondinin Road Board. They designed rooms for the Country Women's Association, Northam.

The partnership was dissolved in June 1937. One of Clifton's first solo commission was a two-storey brick residence in Johnston Street, Mosman Park. Called the "Clifton House", it was influenced by his observations of Spanish architecture.

Clifton was a member of the Katanning branch of the Royal Western Australian Historical Society, and served as its artist and architect. He designed a memorial to William Dampier in the shape of a seaman's chest, installed at Broome.

== Family ==
Clifton married Nancy Millicent Hughes on 28 April 1934. Their daughter Romola Clifton was a recognised watercolor artist, winning several prizes in Perth — the Claude Hotchin Art Prize for watercolor in 1956 and the Helena Rubinstein Portrait Prize in 1960.

A useful aid to exploring the confusing structure of Clifton family, one of several important to the early history of Western Australia, may be found at Marshall Waller Clifton.
