= Kathleen O'Connor (painter) =

Australian artist (1876–1968)

- Self portrait c.1935
- Born: 14 September 1876; Hokitika, New Zealand
- Died: 24 August 1968 (aged 91); Perth, Western Australia, Australia
- Known for: Painting

Kathleen Laetitia "Kate" O'Connor (14 September 1876 – 24 August 1968) was an impressionist painter with a career in Western Australia and France. She was a daughter of the celebrated engineer Charles Yelverton O'Connor.

== Biography ==
O'Connor was born in Hokitika, New Zealand the daughter of Charles Yelverton O'Connor and his wife Susan Laetitia O'Connor (née Ness). She was educated at Marsden School, Wellington and by private tuition in Perth from 1891, including lessons from artist Florence Fuller.

She studied painting in Perth Technical School under James Linton and at the Bushey School, England, under Hubert von Herkomer. She worked for a time in fashionable department stores in Sydney then moved to Paris, France where she lived (apart from the war years which she spent, miserably, in London) from 1907 to 1950.

She exhibited regularly at the Salon d'Automne in Paris from 1911 as well as the Salon Française and Société des Femmes Peintres et Sculpteurs. In Perth she frequently exhibited at the Claude Hotchin Galleries, including several one-woman shows.

Sheltering in London during the two world wars, in 1948 she returned to Western Australia with crates of her paintings and sketches which were impounded at Fremantle, subject to 20% import tax. She was forced to destroy 150 works and pay duty on the remainder.

She returned to Australia permanently in 1955, living in Perth, but reluctantly. She probably never forgave that city for the callous treatment her father received which led to his suicide. She resented being away from Paris but could no longer afford to live there; her work was no longer fashionable and her private sources of income had largely dried up. She maintained, as far as possible, a Parisian lifestyle and was considered to affect an air of superiority. She could not countenance being buried in Australian soil and had her ashes scattered over the sea.

A portrait of O'Connor in 1966 by photographer Richard Woldendorp is held by the National Portrait Gallery in Canberra.

== Collections ==
- Art Gallery of New South Wales: Still Life, Paris – study in whites, and Nursemaids in the Luxembourg Gardens.
- Art Gallery of Western Australia: Flowers and Oriental Carpet (Algeria), and L'heure du thé.
- Cruthers Collection of Women's Art, Western Australia
- National Gallery of Australia: In the Studio.
- National Gallery of Victoria: Cherries in perspective, and Verging on the abstract.
- Queensland Art Gallery and Gallery of Modern Art: Between hours.

As a result of bequests by Sir Claude Hotchin, O'Connor is represented in most Western Australian regional galleries, including Bunbury Regional Art Gallery, Geraldton Regional Art Gallery, and the Shire of Plantagenet Art Collection.

The largest collection of her work, made up of 49 paintings, is held by the City of Fremantle Art Collection.

== Exhibitions ==
- solo exhibition at the Galerie J. Allard, in Paris in February 1937
- solo exhibition at Galerie Marseille, Paris in June 1953
- solo exhibition at Osborne Gallery in Adelaide 1965
- solo exhibition at South Yarra Gallery, Melbourne in 1966
- Retrospective exhibition at Art Gallery of Western Australia in 1967
- "Retrospective" at Art Gallery of Western Australia July, 1996
- at the Bunbury Regional Art Gallery in 2017
- "Being There - Kathleen O'Connor in Paris" at Walyalup Fremantle Arts Centre (Sep–Nov 2018)
- "Know my Name: Australian Women Artists 1900 to Now" at National Gallery of Australia (Nov 2020 to May 2021)

== Sources ==
McCulloch, Alan Encyclopaedia of Australian Art Hutchinson of London 1968
