= Rah Fizelle =

Australian painter (1891–1964)

Reginald Cecil Grahame (Rah) Fizelle (4 September 1891 – 25 October 1964) was an Australian artist and teacher.

== Biography ==
Rah Fizelle was born in near Goulburn, New South Wales. After training at Teachers' College Sydney, Fizelle joined the Department of Public Instruction and returned to Goulburn to teach. In January 1916 he enlisted in the Australian Imperial Force and fought with the 22nd Battalion in France raising to the rank of lance sergeant.

Upon returning to Australia in 1919 with some injuries Fizelle went back the Sydney Teachers' College to specialise in art under the Welsh born educationalist May Marsden. In 1921 Fizelle won a scholarship to the Julian Ashton Art School. From 1922 to 1926 he taught at Darlington Public School and attended evening classes with Aston. During this time he became known for his water colours.

=== Career ===
Fizelle returned to Europe in 1927, studying ath the Polytechnic School of Art, Regent Street, London and the Westminster School of Art under Bernard Meninsky. From 1928 to 1930 he developed his practice in Italy, producing simple, stylised geometric landscapes and watercolours. At this time his work was influenced by early Reniassance artists Giotto and Piero della Francesca. The Spanish artist El Greco was his favorite and a large influence. During this time Fizelle exhibited at the Royal Academy of Arts, London and the Salon de la Société des Artistes Français, Paris.

Upon his return to Sydney, Fizelle began to frequent The Modern Art Centre in Margret Street, Sydney, which fellow modernist Dorrit Black had founded in 1931, as the first exclusively modernist art gallery in Australia. Among the artists who exhibited here were Fizelle, Grace Crowley, Roland Wakelin, Grace Cossington Smith and Ralph Balson.

=== Death ===
Rah Fizelle died on 25 October 1964 at the Royal Prince Alfred Hospital, Sydney. He was survived by his wife, Edith Agnes Watson, née Collins.

== Collections ==
- Art Gallery of New South Wales
- Art Gallery of Western Australia
- National Gallery of Australia
- National Gallery of Victoria
- Newcastle Art Gallery
