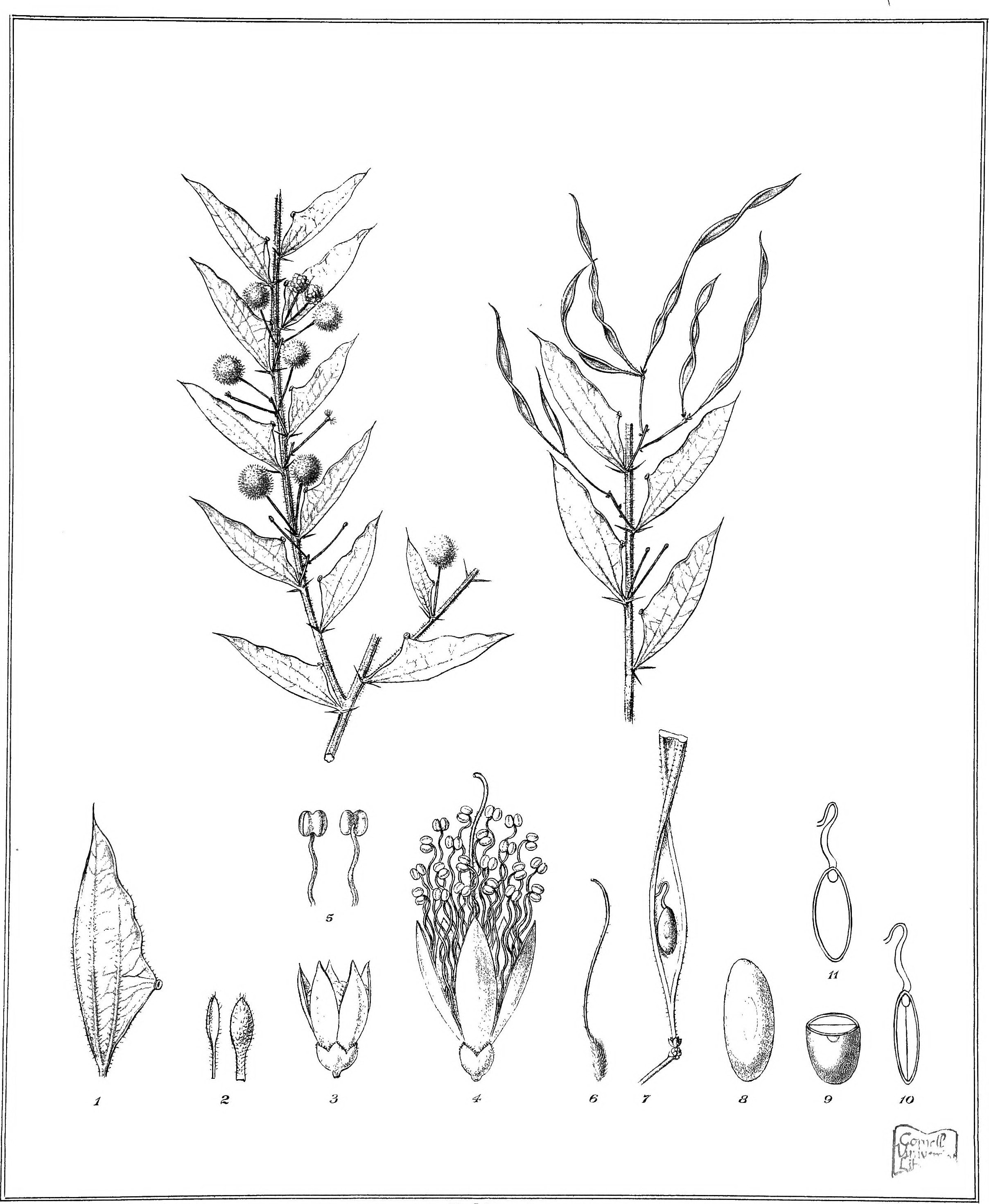
- Sketch from Iconography of Australian species of Acacia and cognate genera

Scientific classification
- Kingdom: Plantae
- Clade: Tracheophytes
- Clade: Angiosperms
- Clade: Eudicots
- Clade: Rosids
- Order: Fabales
- Family: Fabaceae
- Subfamily: Caesalpinioideae
- Clade: Mimosoid clade
- Genus: Acacia
- Species: A. scalpelliformis

Binomial name
- Acacia scalpelliformis Meisn.

= Acacia scalpelliformis =

Species of legume

Acacia scalpelliformis is a shrub of the genus Acacia and the subgenus Phyllodineae that is endemic to south western Australia.

== Description ==
The erect prickly shrub typically grows to a height of 0.5 to 2.0 metres (2 to 7 ft). It resembles Acacia urophylla but has some subtle differences including trowel shaped phyllodes that have a distinctive gland angle along the barely scalloped or notched adaxial marginh. The phyllodes have a length of 2.5 to 4 cm (0.98 to 1.57 in) and a width of 6 to 10 mm (0.24 to 0.39 in) with two main nerves per fact with a few less prominent lateral nerves. It blooms in September and produces yellow flowers.

== Taxonomy ==
The species was first formally described by the botanist Carl Meissner in 1848 as part of the Johann Georg Christian Lehmann work Plantae Preissianae. It is not too far removed from the Acacia myrtifolia group.

== Distribution ==
It is native to an area along the south coast in the South West and Great Southern regions of Western Australia between Augusta in the west and Denmark in the east where it is found in damp areas. It has a scattered distribution from around August in the south west to around Pemberton and Manjimup in the north to around Mount Chudalup in the east. It often occurs as scattered individuals among dense stands of Acacia urophylla.

== See also ==
- List of Acacia species
