= New Norcia Cricket Team =

Indigenous Australian cricket team

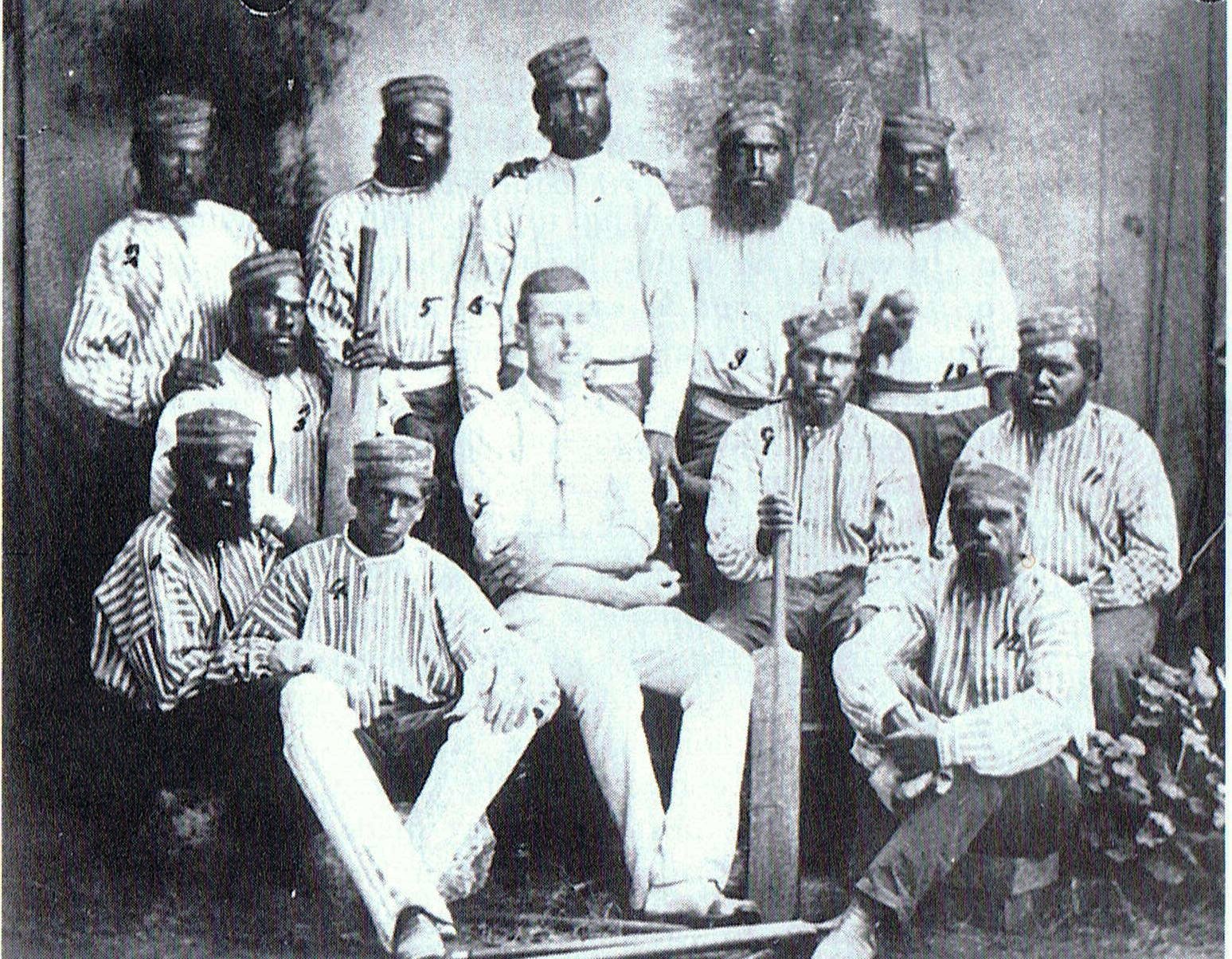
The New Norcia Cricket Team, early 1880s, captained by Henry Lefroy who would later become the 11th Premier of Western Australia. The star player was Johnny Blurton, back row, second from the right. Johnny Walley is back row, extreme right. Front row right and seated is Felix Jackimarra.

The New Norcia Cricket Team was a team of indigenous Australian cricketers captained by a pastoralist, who played in Western Australia between about 1879 and 1906. The team was established by the Abbot of the New Norcia missionary settlement, Rosendo Salvado who was a regular cricket watcher and believed that the formation of the team was "one more humanising and Christianising element" in his mission to Aboriginal people.

== The Invincibles ==
In his 2014 book, The Invincibles author Bob Reece sets out to show that the Aboriginal cricketers themselves initiated the team rather than local pastoralist Henry Lefroy being responsible for its introduction at New Norcia. And that rather than cricket being held up as a civilising force, the men were successful through hard practice, close ties and upbringing in a cohesive and supportive village community over two decades.

== History ==
The monastic township of New Norcia was established as a small missionary settlement by the Spanish Benedictines for the spiritual and welfare needs of local aboriginal people in 1847. It is about 130 km (81 mi) north-east of Perth—team members walked to Perth for their matches against the metropolitan teams.

New Norcia was within the Victoria Plains region north of Perth, an area dominated by the pioneering Lefroy family. A son, H.B. Lefroy had taken over his father's Walebing property in 1873 and regularly coached and captained the New Norcia team which initially played matches against teams from nearby Northam and York. Lefroy had a close association with a number of influential Perth men including J.C.H. James, a magistrate and cricket enthusiast who would become the inaugural president of the Western Australian Cricket Association in 1885. This association no doubt assisted in bringing the New Norcians as they were commonly known, to Perth and Fremantle in 1879 to help stimulate the local cricket scene. Henry Lefroy became Premier of Western Australia in 1917.

== Pre-WACA ==
Several years before the establishment of the Western Australian Cricket Association (WACA) in 1885, the team appeared on the struggling local cricket scene, dominating the Perth and Fremantle metropolitan clubs. Teams from Perth and Fremantle had been playing regularly since their first match on the Old Recreation Ground in Wellington Square in November 1852. It was not until the mid-1880s that the cricket establishment managed to excise part of the so-called New Recreation Ground (today's Esplanade) for a dedicated cricket facility. A few years later, in 1889, the association finally secured a 999-year lease on the then swampy 14½ acre patch of land to house the WACA Ground.

== Media attitudes ==
The local press generally reported on the team patronisingly, particularly in the early 1879 tour matches, but with acknowledgement and a degree of admiration for their skills. In what was clearly a surprise result, in their first match with Fremantle it was reported that "the poor despised blacks gained a victory by eight runs". In later matches the "noble savages" were described as having "remarkable agility and smartness". In the next match in Perth the home side needed eight runs to win in the second innings, but "owing to excellent fielding, six wickets fell for seven runs". In the second innings of match against Fremantle in 1881, Fremantle began needing just 49 runs to win. Soon however, the Aboriginal team had removed Fremantle for 17 runs – "the fielding was nearly perfect throughout. As catch after catch was taken, a perfect panic seemed to set in."

A few weeks after the Perth and Fremantle matches, a team from the Metropolitan Cricket Club (which had merged with the Perth Cricket Club in March 1878 and ultimately became the nucleus of the WACA) travelled to New Norcia where they stayed at the Mission building overnight. The following day's match saw the visitors win by a narrow margin.

== The players ==
The New Norcians often entertained the crowds before and after matches with athletic demonstrations such as throwing and running. One player, Johnny Walley had outstanding throwing skills and demonstrated his talent at a Perth match by throwing a ball at a bell-topper hat, placed on the ground 100 yards (91 m) away and successfully demolishing the hat on the first throw. At Fremantle he hit a folded umbrella fixed into the ground at a distance of 108 yards (99 m).

The star player however was all-rounder Johnny Blurton. Not usually the regular wicket-keeper, on one occasion he took the gloves and within a few minutes had effected a spectacular stumping. In 1881 The West Australian newspaper described him as "the best all round cricketer" in that team, "and perhaps in the colony". "Not only was his defence first rate but he drove the ball well, and always full and fairly with the face of the bat, his wrist play being so strong that he can hit a ball farther than men twice his weight and strength".

Other noted players were Johnny Maher, an opening bowler and prolific wicket taker and Jackimarra, a left-handed bowler. As well as Blurton, noted batsmen within the team included Walley, Jackimarra and Yappo. In a February 1886 match against the fancied Metropolitans, the New Norcians dismissed their opponents for 13 runs in their first innings. Maher took 6 wickets for 2 runs.

The team went into hiatus for several years, and was resurrected briefly in the early 1900s.

== See also ==
- Australian Aboriginal cricket team in England in 1868
