= Portia Mary Bennett =

Australian artist

Portia Mary Bennett (28 January 1898 – 1 May 1989) was an Australian artist. The daughter of William Albert Bennett, a harbour pilot from London, and Portia Bohannah Booth, born in Australia, she was born in Balmain, a suburb of Sydney. Her father drowned while she was still young. She was educated at Fort Street Girls' High School and then studied with Antonio Dattilo Rubbo at the school of the Art Society of New South Wales. She attended the Sydney Teachers' College, studying art there with May Marsden. She also attended the Julian Ashton Art School. She taught at Chatswood Intermediate School and Darlington Public School and then, from 1921 to 1925, was on the teaching staff of the Sydney Teachers' College. In 1933, she was a founding member of the Perth Society of Artists.

In 1925, she married William Henry James Wallace, a marine engineer, and moved to Brisbane with him. In 1932, they moved to Perth. The couple had four children.

She worked mainly in watercolour, painting outdoors. Her subjects included boats, landscapes and cityscapes of Perth. She was particularly interested in the architecture of the city, as well as scenes of urban life. Bennett won the watercolour prize from the Perth Society of Artists in 1951 and, in 1952, was awarded the Claude Hotchin Art Prize for watercolour. The University of Western Australia held a retrospective of her work in 1986.

She died at home in Nedlands, a suburb of Perth, at the age of 91.

Her work is held in the collections of the National Gallery of Australia, the Art Gallery of Western Australia and the Holmes à Court Gallery. In 2005, some of her artworks were included in an exhibition of images of Perth over the years which was held at the Perth town hall.
