= William Boissevain =

Australian painter (1927–2023)

William "Wim" Boissevain (23 July 1927 – 24 July 2023) was an Australian painter.

== Biography ==
Of Dutch extraction, he was born Willem Geoffrey Boissevain in New York. His father, Gideon Walrave Boissevain, was in the Dutch diplomatic service.

Boissevain studied at the Central School of Arts and Crafts, London and the École nationale supérieure des Beaux-Arts, Paris. He arrived in Australia in 1947, became naturalised in 1949, and established a studio at Glen Forrest in the Darling Range near Perth.

From 1951 to 1955 he taught drawing and French at Wesley College, Perth, later at Perth Technical College.

His portrait of the art dealer and benefactor Claude Hotchin was an entry in the 1957 Archibald Prize.

From 1964, he held exhibitions in many major galleries in Perth (commencing with the Skinner Gallery) and Sydney. His paintings are avidly sought by collectors. His portrait of Sir James Alexander Forrest is held in the National Portrait Gallery in Canberra.

Boissevain was interviewed by Hazel de Berg in 1965 about his career and early life. The recording can be found at the National Library of Australia.

His first wife Rhoda Elsie Boissevain (1918–1999), was also a fine portrait painter and runner-up in the Rubinstein Prize for portraiture 1960. She also taught at Perth Technical College in the 1960s. The National Library of Australia holds her portrait of Katharine Susannah Prichard, completed ca. 1955. He had one daughter Daisy Boissevain. He died on 24 July 2023, hours after his 96th birthday.

== Exhibitions ==
- 1950 - Newspaper House.

== Awards ==
- Rubinstein Prize for portraiture 1956
- Claude Hotchin Art Prize, 1959
- Perth Prize for Drawing International, Perth, Western Australia, 1971
- He was awarded an Order of the British Empire (OBE) in 1978 for his services to the advancement of art.

== Bibliography ==
- Boissevain, William; Fry, Gavin (1998), William Boissevain : a passion for colour, Beagle Press, ISBN 978-0-947349-22-6
- Boissevain, William; Fry, Gavin (1998), William Boissevain : a passion for colour (2nd ed.), Beagle Press (published 2001), ISBN 978-0-947349-22-6
- Addenbrooke, Maureen (illustrations by Wim Boissevain) Killing Cats and Karma Artlook Books Perth, W.A. 1983 ISBN 0-86445-042-7

== Sources ==
McCulloch, Alan Encyclopedia of Australian Art Hutchinson of London 1968
