= Blandford Fletcher =

British painter (1858–1936)

William Teulon Blandford Fletcher
- Born: 8 November 1858; London, England
- Died: 27 June 1936 (aged 77); Abingdon-on-Thames, Berkshire, England
- Education: South Kensington School of Art and Academie Royale
- Known for: Painter
- Movement: Newlyn School
- Spouse: Norah Beatrice Emmeline Harris

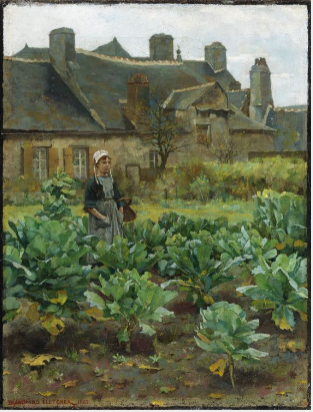
The Kitchen Garden in November, 1883

William Teulon Blandford Fletcher (known as Blandford Fletcher) (8 November 1858 – 27 June 1936) was a British artist and an early member of the influential Newlyn School of painters.

== Early life ==
Fletcher was born in London in 1858 to William Fletcher, a linen draper and upholsterer, and his wife Eliza (née Bartholomew). Against his father's wishes, Fletcher studied art at the South Kensington School of Art from the age of 16 to 20, winning the Silver Medal and the Queen's Prize. During that time, he visited Brittany, where he became acquainted with Stanhope Forbes.

== Career ==
Fletcher joined the life class at Charles Verlat's Academie Royale in Antwerp, where he became friends with Frank Bramley, Fred Hall and Walter Osborne. He spent time painting at Pont-Aven and Dinan in France, during which time he became friends with Frederick Millard and met Jules Bastien-Lepage. In the 1884 Royal Academy shows he exhibited four paintings executed at Pont-Aven and Quimperlé, although he did not become a Royal Academician.

He was an early member of the Newlyn School in 1885, where he worked on a single large canvas, Dame Grigson's Academy. Fletcher lived in lodgings in Henry & Elizabeth Maddern's Belle Vue House with Forbes and Albert Chevallier Tayler. The same year he permanently left the artists' colony. He travelled, sometimes with Osborne, and continued to travel and worked as a wandering artist until settling in Dorking in 1904 and then Abingdon-on-Thames in 1915.

== Works ==
=== Evicted ===
Fletcher's most famous work is Evicted (painted in Steventon in 1887), which was the first painting acquired by the Queensland Art Gallery in 1896. It was bought for a sum reported variously to be 300, 400 or 450 guineas. Under Petticoat Government (1891) was initially also acquired by QAG in 1896 on a loan arrangement. In 1942 Evicted inspired the 11-year-old Betty Churcher to decide to be an artist. A year before her death, Archer described her reaction to the painting:

"Looking at those boots and the wonder of those autumn leaves on the road brought it all back in a rush. I was no longer worried about the illustrative pathos of the subject; I fell in love again with the magic of paint, with the wonder that paint could transform a stretch of bare canvas into a whole new world for a little girl."

In 1900, 1907, 1909 and 1938 it was one of a number of paintings sent on tours of Queensland country towns.

In 1907 Evicted was described as "a masterpiece of painting", and in 1932 as "that beautiful and ever popular picture". but by 1949 tastes had changed and it was one of six paintings to be removed from display and placed into storage, with the then director, Robert Campbell, declaring that it was only popular "because it had a sentimental touch". Campbell called for it to be "discarded", and declared that "[it] is not Art", further stating that it was a mere "illustration". John Cooper, director of the Moreton Galleries in Brisbane, stated that it should be auctioned off, notwithstanding that it was QAG's most popular picture. It formed part of an exhibition of request paintings at QAG in 1954. It is typical of his painting style. It is not currently (2022) on display.

=== Other works ===
A partial list of his other works includes:

- The Kitchen Garden in November, 1883, National Gallery of Ireland
- The Farm Garden, 1888, Ashmolean Museum, Oxford
- The Widow's Mite, 1890, Worcester City Art Gallery & Museum
- Under Petticoat Government, 1891, Ferens Art Gallery
- The Old Mill, Surrey, 1893, Leeds Art Gallery
- Sacrament Sunday, 1897, Nottingham City Museum & Gallery
- Bosham Harbour at Low Tide, 1901, Penlee House
- The Anthem, 1913, Colchester and Ipswich Museums Service

== Exhibitions ==
- Maas Gallery, London, 1975.
- "Father and Daughter: Blandford Fletcher, painter, Rosamund Fletcher, sculptor", Ashmolean Museum, Oxford, 1979.

== Publications ==
- Hood, Nancy, William Teulon Blandford Fletcher, 1858-1936, (Rosamund Fletcher: 1986).

== Personal life ==
Engaged since 1888, Fletcher married Norah Beatrice Emmeline Harris (1863-1960) in 1894. They had two daughters, one of whom was the sculptor Rosamund Fletcher.

He died in 1936, aged 77, in Abingdon. Fletcher was a Catholic convert.
