= Rosamund Fletcher =

English sculptor

- Born: Rosamund Mary Beatrice Fletcher; 5 August 1908; Dorking, Surrey, England
- Died: 18 February 1993 (aged 84); Braintree, Essex
- Known for: Sculpture
- Notable work: The End of the Covert (1948)

Olympic medal record

Art competitions

Representing Great Britain
| Bronze medal – third place | 1948 London | Reliefs |

Rosamund Mary Beatrice Fletcher (5 August 1908 — 18 February 1993) was an English sculptor. Her works were shown over twenty times at the Royal Academy Summer Exhibition from 1938 to 1965. In 1957, she became a Fellow of the Royal Society of British Sculptors and remained a Fellow until her death in 1993. Her sculpture The End of the Covert won a bronze medal in the art competitions at the 1948 Summer Olympics.

== Early life and education ==
Fletcher was born on 5 August 1908 in Dorking, England, the daughter of Blandford and Norah Fletcher. Her father, who was a painter, convinced her not to take up art during her childhood. Fletcher went to the Ruskin School of Drawing and Fine Art from 1935 to 1937 and graduated from the Slade School of Fine Art in 1939. She also attended programs about casting in London and Oxford.

== Career ==
After graduating, Fletcher first showcased her artwork at the Royal Academy Summer Exhibition in London in 1938. From 1938 to 1965, over thirty of her sculptures were shown at the Summer Exhibition. During this time period, Fletcher also participated at a children's exhibition held by the Royal Society of British Sculptors in 1947. Outside of England, Fletcher's artwork was shown in a 1950 Royal Scottish Academy exhibition and a 1951 Royal Glasgow Institute of the Fine Arts event.

For her individual works, Fletcher created a 15–piece artwork on the Stations of the Cross. She also made statues of Saints Edward the Confessor and Edmund Campion. In international exhibitions, Fletcher won a bronze medal at the 1948 Summer Olympics for her sculpture The End of the Covert, in the reliefs event. Her sculptures were held in various schools and religious places throughout England while also appearing in Massachusetts at the Samuel Slater Memorial.

== Honours and death ==
In 1940, Fletcher was awarded the Lady Feodora Gleichen Fund. In 1957, she became a Fellow of the Royal Society of British Sculptors and held this position until her death in 1993. She had previously joined the Royal Society in 1945 as a member before her fellowship. On 18 February 1993, Fletcher died in Braintree, Essex.
