= Ella Fry =

Australian artist (1916–1997)

Ella Fry (née Robinson) (1916–1997) was an artist, musician, and chairperson of the Western Australian Art Gallery, in Perth, Western Australia from 1976 to 1986.

She was born in Brisbane in 1916 and educated at Brisbane Girls Grammar School. She worked as an apprentice with a commercial art firm in 1934.

== Sydney ==
She studied art at East Sydney Technical College from 1936 to 1939, and music at Sydney Conservatorium of Music in 1936-1940.

In 1940, she returned to Brisbane, where she worked as an artist and a pianist (recitals with the ABC and concert performances). From 1943 she taught music and art at the Tamworth Church of England Girls' School.

== Perth ==
In 1945, she married Melville Leonard Fry. Two years later they moved to Perth where her dual career continued.

In the early 1950s, she and her husband lived in Dalkeith, but they moved to Boya in the hills east of Perth in later years. In August 1951 her work was featured in an exhibition at the Claude Hotchin Galleries in Perth, and she had a one-woman exhibition at the Skinner Galleries, Perth, in 1960.

She was first appointed to the Board of the Art Gallery of Western Australia in 1956 Then she became vice-chairperson in 1970, then chairperson in 1976. In 1982 she was appointed a CBE.

In 1984, her book Gallery Images was published

In 1994, Gomboc Gallery of 50 James Rd, Middle Swan, Western Australia had an exhibition of her work

Her art work is represented in the National Gallery of Australia, Queensland Art Gallery, the Art Gallery of Western Australia, the Lawrence Wilson Art Gallery of UWA, as well as numerous university, regional and private collections.

She died in 1997.

== Awards ==
In 1982, she was awarded a CBE for services to the arts.
