= Ian Templeman =

Australian arts administrator, publisher, poet and painter

Ian Neil Templeman (10 October 1938 – 3 November 2015) was an Australian poet, artist and arts administrator.

== History ==
Templeman was born in Kensington, a suburb of Perth, Western Australia, the only child of (Merle) Daphne Templeman, née Hutchison, and Ronald Strachan Templeman (born 23 March 1908) of 21 Arlington Avenue. South Perth, who married on 13 April 1931.

He was an active member of the Young Australia League, taking a prominent part in their stage performances of the early 1950s. He was already an established painter and arts teacher when he began studying for an arts degree at the University of Western Australia, specialising in English literature and poetry. He was an accomplished athlete, who competed successfully at State level.

He was appointed National Executive Officer of the Australian Society for Education through the Arts

He served as assistant to the director of the Festival of Perth.

In 1973 he was appointed director of the newly-founded Fremantle Arts Centre, overseeing a program of consolidation and expansion, establishing the Fremantle Arts Centre Press in 1975.

In 1990 he moved to Canberra to take up an assistant Director-General position with the National Library of Australia. One of his projects was to establish the National Portrait Gallery.

During this time he founded Molonglo Press as a private concern, and in 1998 left the Library to direct its operation. The following year he took on the role of Director of Publications of the Research School of Pacific and Asian Studies at the Australian National University, Canberra.

== Other interests ==
Templeman was involved in:

- Western Australian Literary Fund
- Australia Council
- National Library of Australia
- Public Lending Rights Committee
- Chair of the ACT Cultural Council in 2002
- Public Art Advisory Panel to the Chief Minister of the ACT 2006–2011

He continued to write poetry for newspapers and literary magazines, also in collected editions; also essays and memoirs

== Recognition ==
- Appointed a Member of the Order of Australia in 1989
- Elected Honorary Fellow of the Australian Academy of the Humanities in 2004
- Awarded honorary DLitt by the University of Western Australia in 2007

Novelist Sara Dowse said of him "He was one of life's great enthusiasts. He gave so much."

== Publications ==
- Poems (1979)
- These Glimpsed Interiors (1997)
- An Incomplete Memoir (2001)

== Personal ==
Templeman married the artist Romola Clifton, and had a hand in publishing some of her work as greeting cards. They had two sons: Paul and Nicholas, and a daughter Amelia. He died aged 77, four years after being diagnosed with terminal cancer.

No relationship with the Western Australian politician David Alan Templeman (born 21 November 1965) has been found.
