= Romola Clifton =

Australian artist

Romola Clifton (born 30 November 1935) is an Australian artist who won the Claude Hotchin Art Prize for watercolor in 1956 and the Helena Rubinstein Portrait Prize in 1960.

== Early life and education ==
Romola Clifton was born on 30 November 1935 in Perth, Western Australia, the daughter of Nancy Millicent Clifton, née Hughes (1911–1989) and Marshall Waller Gervase Clifton (1903–1975), a well-known architect and artist.

She grew up in the Perth suburb of Mosman Park and attended St Hilda's School.

She studied at the Slade School of Art from 1953 to 1955 after which she studied at the University of Western Australia with the aim of becoming a medical artist.

== Career ==
In 1951 Clifton won the Claude Hotchin Jubilee junior art prize, and in the Youth Art Exhibition following year her painting of the Fremantle Harbour was accepted for the International Junior Red Cross exhibition in Toronto, Canada.

In 1953 two of her watercolours were accepted for an exhibition called "Young Artists of the Commonwealth", at which Rolf Harris was also represented.

She won the Claude Hotchin Art Prize for watercolour in 1956, and had her first solo exhibition at the Skinner Galleries in 1959.

In 1978 Clifton painted a portrait of Paul Hasluck, which is held in the Historic Memorials Collection at Parliament House, Canberra.

She was at one stage a director and art consultant to Molonglo Press, a private concern founded by Ian Templeman.

== Personal life ==
Clifton married fellow-artist Ross Morrow and lived in Sydney. They divorced and she married again, to poet and arts administrator Ian Templeman and moved to Canberra, where he had a position with the National Library of Australia.

She was a close friend and portraitist of Canberra artist Jan Brown (1922–2022).

Clifton's papers are held in the National Library of Australia.
