= James Alexander Forrest =

Australian lawyer, businessman and philanthropist

James Alexander Forrest upon receiving an honorary Doctor of Laws degree, 1979.

Sir James Alexander Forrest (10 March 1905 in Kerang, Victoria – 26 September 1990 in Malvern, Victoria) was an Australian lawyer, businessman and philanthropist.

== Biography ==
=== Family ===
James Alexander Forrest was the third of five children of Scottish-born parents John Forrest and Mary Forrest, née Gray.

He married Mary Christina Armit (1913–1995), the granddaughter of Sir Edward Fancourt Mitchell, on 9 December 1939 (or 1935). They had three children: Alexander James "Alex" Forrest (1941–), an engineer; William John "Bill" Forrest (1944-), a solicitor; and Hugh David Forrest, an agricultural scientist.

=== Education ===
Forrest was educated at Caulfield Grammar School in Melbourne; he attended there from 1920 to 1922.

In 1925, he started an articled clerk's course at the University of Melbourne; and, although this course of study did not lead to a law degree, it qualified the student as both a barrister and solicitor in Victoria. He was admitted to the Victorian Bar on 3 March 1930. His admission was moved by both Robert Menzies and Wilfred Fullagar, and presided over by William Irvine, then the Chief Justice of the Supreme Court of Victoria.

=== Career ===
Forrest became a prominent lawyer, specializing in corporate law. He was a partner at the firm of Hedderwicks Fookes & Alston, which later merged to become Allens Arthur Robinson. His business grew thanks to his close ties with the Grimwade family, and he was eventually named a director of the Felton Grimwalde & Duerdins Ltd family holding.

Jim Forrest was enlisted in the Royal Australian Air Force (RAAF) in June 1942, and discharged in September 1943. He served as a Flight Lieutenant in RAAF Intelligence during his enlistment, and then worked for the Department of Aircraft Production.

Shortly after the war Forrest took up several board directorships of Australian companies :

- 1945-1977: Board member of the Australian Mutual Provident Society
- 1953-1977: Chairman of Australian Consolidated Industries
- 1959-1978: Chairman of the National Bank of Australasia
- 1959-1969: Director of the Drug Houses of Australia Ltd
- 1961-1977: Director of the AMP Society
- 1970-1972: Director of the Western Mining Corporation
- 1971-1980: Chairman of Chase-NBA Group Ltd
- 1970-1978: Chairman of Alcoa Australia

From 1961 to 1971, he was a foundation member of the Council of Monash University. He was a board member of numerous charitable and educational bodies, including the Royal Children's Hospital, Scotch College, Scouts Australia, and an original member of the Victoria Law Foundation.

== Recognition ==
- 1967: Knight Bachelor for "services to the community".
- 1977-1990 fellow of the Australian Academy of Science, after becoming the fourth person inducted into the Fellowship by Special Election.
- 1979: Honorary Doctor of Laws (LL.D.) degree by Monash University for service to the law, commerce, and Monash itself.

A portrait of Forrest, painted by William Boissevain, and donated by Alcoa, now hangs in the National Portrait Gallery at the Old Parliament House.

In 1977, The Australian Financial Review called him « one of the most dominant men among Australian company directors for a quarter of a century ».

== See also ==
- List of Caulfield Grammar School people
