= New Norcia Hotel =

Historic building in New Norcia, Australia

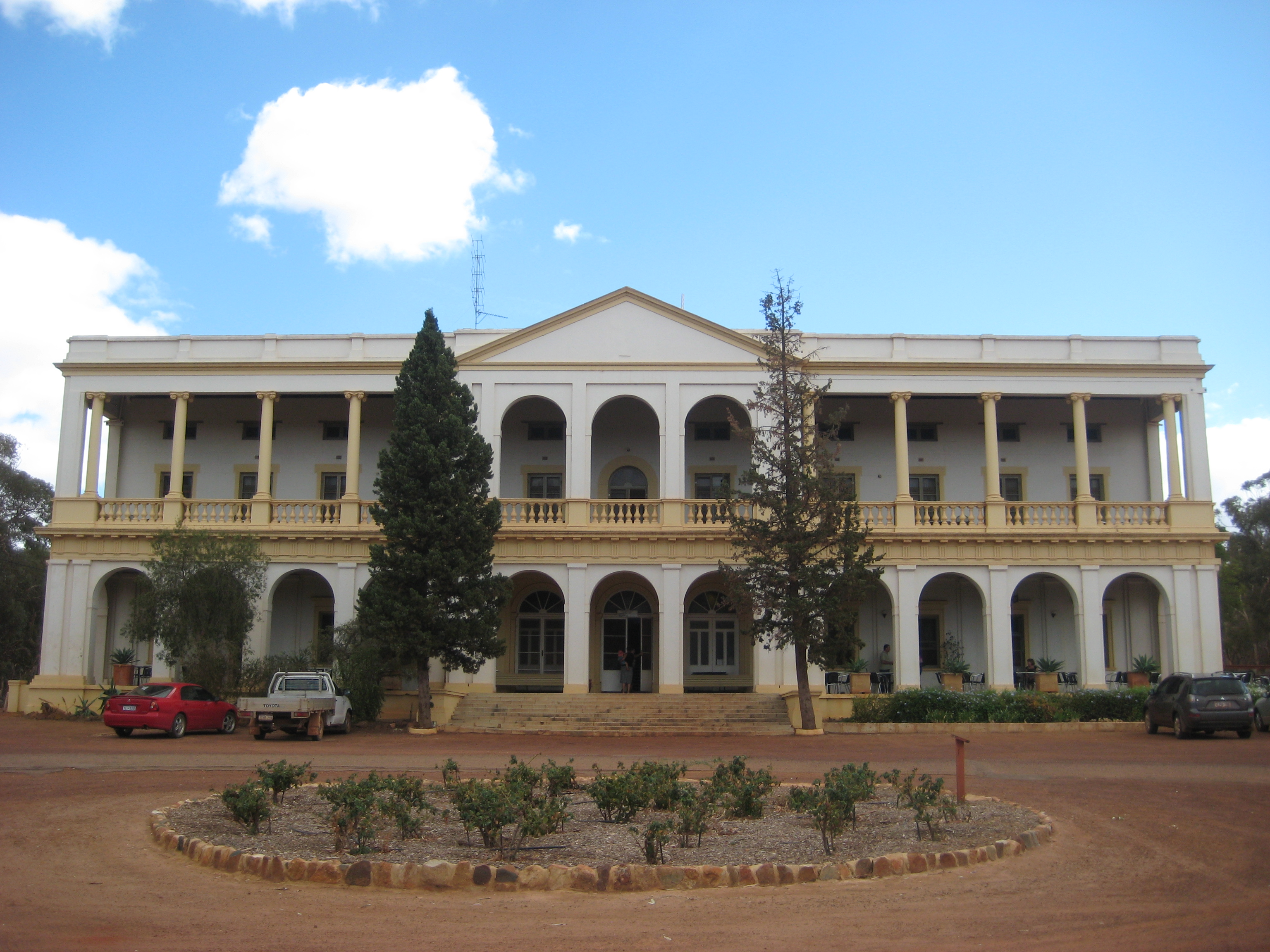
New Norcia Hotel in 2011

The New Norcia Hotel is a historic building in New Norcia, in Western Australia's Wheatbelt region. Part of the Benedictine Monastery Precinct, it opened in 1927 as a hostel for travellers and families of boarders at the New Norcia colleges, but later opened to the public. It closed in January 2020.

New Norcia, Australia's only monastic town, was founded by Spanish Benedictine monks in 1847. Since the early 20th century, there have been boarding colleges associated with the monastery in New Norcia – St Gertrude's opened in 1908 for girls, and St Ildephonsus' opened in 1913 for boys. By 1926 the existing hostels were barely able to cope with the crowds of visitors coming for Easter reunions.

Construction of a new, more elaborate, hostel began in 1926, and it opened in 1927, along with a modern motor garage. The two-storey structure was built in a neo-classical architectural style from stone. A large stairway, several metres wide, leads to a passageway, with guest rooms on both sides. The windows overlook several hectares of the monastery's farm, while from a colonnaded balcony there are views of St Gertrude's College, St Joseph's Orphanage, and the public chapel. The verandah is tiled in a traditional Spanish style.

By 1952 the hostel had electricity, but the supply was turned off at 9 pm, with candles provided to guests. In 1955 the hostel was turned into the New Norcia Hotel, with fifteen rooms, as well as a bar and a restaurant. The monks were the first religious organisation in Australia to have a hotel licence.

The tourist experience at New Norcia was promoted since the 1980s as a niche-interest, promoting cultural traditions, and historical and spiritual experiences, with the active use of historic buildings a way to maintain them. There were few changes evident at the hotel by the 1990s.

The hotel received a permanent entry on the Register of the National Estate on 21 October 1980, and was classified by the National Trust on 3 November 1991. Its condition is described as "good".

In the first week of January 2020, the monks made a sudden announcement that the hotel was closing, as it was "not part of [their] strategic plan". A letter sent to local residents stated:

We regret to inform you that after long consideration, the Board of the Benedictine Community has reached a decision to permanently close the New Norcia Hotel. As a Community we understand the New Norcia Hotel has been of significance to generations of locals and the decision to close it has not been taken lightly.

— Father John Herbert

The Shire of Victoria Plains' president Pauline Bantock said the closure would have a significant impact on the local community, due to the hotel's popularity with tourists, and because it was the only place within 50 kilometres (31 mi) for meals and social contact.
