= May Marsden =

Australian artist and educationist

- Born: 6 May 1876; Churchstoke, Wales
- Died: 12 July 1968 (aged 92); Artarmon, Sydney, Australia
- Education: Derby Central School of Art
- Occupation: art lecturer
- Known for: influence on art in Australia

May Marsden (6 May 1876 – 12 July 1968) was an Australian artist and educationist who was born in Wales. She lectured at the Sydney Teachers' College and she is credited with changing the way art was taught to secondary students. She encouraged that they should be innovative and more conservative approaches were discouraged.

== Life ==
Marsden was born in Churchstoke in what was then Monmouthshire which is just in Wales. She began her artistic training at Wirksworth, under Fred Simmonds, and continued it in the Derby Central School of Art. She then qualified as a teacher at Kensington's Royal College of Art. She was teaching girls in Liverpool and she exhibited her paintings there. She also showed then in Leicester and Derby.

In 1913 she and her parents emigrated to Australia. She was employed at the new Sydney Teachers' College by the Scottish born academic Alexander Mackie as an art lecturer. The Australian Watercolour Institute was formed and their first exhibition was in 1924 and she exhibited with them. Some of her drawings from 1929 are in the New South Wales Art Gallery and the watercolour "Magnolias".

She was an inspiring teacher believing that artists need to be left alone. She gained a name for teaching children art by not teaching them. She filled the corridors of Sydney Teachers' College with copies of paintings by the great masters and prints of contemporary work including that of Eleonore Lange. She enjoyed the support of Mackie in her approach although some thought her eccentric. She ran a sketching club and she would persuade her students to gather around a piece of art in the corridor where she would inform and entertain them. One of her earliest students was Portia Mary Bennett and a later student was the surrealist James Gleeson. She persuaded him to switch from poetry to art to explore his hatred of fascism as the war came to Australia.

Marsden is credited with changing the way that art was taught to secondary students. Historically there had been a very conservative approach but Marsden inspired teachers to encourage innovation in their students. She was employed by the Sydney Teachers' College until 1941. Marsden died in 1968 in her home in the Sydney suburb of Artarmon.
