= Lionel Jago =

Australian artist

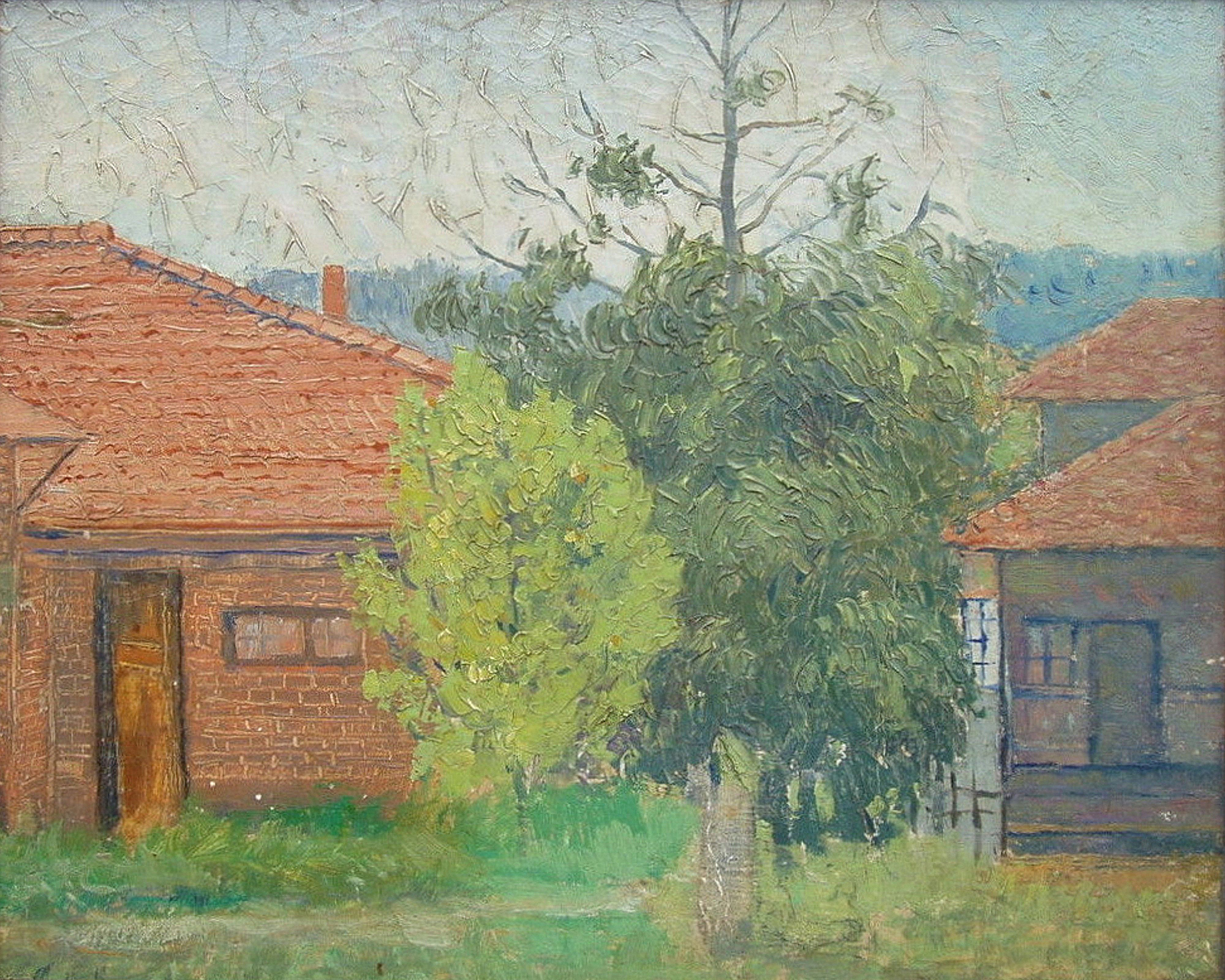
Lionel Jago, Cottages at Dover Heights

Lionel Hornibrook Jago (1882–1953) was an Australian artist active between 1910 and 1950.

== Early life and education ==
Jago was born in South Australia in 1882.

He studied at Davis Studio, Melbourne and at Julian Ashton Art School in Sydney.

He was also an accomplished violinist.

== Adult life and career ==
He moved to Perth in the early 1900s, marrying Christina McTavish in 1912, and worked with the State public service until his retirement in 1945.

Jago exhibited in the inaugural Perth Society of Artists exhibition in 1933. Jago moved to Sydney in the late 1940s, living in Woollahra, and exhibited with the Royal Art Society.

He died in 1953.

== Recognition ==
After moving to Sydney, Jago was a finalist in the prestigious Sir John Sulman Prize (Art Gallery of New South Wales) in 1948 for Bathers, beaten by Sali Herman’s The Drovers, and in 1950 for Merry-go-Rounds, beaten by Harold Greenhill’s Summer Holiday. He was also a finalist for the 1950 Wynne Prize with Promenade – Watson’s Bay, beaten by Lloyd Rees’ The Harbour from McMahon's Point.

In 2009 the Perth City Council held an exhibition, Modern Visions of the City of Perth, which featured his painting East Perth, 1936 Oil on Canvas 25.0 x 36.5, from the Janet Holmes à Court Collection.

His work is also listed in:

- McCulloch, Alan McCulloch, Susan McCulloch, Emily McCulloch-Childs The New McCulloch's Encyclopedia of Australian Art 4th Edition, Aus Art Melbourne & The Miegunyah Press, 2006. Page 548; and
- Australian Prints + Printmaking, a database listing printmaking artists from Australia, New Zealand and the Pacific region based on the print collection of the National Gallery of Australia.
