= New Norcia, Western Australia =

New Norcia
- Town
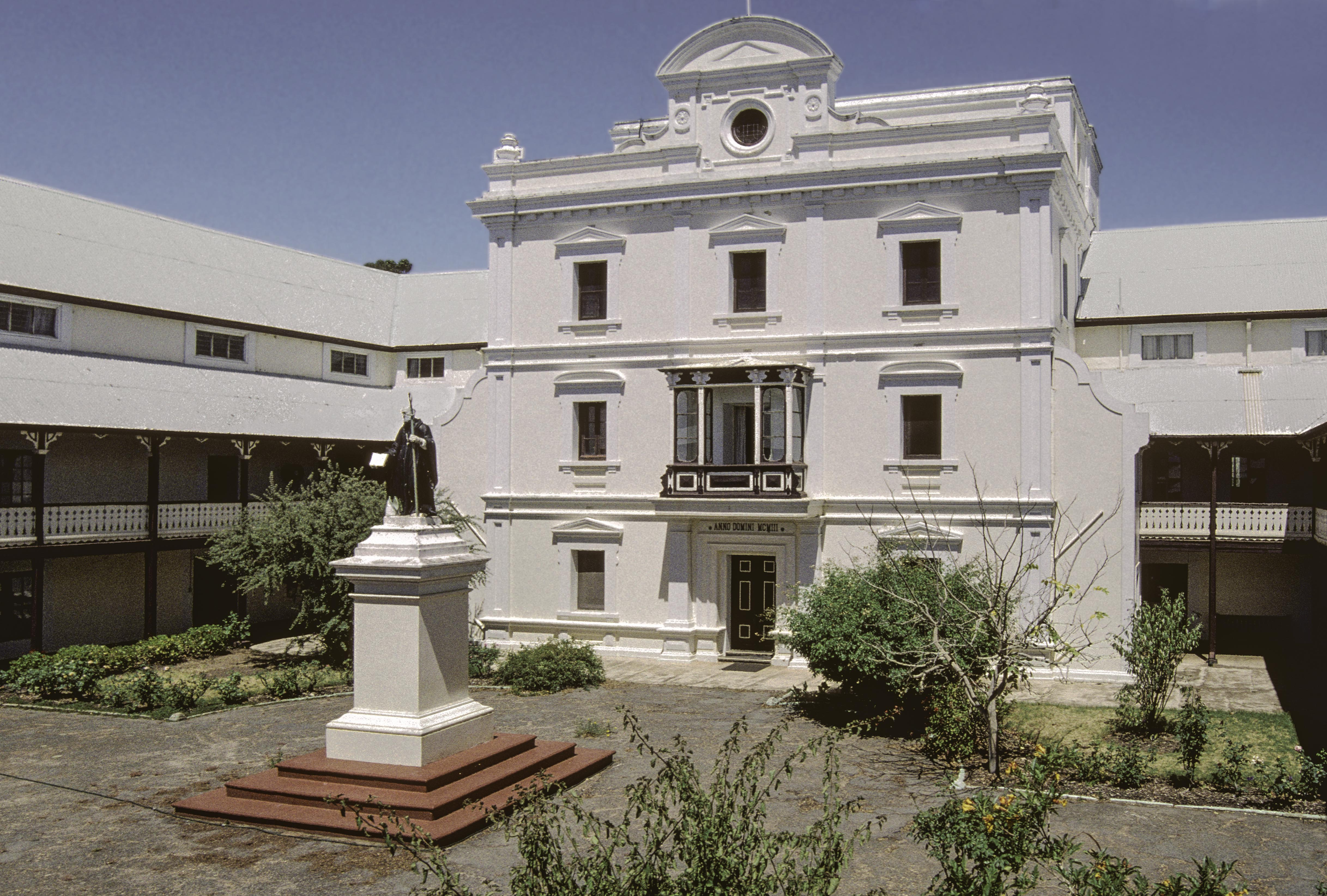
- New Norcia Benedictine monastery

- Interactive map of New Norcia
- Coordinates: 30°57′10.8″S 116°11′27.6″E
- Country: Australia
- State: Western Australia
- LGA: Shire of Victoria Plains
- Location: 132 km (82 mi) N of Perth; 56 km (35 mi) SE of Moora
- Established: 1847

Government
  - State electorate: Central Wheatbelt
  - Federal division: Durack

Area
  - Total: 146.6 km^{2} (56.6 sq mi)

Population
  - Total: 57 (SAL 2021)
- Postcode: 6509

New Norcia (/ˈnɔːrsiə/ NOR-see-ə) is a town in Western Australia, 132 kilometres (82 mi) north of Perth, near the Great Northern Highway. It is situated next to the banks of the Moore River, in the Shire of Victoria Plains. New Norcia is the only monastic town in Australia, with its Benedictine abbey founded in 1848. The monks later founded a mission and schools for Aboriginal children. A series of Catholic colleges were created, with the school that became St Benedict's College in 1965 later gaining notoriety for being the site of sexual abuse that took place in the late 1960s and 1970s.

The town has many heritage sites and places of interest. New Norcia Station, a ground station for the European Space Agency is located 8 kilometres (5 mi) south of the town. Since a road bypass was complete in 2017, heavy traffic bypasses the town.

== History ==
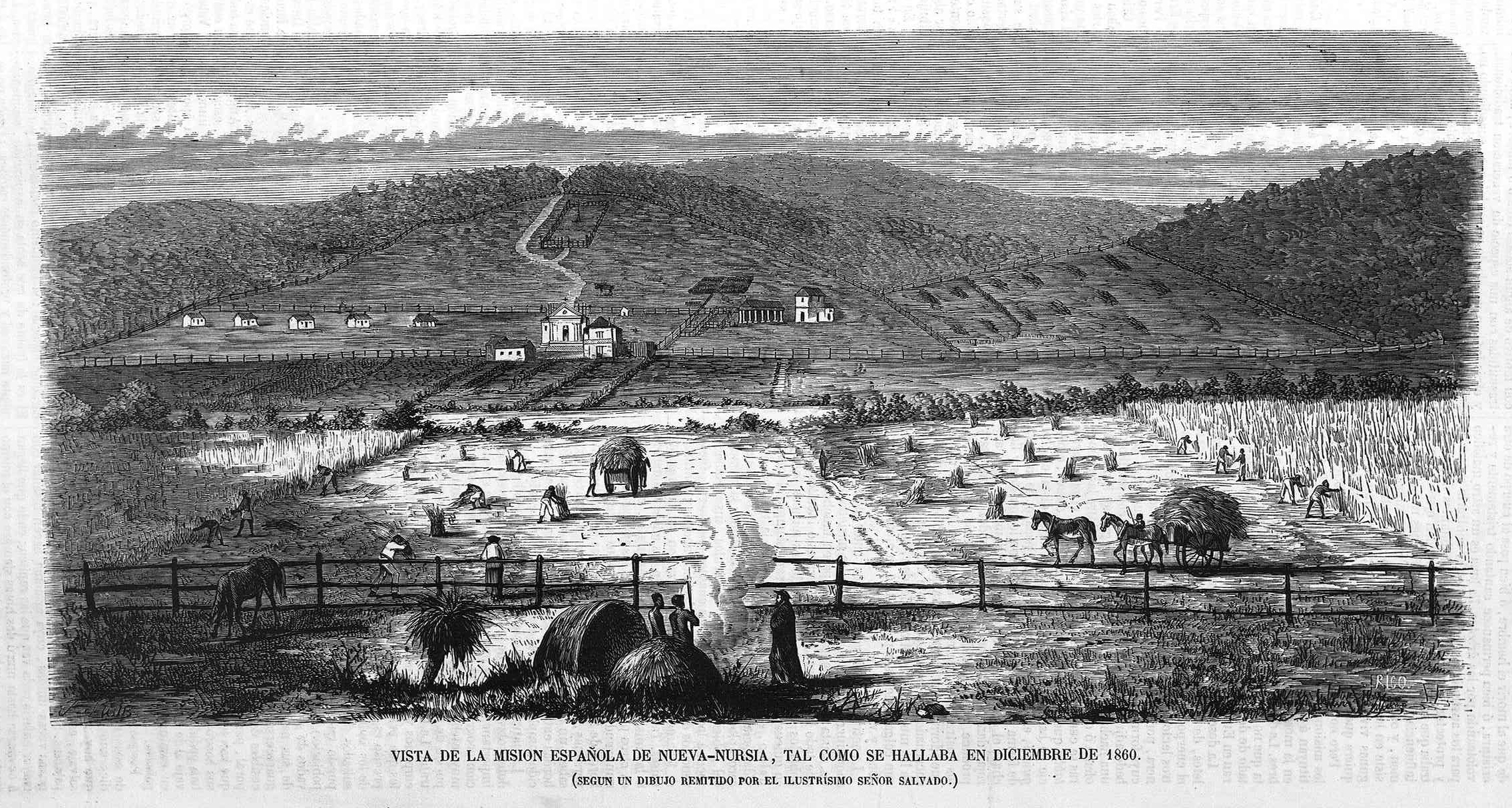
New Norcia in 1860

On 1 March 1846, a Benedictine mission to the local Yued Aboriginal people was started about 8 kilometres (5 mi) to the north, led by Spanish Benedictine monks Giuseppe Serra and Rosendo Salvado. Within a year the mission was moved to where the town is today, and on 1 March 1847 the foundation stone of the monastery was laid.

The place was named New Norcia after Norcia in Italy, the birthplace of St Benedict, home to the Monastery of Saint Benedict. Unlike the Italian town, which is pronounced [ˈnɔrtʃa] (approximately /ˈnɔːrtʃə/ NOR-chə), New Norcia is pronounced /ˈnɔːrsiə/ NOR-see-ə.

A significant diversion of the Great Northern Highway completed in 2017, known as the New Norcia Bypass, diverts heavy traffic away from the buildings and town.

=== Abbey history ===
The abbey was founded by two Spanish Benedictine monks, Giuseppe Serra and Rosendo Salvado on 1 March 1847. After two years spent among the local Aboriginal people, Serra and Salvado came to the conclusion that they could be more easily converted by establishing a mission rather than following them on their journeys. Salvado was appointed the first abbot of New Norcia on 12 March 1867.

In 1886, 5,300 hectares (13,000 acres) of land was leased to Salvado, in order to fulfil his aim of encouraging local Aboriginal people to settle there, become farmers, and eventually own the land – on which they had lived and for which they had cared for over 40 millennia). However, after Salvado's death, the new abbot, Fulgentius Torres, turned the focus of the mission away from Aboriginal children, and was more concerned with educating the children of Catholic settlers. In 1949, the Benedictines applied to the government to purchase the land, which the government eventually permitted, despite other competing interests, in order to honour the 1886 agreement with the monks. However, the agreement did not include any ongoing obligation on the part of the Benedictines to ensure that Aboriginal people could use and benefit from the land.

Abbots at the monastery include:

- 12 March 1867 – 29 December 1900: Rosendo Salvado – died as abbot, aged 86 years
- 1902 – 6 October 1914: Fulgentius Torres – died as abbot, aged 53 years
- 1915–1951: Anselm Catalán – resigned died 29 July 1959, aged 80 years
- 1951–1971: Gregory Gómez – resigned, died 31 May 1995, aged 91 years
- 31 March 1974 – 15 June 1980: Bernard Rooney – resigned
- 1983–1997: (Placid Spearritt) – appointed apostolic administrator of the community
- 29 January 1997 – 4 October 2008: Placid Spearritt – died as abbot, aged 75 years
- 23 January 2009 – present: John Herbert

=== New Norcia Mission ===
There were also two institutions for Aboriginal children: St Mary's (for boys) and St Joseph's (for girls), collectively known as New Norcia Mission. When it was operating the New Norcia Misson was a part of the Stolen Generations with Indigenous children being sent to the mission after being forcibly removed from their families.

The children were taught mainly practical skills, and after leaving school they often worked at the Mission. The New Norcia Mission was scheduled under the Industrial Schools Act 1874, meaning that the abbot had "complete control" over the children living there. Both schools closed in 1974.

St Mary's Mission, also known as St Mary's College, was founded in 1848 as a boarding school for Aboriginal boys. Some boys, including wards of state in the 1960s, were place there by the state government. In his 2021 autobiographical book God, the Devil and Me, Alf Taylor (1945–2023) recounts the horrific verbal and physical abuse meted out to Aboriginal boys living in the mission by the brothers and nuns during the 1950s and 1960s. The book was short-listed for the 2022 New South Wales Premier's Literary Awards, Indigenous Writers' Prize.

St Joseph's Native School and Orphanage was founded in 1861 by the monks. Benedictine Missionary Sisters sent from Spain took over in 1904 and ran it until its closure in 1974. Aboriginal girls and young women lived and attended school there, sometimes sent by their families, and sometimes placed there as government policy if they were children of single mothers. This policy was a part of the Stolen Generations. The school and orphanage were rebuilt in 1909. There were stories of physical and emotional abuse of the girls at St Joseph's.

The monks Latinised the children's Aboriginal names, making it hard to trace who they were later. From the time of Abbot Fulgentius Torres onwards, the focus changed and tensions arose in how the "orphanages" were being run. Adults were prevented from visiting their children, and in 1907 an incident occurred in which 32 Aboriginal fathers were arrested by police when they tried to storm the mission to see their children.

In 2001 there was a reunion of former residents of New Norcia Mission.

=== Post and Telegraph Office ===
A post office was opened as Victoria Plains in April 1857. A telegraph line was erected through to Victoria Plains in 1873 and the position of postmistress was created. Mary Ellen Cuper was appointed to that position in January 1874. The post and telegraph offices were combined on 4 March 1874, on the same day that the name of the offices was changed to New Norcia. Cuper was appointed as the first post and telegraph mistress of New Norcia – thus becoming the first Aboriginal person to be appointed to such a position in any of the Australian colonies. Her health started to deteriorate in the last part of 1875 due to tuberculosis so she trained Sarah Ninak – another Aboriginal woman - in all of the required skills. Ninak took increasing responsibility for the duties, and by 1876 was acting in charge of the office. Cuper died in January 1877.

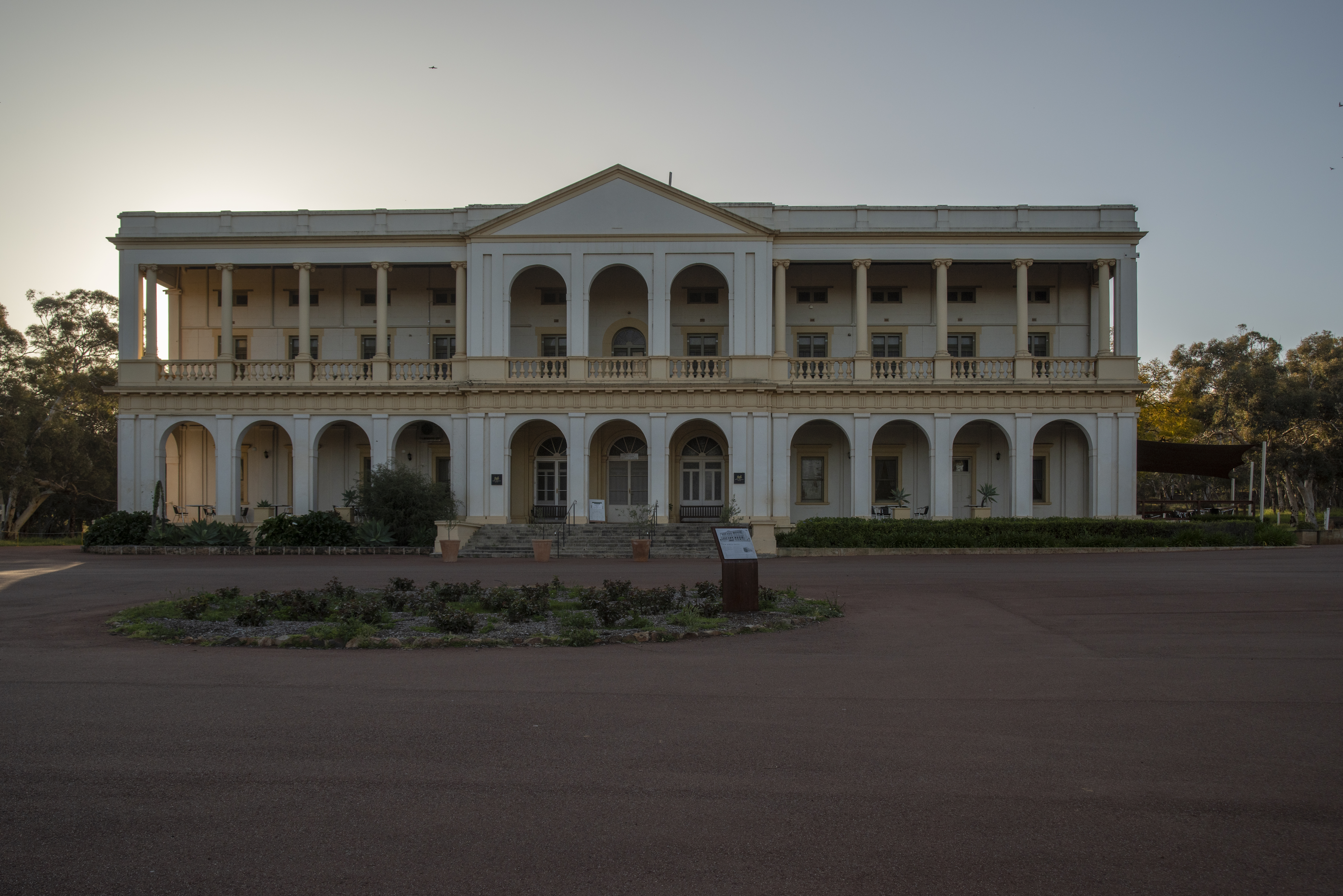
New Norcia Hotel

=== New Norcia Hotel ===
Originally known as the New Norcia Hostel, showcasing neo-classical architecture, the multifaceted New Norcia Hotel was opened in 1927 and was used for the parents of boarders at the town's colleges. It later opened to the public, and by the late 20th century, the New Norcia Hotel functioned as a pub. It closed in January 2020.

=== Land sale ===
In early 2021, Andrew Forrest's company, Tattarang, via its subsidiary Harvest Road, acquired the land that the government had sold to the monks in 1949, with over A$17 million changing hands for it this time. The new owners said that they were planning to meet with the traditional owners of the land, the Yued people, and discuss opportunities for training and employment.

== Colleges ==
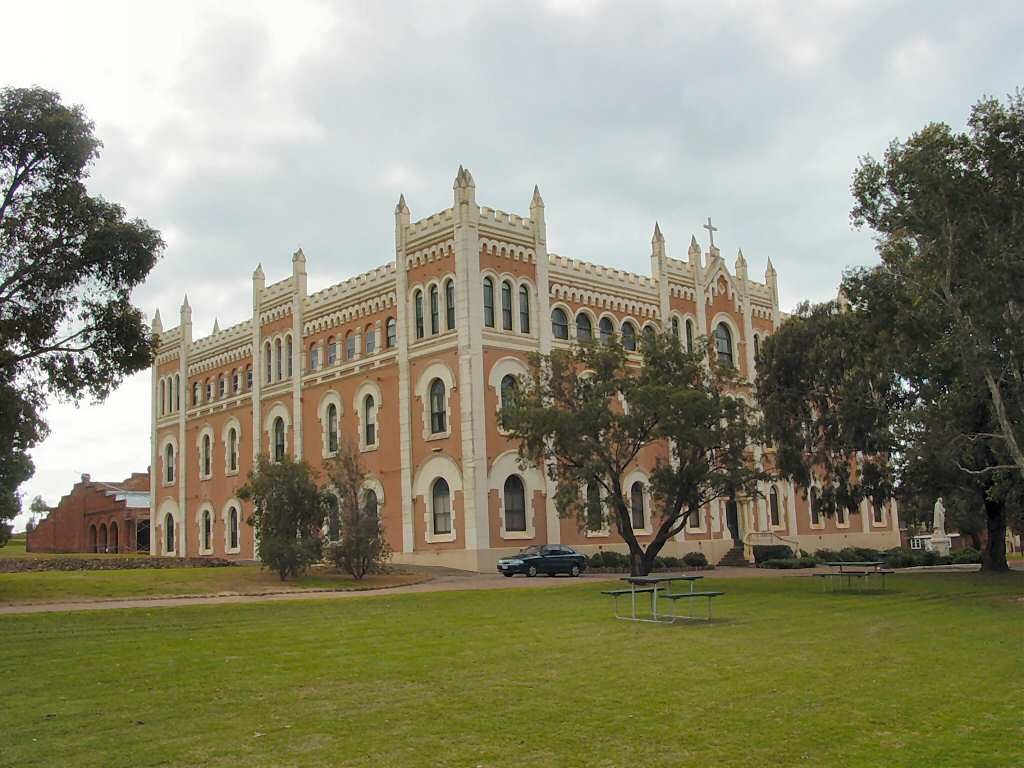
St Ildephonsus' Boys' School

There has been a number of colleges situated in the town associated with the monastery, situated on the west side of the current main road alignment which passes through the town.

St Gertrude's College was completed in 1908.

St Ildephonsus' College was opened in 1913. It operated until 1964 as St Ildephonsus' under the Marist Brothers order. From 1965 onwards, it was run by the Benedictines as St Benedict's College.

In 1972, St Benedict's and St Gertrude's become co-educational, with student from both colleges sharing classes, and in 1974 the two became known jointly as Salvado College. Each building was still referred to individually as St Benedict's and St Gertrude's. In 1986 Salvado College became New Norcia Catholic College, which closed at the end of 1991.

The colleges were among those investigated by the Royal Commission into Institutional Responses to Child Sexual Abuse for historical accusations. The colleges were among the worst for historical accusations of child sexual abuse of any Catholic institution in Australia. Of the 53 priests who were at New Norcia between 1950 and 2010, the proportion accused of sexually abusing children was 21.5 per cent. That compares with 7 per cent nationally. The figures were contained in a report released by the Royal Commission into Institutional Responses to Child Sexual Abuse in February 2017. During the 1960s, 29 per cent of the clergy at New Norcia had allegedly molested or abused children at some point during their career. There were 65 claims of abuse made about New Norcia, of which 26 were about a single perpetrator. The Catholic Church paid victims $869,000 in compensation. In 2016, a trial in the District Court of Western Australia was told about perverted behaviour by monks at St Benedict's College during the 1960s and 1970s.

== The town today ==
New Norcia from Great Northern Highway bypass

The town of New Norcia has buildings in a Spanish style of architecture, along with some other historical sites. Among these are the two old boarding schools, St Ildephonsus' and St Gertrude's (both now used for accommodation and various social functions), the abbey church (containing the tomb of Rosendo Salvado), an old mill, a wine press, and the monastery itself.

The town has attracted interest and tourist visits for most of its existence and as a consequence a number of guide books and histories have been produced. The visitor and information centre is in the Museum and Art Gallery.

The Benedictine monks continue to occupy the monastery and are involved with most of the enterprises in the town. The last Spanish monk of New Norcia, Dom Paulino, died on 18 January 2010, aged 99. He had worked in the monastery bakery, as a shoemaker, and "in retirement" in reviving the production of olive oil.

Much of the New Norcia farm has been sold off to pay the costs of damages resulting from the sexual abuse of children who were residents in the boarding colleges by the Benedictine monks.

=== New Norcia Museum and Art Gallery ===
The New Norcia Museum and Art Gallery is located in the converted buildings of St Joseph's Native School. Beside displaying many Christian relics and historical paintings, the gallery hosts an exhibition of finalists for the Mandorla Art Award, the only Australian award solely for Christian religious artworks based on Bible scripture themes. In 1986, 26 paintings were stolen; several weeks later, all but one were returned. Marc Fennell's 2023 three-part documentary The Mission for SBS Television revisited the investigation into the theft, and spoke to former students at the schools.

== Heritage sites ==
With decreasing numbers of active colleges, and changes in the organisation of the town, some buildings and sites have been restored and incorporated into a heritage trail within the town. The following buildings are among the heritage buildings situated on the site of the monastery, which is registered on the Register of the National Estate and classified by the National Trust of Australia WA:

Some heritage buildings at New Norcia
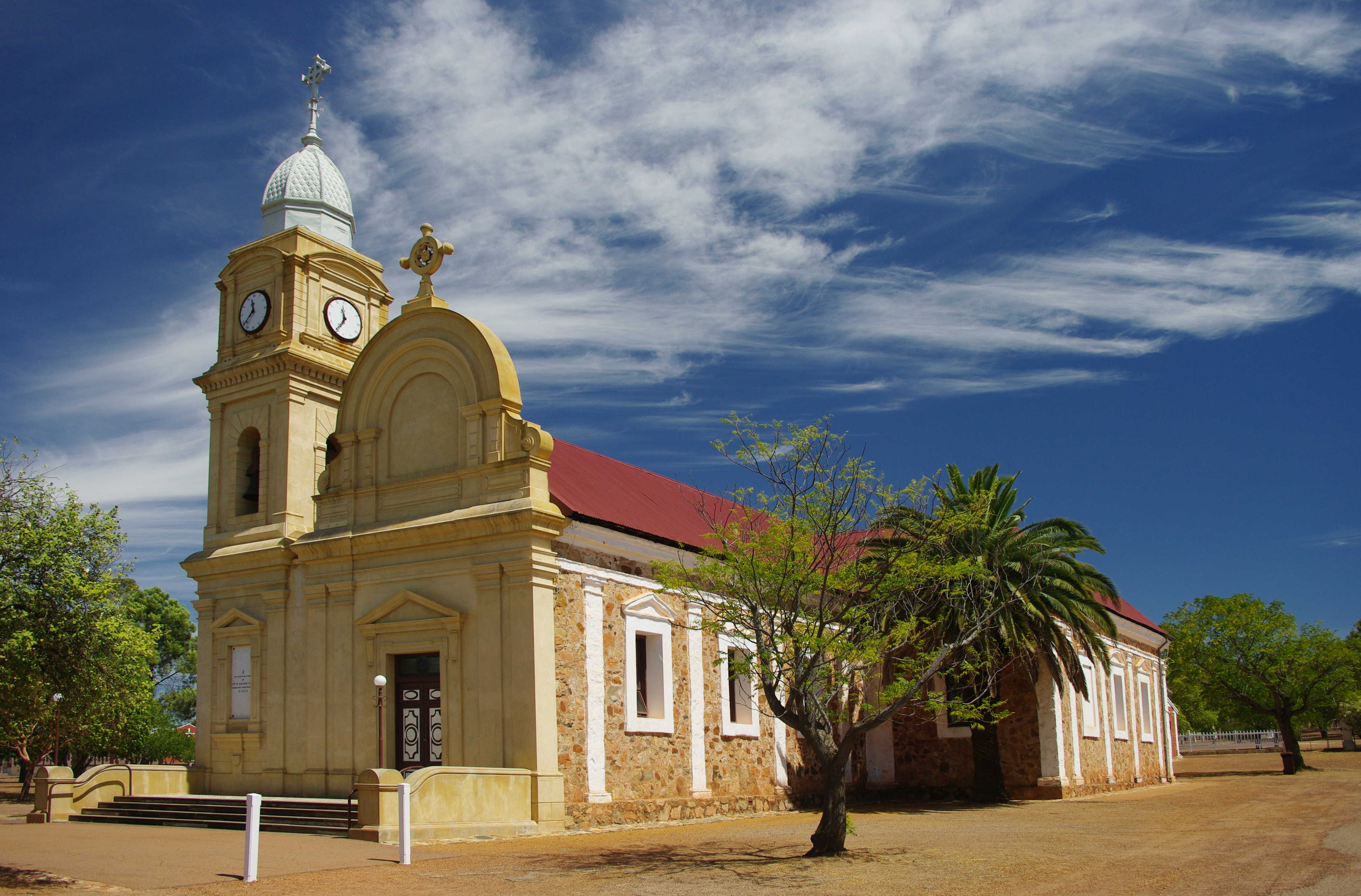
Abbey Church, contains the tomb of Dom Rosendo Salvado

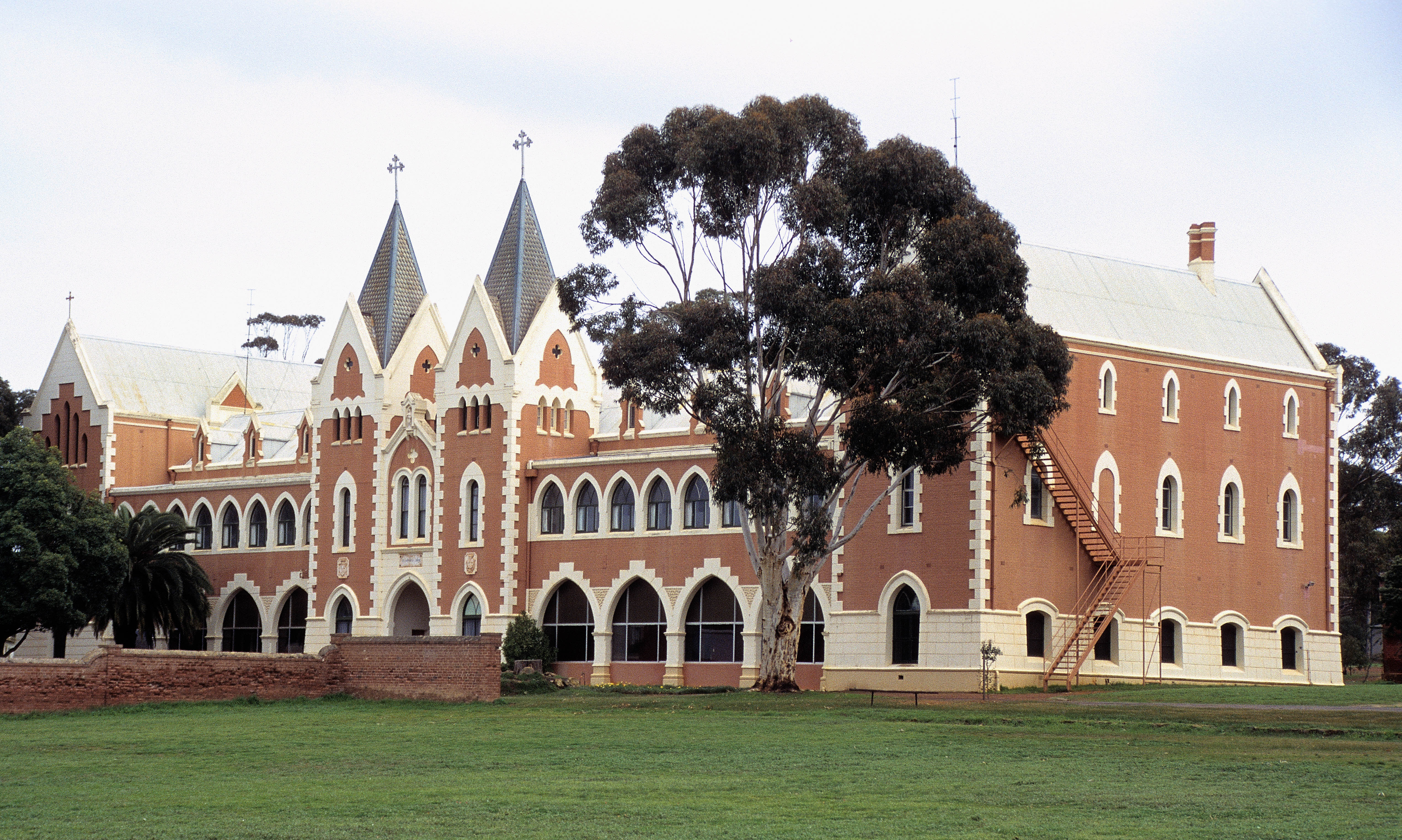
St Gertrude's

Interior of the chapel of St Gertrude's

Interior of the chapel of St Ildephonsus'

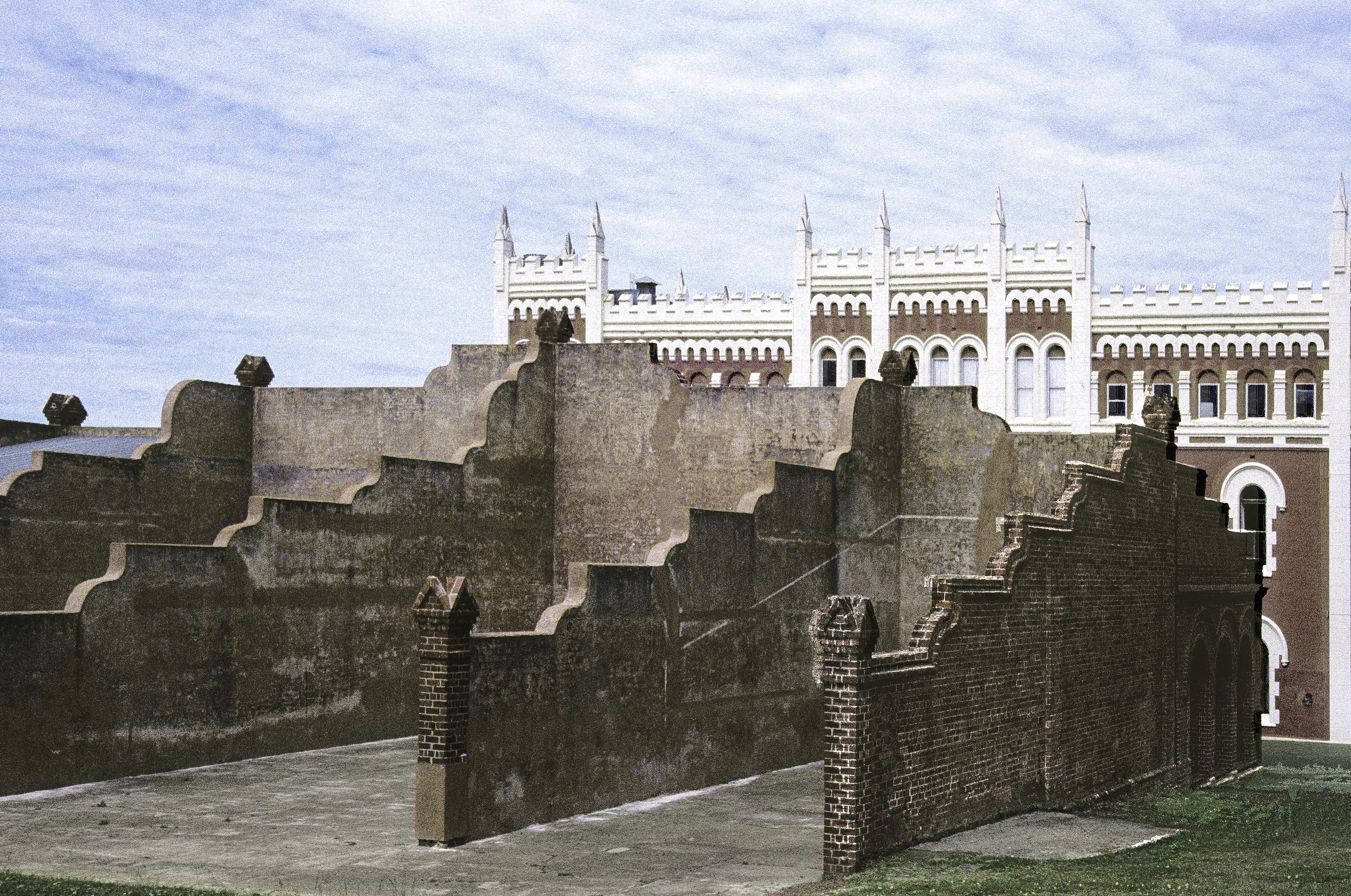
Handball court

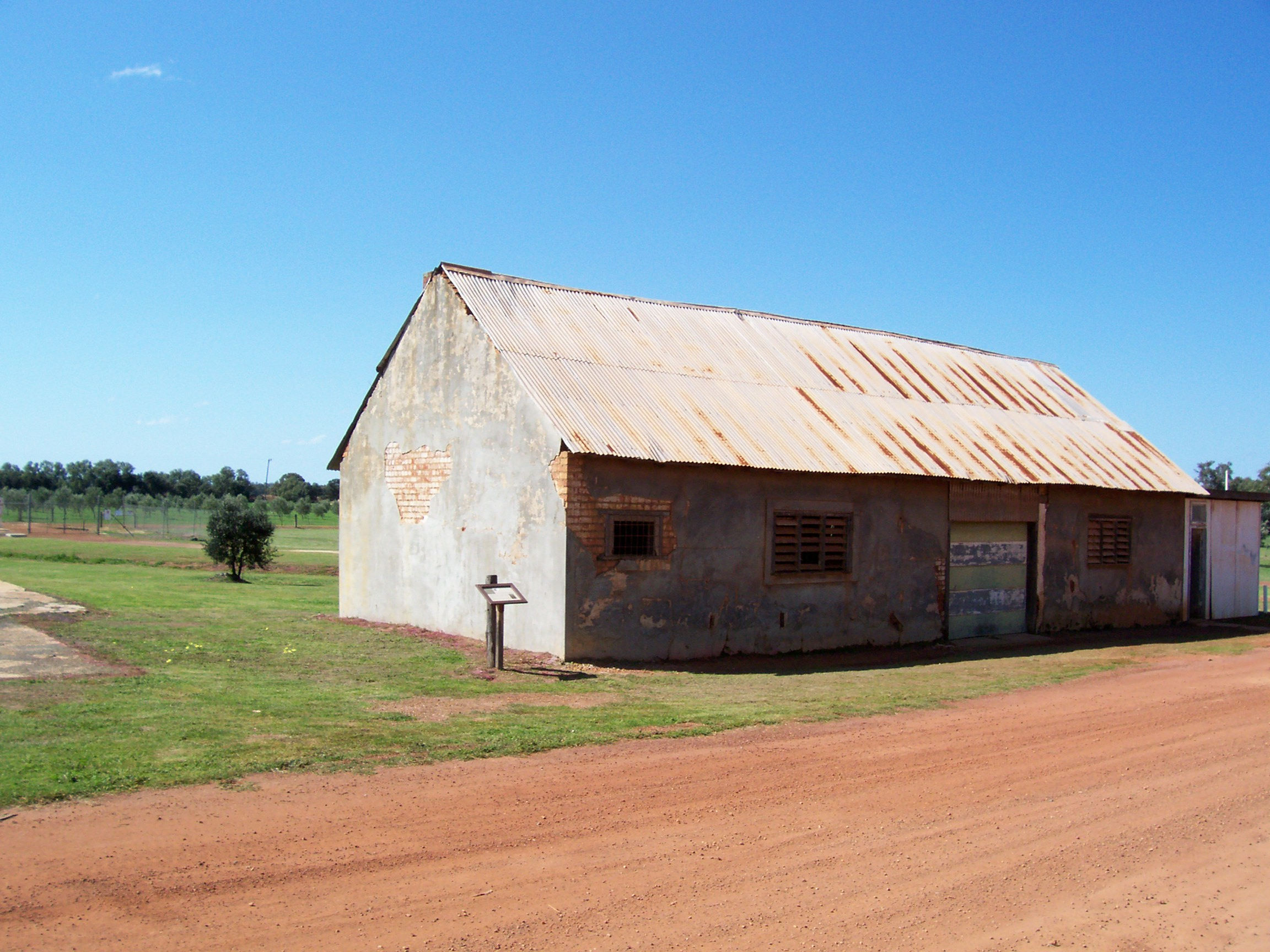
Blacksmith workshop

=== Pipe organs ===
There are two pipe organs located within the abbey buildings. In the Abbey Church of the Holy Trinity is a large German organ, built in 1922 by Albert Möser of Munich, with 34 speaking stops. The organ was designed in consultation with the abbey organist, Dom Stephen Moreno.

The second pipe organ, of 11 speaking stops and much more modern in style, is located in the oratory chapel. This organ was built in 1983 by Bellsham Pipe Organs.

== Space station ==
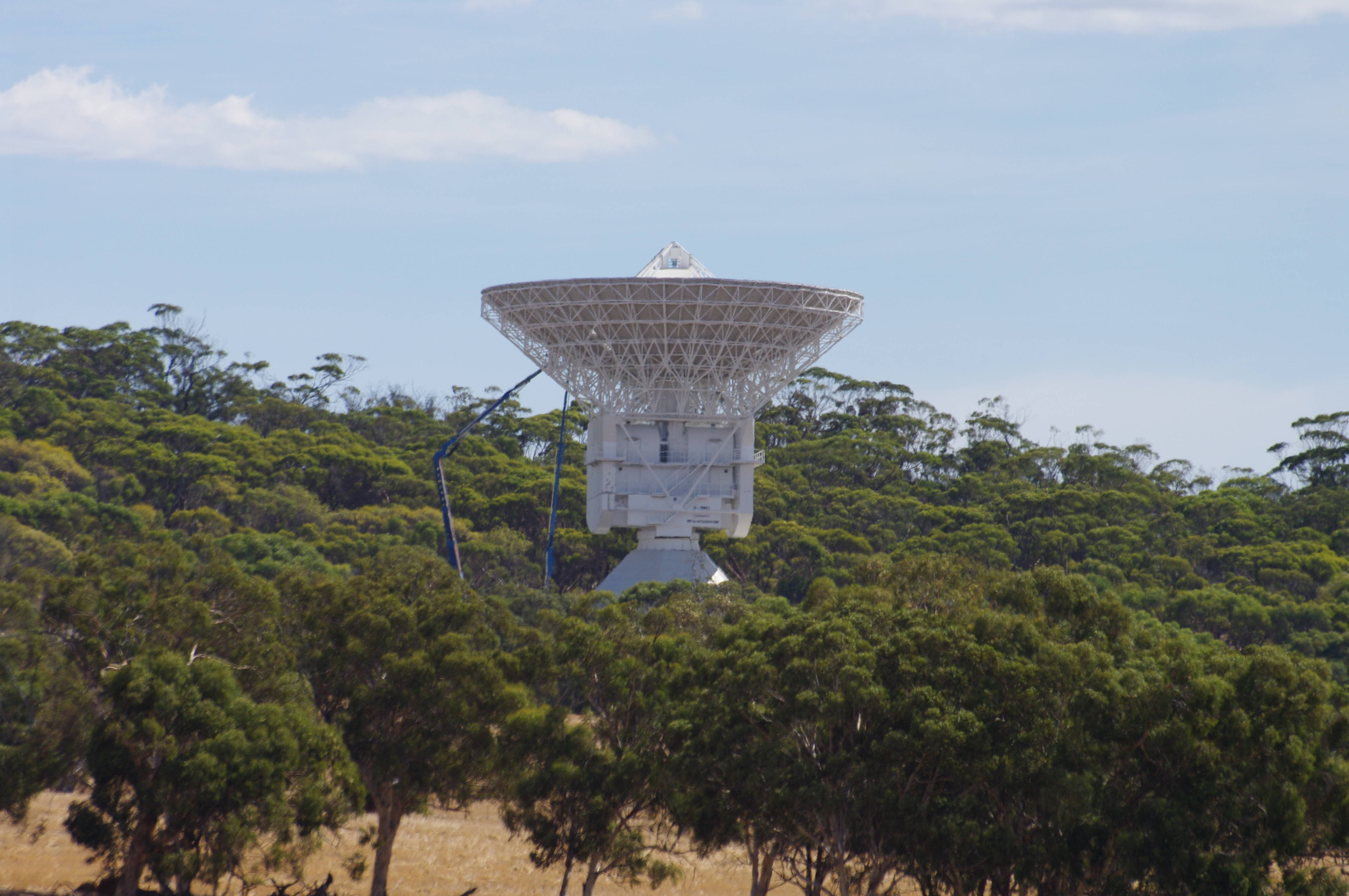
European Space Agency – New Norcia Station

The New Norcia Station, a ground station for the European Space Agency, is located 8 kilometres (5 mi) south of the town.

== Notable people ==
Notable people associated with the town include filmmaker Warwick Thornton, who attended Salvado College.

== See also ==
- New Norcia Cricket Team
