= Julie Dowling (artist) =

Indigenous Australian artist

- Born: 1969 (age 56–57); Subiaco, Perth, Australia
- Education: Claremont School of Art, Curtin University, Central Metropolitan College of TAFE
- Known for: Painting
- Awards: Mandorla Art Award 2000, National Aboriginal & Torres Strait Islander Art Award 2002
- Website: www.juliedowling.art

Julie Dowling (born 1969) is an Indigenous Australian artist whose work, in a social realist style, deals with issues of Aboriginal identity. She identifies culturally and politically as a Badimaya First Nation woman.

== Early life ==
Dowling was born at the King Edward Memorial Hospital for Women in the Perth suburb of Subiaco. Her identical twin sister, Carol, is an academic and radio documentary producer. Their single mother, Veronica, was a member of the Badimaya nation, whose traditional lands are around Paynes Find and Yalgoo in Western Australia's Gascoyne region. Along with her mother, she was strongly influenced by her maternal grandmother, Molly, who taught her much about her traditional culture; Molly had been taken from the Yalgoo area by her Irish father at the age of eleven and sent to a Catholic orphanage. The twins spent their early childhood with their mother and extended family, including Molly, in the outer Perth suburb of Redcliffe when it was mostly bushland. Her mother and the twins constantly moved within public housing around the Perth metropolitan area, fearing that welfare agencies might take the children away. While on train trips to visit their grandmother, their mother would point out people who might be trying to hide their Aboriginality, and would encourage Julie to sketch them while Carol would interview them.

== Education and career ==
Dowling attended St Francis Xavier School in Armadale and St. Joachim's School in Victoria Park. In 1989 she received a Diploma of Fine Art from the Claremont School of Art, where she was influenced by realist teachers such as Marcus Beilby. She received a Bachelor of Fine Arts from Curtin University in 1992, becoming the first woman in her family to gain a university degree. In 1995, she had her first solo exhibition at Fremantle Arts Centre and received an Associate Diploma in Visual Arts Management at Central Metropolitan College of TAFE.

Her work, in a social realist style, deals with issues of Aboriginal identity, and is informed by the experiences of her community, culture, and family.

It is inspired by such traditions as European portraiture and Christian icons, Mexican muralism, Papunya Tula dot painting, and Noongar iconography.

== Recognition ==
Dowling was a finalist for the Archibald Prize in 2001, 2002, and 2013, along with the Doug Moran National Portrait Prize in 2000 and 2013. She won the 2000 Mandorla Art Award and the painting division of the National Aboriginal & Torres Strait Islander Art Award in that year, and in 2002, she was recognised as Australia's Most Collectible Artist by the magazine Australian Art Collector. In 2006 she received an Honorary Doctorate in Literature from Murdoch University.

== Selected exhibitions ==
Dowling has exhibited in Australia and internationally, including solo exhibitions at:

- Art Gallery of Western Australia, Perth, WA, Australia, WA Now: Julie Dowling - Babanyu (Friends for Life) (2018)
- Galerie Seippel, Cologne, Germany, Julie Dowling: Malga Gurlbarl (2017)
- Geraldton Regional Art Gallery, Geraldton, WA, Australia, Yagu Gurlbarl (Big Secret): New Works From Julie Dowling (2017)
- Lawrence Wilson Art Gallery, Perth, WA, Australia, Julie Dowling: Family and Friends (2012)
