= Max Angus =

Australian painter

Max Angus AM, FRSA
- Born: Max Rupert Angus; 30 October 1914; Hobart, Tasmania, Australia
- Died: 21 February 2017 (aged 102); Hobart, Tasmania, Australia
- Education: Hobart Technical College
- Style: Watercolour landscapes
- Spouse: Thedda Corrigan
- Awards: Member of the Order of Australia; 1978
- Elected: Fellow of the Royal Society of Arts; 1987

Max Rupert Angus AM, FRSA (30 October 1914 – 21 February 2017) was an Australian painter, best known for his watercolour paintings of Tasmanian landscapes.

== Life and career ==
Angus was born in Hobart, Tasmania in 1914. In 1931, he studied art at Hobart Technical College and worked as a sign writer. He later moved to Melbourne to start a commercial art studio with his brother, Don. In 1942, Angus enlisted in the army during World War II, working as the head of the map drafting room in the intelligence department. Discharged in 1945, he returned to Hobart where he worked in several artistic media and endeavours, but ended up concentrating on watercolour paintings of the Tasmanian landscape.

In 1967, Angus was one of several Tasmanian artists and photographers who protested the proposed flooding of Lake Pedder by documenting the original state of the lake in art and photographs. When the photographer Olegas Truchanas drowned in the Gordon River in 1972, Angus wrote a definitive tribute to his friend, The World of Olegas Truchanas, published in 1975.

Angus was made a Member of the Order of Australia on Australia Day in 1978. In 1987, he was appointed as a Fellow of the Royal Society of Arts (FRSA).

== Death ==
Angus died on 21 February 2017, aged 102.
