= Robert Campbell (art gallery director) =

Robert Campbell (1902–1972) was director of the Art Gallery of South Australia, the first director of the Queensland Art Gallery and also a painter in his own right. In 1955 a portrait of him by painter Ivor Hele won the Archibald Prize.

The first painting acquired by the QAG in 1896 was Evicted, by the British painter Blandford Fletcher. Although it was the gallery's most popular picture, it was controversially retired from public display in 1949 by Campbell, who was the newly-appointed director, and who declared that it was only popular "because it had a sentimental touch".

In May 1955, while director of the AGSA, he considered it was important to establish an Aboriginal art collection, which extended beyond the anthropological objects held by the museum. He also wrote a book on Tom Roberts.

His wife Elizabeth wrote on art as "Elizabeth Young" for newspapers for New South Wales and Queensland, and in 1952 succeeded H. E. Fuller as art critic for Adelaide's Advertiser.
