= Theo Koning =

Australian artist

Theo Koning (born 1950 in the Netherlands) was a Western Australian painter, sculptor, printmaker and art teacher, who for a time exhibited with the Galerie Dusseldorf, Turner Galleries and Art Collective WA in Perth.

Koning immigrated to Western Australia in 1953 at the age of three, and graduated in fine art at the Claremont Technical School in 1973, in the same year becoming one of the founding members of the Western Australian Sculptors' Association.

Koning's works have gained extensive representation in art galleries throughout Australia, including the National Gallery of Australia.

Koning died in 2022 at age 71.
