= Coppersmith =

Person who makes artifacts from copper

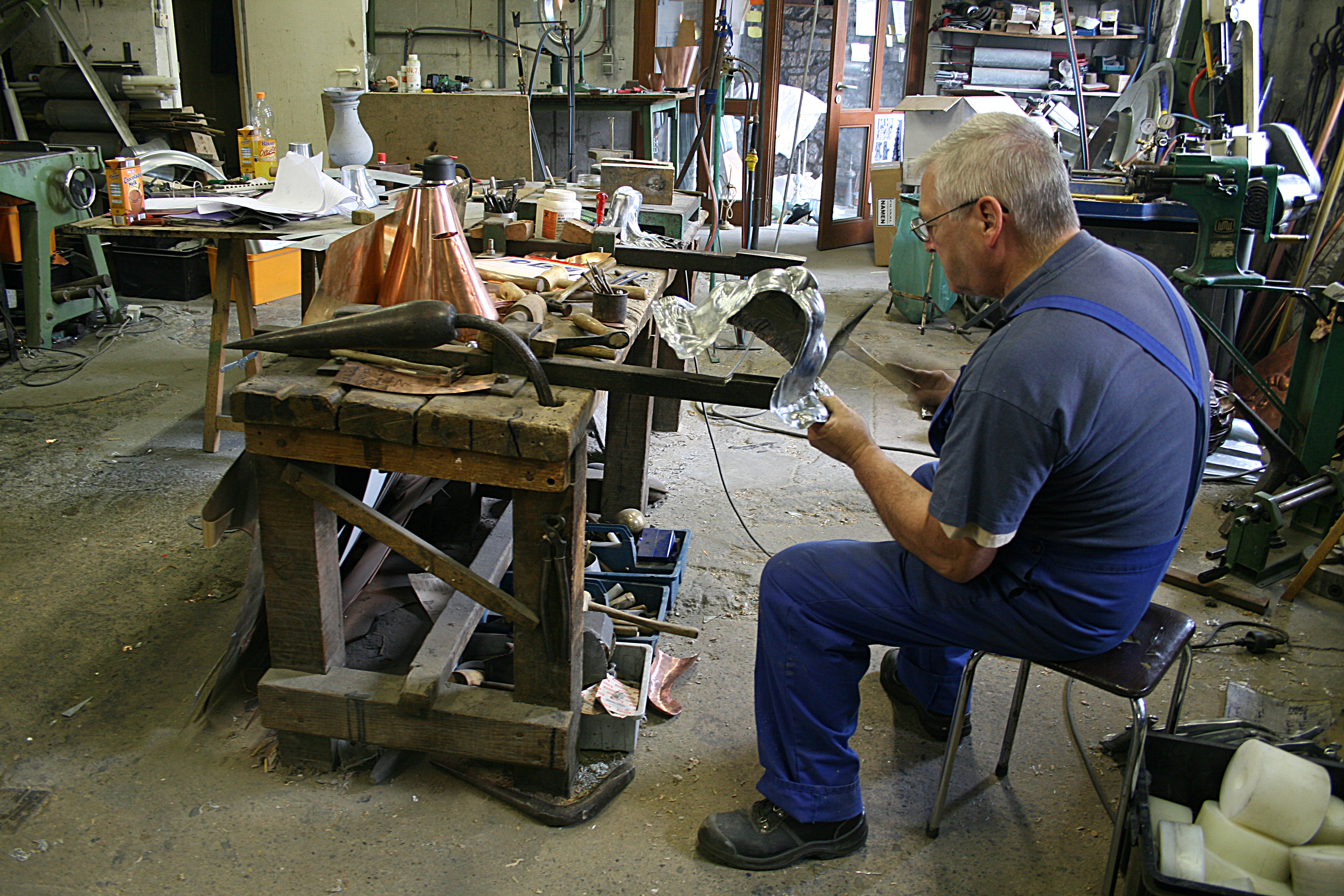
A coppersmith at work in the last workshop of brassware subsisting in Dinant, Belgium

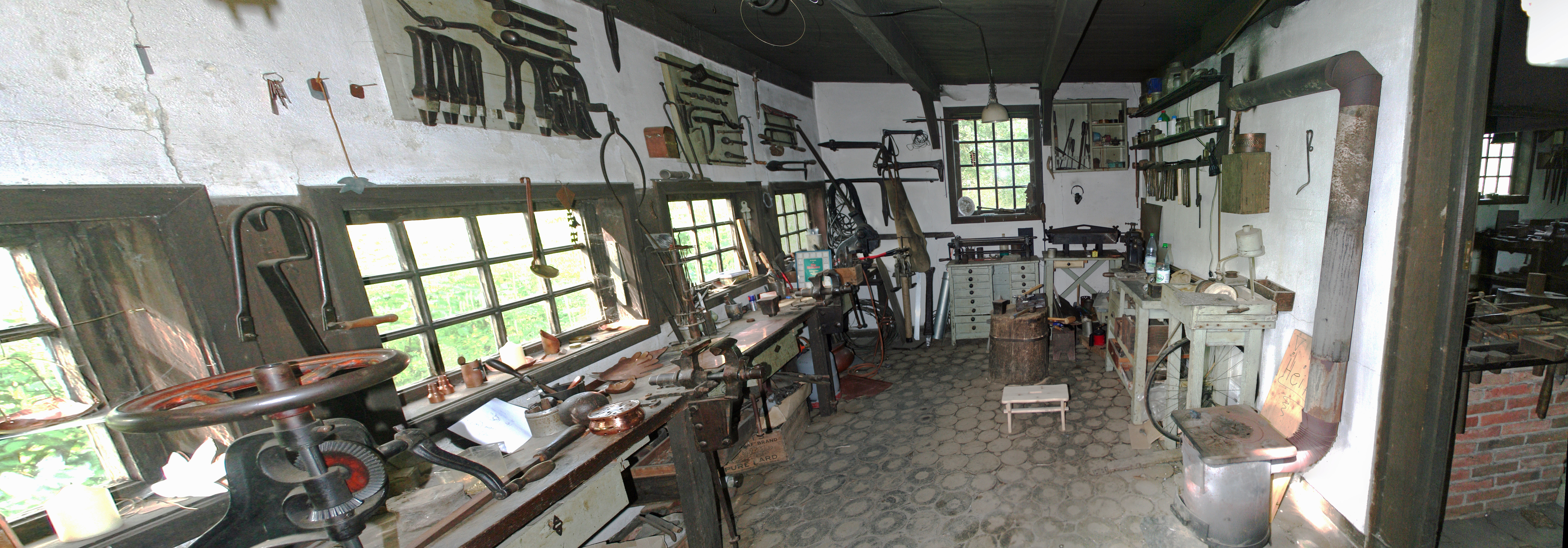
Workshop of a coppersmith in Cloppenburg, Germany; the oldest units are from the period around 1850

A coppersmith, also known as a brazier, is a person who makes artifacts from copper and brass. Brass is an alloy of copper and zinc. The term "redsmith" is used for a tinsmith that uses tinsmithing tools and techniques to make copper items.

== History ==
Anthropologists believe copper to be the first metal used by humans due to its softness and ease of manipulation. In antiquity, copper's durability and resistance to rust or corrosion proved valuable. Copper's relationship with man is thought to date back over six thousand years. Coppersmith is one of the few trades that have a mention in the Bible.

Copper was particularly worked in England, with ores smelted in Wales as early as the 1500s. Copper was found in great quantities in North America, especially Montana, as well as archaic copper mines near Lake Superior, which was recorded by a Jesuit missionary in 1659.

Coppersmithing as a trade benefited strongly from the invention of sheet metal rollers. Copper sheet was then available in a much more versatile and easy form for creating copper wares. By the 1700s, coppersmiths lived in the American colonies, but did not have access to much sheet copper due to the British Crown's regulation of copper and other goods to the Americas. Sheet metal production was prohibited in the colonies as well before the American Revolution.

== Coppersmith trade ==
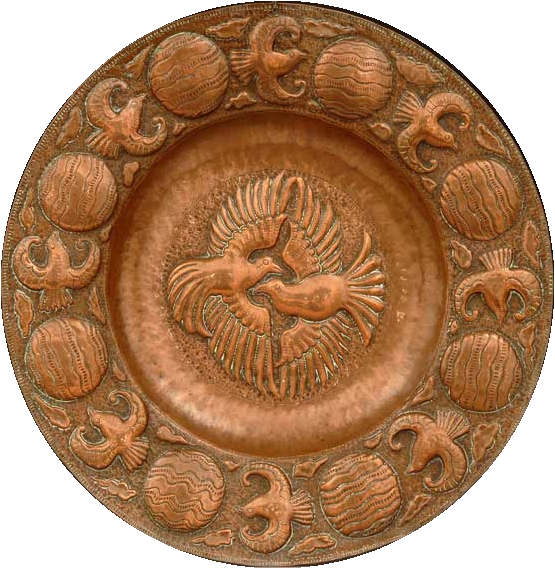
A coppern plate by John Pearson

Most coppersmiths can create, from a pattern, copper wares from a sheet of copper. They can also repair, clean and re-tin copper cookware interiors. Some copper smiths make barrels. Some coppersmiths will specialize in specific forms or items, such as a particular type of biscuit oven or mug or kettle. In the 1700 and 1800s, coppersmiths typically had a few apprentices in various stages of learning the trade working together.

Apprentices would start learning the trade usually around 8 or 9 years old. Typical duties of a youth in the copper shop would include tasks such as breaking coke or sal ammoniac blocks, scouring copper pieces to prepare them for tinning, and polishing hammers and tools.

In regions where copper is mined like Iberia and India there are a number of centers where the coppersmith trade has flourished.

== Examples of objects made by modern coppersmiths ==
These include:

- jewellery, sculptures, weather vanes, overmantels, fenders, decorative panels, and challenge shields;
- plates and cookware, cigarette cases, tobacco jars, tea and coffee pots, jugs, vases, trays, frames, rose bowls, timpani, kettles (cooking, brewing, dying, fish and hatter), stew, fry and sauce pans, warming pans or kettledrum bowls;
- awnings, light fixtures, fountains, range hoods, cupolas, and stills.
- butter churn, ship sheathing, copper mugs, ladles, funnels, basins, coal scuttle, glue pots.

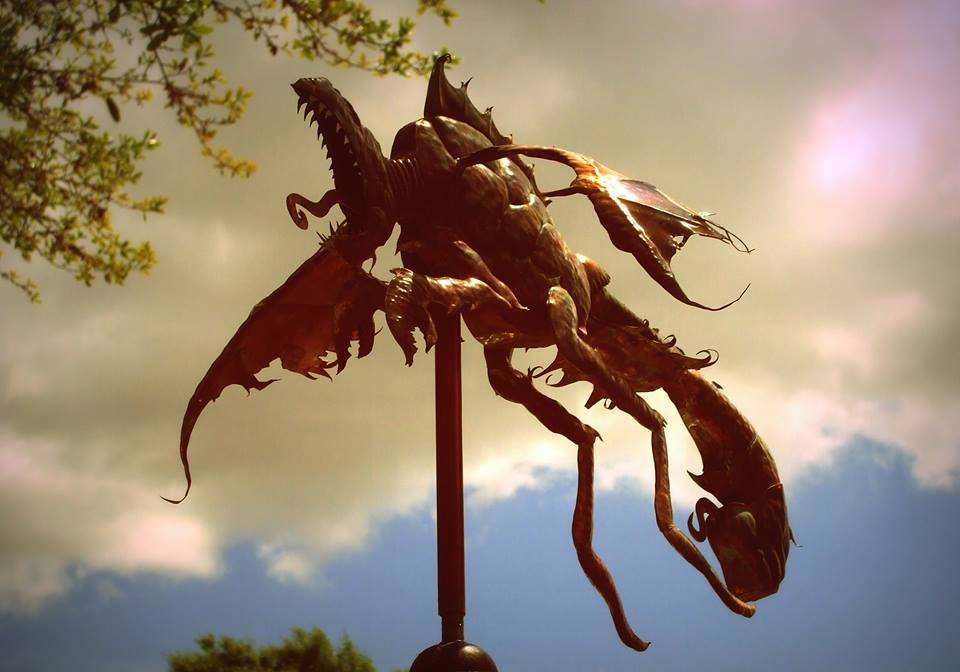
A coppern weather vane created by using traditional coppersmithing techniques

Notable copper styles in the UK include Newlyn in Cornwall and Keswick in Cumbria. Coppersmith work started waning in the late 1970s and early 1980s and those in the sheetmetal trade began doing the coppersmith's work, the practices used being similar to those in the plumbing trade. Coppersmiths in recent years have turned to pipe work, not only in copper but also stainless steel and aluminium, particularly in the aircraft industry.

== Properties of copper ==
Copper is generally considered to be a soft metal, meaning it can be worked without heating. Over a period of working the metal in this way it can "work-harden". This means that the atoms within the copper are compressed and irregular in their arrangement. This causes stress in the metal and eventually cracking the metal along these stress points. In order for the copper to be worked to any extensive degree it must be annealed. This process involves heating the metal and then rapidly cooling it in water. The cooling stage is known as quenching. By heating the copper, the atoms in the metal are relaxed, and thus able to align themselves in a more uniform fashion. This allows for easier shaping of the metal. In order to keep this uniformity within the metal, it is cooled rapidly. This prevents the atoms from moving around and causing tension in the structure of the metal. Unlike ferrous metals—which must be cooled slowly to anneal—copper can be cooled slowly in air or quickly by quenching in water.
