= Thomas Cooper Gotch =

English painter (1854–1931)

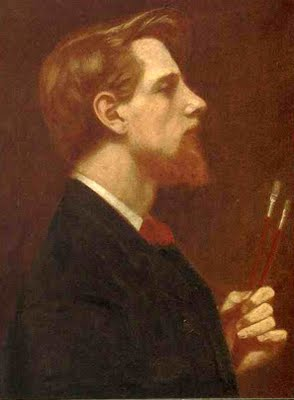
Thomas Cooper Gotch, self-portrait

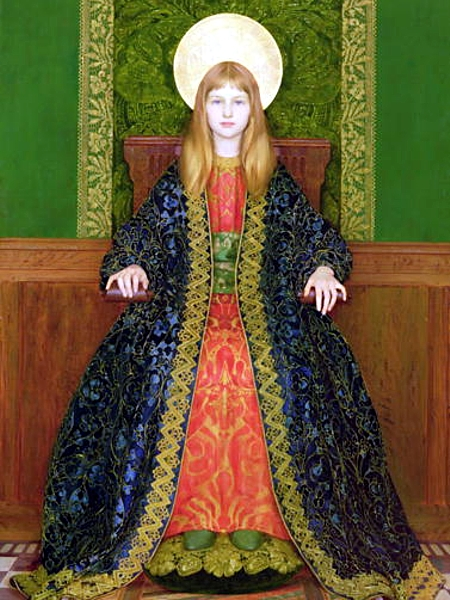
The Child Enthroned, 1894

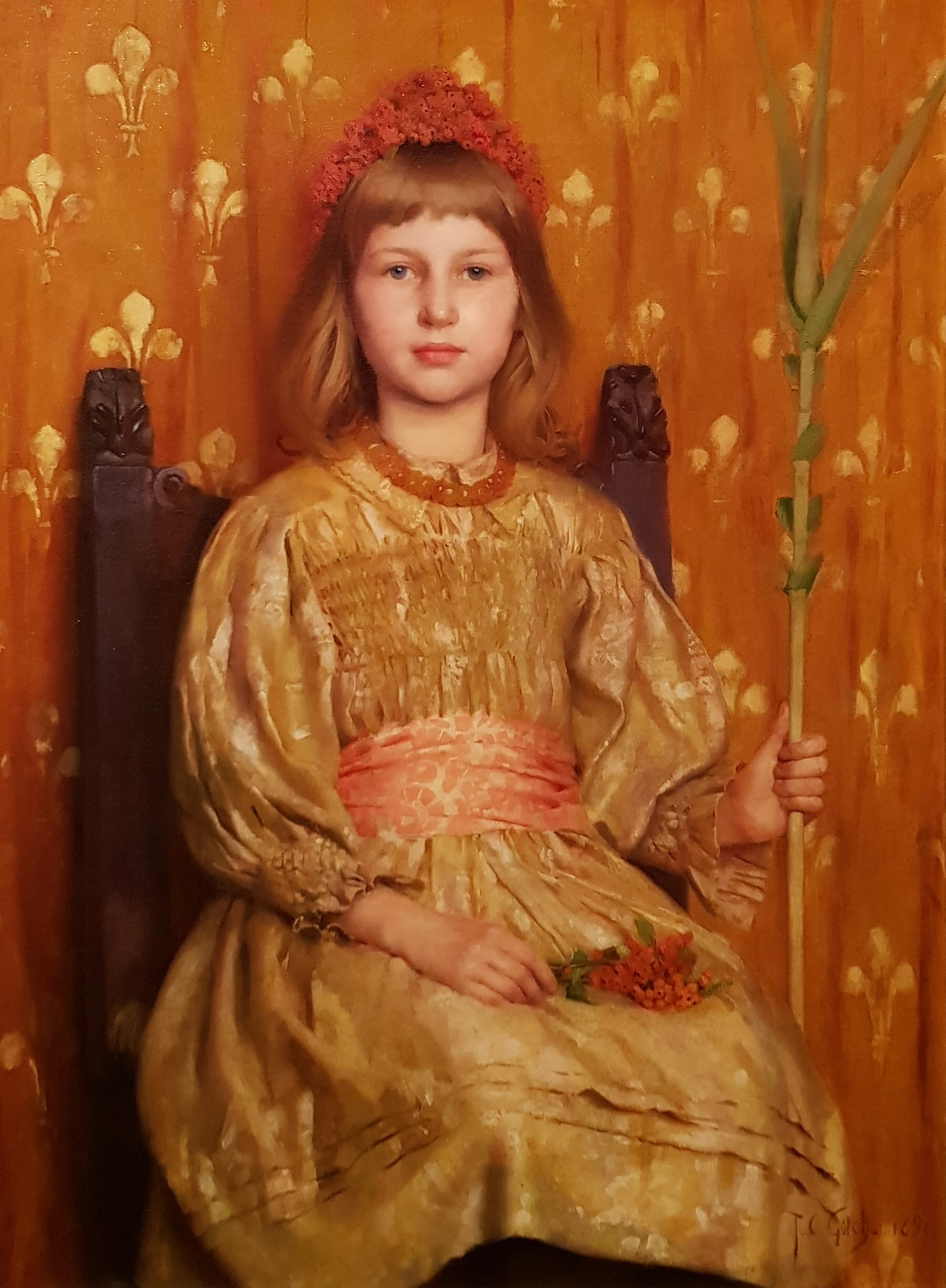
My Crown and Sceptre, 1892 (the sitter appears to be Phyllis, his daughter). This was his first work in his new style: two years later, he would rework it into the more powerful The Child Enthroned, his master work

Thomas Cooper Gotch or T. C. Gotch (1854–1931) was an English painter and book illustrator loosely associated with the Pre-Raphaelite movement; he was the brother of John Alfred Gotch, the architect.

Gotch studied art in London and Antwerp before he married and studied in Paris with his wife, Caroline, a fellow artist. Returning to Britain, they settled into the Newlyn art colony in Cornwall. He first made paintings of natural, pastoral settings before immersing himself in the romantic, Pre-Raphaelite romantic style for which he is best known. His daughter was often a model for the colourful depictions of young girls.

His works have been exhibited at the Royal Academy, Royal College of Art and the Paris Salon.

== Personal life ==
Thomas Gotch was born 10 December 1854 in the Mission House in Kettering, Northamptonshire. He was the fourth son born to Mary Ann Gale Gotch and Thomas Henry Gotch (born 1805), who was a shoe maker. (Note: Before he began his artistic studies Gotch worked in his father's business for three years.) He had an elder brother, John Alfred Gotch, who was a successful architect and author.

In 1881, he married fellow art student Caroline Burland Yates (1854–1945) at Newlyn's St Peter's Church. His daughter, Phyllis Marion Gotch, was sometimes a model for her father. (Note: Phyllis was born in France in 1882. She and her circle of friends (used by Gotch as models) inspired the stories of H. D. Lowry. Phyllis later became a writer and singer, and married around 1913.) After completing his studies, Gotch travelled to Australia in 1883. Gotch and his wife settled in Newlyn, Cornwall in 1887. The couple and their daughter were key participants in the Newlyn art colony.

In addition to his time spent in France and Belgium while studying art, Gotch also travelled to Austria, Australia, South Africa, Italy and Denmark.

Thomas Cooper Gotch died on 1 May 1931 of a heart attack while in London for an exhibition. He was buried in Sancreed churchyard in Cornwall.

== Education ==
With his parents' support, in 1876 and 1877 he first studied at Heatherley's art school in London and then at Koninklijke Academie voor Schone Kunsten in Antwerp in 1877 and 1878. Then in 1879 Gotch attended Slade School of Fine Art with Alphonse Legros in London. Gotch met his friend Henry Scott Tuke and his future wife Caroline Yates at Slade. After their marriage, Thomas and Caroline studied in Paris at Académie Julian and Académie Laurens in the early 1880s. It was in Paris that he adopted the plein-air approach of painting outdoors.

== Career ==
In Newlyn he founded the Newlyn Industrial Classes, where the local youth could learn the arts & crafts. He also helped to set up the Newlyn Art Gallery, and served on its committee all his life. Among his friends in Newlyn was fellow artist Stanhope Forbes and Albert Chevallier Tayler.

In Newlyn, like other art colony artists, he used the plein-air approach for making paintings outdoors. He was also inspired by James McNeill Whistler's techniques for creating compositions and paintings.

His style changed following an 1891-1892 a visit to Paris and Florence; His works were transformed from the Newlyn "rural realistic" style to a Pre-Raphaelite style that embraced more vibrant, exuberant colours and "returned to allegorical genre painting". His first such painting was My Crown and Sceptre made in 1892, Commenting upon his new style, Tate said:

His new combination of symbolic female figures, decorative Italian textiles and the static order of early Renaissance art finally brought him recognition.

On the provisional committee for the 1895 opening of the Newlyn Art Gallery, Gotch exhibited The Reading Hour and A Golden Dream at the inaugural exhibition.

Chris Leuchars for Project Kettering has said of Gotch's work:

Although Thomas Gotch is not widely recognised in international art histories, his position and friendships in Newlyn, and the mastery of his artwork, provide him some level of recognition in British painting history and his works make valuable contributions to collections around the world. He has work in key collections in Australia, New Zealand, South Africa and the United Kingdom.

Thomas Gotch was a recognised success during his lifetime and enjoyed considerable public acclaim. He was a regular exhibitor at London's Royal Academy and contributed to numerous other national and international exhibitions. His works are still regularly exhibited and are often the subject of academic studies.

Over his artistic career Gotch was also a model for other artists. For instance, he modelled for illustrations of King Arthur's Wood for Elizabeth Forbes.

== Memberships ==
He helped establish, was a prominent force or member of the following organizations.

- New English Art Club (NEAC) - founding member
- Newlyn Industrial Classes - founder
- Newlyn Art Gallery - Committee member
- Newlyn Society of Artists (NSA), Newlyn, Cornwall - from 1895, chairman from 1924 to 1931
- Royal British Colonial Society of Artists (RBC) - founding member and President between 1913 and 1928
- Royal Institute of Painters in Water Colours (RI)
- Royal Society of British Artists (RBA)
- Royal West of England Academy (RWA)

== Exhibitions ==
The following had exhibitions of Gotch's work:

During his life:

- 1880 +: Royal Academy
- 1888: An Artist of the Newlyn School., Manchester City Art Gallery
- 1890: Dowdeswells
- 1894: Nottingham
- 1895: Opening exhibition and thereafter for the Newlyn Art Gallery.
- 1896: Won a gold medal at the Berlin Exhibition.
- 1902: Whitechapel
- 1910: Newcastle retrospective show
- He also exhibited at Paris Salon.

Following his death

- 1958: Newlyn Society of Artists, Truro
- 1979: Artists of the Newlyn School
- 1987: Newlyn Art Gallery
- 1987: Royal College of Art
- 1992: Artists from Cornwall Exhibit, RWE, Bristol
- 2001: T. C. Gotch: The Last of the Pre-Raphaelites, Royal Cornwall Museum Exhibition, Truro
- 2005: Faces of Cornwall Exhibition at Penlee House, Penzance exhibited Mrs Sherwood Hunter.

== Works ==
Gotch produced landscapes, portraits and genre works using watercolour, oil and pastels. The following is a partial list of his works. Most of his earnings came from painting portraits, particularly children and women.

- A Garden
- A Golden Dream, 1895. Used for theme for 100th anniversary of Newlyn Art Gallery.
- A Jest
- Alleluia, 1896, Tate Gallery. Purchased for the nation. One of the best examples of Gotch's Pre-Raphaelite works.
- An Old Salt, 1888
- Blossom (Girl in a Cornish garden)
- Crossing the Bar, 1923
- Dalaphne
- Dawn of Womanhood, 1900
- Death the Bride, 1894/5
- Evening
- Fireside Story
- Girl at Porch, Chywoone Hill, Newlyn, 1889, oil, Penlee House
- Girl in a Cornish Garden, Penlee House
- Harvest
- Heir to All the Ages, 1897
- High Velt, South Africa, 1910
- It is an Ancient Mariner, 1925
- John Alfred Gotch, 1926
- Mental Arithmetic
- Mounts Bay
- Mounts Bay, Autumn, 1905
- Mrs Sherwood Hunter, oil on canvas
- My Crown and Sceptre, 1892. First Pre-Raphaelite style painting.
- Penzance from Newlyn
- Portrait of a girl with eyes closed, charcoal
- Portrait of Phyllis Gotch in Blue, 198?
- Self Portrait, 1912
- Sharing Fish, ca. 1910, Royal Cornwall Museum, Truro
- Sir William Drake in the Morning Room, 1885
- Study of a Young Woman
- Study for 'The Birthday Party
- The Awakening
- The Birthday, 1930
- The Child Enthroned, 1894
- The Clarinet Player
- The Dancing Lesson
- The Exile
- The Flag, 1910
- The Lantern Parade, 1910
- The Madonna of the Mount, 1926
- The Message 1903
- The Mother Enthroned, 1912-1919
- The Nymph, 1920
- The Nymph and The Exile, 1929–30
- The Orchard, 1887, notable early work
- The Pageant of Children, 1895
- The Reading Hour, 1895
- The Return From The Pageant, 1907
- The Sailor's Farewell, oil, Penlee House
- The Story of the Money Pig
- The Vow, 1920s?
- The Wizard, notable early work
- Young Girl Reading a Manuscript

== Gallery ==
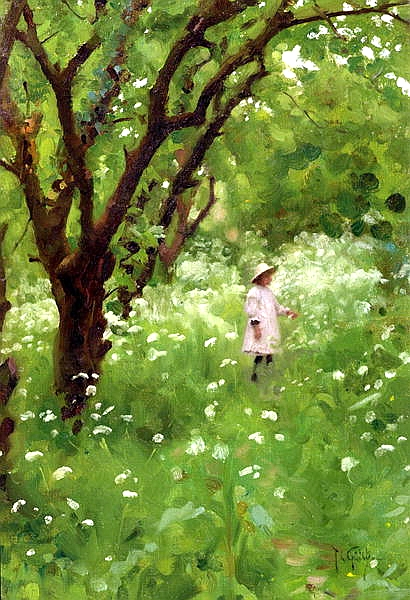
The Orchard, 1887

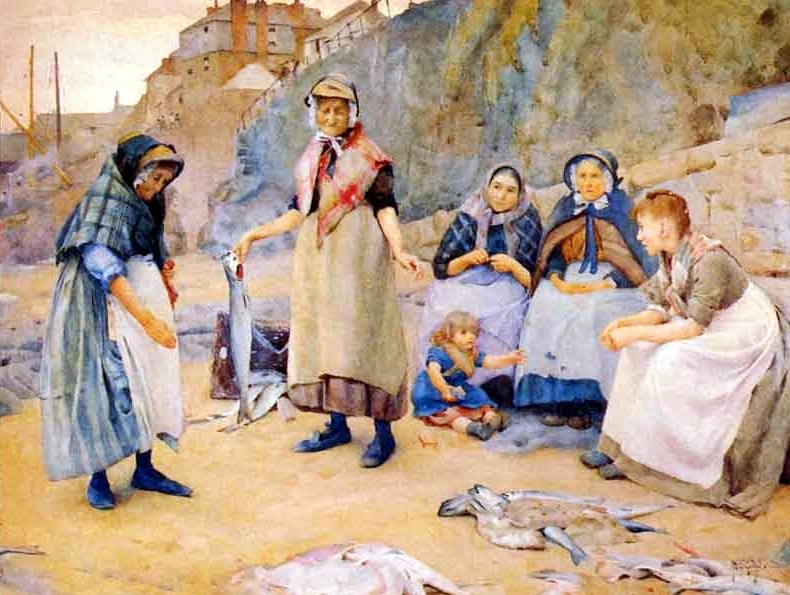
Sharing Fish, 1891

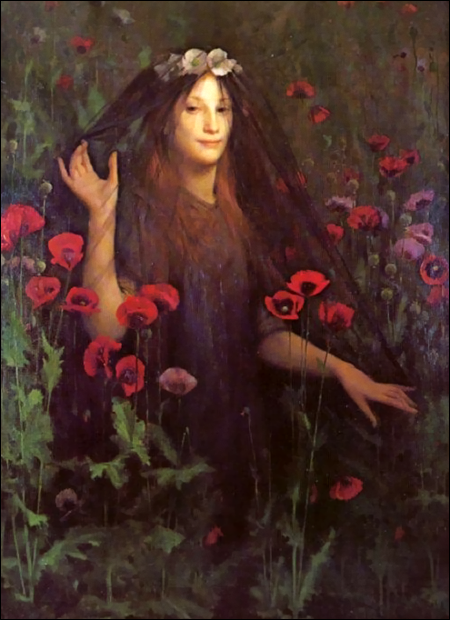
Death the Bride (1894/5)

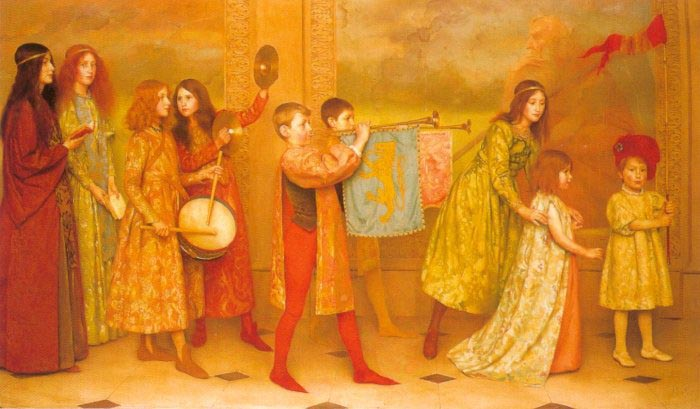
The Pageant of Childhood, 1895

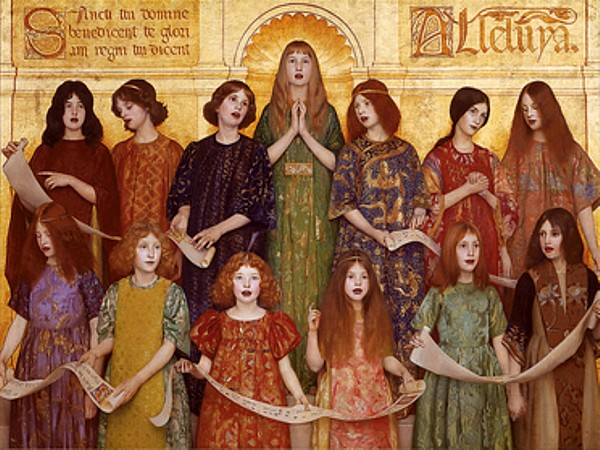
Alleluia, 1896

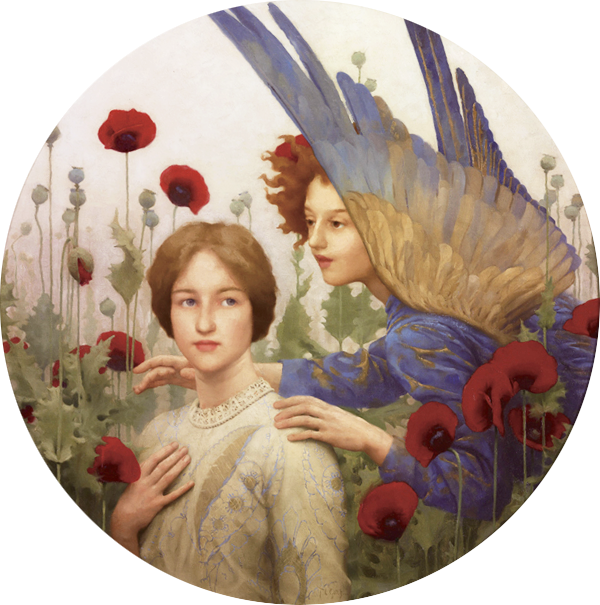
The Message, 1903

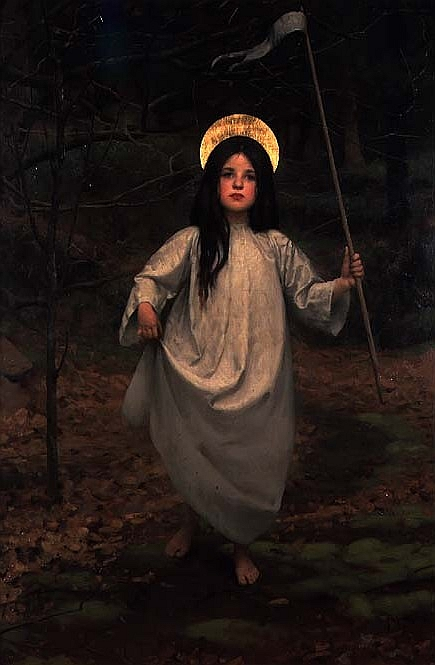
The Flag, 1910

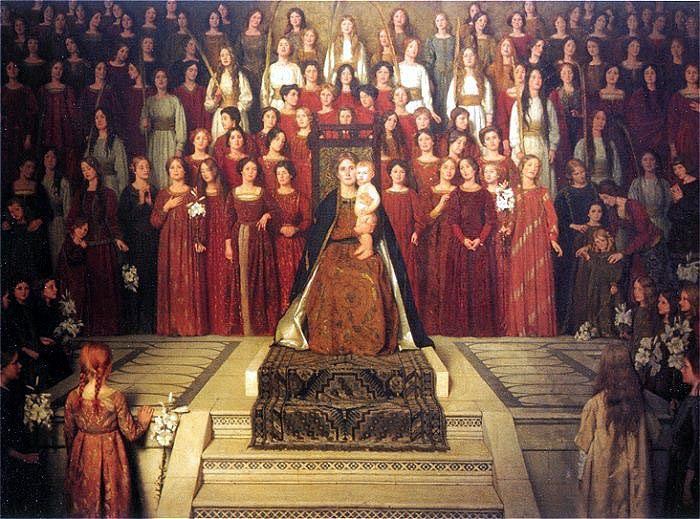
The Mother Enthroned, 1912-1919

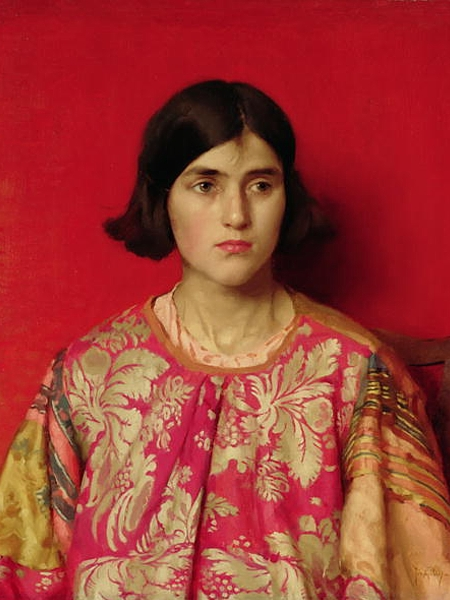
The Exile, 1930

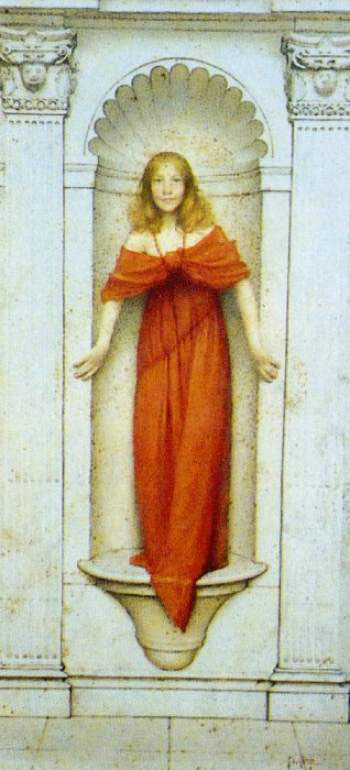
A Jest

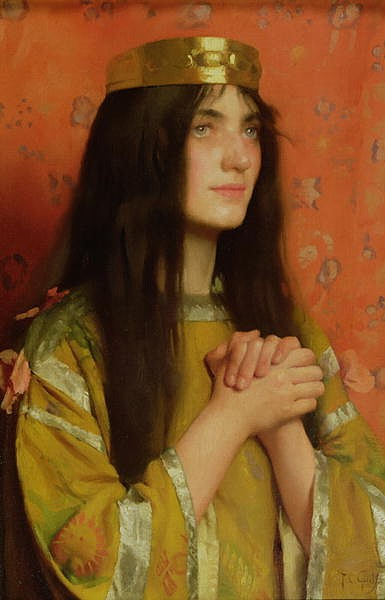
La Reine Clothilde

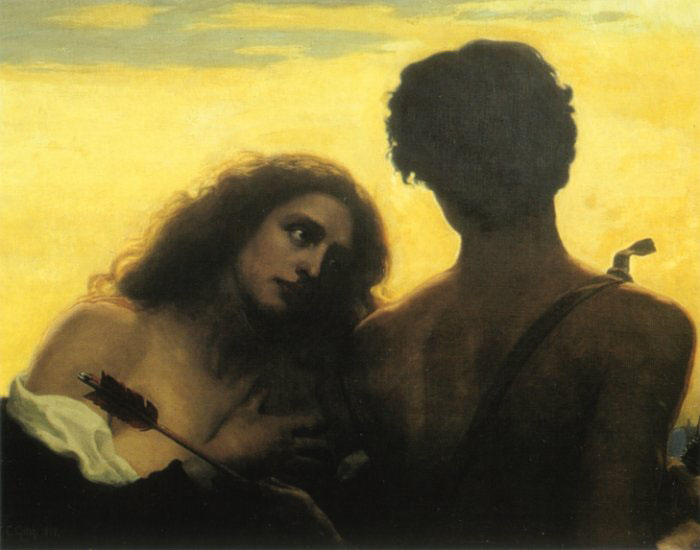
Monsigneur Love

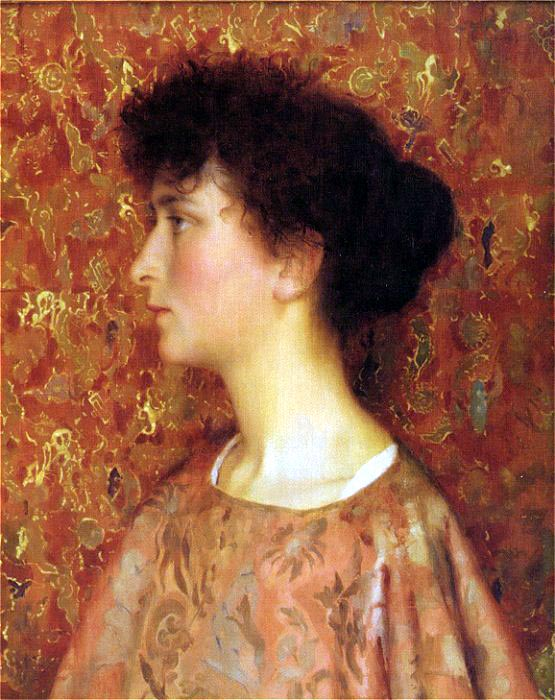
Study of a Young Woman

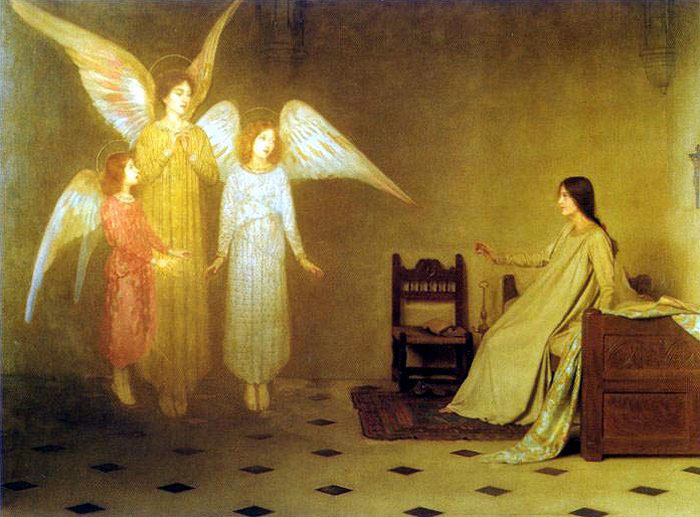
The Awakening

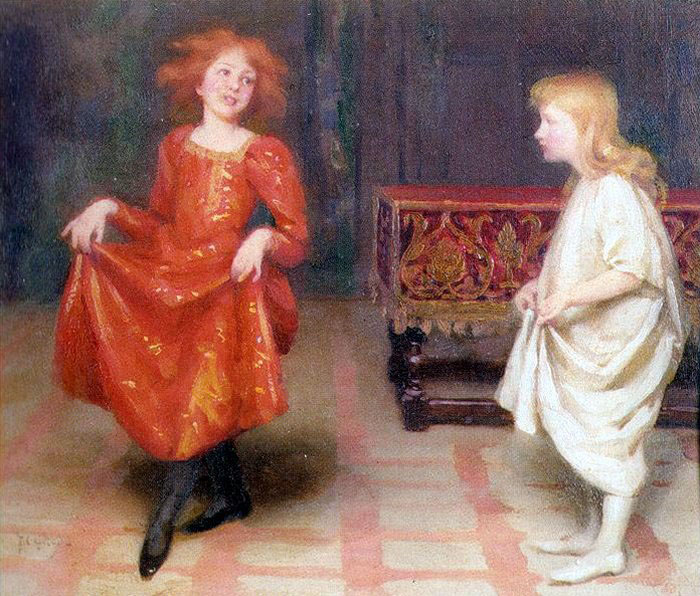
The Dancing Lesson

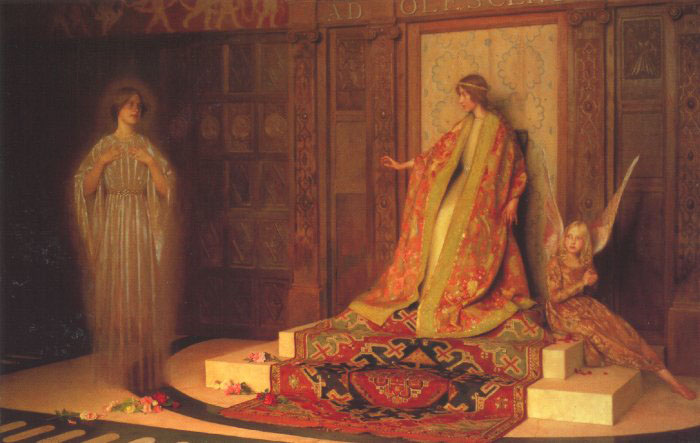
The Dawn of Womanhood

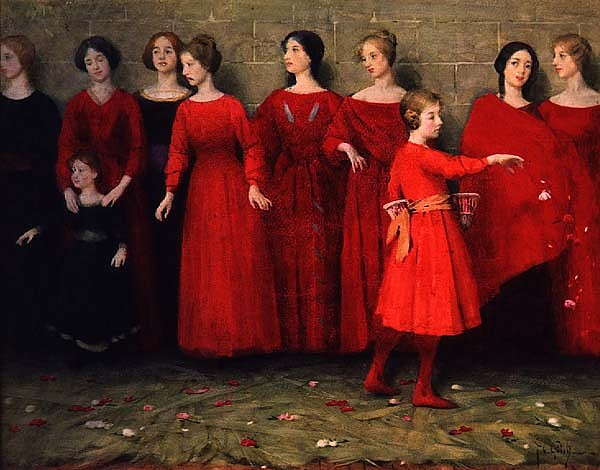
They Come

Gotch collaborated with John Drew Mackenzie on a set of copper plates that represents air, earth, fire and water, melding the styles of both artists in a symbolic Biblical theme.
