= Obed Nicholls =

English artist

Obed Nicholls (1885–1962) was an artist in copper repousse in the Art Nouveau style of Newlyn in Cornwall.

He was born without the use of his legs and used a wheelchair in his parents' house. John Drew Mackenzie, founder of the Newlyn Industrial Class, arranged for him to attend evening classes until he became sufficiently skilled to work at home on his own production. He is now regarded as one of the finest of the Newlyn workers.

== See also ==
- Newlyn Copper
