= Caroline Gotch =

English artist (1854-1945)

- Born: Caroline Burland Yates; 9 May 1854; Liverpool, England
- Died: 14 December 1945 (aged 91)
- Education: Heatherley School of Fine Art; Slade School of Fine Art; Academie Julian
- Known for: Painting
- Spouse: Thomas Cooper Gotch

Caroline Burland Gotch (née Yates, 9 May 1854 – 14 December 1945) was a British artist and part of the Newlyn School.

== Biography ==
Gotch was born in Liverpool. She was the youngest of the three daughters of Edward Yates, a wealthy local property owner. She studied at the Heatherley School of Fine Art in 1878 and then at the Slade School of Art in London before enrolling at the Academie Julian in Paris during 1880. While at the Slade she met Thomas Cooper Gotch and the couple married in August 1881 at St Peter's Church in Newlyn. They returned to France, where their daughter, Phyllis Maureen, was born in September 1882. Despite protracted periods of ill-health following child-birth, Gotch and her husband travelled extensively including an 1883 trip to Australia. They lived in London between 1884 and 1887 before settling in Newlyn where they eventually built a family home, Wheal Betsy. In Newlyn the couple were founding members of the St Ives Art Club and active in the artists' groups then being established in the area.

Caroline Gotch exhibited regularly at the Royal Academy between 1887 and 1895 and with the Royal Society of British Artists throughout the 1880s. Gotch showed at the Paris Salon in 1897 and 1898 where she was awarded second and third place medals. She showed works at the Royal Hibernian Academy in 1879, at the New English Art Club in 1888, at the Society of Women Artists in 1879 and 1893 and also with the Royal Glasgow Institute of the Fine Arts between 1886 and 1894. In both 1895 and 1896, she had pieces shown at the Glass Palace in Munich. Gotch also showed at commercial galleries, including the Grosvenor Gallery, the Goupil Gallery and the Fine Art Society. Despite her exhibition record, very few examples of Gotch's work survive but photographs show sophisticated compositions, often featuring women and children in domestic settings.
