= Phyllis Marion Gotch =

Child of Newlyn-based artists, Caroline Burland Yates and Thomas Cooper Gotch

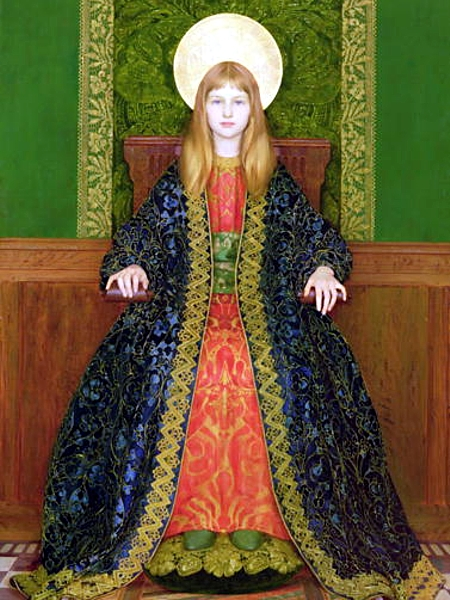
The Child Enthroned 1894 by T. C. Gotch, featuring his daughter Phyllis Maureen Gotch

Phyllis Marian Gotch (1882–1963), also known as Phyllis Maureen Gotch and in later life as Marquise de Verdières, was the only child of Newlyn-based artists, Caroline Burland Yates and Thomas Cooper Gotch. She featured in several of her father's paintings, one of the most famous being The Child Enthroned. She later became a singer, a published author and campaigned for community issues in Newlyn. After the death of her first husband in 1918 she married Andre, Marquis de Verdières. Following their divorce in 1935 she married her cousin once removed, Jocelyn Bodilly, who became Chief Justice in the Western Pacific.

== Background ==
Gotch's parents met at the Slade School of Art, where they were studying, and they married in Newlyn on 31 August 1881. Gotch, who was their only child, was born in Paris, France, on 6 September 1882. She was initially cared for by a nurse and relatives, whilst her mother recovered from an illness. Later she travelled extensively with her parents, including trips to the continent. In 1892 she was baptised in Newlyn and in 1894 she became a boarder at St Katherine's School, St Andrews, Scotland.

== Early career ==
In 1903, she wrote and illustrated a book for children called The Romance of a Boo-Bird Chic, which was followed up in 1904 with another called Tuffy and the Merboo. In about 1909, she became editor of the Penzance Church of England High School and Old Girls’ Club magazine called Merry Maidens, published by Eleanor Hare. It was a high-quality publication with illustrations by local artists, including Charles Simpson and Laura Knight.

Other books she wrote included: Once I had a home: the diary and narrative of Nadejda, lady of honour to Their Imperial Majesties the late Empress Alexandra Feodorovna and the Empress Maria Feodorovna of Russia. Published 1926, though her claim to be its author has been challenged. She later wrote Golden Hair under the name of Marquise de Verdieres (Falise Maureen de Verdieres) published 1938.

In about 1904, Gotch started her classical singing career. She studied with the opera singer Charles Santley, who was a friend of the Gotch family. She was said to be a mezzo-soprano and her early repertoire included classical works that were interposed with some traditional English songs. By 1910, she had formulated a stage act performing the folk songs whilst dressed in a "quaint puffed and flowered gown of the Georgian period". She also started to use the name Phyllis April Gotch. In 1911, she took her act to South Africa to fulfill an engagement, but she was not well received. She was forced to modify and adapt her routine, and gradually won over the audiences.

== Marriage ==
=== Patrick Doherty ===
Whilst in South Africa, Gotch met an old friend from Cornwall called Richard Ernest Biggs Doherty ("Patrick"). They had last seen each other in April 1911 when Doherty was staying with the Gotch family in Newlyn. He was born in County Cork in 1882, M.A. at Trinity College, Dublin, and for a period had been a Lieutenant in the Royal Munster Fusiliers. His sister, Jessica Florence Doherty, had married Cornish-based artist Frank Gascoigne Heath in 1910. Gotch and Doherty, who was by now employed as a mining engineer, married in South Africa on 11 March 1913. In 1914 Gotch travelled to England for a holiday, leaving her husband behind. Due to the declaration of war on Germany in August of that year, she was unable to return to South Africa. She also discovered at this time that she was pregnant and her child, Deirdre Patricia Maureen Doherty (Patsy), was born on 16 March 1915 in Cornwall. She never saw her husband again because he died in Cradock, Cape, South Africa on 2 September 1918. Patsy was Gotch’s only child.

During the First World War, Gotch helped form the local Women Volunteer Motor Drivers (WVMD) at Moretonhampstead, Devon, becoming its first Lady Commandant.

=== Andre, Marquis de Verdières ===
In 1922, she married André Marie, Marquis de Verdières in St George's, Hanover Square, London. In her biography of Thomas Gotch, The golden dream: a biography of Thomas Cooper Gotch, author Pamela Lomax says that Phyllis met Marquis de Verdières in St Tropez in 1921, and both "thought they had found wealthy partners". The wedding announcement in French newspapers named him as Andre Schlossmacher de Verdières. The title, Marquis, in France is often just a courtesy title used by children of French nobility and in this case probably relates to the family of de Verdières' mother, who referred to herself as Dame Mathilde Icard De Verdieres, a descendant of the Raismes family.

Gotch often stayed at her parents’ house in Newlyn called Wheal Betsy. It was constructed as a family home, completed in about 1909 and included a studio and gallery. The Arts & Crafts style building was named after the adjacent disused mine workings called Wheal Elizabeth. After her marriage, Gotch and her new husband Andre, found accommodation in Zennor. However, their marriage was short-lived; they separated in 1928 and divorced in 1935. One consequence of this marriage to a French national was that she lost her British nationality, and in 1937 she had to apply for a British Naturalisation Certificate.

Gotch's divorce from de Verdières was on the grounds of his adultery, and the suit was undefended. Soon after they parted, he wrote to Gotch explaining that he had grown fond of a woman in Finland, where he had been teaching. Later in 1934 it became known that he was living with an American woman in Hotel de Luteze, Paris. This woman was American widowed actress, Mildred Arden, married name Mildred Blandy, daughter of actor Edwin Hunter Arden. She returned to America at the start of WWII whilst de Verdières remained in France. The 1940 census for Rye, Westchester, New York, confirms that she was resident in Paris, France, in 1935. In America, she became known as Marquise Mildred de Verdieres and died in Austin, Texas, aged 69, on 14 December 1955. The death certificate gave her name as Mildred A de Verdières and her status as widowed. In the Hartford Courier article (25 July 1944) Mildred says that her husband had remained behind in France in hiding, waiting for the day when he and others can arise and strike a blow for victory and freedom. In the book Je suis le chat qui va tout seul... about the life of young French resistance fighter François Raveau, there is mention of a man he knew during the war called André de Verdières, real name Schlossmacher who became a mentor to him. Another reference to de Verdières in the war is taken from war diaries of Louis Christiaens and Lucie Christiaens-Hecquet, published in an article in XIe Colloque des Amis de Cadouin 2015; here he is named as Schlosmacher [sic], alias marquis de Verdières and located in the Dordogne area.

=== Jocelyn Bodilly ===
In 1936, Gotch married barrister Jocelyn Bodilly (1913-1997), who was thirty years her junior. He was the son of Ralph Burland Bodilly (1894-1961) and Sybil Sacré (1879-1959) who were both cousins of Gotch (see section Family below). Jocelyn's paternal grandfather was Cornish artist, Frank Bodilly, who trained to become a lawyer, and in 1904 was appointed a Judge in the High Court of Calcutta, India. Jocelyn’s father Ralph was also in the legal profession and was appointed chief magistrate of Tel Aviv, Palestine in 1933. (Note: In 1934 Palestine, magistrate Ralph B. Bodilly committed Stavsky, Rosenblatt and Achimeier for trial in the criminal assizes court on charges of the premeditated murder of Haim Arlosoroff. Also see Hebrew Wikipedia article he:ראלף בודילי) Jocelyn, following in their footsteps, eventually becoming Chief Justice in the Western Pacific. Gotch would have known Jocelyn since the day he was born. In 1922 two of his sisters, Ursula and Godefer (aged 10 and 12), were junior bridesmaids at her wedding to Andre, Marquis de Verdières, and Jocelyn at this date would have been nine.

Gotch visited her future father-in-law, Ralph Bodilly, in Tel Aviv in 1933/34 and wrote an illustrated article on her impressions of the area, the people and the politics, published in the Daily Telegraph on 14 February 1934. It was later reproduced in other newspapers. (Note: Ralph Burland Bodilly was Gotch's father-in-law (and her cousin) but was also younger than her by about a year, having been born on 25 November 1884.)

== Newlyn ==
After the First World War, plans were set in place in Britain to improve the housing stock throughout the country. Local authorities were instructed to clear slum dwellings and rebuild with improved standards and sanitation. In Newlyn this resulted in proposals to knock down the family homes of the fishing community around the harbour. The residents of these homes fought to stop them being destroyed and Gotch, who by now was a local councillor, supported them and handled the publicity. To raise the profile of their campaign one of the local fishing vessels named Rosebud was sent from Newlyn, round the south coast of England, and up the Thames to the Houses of Parliament to deliver a petition to the Minister of Health.

During the Second World War, Gotch lost her seat on the council for non attendance. After the war she stood again but was not elected.

Gotch died in Hong Kong on 24 April 1963. She is buried with her parents in Sancreed Churchyard. Her husband, Jocelyn, remarried to physiotherapist Marjorie Fogg (1922-1996) in St John's Cathedral, in Hong Kong on 1 August 1964. Jocelyn and Marjorie were buried in the parish church at Gulval, Cornwall. The obituary for Sir Jocelyn Bodilly, printed in The Guardian 5 June 1997, was written by journalist Daniel Francis Jeroen van der Vat who was both a friend and neighbour.

== Family ==
Gotch's mother, Caroline, was one of three sisters born to Esther Burland (1824-1878) and property owner, Edward Yates (1825-1879). The family was from the Liverpool area, later moving to Sway in Hampshire. Caroline (1856-1945) was the youngest, the middle sister, Esther (1852-1920) married Frank Bodilly. The oldest, Margaret (1851-1932), married widower, Charles Richard Archibald Sacré in 1877, who was the son of Charles Sacré. One of their children was Sybil Sacré, who married her cousin, Ralph Burland Bodilly in 1908.

Thomas Cooper Gotch's mother was Mary Anne Gale (1816-1885) and his father was Thomas Henry Gotch (1805-1891) from Kettering: a family of bankers, shoe makers and brewers. In 1858 they were declared bankrupt due to poor management of the banking business, and it took several years for the family to recover.

On 11 May 1933, Gotch's daughter Deirdre, aged eighteen, was presented at Court as a débutante in Buckingham Palace. Deirdre was presented to the Queen by Lady Slesser, and Gotch was presented by Madame Regis de Oliveira. In the mid 1930s Deirdre, had a relationship with Major Robin Thynne who was living in the village of Paul, Cornwall not far from Newlyn. He was involved with several schemes, one of which was trying to launch the Mandrake Press. He became associated with the English occultist and novelist, Aleister Crowley, whom he hoped to publish. He introduced Deirdre Doherty to him and a friendship developed between them. Deirdre eventually had a child with Crowley named Randall Gair, who died in a car accident in 2002 at the age of 65. A television documentary was filmed of Crowley's life in 2002 including an interview with Deirdre about her relationship and the child they had together. Deirdre went on to marry James MacAlpine, an officer killed on a secret mission during the Second World War. She served as a Base Cypher Officer in Egypt during the war, living there with her three children and her grandmother, Caroline Gotch. She died at Lapford, near Crediton in Devon, in 1992, known as Deirdre Patricia Maureen MacLellan.
