= Herbert Dyer =

Herbert Dyer (1898–1974) was an English coppersmith who worked in Mousehole, near Penzance, during the 1920s, influenced by the Newlyn Industrial Class near Penzance, Cornwall.

He first became interested in the art of copper work with trench art whilst serving with the Royal Horse Artillery in 1916. After service in France, Belgium, and Egypt he returned to Cumbria in 1922 but had to walk south to find work. He eventually set up a workshop in Mousehole and starting by making items to suit local needs.
