= Keswick School of Industrial Art =

Art school in Keswick, England (1884–1984)

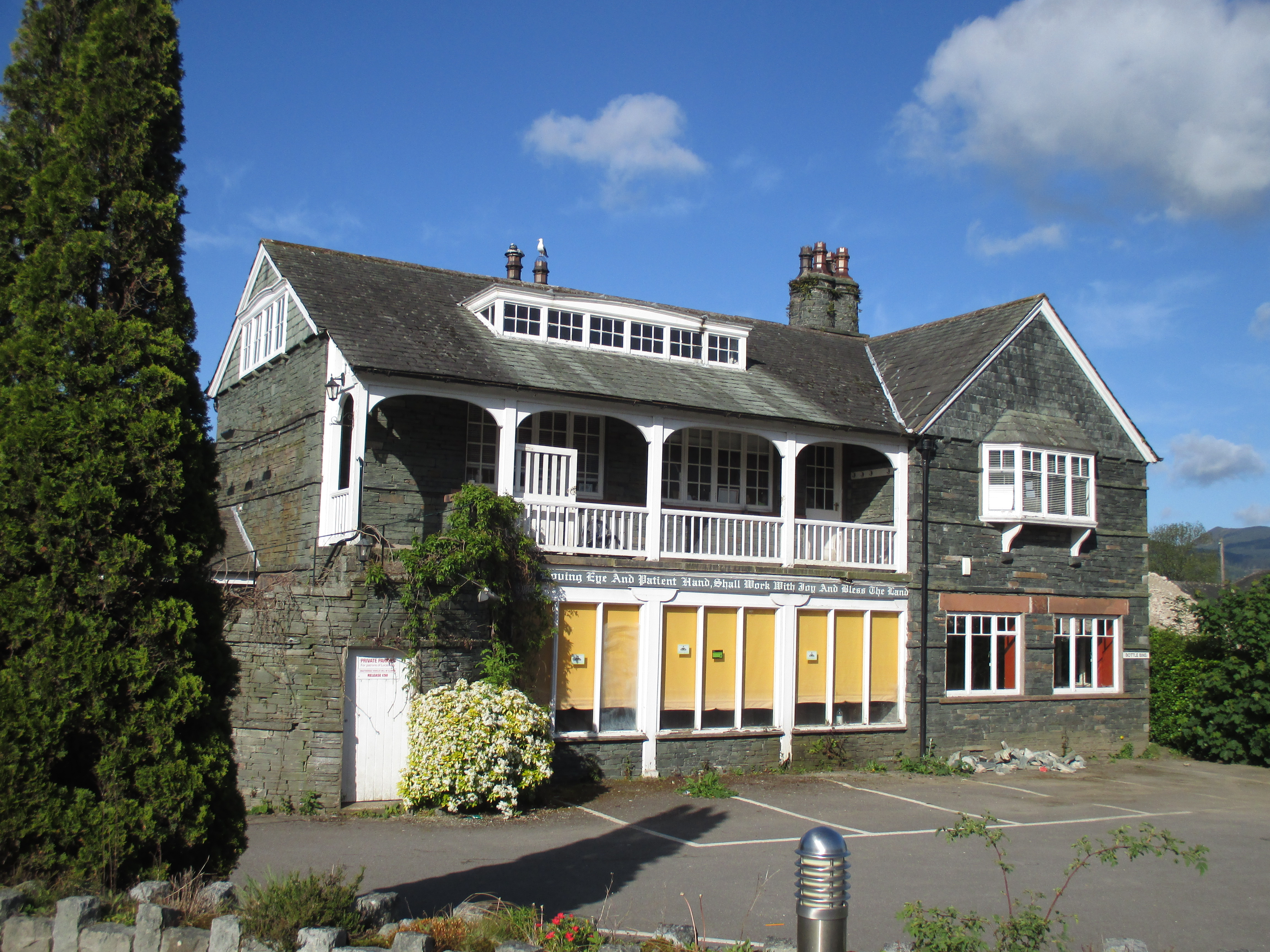
- Former building of the Keswick School of Industrial Art

Location
- 54°36′13″N 3°08′35″W

Information
- Established: 1884
- Founder: Edith and Hardwicke Rawnsley

Keswick School of Industrial Art (KSIA) (sometimes Keswick School of Industrial Arts) was founded in 1884 by Canon Hardwicke Rawnsley and his wife Edith as an evening class in woodwork and repoussé metalwork at the Crosthwaite Parish Rooms, in Keswick, Cumbria. The enterprise, designed to alleviate unemployment, prospered, and within ten years more than a hundred men were attending classes. A new building was erected for the school at a nearby site.

The school closed in 1984 and the building became a restaurant.

== History ==
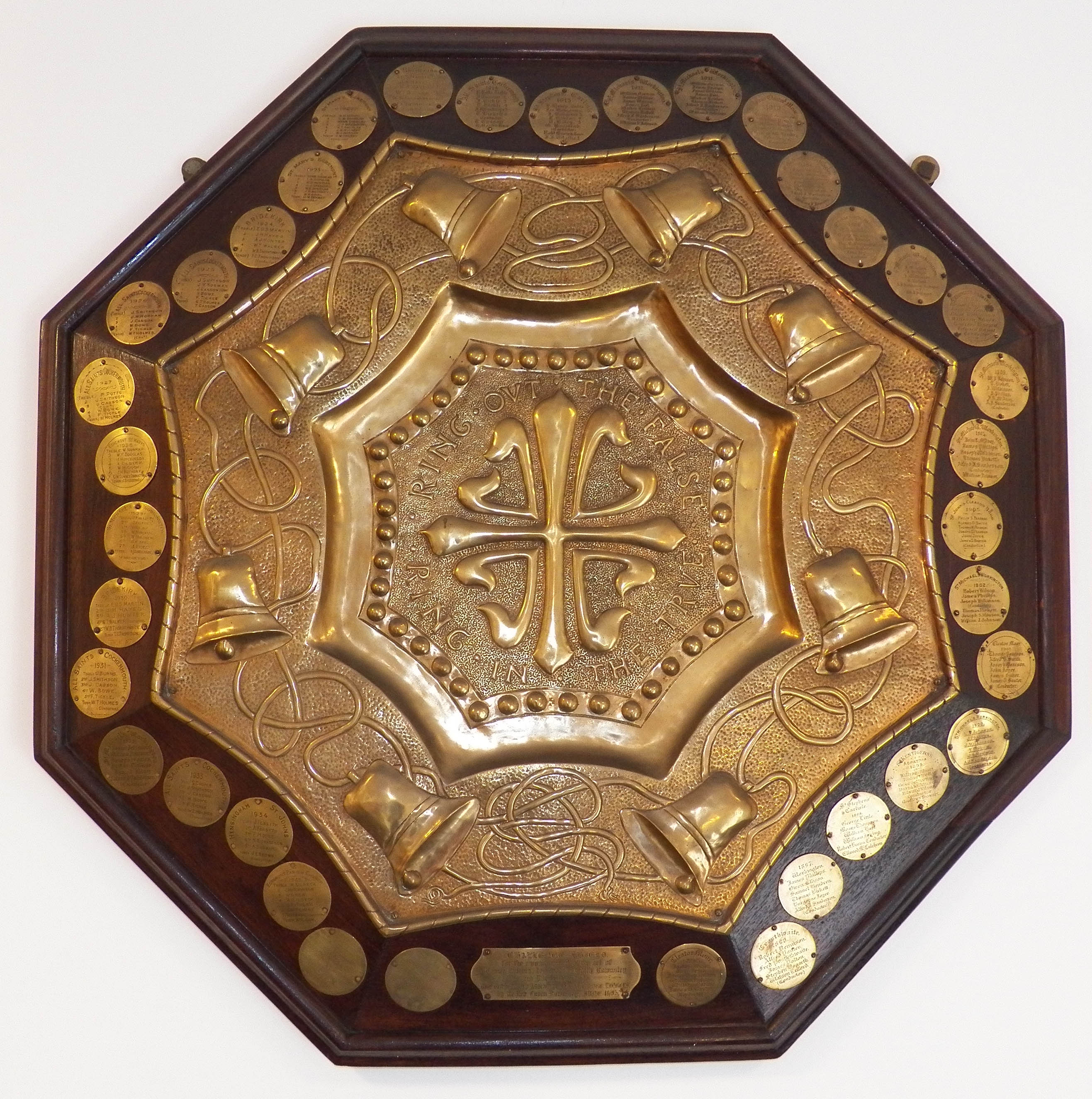
The Rawnsley Shield: designed by Edith Rawnsley, made by Keswick School of Industrial Art, and presented to the Cumberland Association of Bell Ringers in 1895 by Canon H D Rawnsley to be competed for annually in a striking competition.

Rawnsley was the vicar of Crosthwaite, at the edge of Keswick, from 1883 to 1917. He was one of the three co-founders of the National Trust and was a prominent figure in philanthropic enterprises in the area, helping to establish a grammar school, a hospital and a farm school.

Inspired by the precepts of John Ruskin, Rawnsley and his wife set up free evening classes in the parish rooms, beginning in November 1884, to teach metalwork and wood carving under the supervision of a London professional woodcarver and a local jeweller. In the winter months there was considerable unemployment in the town; the Rawnsleys provided training in skills that could alleviate the problem.

The school prospered and swiftly developed a reputation for high quality copper and silver decorative metalwork. By 1888 nearly seventy men were attending the classes. By 1890 the school was exhibiting nationally and winning prizes; Its numbers now more than a hundred, it had outgrown its cramped home in the parish rooms, and Rawnsley raised funds for a purpose-built school nearby. Among his supporters were Walter Crane, Holman Hunt, and G. F. Watts. The new building, to which the school moved in 1894, was designed by the Lancaster architects Paley and Austin at a cost of £1,300. The workrooms were on the ground floor, with the showroom and a library on the upper floor. Beneath the balcony of the façade is the slogan:

The loving eye and patient hand
Shall work with joy and bless the land

The school was mainly financed from sales of its products. Its funds became inadequate in the 1980s, from a combination of inadequate marketing and cheaper imported goods. The school closed in 1984. The Keswick Museum displays a range of the school's works. The building, with its façade intact, became a restaurant.

== Directors ==
Director	Tenure
Herbert Maryon	March 1900–December 1904
Robert Hilton	December 1904–November 1921
G. Atholl Weeks	November 1921–January 1952
Thomas Hartley	(acting) January 1952 – 1953; (permanent) 1953–April 1962
Charles W. Petrie	April 1962–December 1984

== See also ==
- List of non-ecclesiastical works by Austin and Paley (1895–1914)
- Newlyn Copper
