= John Pearson (artist) =

English master craftsman

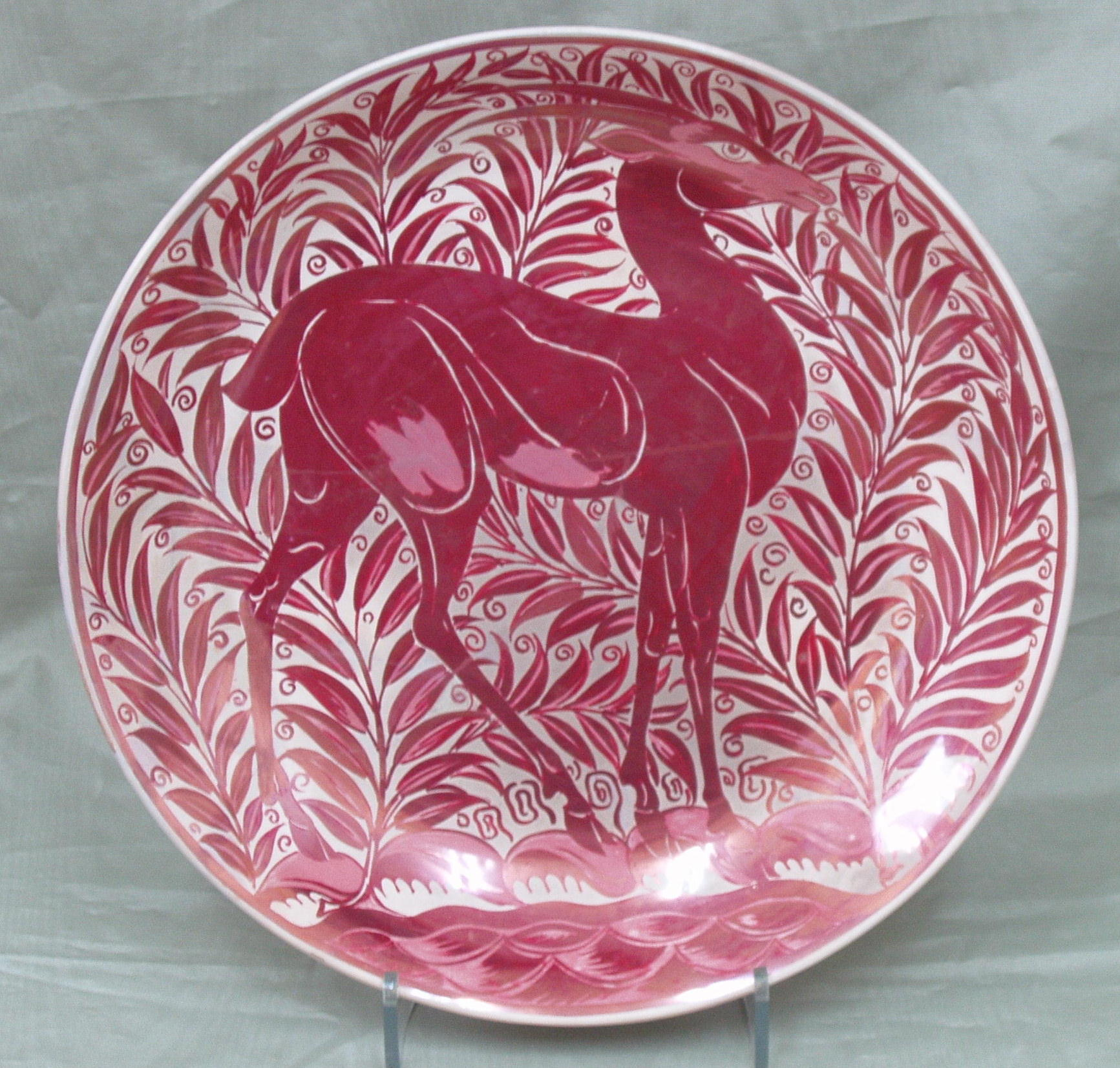
William De Morgan Antelope Charger in red lustre decorated by John Pearson

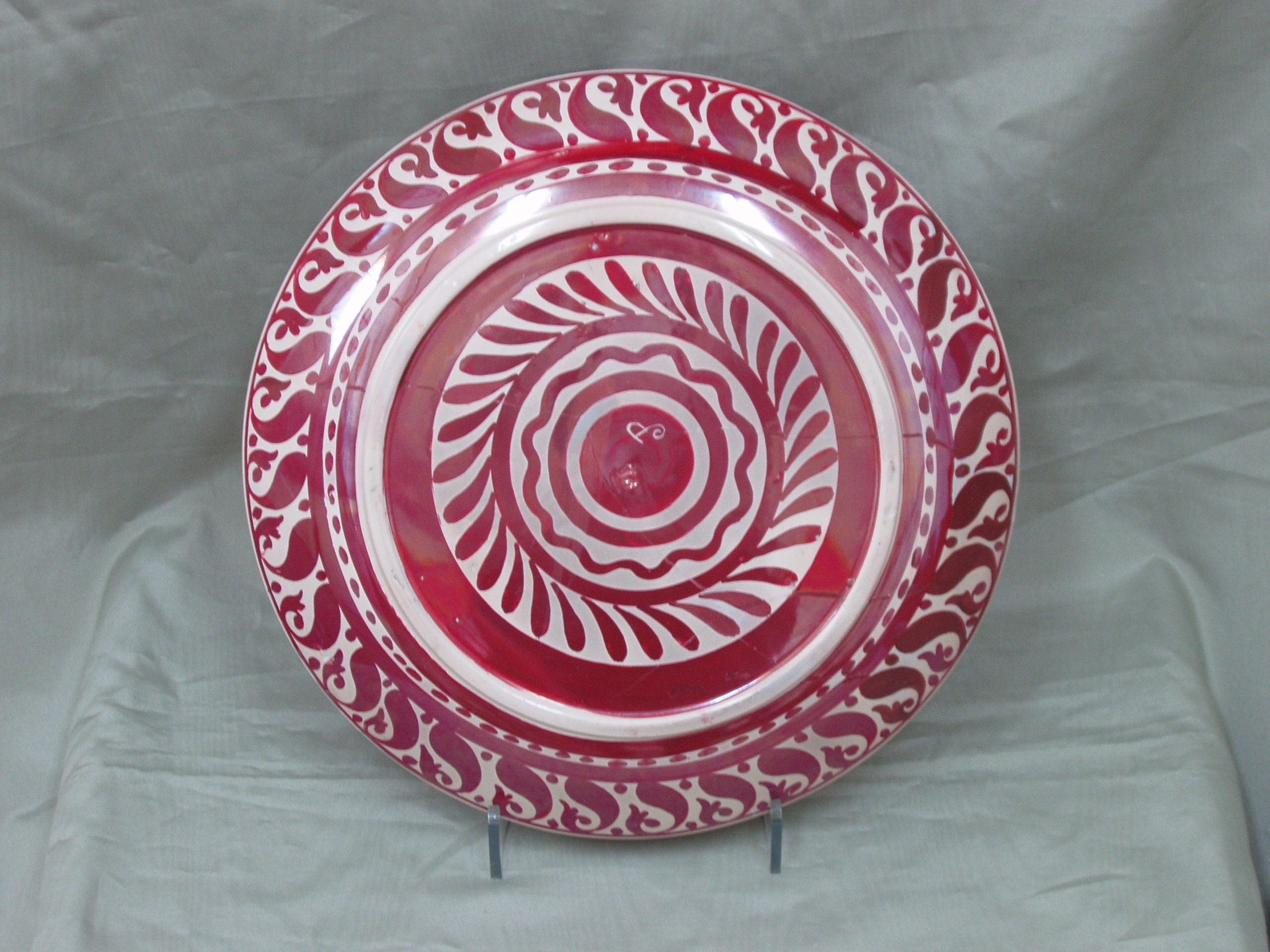
William De Morgan Antelope Charger in red lustre decorated by John Pearson - verso showing JP mark

John Pearson (1859 in Lambeth – 1930 in Canvey Island) (fl. 1885–1910) was a master craftsman of the Newlyn School and Guild of Handicraft. He worked in copper and his style is described as arts and crafts / Modern Style (British Art Nouveau style).

Together with Charles Robert Ashbee, he was a founding member of the Guild of Handicraft at Whitechapel, London in 1888. John Pearson was dismissed from the Guild of Handicraft in 1892 and made his way to Newlyn, Cornwall where he worked in the recently established industrial school.

Pearson was greatly influenced by William De Morgan (1839–1917) and there is some evidence that he worked in some capacity at De Morgan's workshop decorating tiles and pottery and making associated metalwork, for example tile mounts.

Perhaps the most notable examples of Pearson's work are the four large copper plaques, earth, air, fire and water, that decorate the facade of Newlyn Art Gallery. In addition to his time with De Morgan, as the senior metalworker at the Guild of Handicraft and at Newlyn, Pearson worked on his own account as a metalworker and decorating pottery.

== See also ==
- Newlyn Copper
