= Newlyn Copper =

Class of Arts and crafts copperware

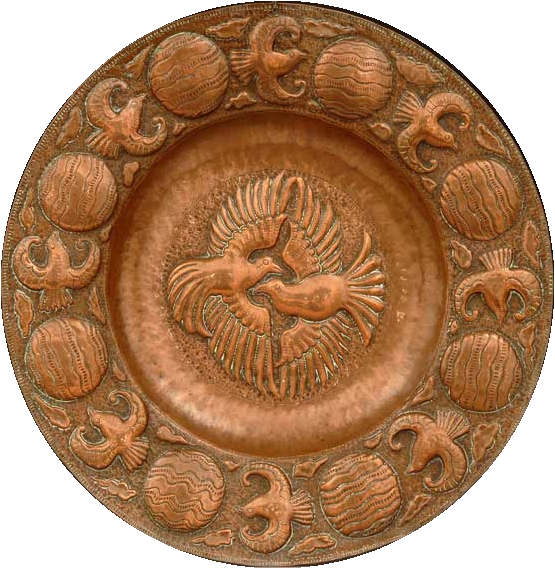

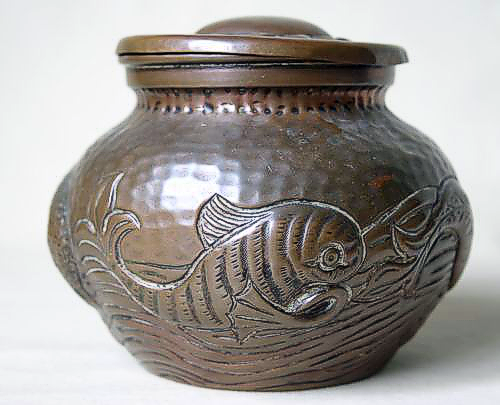

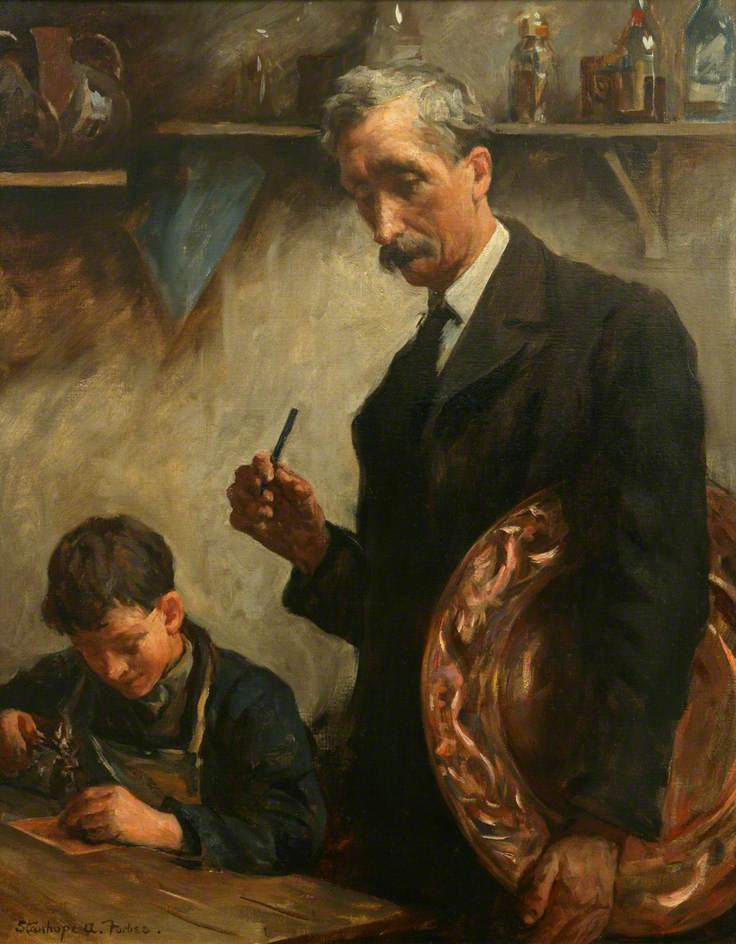
The Young Apprentice, Newlyn Copperworks (1908) by Stanhope Forbes depicts John Drew Mackenzie giving instruction to John Payne Cotton. The painting is on display at Penlee House.

Newlyn Copper was a class of arts and crafts copperware originating in Newlyn in Cornwall.

== History ==
In the late 19th century the fishing industry in Cornwall was becoming unreliable as a source of income; bad weather and seasonal fluctuations brought enforced periods of inactivity. It was decided that an alternative means of employment could be gained by training the unemployed fishermen to produce items in copper.

John Drew Mackenzie, an artist who settled at Newlyn was a key figure in setting up the Newlyn Industrial Class, assisted by the benefactor and local Member of Parliament, Thomas Bedford Bolitho, and artists Reginald Dick, T. C. Gotch, Perry Craft and John Pearson. After some early experiments, the class specialised in repoussé copper work and produced a wide range of domestic and decorative items. The school remained active for about thirty years after its establishment in 1890.

Other known artists who produced work in the Newlyn style included: Herbert Dyer, Obed Nicholls, Phillip Hodder, William Pezzack, Tom Batten, John Payne Cotton, John Curnow, John Edgar Laity, George Mildren, Joe Pengelly, William P. Wright and William Tonkin.

The range of objects produced by the class including trays, mirror and photograph frames, chambersticks, plates and chargers, boxes, bowls and coffee pots: designs typically featured fish, ships and other nautical themes.

A permanent collection, representing much of the work of the original Newlyn School, is on view at the Penlee House Gallery and Museum in Penzance. Newlyn Copper is now highly valued by collectors.

The Copper Works Newlyn was re-established by Michael Johnson in 2004.

== See also ==
- Keswick School of Industrial Art
