= John Drew MacKenzie =

British master craftsman

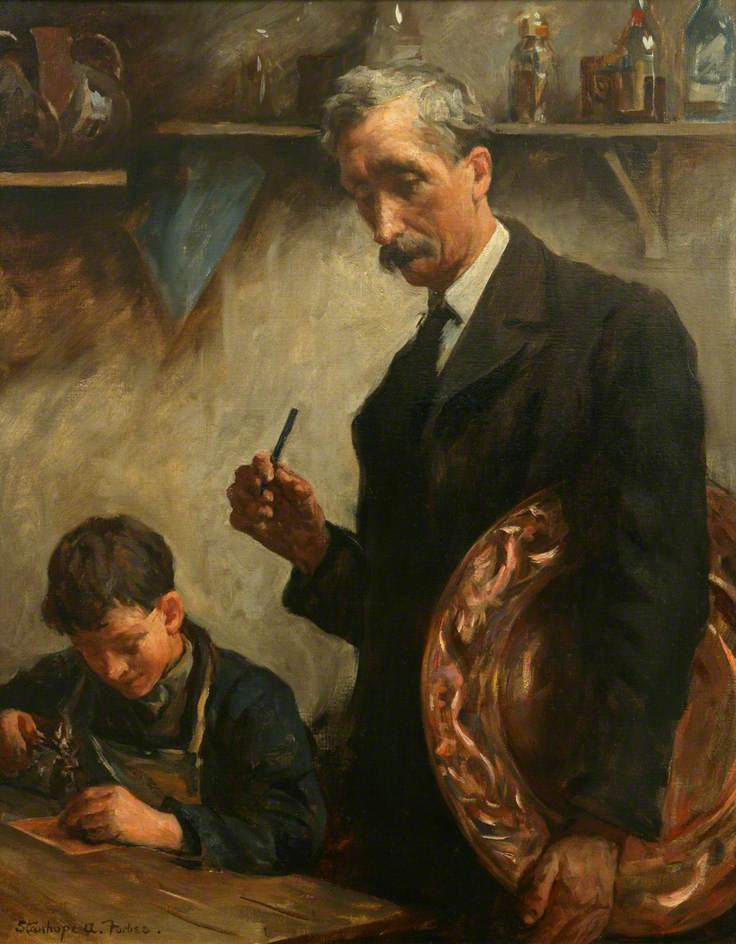
The Young Apprentice, Newlyn Copperworks by Stanhope Forbes depicts MacKenzie

John Drew MacKenzie (10 April 1861 – 22 July 1918) was a British master craftsman and instructor of the Newlyn Copper school in Cornwall, England. His style is described as arts and crafts/Art Nouveau.

Mackenzie was born in Shanghai, China, and educated at Clifton College. He is credited with being the instigator of the Newlyn Copper industry.

He arrived in Cornwall in 1888 as a painter and illustrator and in 1890 founded the Newlyn Industrial Class, instructing local people in metalwork, enamelling and embroidery. MacKenzie died in 1918 but Tom Batten and Johnny Payne Cotton restarted production at the Newlyn school in 1920.

In 1908, his portrait was painted by Newlyn artist Stanhope Forbes. Entitled The Young Apprentice, Newlyn Copperworks it depicts MacKenzie giving instruction to a young Johnny Payne Cotton. This painting is now on display at Penlee House Gallery in Penzance, Cornwall.

Mackenzie died in the Norfolk War Hospital in Norwich on 22 July 1918, suffering from influenza and pneumonia.
